= Malaysia Federal Route 220 =

Road in the Malaysian state of Penang

Federal Route 220
- Jalan Paya Terubong; Jalan Dato Ismail Hashim

Route information
- Maintained by Malaysian Public Works Department
- Length: 16.60 km (10.31 mi)

Major junctions
- North end: Air Itam
- Jalan Air Itam; FT 221 Jalan Thean Teik; Jalan Tun Sardon; Jalan Tun Dr Awang; FT 6 Gelugor Highway
- South end: Bayan Lepas

Location
- Country: Malaysia
- Primary destinations: Paya Terubong; Relau; Bayan Baru; Sungai Ara

Highway system
- Highways in Malaysia; Expressways; Federal; State

Federal Route 220, consisting of Jalan Paya Terubong and Jalan Dato Ismail Hashim (formerly Penang State Route P11 and P6), is a federal road in Penang, Malaysia.

== Features ==
At most sections, the Federal Route 220 was built under the JKR R5 road standard, allowing maximum speed limit of up to 90 km/h.

== Junctions ==
Km	Exit	Junctions	To	Remarks
			East; Jalan Air Itam; George Town City Centre	
		Jalan Padang Tembak	Northwest; P221 Jalan Padang Tembak (Rifle Range Road); Jalan Sempadan (Boundary Road)	T-junctions
		Lorong Batu Lanchang	South; Lorong Batu Lanchang; Taman Kennedy	T-junctions
		Jalan Thean Teik	South; FT 221 Jalan Thean Teik; Farlim; Bandar Baru Air Itam	T-junctions
		Taman Rifle		
		Jalan Sempadan	North; P221 Jalan Padang Tembak (Boundary Road); Jalan Padang Tembak (Rifle Range Road)	T-junctions
		Sungai Air Itam bridge		
		Air Itam; Penang Hill roundabout	Northwest; P210 Jalan Bukit Bendera (Penang Hill Road); Bukit Bendera Funicular Railway Station; Bukit Bendera	Roundabout
		Paya Terubong	Northwest; Jalan Balik Pulau; Balik Pulau; Kek Lok Si Temple	T-junctions
		Kampung Lembah Ria		
		Jalan Thean Teik	Northeast; FT 221 Jalan Thean Teik; Farlim; Bandar Baru Air Itam	T-junctions
		Paya Terubong flats		
		Bukit Jambul	South Jalan Bukit Kukus Paired Road	
		Jalan Tun Sardon	West; Jalan Tun Sardon; Balik Pulau	T-junctions
		Kampung Darat		
		Kampung Batak		
		Relau	Jalan Tun Dr Awang East; Sungai Nibong; Gelugor South; Bayan Lepas; Penang International Airport	T-junctions
		Kampung Manggis		
		Kampung Pagar Buloh		
		Sungai Ara	East; P8 Jalan Tengah; Bayan Baru	T-junctions
		Taman Seri Acres		
		Taman Desa Ria		
		Pearl Garden		
		Kampung Sepuluh		
		Pearl Garden Golf and Country Club		
		Kampung Perlis		
		Jalan Mahkamah	Southeast; Jalan Mahkamah	T-junctions
		Bayan Lepas	FT 6 Gelugor Highway West; Paya Terubong; Penara; Balik Pulau East; Sungai Nibong; Gelugor; Penang International Airport	T-junctions
