= Ayer Itam–Tun Dr Lim Chong Eu Expressway Bypass =

Road in the Malaysian state of Penang

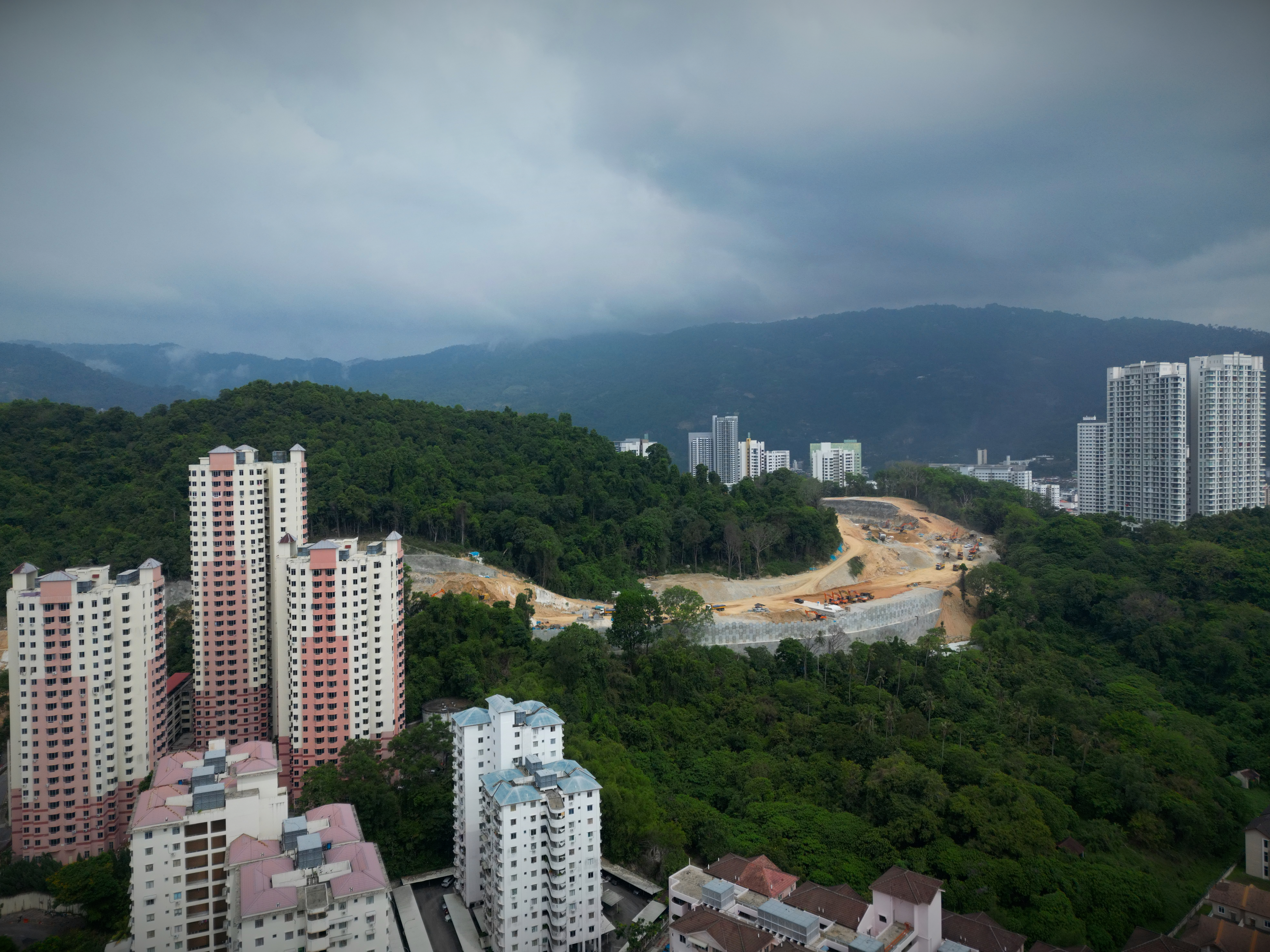
- Section 2 hill clearing, flanked by Green Lane and Farlim neighbourhoods, as of 2024

Route information
- Length: 6 km (3.7 mi)

Major junctions
- West end: Farlim, Paya Terubong
- FT 221 Lebuhraya Thean Teik; Jalan Yeap Chor Ee; Jalan Bukit Gambir; FT 6 Gelugor Highway
- East end: Tun Dr Lim Chong Eu Expressway

Location
- Country: Malaysia
- Primary destinations: Paya Terubong; Gelugor; Tun Dr Lim Chong Eu Expressway

Highway system
- Highways in Malaysia; Expressways; Federal; State

The Ayer Itam–Tun Dr Lim Chong Eu Expressway Bypass is a dual carriageway under construction in the city of George Town within the Malaysian state of Penang. The 6 km (3.7 mi) road will connect the inland neighbourhood of Farlim to the coastal Tun Dr Lim Chong Eu Expressway. Slated for completion by 2026, the bypass is part of the Penang Transport Master Plan, which aims to alleviate traffic congestion in the state through the construction of three new roadways.

== History ==
Introduced by the Penang state government in 2014, the Penang Transport Master Plan (PTMP) envisaged three new motorways intended to disperse traffic from the existing roads throughout George Town, in addition to a cross-strait tunnel which would connect the city with Seberang Perai. The three proposed roads are:

- Package 1: North Coast Paired Road
- Package 2: Ayer Itam–Tun Dr Lim Chong Eu Expressway Bypass
- Package 3: George Town Inner Ring Road

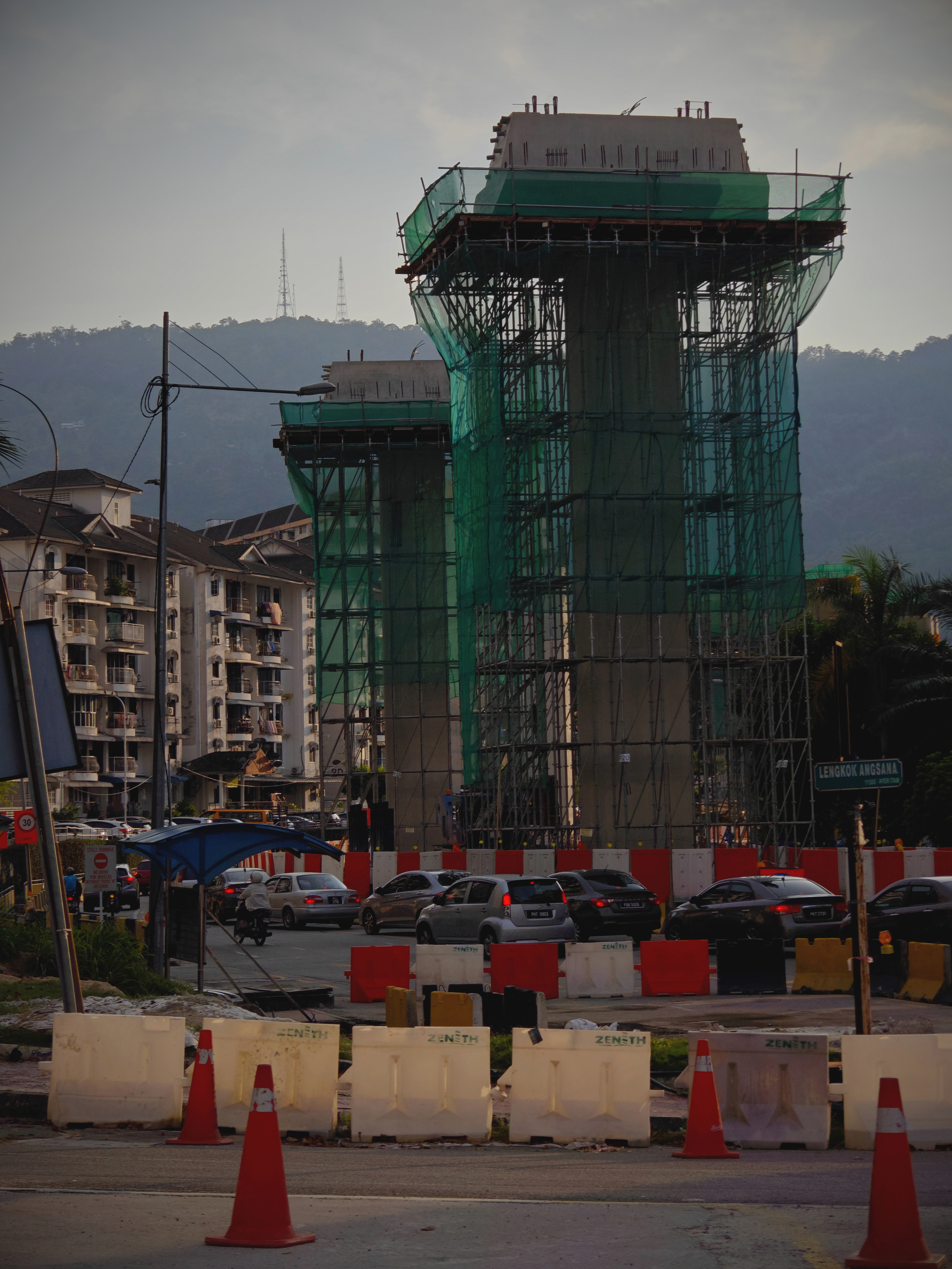
Construction of viaduct structures at Farlim in 2024

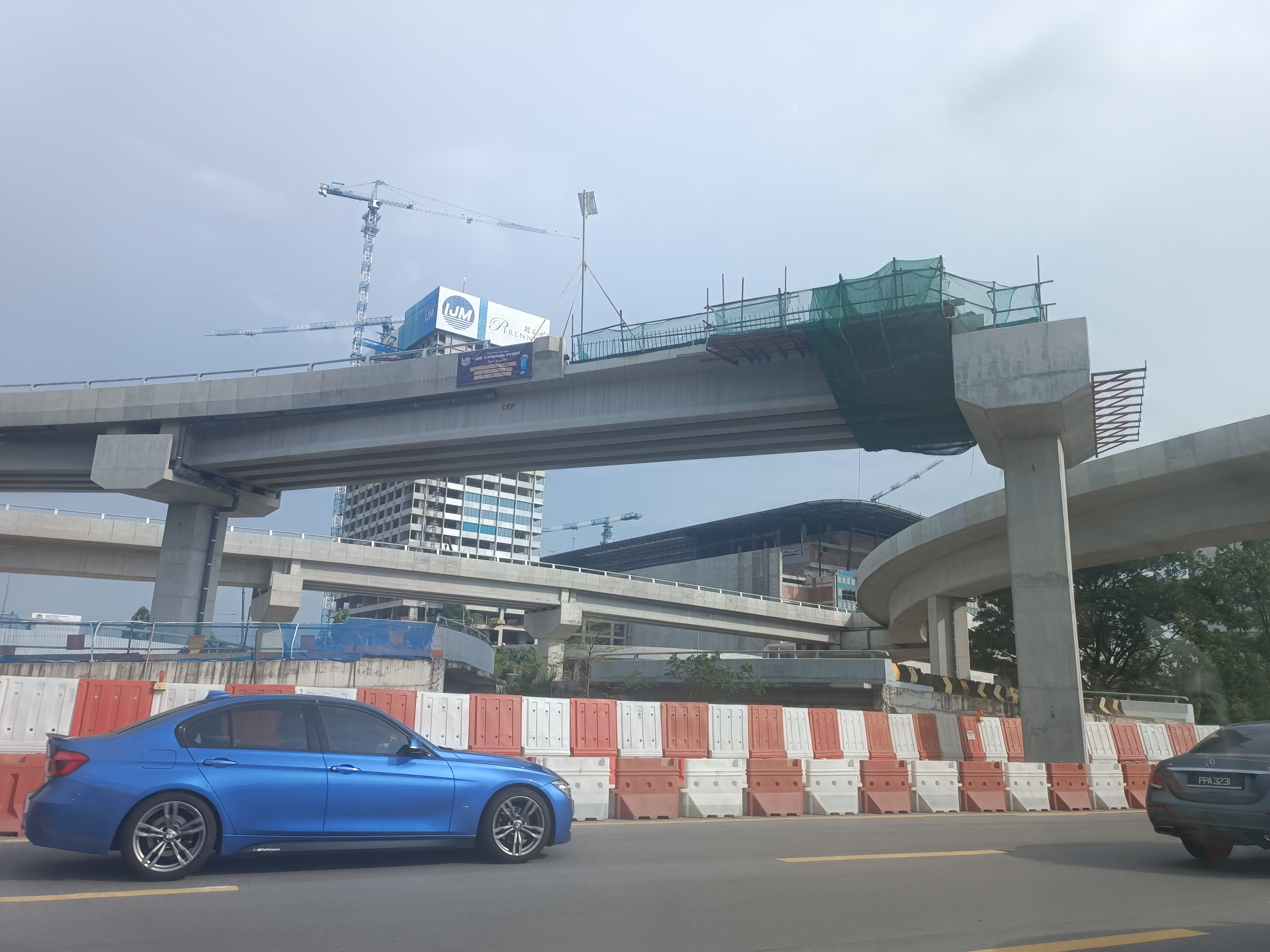
Viaduct structures under construction near The Light Waterfront in 2024

Consortium Zenith Construction (CZC) had been appointed the developer of the three roads in 2013 through an open tender process. Formed in 2012, CZC comprised Beijing Urban Construction Group (BUCG) – which had previously built venues for the 2008 Olympics in Beijing – and local firm Zenith Construction. In exchange for the three roads and the tunnel, CZC was granted exclusive development rights for 44.5 ha (110 acres) of land at Gurney Bay, negating the need for the imposition of toll charges to finance the construction.

At the time, the Ayer Itam–Tun Dr Lim Chong Eu Expressway Bypass was projected to halve the commute time between Farlim and the Tun Dr Lim Chong Eu Expressway by up to 50%, with a speed limit of 70 km/h (43 mph). Of the three planned roadways, the bypass was given the highest priority due to the traffic congestion at Farlim and the surrounding residential areas. As the route traverses the hilly terrain between Farlim and Green Lane, three twin tunnels – measuring a total of nearly 2 km (1.2 mi) – would be bored into the hills to minimise environmental impacts. The elevated sections have a total length of approximately 4.2 km (2.6 mi), while the at-grade sections add up to 1.8 km (1.1 mi). The bypass is estimated to cost RM851 million.

The three roadways received approval from federal government environmental regulators in 2017. In 2019, the state government signed an agreement with CZC to implement Package 2, followed by a groundbreaking ceremony in November that year. Despite this, construction only began in 2021 and is expected to be completed by 2026. Construction of the bypass reached 73% as of February 2025.

== See also ==
- Jalan Bukit Kukus Paired Road
