= Malaysia Federal Route 221 =

Road in the Malaysian state of Penang

Federal Route 221
- Jalan Thean Teik; Lebuhraya Thean Teik

Route information
- Length: 3.30 km (2.05 mi)

Major junctions
- North end: Air Itam
- FT 220 Federal Route 220
- South end: Paya Terubong

Location
- Country: Malaysia
- Primary destinations: Farlim; Thean Teik; Bandar Baru Air Itam; Desa Baiduri

Highway system
- Highways in Malaysia; Expressways; Federal; State

Federal Route 221, consisting of Jalan Thean Teik (Thean Teik Road) and Lebuhraya Thean Teik (Thean Teik Avenue) (formerly Penang State Route P212), is a federal road in Penang, Malaysia.

== Features ==
At most sections, the Federal Route 221 was built under the JKR R5 road standard, allowing maximum speed limit of up to 90 km/h.

== List of junctions ==
Km	Exit	Junctions	To	Remarks
		Air Itam	FT 220 Jalan Air Itam (Air Itam Road) West; Air Itam; Bukit Bendera; Kek Lok Si Temple South; George Town City Centre	T-junctions
		Jalan Shaik Eussof	East; Jalan Shaik Eussof	T-junctions
		Sungai Air Itam bridge		
		Jalan Shaik Madar	East; Jalan Shaik Madar	T-junctions
		SJK(C) Sin Kang		
		Kampung Melayu Air Itam		
		Fortune Court		
		Farlim	West; Jalan Pisang Embun; Farlim; Kampung Pisang	T-junctions
		Sungai Dondang bridge		
		Thean Teik; Thean Teik Junctions	East; Lebuhraya Thean Teik (Thean Teik Avenue); Green Lane; Jelutong South; Jalan Angsana; Bandar Baru Air Itam	Junctions
		Bandar Baru Air Itam; Lintang Angsana	South; P225 Lintang Angsana; Bandar Baru Air Itam	T-junctions
		Desa Baiduri; Jalan Zoo	North; Jalan Zoo (Zoo Road); Desa Baiduri	T-junctions
		Jalan Bukit Kukus	South; Jalan Bukit Kukus; Bukit Kukus	T-junctions
		Paya Terubong	FT 220 Jalan Paya Terubong North; Air Itam; Bukit Bendera; Kek Lok Si Temple South; Relau; Balik Pulau; Bayan Lepas; Penang International Airport	T-junctions
