= Jalan Bukit Kukus Paired Road =

Road in the Malaysian state of Penang

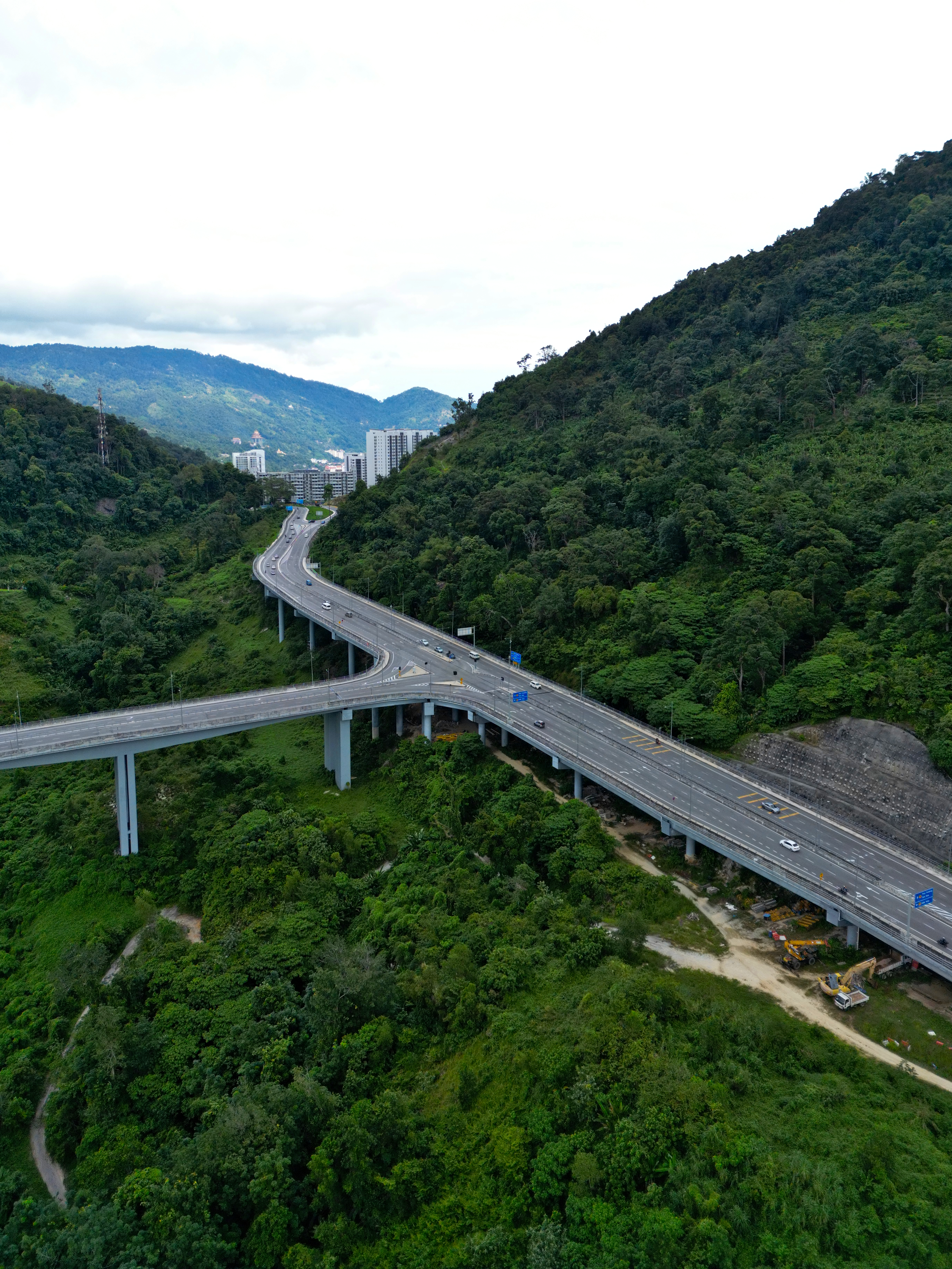

Route information
- Maintained by Penang Island City Council
- Length: 5.5 km (3.4 mi)

Major junctions
- North end: Paya Terubong
- FT 220 Federal Route 220; Jalan Tun Sardon; Bukit Jambul Highway
- South end: Bukit Jambul, Paya Terubong

Location
- Country: Malaysia
- Primary destinations: Paya Terubong, Balik Pulau

Highway system
- Highways in Malaysia; Expressways; Federal; State

The Jalan Bukit Kukus Paired Road is a dual carriageway in the city of George Town within the Malaysian state of Penang. The municipally-funded 5.5 km (3.4 mi) road stretches across the valleys at the centre of Penang Island, connecting Paya Terubong and Balik Pulau. Scheduled for completion by 2028, a 3.3 km (2.1 mi) stretch was opened for use in 2022. It is touted as the tallest elevated expressway in Malaysia, reaching the highest point of 59.4 m (195 ft) from the pile caps, or 61.5 m (202 ft) above ground.

== History ==
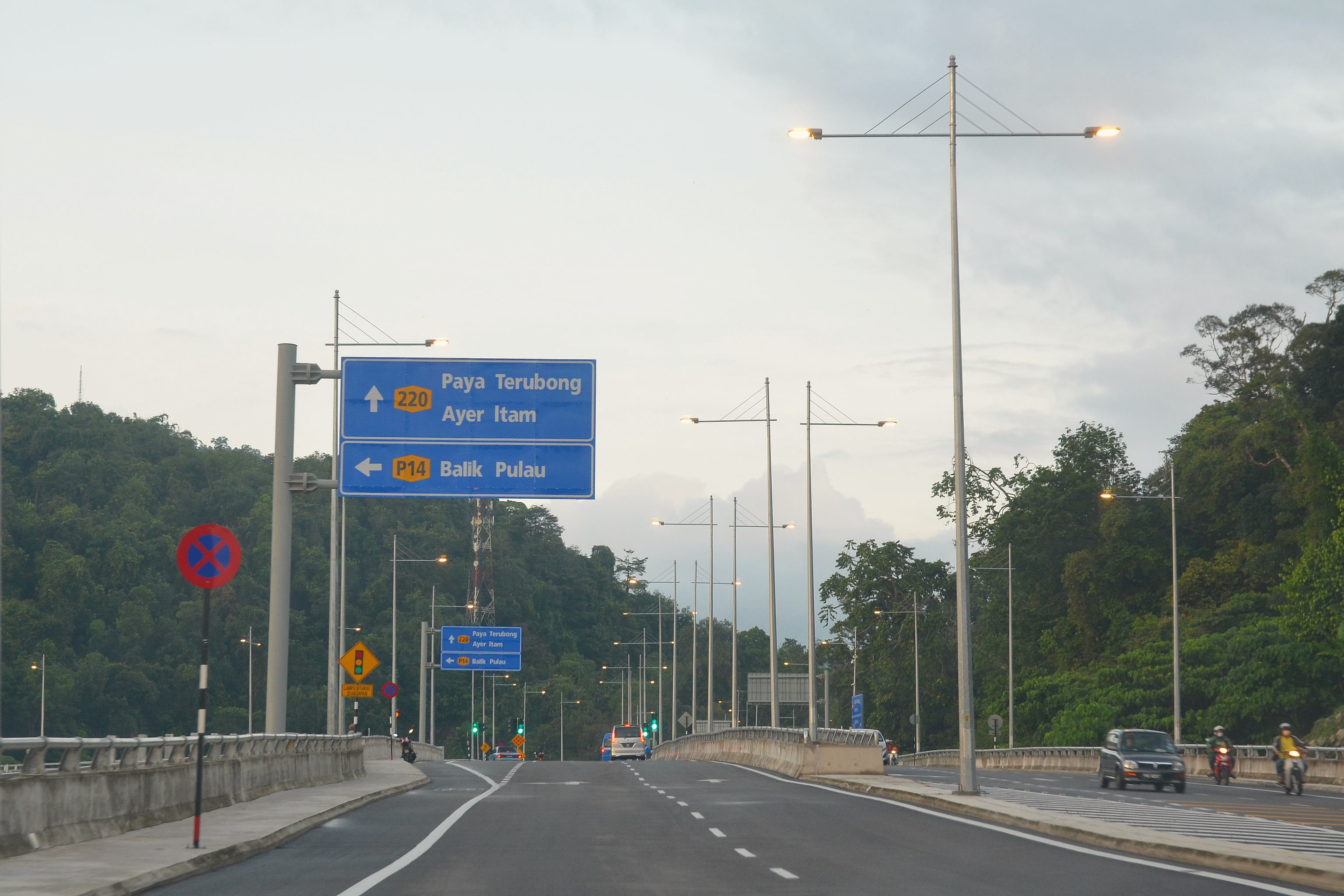
View of the top of the elevated part approaching the T-junction from the south in April 2022

The Jalan Bukit Kukus Paired Road was proposed as an alternative to the narrower Jalan Paya Terubong that runs through the hills at the centre of Penang Island. Its construction started in 2016, with the Penang Island City Council (MBPP) building a 3.3 km (2.1 mi) stretch. The remaining length was allocated to two private contractors, Geo Valley Sdn Bhd and PLB Land Sdn Bhd. As there was a lack of financial support from the federal government, the RM545.6 million expressway was built entirely with state funds. Out of this amount, the portion constructed by the MBPP costed RM378.2 million. The then Mayor Yew Tung Seang later remarked that up to that point, it was the biggest construction project ever undertaken by the local government.

In 2018, construction was halted temporarily due to a landslide that killed nine workers. Geo Valley Sdn Bhd was subsequently taken to court, which slowed down the progress of the construction. The project also met further delays as a result of the COVID-19 pandemic. Consequently, the 3.3 km (2.1 mi) section built by the MBPP had to be opened first in 2022, with the remaining portions to be completed by 2028. At the time of its opening, the road boasts the tallest viaducts in Malaysia, reaching as high as 61.5 m (202 ft) above ground at some sections and surpassing the Rawang Bypass in Selangor. It was expected that the carriageway would reduce congestion in the immediate vicinity by 30%.

== Junctions lists ==
The entire route is located in Northeast District, Penang.

Legend:

- I/C - Interchange, I/S - Intersection, RSA - Rest and service area, OBR - Overhead bridge restaurant, R/R - Restaurant and rest plaza, L/B - Layby, V/P - Vista point, TN - tunnel, T/P - Toll plaza, BR - Bridge
- C - Cloverleaf, S - Stack, T-A - Trumpet-A, T-B - Trumpet-B, DT - Directional-T/Y, SDT - Semi-Directional-T/Y, P-Y - Partial-Y, D - Diamond, P-C - Partial cloverleaf, D-D - Diverging diamond, D-R - Direct ramp

Location	km	mi	Name	Destinations	Notes
Paya Terubong			Paya Terubong	FT 220 Malaysia Federal Route 220 – Paya Terubong	
Paya Terubong			Jalan Tun Sardon	Jalan Tun Sardon – Balik Pulau	T-junction
Bukit Jambul			Bukit Jambul	Bukit Jambul Highway – Bukit Jambul	
1.000 mi = 1.609 km; 1.000 km = 0.621 mi

== See also ==
- Ayer Itam–Tun Dr Lim Chong Eu Expressway Bypass
