= Frederick Victor Duckworth =

British colonial administrator (1901–1974)

Frederick Victor Duckworth CMG
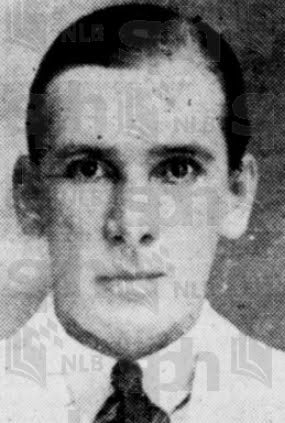
- Duckworth in 1935

British Adviser of Selangor
- In office 1954–1956
- Preceded by: Harold George Hammett
- Succeeded by: Post abolished

Personal details
- Born: 11 August 1901
- Died: 18 May 1974 (aged 72)
- Children: 1 son and 1 daughter
- Education: Selwyn College, Cambridge

Frederick Victor Duckworth CMG (11 August 1901 – 18 May 1974) was a British colonial administrator who served as the last British Adviser of Selangor from 1954 to 1956.

== Early life and education ==
Duckworth was born on 11 August 1901, the son of Arthur Duckworth and May Anderson. He was educated at North Point and Selwyn College, Cambridge.

== Career ==
Duckworth joined the Malay Civil Service as a cadet in 1925, and went to Singapore where he served as a magistrate. He then served in a variety of posts including District Officer of Balik Pulau in 1927; Deputy Controller of Labour, Penang in 1928; Assistant Controller of Labour at Klang in 1928; Controller of Labour to Johore in 1933; magistrate in Singapore again from 1937 to 1938, and Deputy Controller of Labour to the Federated Malay States from 1938 to 1940.

After serving as Malayan agent in South Africa from 1942 to 1943, he returned to Malaya in 1945 where he was employed in the Labour Department of the British Military Administration. In 1950, he was appointed Commissioner for Labour of the Federation of Malaya, and an official Member of Federal Legislative Council for a three year term. In 1953, he served as Member for Industrial and Social Relations, and from 1954 to 1956, served as the last British Adviser of Selangor. Having reached the official retirement age, he left the civil service in 1956.

== Personal life and death ==
Duckworth married Eileen Mary whom he divorced in 1933 on the grounds of adultery. In 1939, he married Margaret Wade and they had a daughter and a son.

Duckworth died on 18 May 1974, aged 72.

== Honours ==
Duckworth was appointed Companion of the Order of St Michael and St George (CMG) in the 1954 Birthday Honours.
