= Relau =

- Suburb of George Town
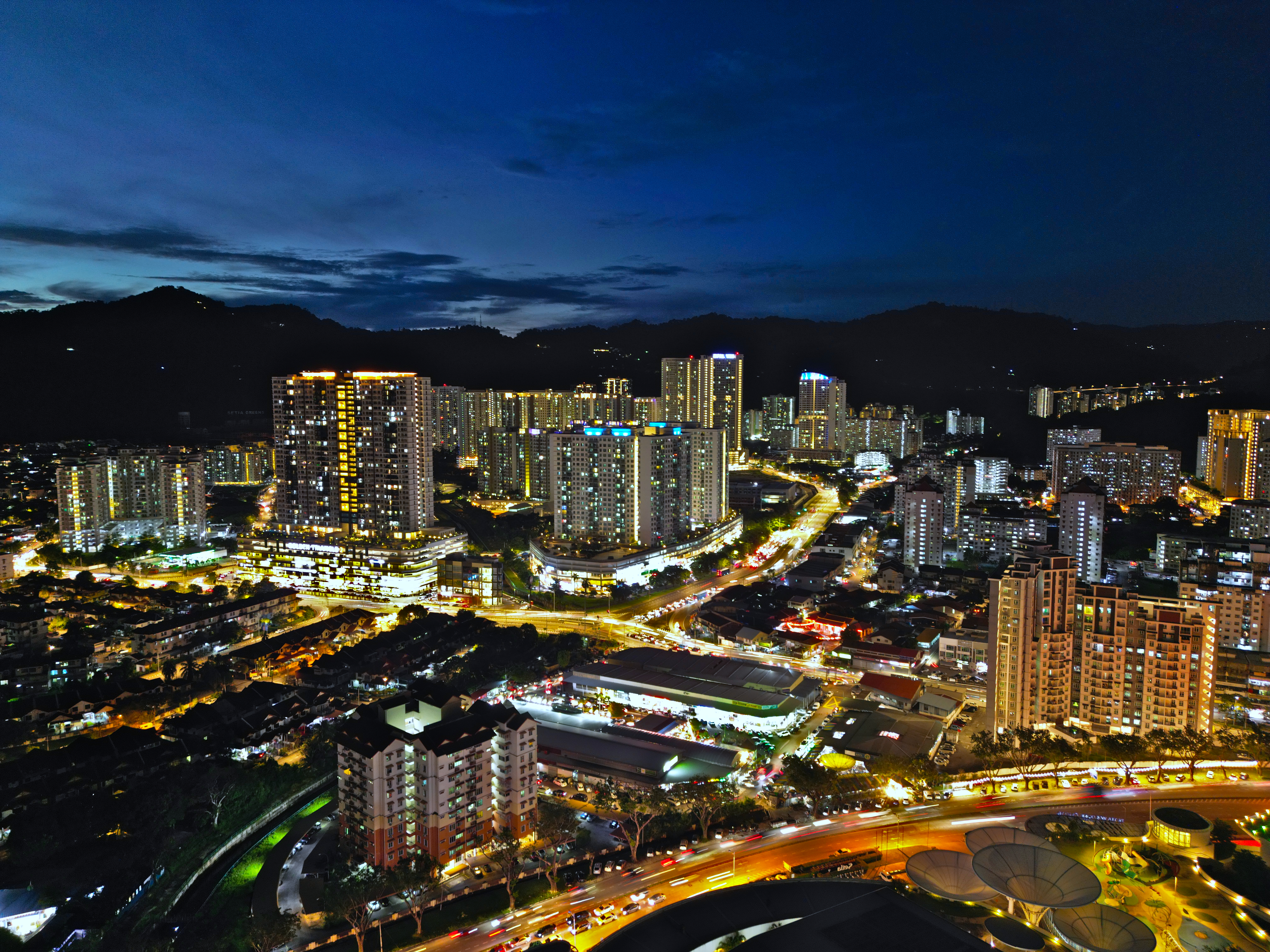

- Location within George Town in Penang
- Coordinates: 5°20′0.888″N 100°16′17.814″E
- Country: Malaysia
- State: Penang
- City: George Town
- District: Northeast

Area
  - Total: 11.5 km^{2} (4.4 sq mi)

Population (2020)
  - Total: 18,755
  - Density: 1,630/km^{2} (4,220/sq mi)

Demographics
  - Ethnic groups: 56.6% Chinese; 35.2% Bumiputera; 34.6% Malay; 0.7% indigenous groups from Sabah and Sarawak; 5.7% Indian; 0.5% Other ethnicities; 1.9% Non-citizens
- Time zone: UTC+8 (MST)
  - Summer (DST): Not observed
- Postal code: 11900

Relau is a suburb of George Town in the Malaysian state of Penang. It is located 9.9 km (6.2 mi) southwest of the city centre, between Paya Terubong to the north, Bayan Lepas to the east and Balik Pulau to the west.

== Etymology ==
Relau is believed to be named after charcoal kilns (Malay: relau) that had been built within the area.

== History ==
One of the major landmarks in Relau is the abandoned Chung Thye Phin Villa, which was formerly the summer residence of Chung Thye Phin, a local tycoon. Chung, the fourth son of Chung Keng Quee, served as the last Chinese Kapitan of Perak. and by the time of his death in 1935 was said to be the wealthiest man on Penang Island.

For much of its history, Relau was an agricultural area, until its eventual development into a housing estate in the 1980s.

== Geography ==
Map of Relau.
Click link at the top right corner to zoom in.
1 Golden Triangle
2 Imperial Grande

== Demographics ==
Ethnicities within Relau in 2020
Ethnicities / Nationality	Percentage
Chinese	56.6%
Malays	34.6%
Other Bumiputeras	0.7%
Indians	5.7%
Others	0.5%
Non-Malaysians	1.9%

As of 2020, the subdivision of Bukit Relau was home to a population of 18,755. Ethnic Chinese constituted nearly 57% of the area's population, while Malays formed another 34%. Indians comprised close to 6% of the suburb's population.

== Transportation ==
Paya Terubong Road, which links Relau with the Paya Terubong suburb to the north and the town of Balik Pulau to the west, serves as the main thoroughfare within the neighbourhood.

Rapid Penang bus routes 301 and 306 include stops within Relau, thus connecting the neighbourhood with the city centre, Queensbay Mall, and the Air Itam and Paya Terubong suburbs.

== Education ==
There are two primary schools within Relau.

- SJK (C) Aik Hua
- SK Seri Relau

== Sports ==
The Relau City Sports Complex, launched in 2017, is the first GBI-certified sports complex in Penang. The 8,785 m^{2} (94,560 ft^{2}) sports complex is equipped with swimming and diving pools, badminton courts, a gymnasium and a dry gym, as well as bicycle parking bays.

Opened in 2003, the Relau Metropolitan Park is the second largest recreational park within Penang Island. Managed by the Penang Island City Council, the park was launched to cater to residents within the southern part of the island, as there had been a lack of recreational amenities within the area in the past.
