= Penang State Route P14 =

Road in the Malaysian state of Penang

Penang Route 14
- Jalan Tun Sardon

Major junctions
- West end: Balik Pulau
- FT 6 Federal Route 6 FT 220 Jalan Paya Terubong
- East end: Paya Terubong

Location
- Country: Malaysia
- Primary destinations: Ayer Itam

Highway system
- Highways in Malaysia; Expressways; Federal; State

Jalan Tun Sardon (Penang State Road P14) is a major road in Penang, Malaysia. The road stretches from Balik Pulau in the west to Paya Terubong in the east. It was first proposed in 1968 under the First Malaysia Plan by the then Penang Chief Minister Wong Pow Nee, with an estimated cost of M$2 million (Malaysian dollar). The route was subsequently named in honour of Sardon Jubir, who served as the Governor of Penang between 1975 and 1981.

== Route background ==
The Kilometre Zero (KM0) of the road starts at Paya Terubong junctions.

- Anjung Indah, a sunset hotspot.

At most sections, Jalan Tun Sardon was built under the JKR R5 road standard, allowing maximum speed limit of up to 80 km/h.

== List of junctions ==
Km	Exit	Junctions	To	Remarks
		Balik Pulau	Northwest; FT 6 Teluk Bahang; FT 6 Batu Feringghi South; FT 6 Teluk Kumbar; FT 6 Bayan Lepas	Roundabout
		Balik Pulau	Northeast; Jalan Balik Pulau; Air Hitam; George Town; Kek Lok Si Temple	T-junctions
		Kampung Permatang Timbun		
		Anjung Indah	V	
		Relau Metropolitan Park		
0		Paya Terubong	FT 220 Jalan Paya Terubong North; Air Itam; George Town; Kek Lok Si Temple South; Relau; Bayan Lepas; Penang International Airport	T-junctions
