= Gertak Sanggul =

- Suburb of George Town
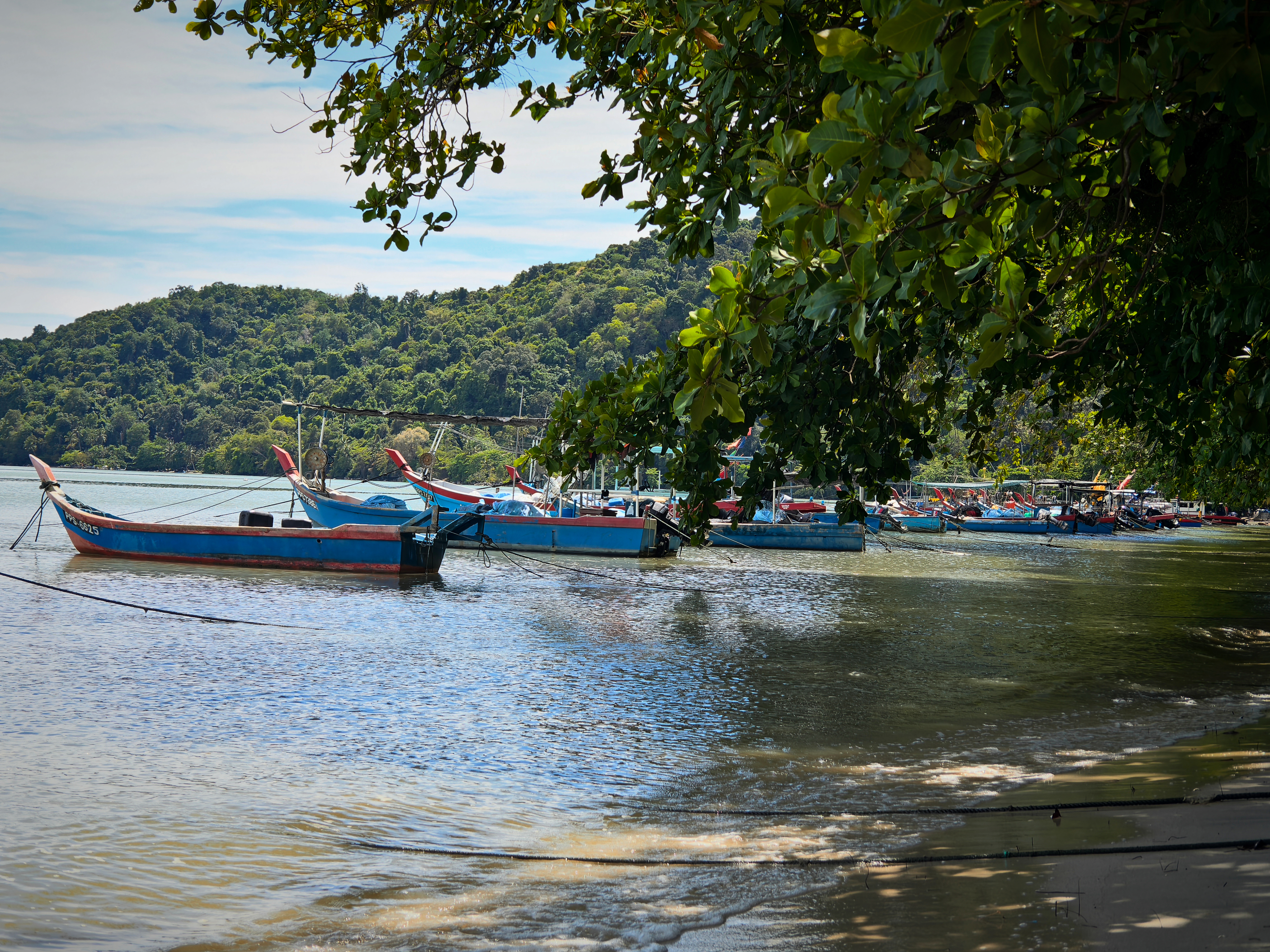
- Interactive map of Gertak Sanggul
- Location within George Town in Penang
- Coordinates: 5°16′56.7336″N 100°11′38.2878″E
- Country: Malaysia
- State: Penang
- City: George Town
- District: Southwest

Area
  - Total: 5.6 km^{2} (2.2 sq mi)

Population (2020)
  - Total: 1,444
  - Density: 260/km^{2} (670/sq mi)

Demographics
  - Ethnic groups: 54.2% Chinese; 43.2% Bumiputera; 43.1% Malay; 0.1% indigenous groups from Sabah and Sarawak; 1.2% Indian; 0.1% Other ethnicities; 1.2% Non-citizens
- Time zone: UTC+8 (MST)
  - Summer (DST): Not observed
- Postal code: 11910

Gertak Sanggul is a suburb of George Town in the Malaysian state of Penang. It is located at the southwestern coast of Penang Island, about 21 km (13 mi) southwest of the city centre. Gertak Sanggul is an agricultural village, with fisheries and pig farming as its economic mainstays.

== Etymology ==
According to urban legend, Gertak Sanggul was named during World War II, when Penang was under Japanese occupation. The Malay ladies in the area, who typically tied their hair into buns (Malay: sanggul), would ride their bicycles along the area's uneven roads, causing their buns to come undone. The Japanese administrators on Penang Island henceforth referred to the area as Gertak Sanggul.

== Geography ==
Map of Gertak Sanggul.
Click link at the top right corner to zoom in.
1 Beach
2 Pasir Panjang
3 Kendi Island

== Demographics ==
Ethnicities within Gertak Sanggul in 2020
Ethnicities / Nationality	Percentage
Chinese	54.2%
Malays	43.1%
Other Bumiputeras	0.1%
Indians	1.2%
Others	0.1%
Non-Malaysians	1.2%

As of 2020, the subdivision of Bukit Pasir Panjang, where Gertak Sanggul is located, was home to a population of 1,444. Ethnic Chinese comprised over 54% of the population, followed by Malays at 43%.

== Transportation ==
The main thoroughfare within Gertak Sanggul is Jalan Gertak Sanggul, which forms part of the pan-island Federal Route 6. The road links the town with Balik Pulau to the north and Teluk Kumbar to the east.

Rapid Penang bus route 308 is the sole public bus service that runs into Gertak Sanggul, connecting the town with a handful of destinations along the eastern seaboard of Penang Island, including Bayan Lepas, Bayan Baru, Queensbay Mall, Universiti Sains Malaysia and Sungai Nibong.

== Education ==
Gertak Sanggul is served by a single primary school, SJK (C) Poi Eng.
