= Bukit Jambul =

- Suburb of George Town
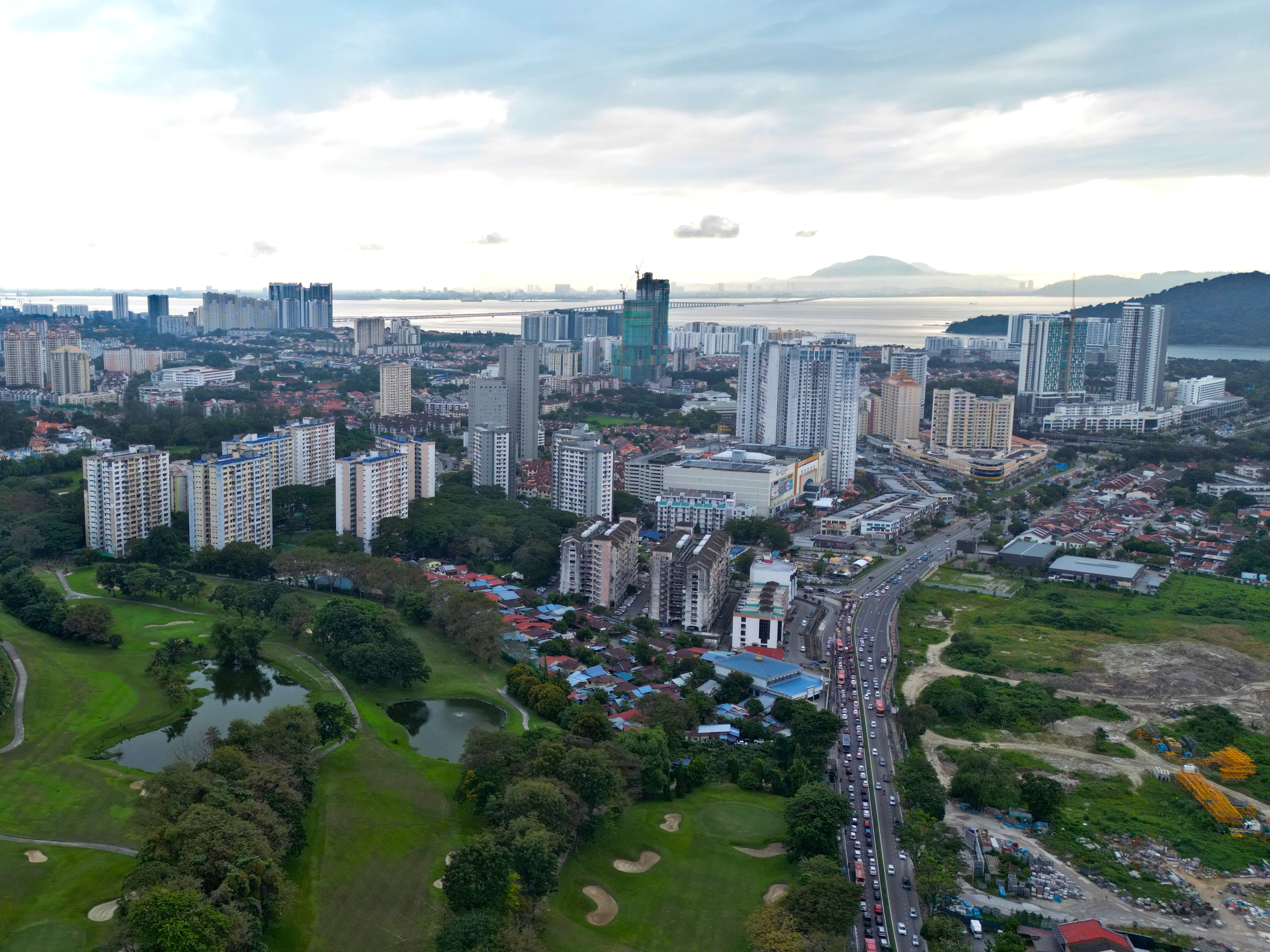

- Location within George Town in Penang
- Coordinates: 5°20′1.3344″N 100°17′23.8452″E
- Country: Malaysia
- State: Penang
- City: George Town
- District: Northeast

Area
  - Total: 32.7 km^{2} (12.6 sq mi)

Population (2020)
  - Total: 226,712
  - Density: 6,930/km^{2} (18,000/sq mi)

Demographics
  - Ethnic groups: 56.2% Chinese; 23.7% Bumiputera; 23.0% Malay; 0.7% indigenous groups from Sabah and Sarawak; 9.4% Indian; 1.0% Other ethnicities; 9.6% Non-citizens
- Time zone: UTC+8 (MST)
  - Summer (DST): Not observed
- Postal code: 11060，11900

Bukit Jambul is a suburb of George Town in the Malaysian state of Penang. Located 9.9 km (6.2 mi) south of the city centre, Bukit Jambul located between Relau, Bayan Baru, Sungai Dua and Sungai Nibong.

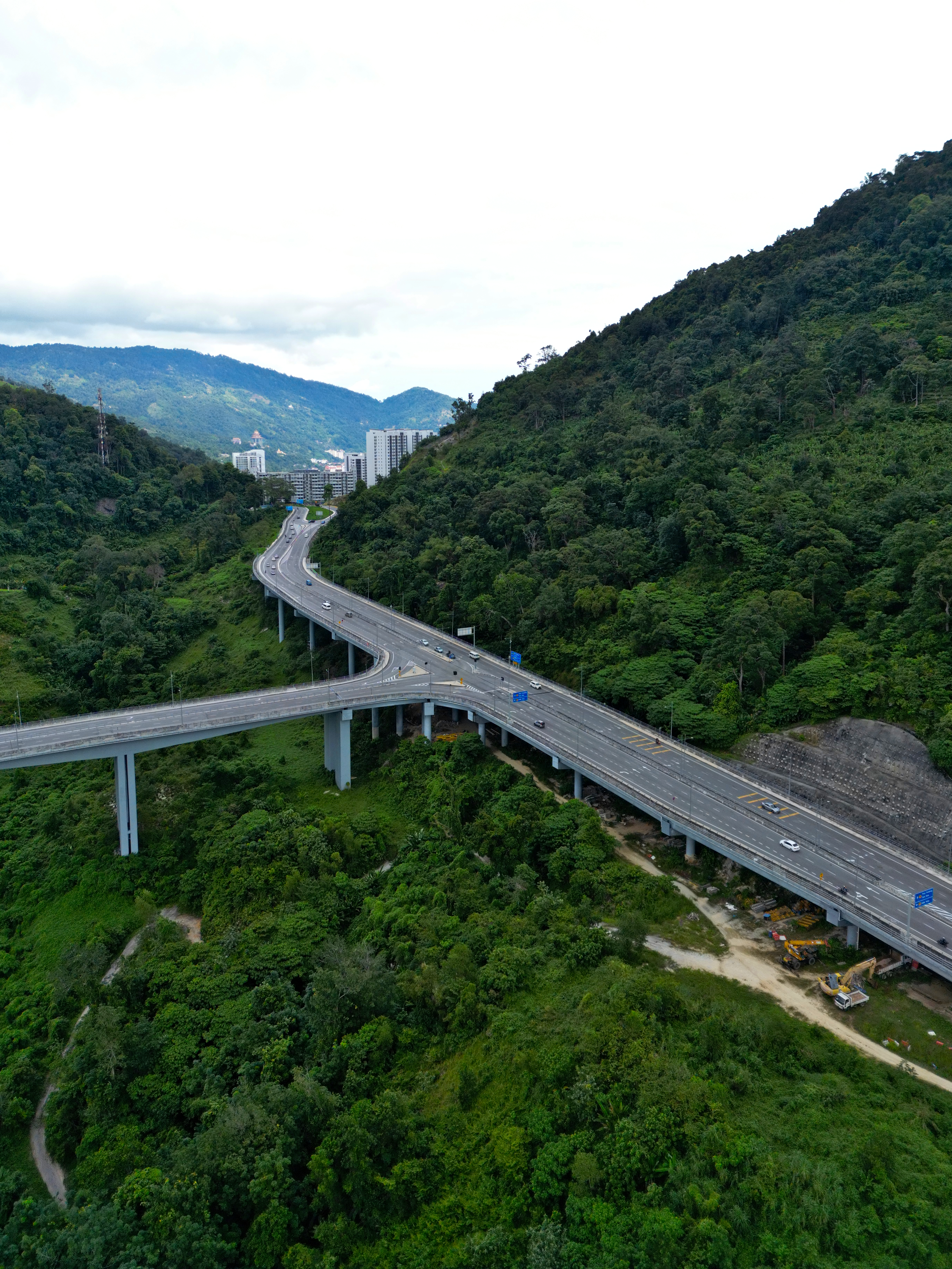
The Jalan Bukit Kukus Paired Road is the tallest expressway in Malaysia, linking Bukit Jambul with Paya Terubong to the north.

== Geography ==
The subdivision of Bandar Bukit Jambul (formerly known as Mukim 13) covers an area of 32.7 km^{2} (12.6 sq mi), forming a corridor that stretches from the central valleys of Penang Island to Jerejak Island off the eastern coast. It encompasses a varied topography and includes several areas, namely Farlim, Paya Terubong, Sungai Dua, Batu Uban and parts of Sungai Nibong.

Map of Bukit Jambul.
Click link at the top right corner to zoom in.
1 Paya Terubong
2 Farlim
3 Bukit Jambul
4 Sungai Dua
5 Batu Uban
6 Kampung Melayu
7 Gambier Heights
8 Jerejak Island
9 Gazumbo Island
10 Sungai Nibong Bus Terminal
11 Sunshine Central
12 All Seasons Place
13 Bukit Jambul Complex
14 Arte S

== Demographics ==
Ethnicities within Bukit Jambul in 2020
Ethnicities / Nationality	Percentage
Chinese	56.2%
Malays	23.0%
Other Bumiputeras	0.7%
Indians	9.4%
Others	1.0%
Non-Malaysians	9.6%

As of 2020, Bukit Jambul was home to a population of 226,712, making it the most populated subdivision within the city of George Town. The suburb had a population density of 6,933/km^{2} (17,960/sq mi). Ethnic Chinese constituted over 56% of Bukit Jambul's population, while Malays formed another 23%. Non-citizens comprised almost 10% of the population, followed by Indians at over 9%.

== Transportation ==
Rapid Penang bus routes 301 and 306 include stops within the neighbourhood of Bukit Jambul. These routes connect the neighbourhood with various destinations within the city, including the Penang International Airport. The neighbourhood is also served by two of Rapid Penang's Congestion Alleviation Transport (CAT) routes - namely Sungai Dua and Bayan Baru routes - which are provided free-of-charge. In 2022, part of the Jalan Bukit Kukus Paired Road was opened for use, intended to alleviate congestion between Bukit Jambul and other suburbs to the north.

Aside from these routes, Rapid Penang operates an additional three cross-strait shuttle bus routes - BEST A, BEST B and BEST C - which mainly cater to industrial workers who commute on a daily basis between Bukit Jambul, the Bayan Lepas Free Industrial Zone and Seberang Perai on the mainland.

Bukit Jambul experiences daily traffic congestion due to its close proximity to the economic centres of Bayan Baru and the Bayan Lepas Free Industrial Zone. In 2022, part of the Jalan Bukit Kukus Paired Road, intended to alleviate congestion between Bukit Jambul and other suburbs to the north, was opened for use.

== Education ==
A total of 10 primary schools, five high schools and an international school are located throughout Bukit Jambul. In addition, the Penang campus of INTI International University is located within the suburb as well, offering various tertiary courses and twinning programmes with foreign universities.

Primary schools

- SK Bukit Gambir
- SJK (C) Chiao Nan
- SK Gelugor
- SJK (C) Keong Hoe
- SJK (C) Kong Min II
- SJK (C) Kwang Hwa
- SJK (C) Min Sin
- SK Seri Indah
- SJK (C) Sin Kang
- SK Sri Aman

High schools

- SMK Air Itam
- SMK Bukit Gambir
- SMK Bukit Jambul
- Phor Tay High School
- SMK Sungai Nibong

International school

- Fairview International School

== Retail ==
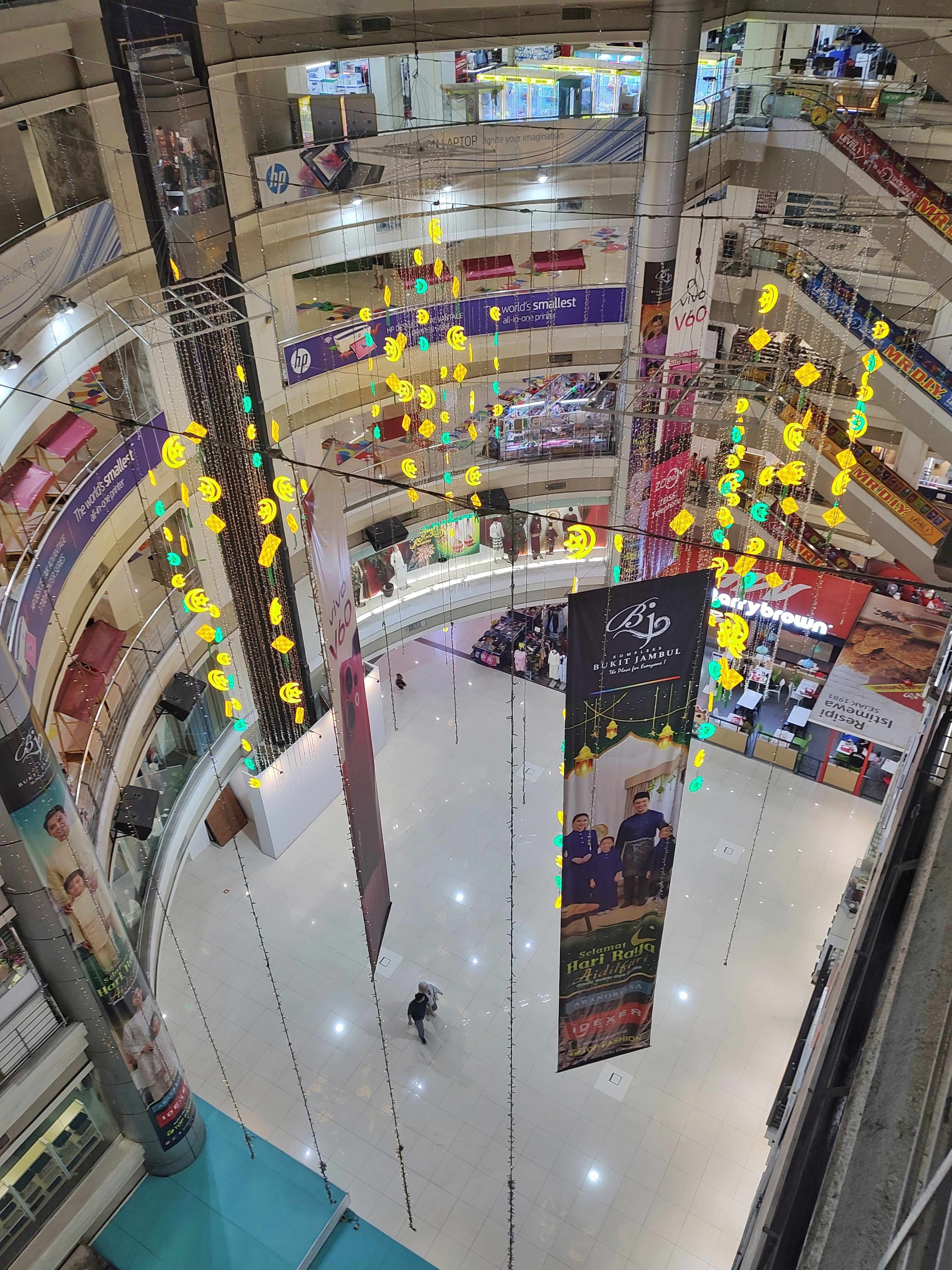
Bukit Jambul Complex atrium

Bukit Jambul is served by neighbourhood retail centres, such as Bukit Jambul Complex, All Seasons Place and Sunshine Central. The six-storey Bukit Jambul Complex at Bukit Jambul was opened in 1997, while All Seasons Place at Farlim was touted as the first strip mall in Penang upon its launch in 2012. In 2024, Suiwah Corporation, a local retail firm, launched Sunshine Central, a 3.64 ha (9.0-acre) mixed-use development that includes a nine-storey shopping mall.

== Sports ==
Opened in 1984, the Penang Golf Club, situated within Bukit Jambul, is the sole 18-hole golf course on Penang Island. The golf course hosted the 1992 Malaysian Open, which was won by Vijay Singh, and was last renovated in 2012.

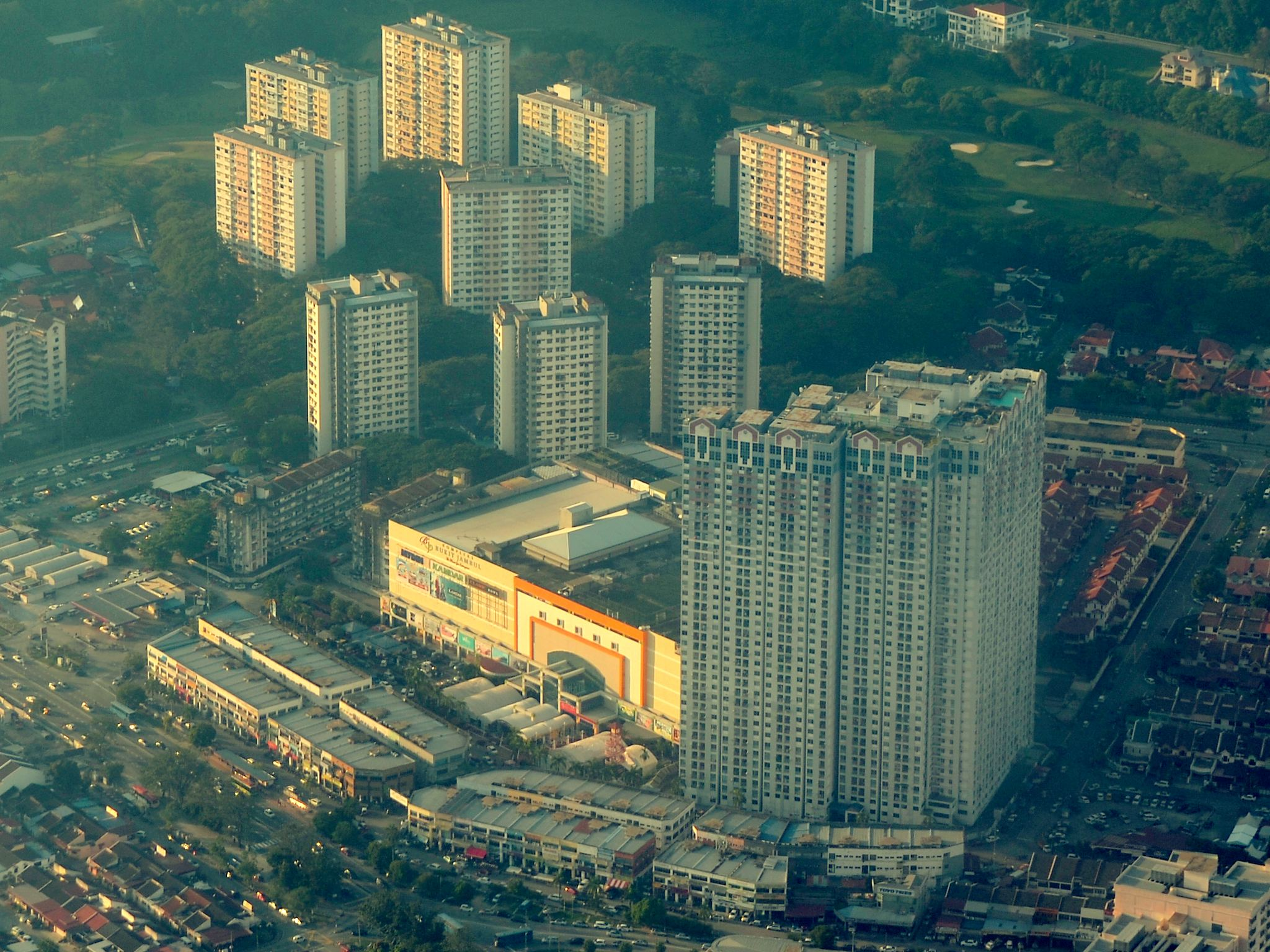
Aerial view of Bukit Jambul Complex
