= Rapid Penang =

Public bus brand in the George Town Conurbation

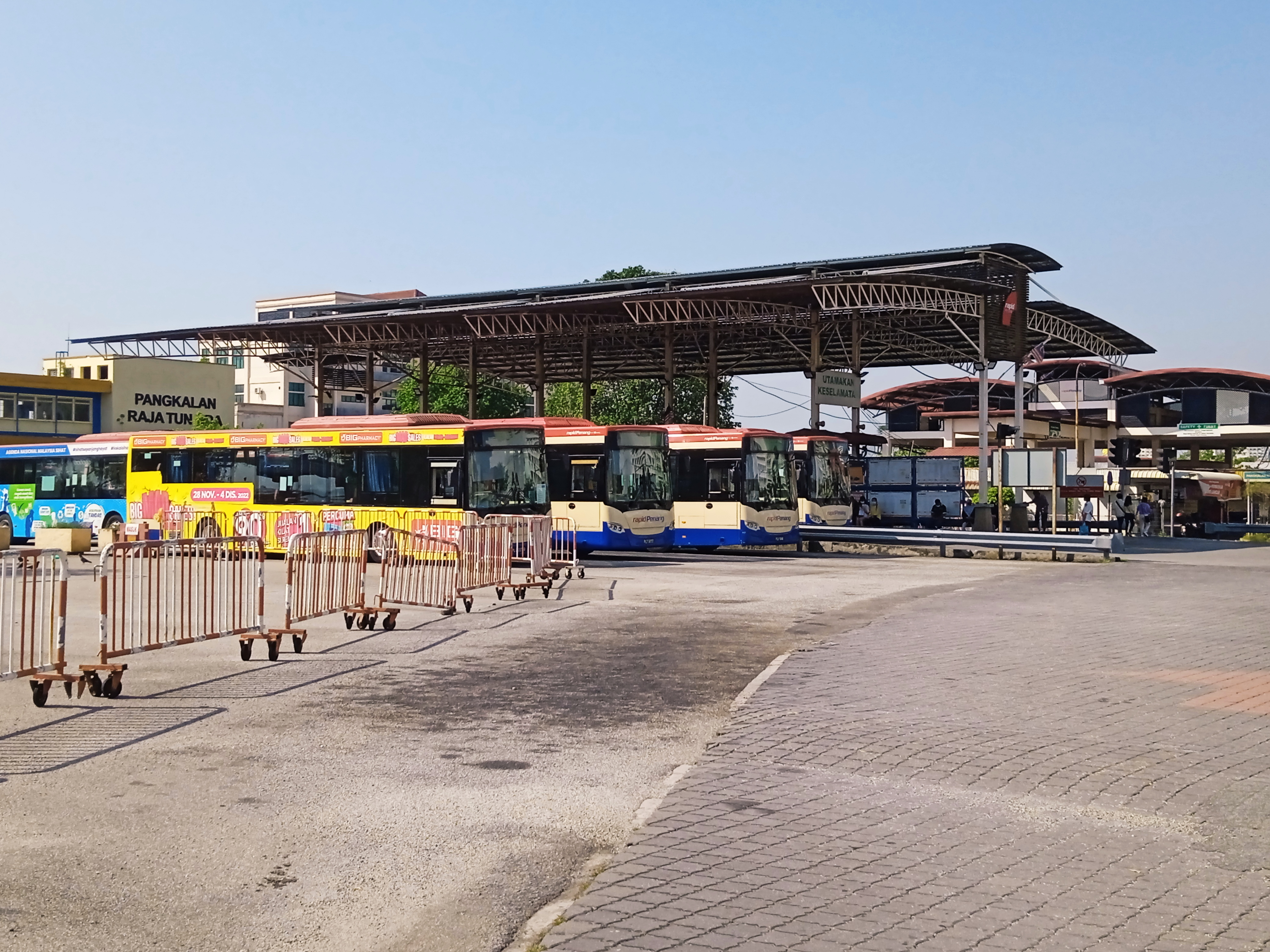
- Weld Quay Bus Terminal in George Town, Penang
- Parent: Prasarana Malaysia
- Founded: 31 July 2007
- Headquarters: George Town
- Service area: George Town Conurbation
- Service type: Public bus
- Routes: 47
- Fleet: 350 buses
- Daily ridership: 31,173 (Q2 2025)
- Annual ridership: 17.40 million (2025) (▲7.0%)
- Operator: Rapid Bus
- Website: https://myrapid.com.my/bus-train/rapid-penang/

Rapid Penang (stylised as rapidPenang) is a public bus brand operating within the George Town Conurbation in Malaysia. Established in 2007 as a subsidiary of Prasarana Malaysia, it serves as the main public transport system within the state of Penang, with routes extending into neighbouring towns in Kedah and Perak. Rapid Penang forms part of Rapid Bus, which also operates public bus services across the Klang Valley.

As of 2025, Rapid Penang's fleet comprises 350 buses operating on a total of 47 routes throughout the conurbation. Additionally, since 2024, Rapid Penang has been expanding its demand-responsive transport (DRT) service, with a fleet of 17 vans to address last mile connectivity at specific locations within Penang.

== History ==
Prior to the introduction of Rapid Penang in 2007, public bus services in Penang had been run by several competing private operators. The operators were plagued by fragmented zoning, inadequate asset maintenance and financial mismanagement.

In 2004, the Yellow Bus Company, one of the largest public bus operators in the state, abruptly ceased operations due to a price war and financial losses. The continued deterioration of Penang's bus operators prompted the state government to intervene. Under Chief Minister Koh Tsu Koon, the state government in 2006 attempted to revive the public bus system by rezoning routes to designated operators. This proved unsuccessful, forcing Koh to seek assistance from the Malaysian federal government.

In 2007, Prasarana Malaysia, a government-owned company, launched Rapid Penang. While some quarters within Penang voiced their objections to the federal takeover of the state's public transportation, Koh's administration defended the move, arguing that federal expertise and financial resources were necessary to improve the public bus system. Rapid Penang initially began its services on 31 July that year with a fleet of 150 buses. Of the 150 buses, 110 were allocated to George Town to service five corridors, while the remaining 40 buses were assigned to Seberang Perai 's three corridors. In 2013, Rapid Penang, along with Rapid KL and Rapid Kuantan, was merged into Rapid Bus. While the Rapid Penang brand is retained, its assets and staff were transferred to the newer entity.

As of 2025, Rapid Penang 's fleet consists of 350 buses operating on a total of 47 routes across the George Town Conurbation. In 2024, a demand-responsive transport (DRT) service was introduced in George Town. This service adopts a ridesharing model akin to Grab, aimed at improving last mile connectivity at areas not accessible by conventional buses. A total of 17 vans were originally deployed at selected suburbs. Rapid Penang has plans to further expand the DRT, with an addition of 21 vans scheduled by June 2025.

== Routes ==
As of 2025, Rapid Penang operates 47 routes across the George Town Conurbation, with some extending into neighbouring Kedah and Perak. Of the 47 routes, 26 are within George Town and 15 are in Seberang Perai. There are two cross-strait routes connecting the two cities. The remaining four routes are interstate services that link Seberang Perai with nearby towns in Kedah and Perak.

Since 2024, Rapid Penang has been expanding its DRT service by deploying vans to address last mile connectivity at specific areas of George Town, such as Ayer Itam, Paya Terubong, Tanjong Tokong, Tanjong Bungah, Bayan Lepas, Jelutong and the city centre. In 2025, the service was extended to the mainland, covering Butterworth and Seberang Jaya.

List of Rapid Penang Bus Routes
Route Number	Origin	Destination	Service Type	First Trip	Last Trip	Frequency	Notes
Penang Island Routes
CAT	Weld Quay	Komtar	Free Shuttle	06:00	23:45	10 - 15 mins	Free shuttle service within George Town heritage zone.
11	Weld Quay	Batu Lanchang	Trunk	05:40	21:35	30 - 40 mins	
12	Weld Quay	Bandar Sri Pinang	Trunk	06:00	19:30	40 - 50 mins	
13	Paya Terubong	Lotus's Penang E-Gate	Trunk	06:20	21:40	35 - 70 mins	
101	Weld Quay	Teluk Bahang	Trunk	05:30	23:30	10 - 12 mins	Via Batu Ferringhi.
102	Weld Quay	Airport	Trunk	06:00	23:35	75 mins	Long-haul route connecting Airport and Teluk Bahang.
103	Komtar	Pulau Tikus	Trunk	05:40	21:30	15 - 20 mins	
104	Komtar	Tanjung Bungah	Trunk	06:30	21:10	80 mins	
201	Weld Quay	Paya Terubong (via Air Itam)	Trunk	05:30	18:20	10 - 15 mins	
202	Weld Quay	Paya Terubong (via Farlim)	Trunk	05:50	23:30	10 - 12 mins	
203	Weld Quay	Pekan Air Itam (via Farlim)	Trunk	06:20	21:10	90 mins	
204	Weld Quay	Penang Hill	Trunk	05:30	23:30	35 - 45 mins	Connects to Penang Hill Funicular.
206	Weld Quay	Lotus's Penang E-Gate	Trunk	06:00	22:30	100 mins	
301	Weld Quay	Relau	Trunk	05:45	23:30	15 mins	
302	Weld Quay	Batu Maung	Trunk	05:30	23:30	20 - 30 mins	Via Jalan Bukit Gambir.
303	Weld Quay	Bukit Gedung	Trunk	06:00	22:35	40 - 45 mins	
304	Gurney Drive	Bukit Gedung	Trunk	05:30	22:35	45 - 60 mins	
306	Airport	Penang General Hospital	Trunk	05:30	22:35	40 mins	
308	Sungai Nibong	Gertak Sanggul	Trunk	06:00	22:30	80 mins	
T310	Universiti Sains Malaysia	Queensbay Mall	Trunk	06:00	22:30	20 - 30 mins	Feeder route.
401	Weld Quay	Teluk Kumbar	Trunk	05:55	22:30	60 mins	
401E	Weld Quay	Balik Pulau Terminal	Trunk	05:45	23:30	20 mins	Express service via Tun Dr. Lim Chong Eu Expressway & Queensbay.
502	Weld Quay	Pekan Genting, Balik Pulau	Trunk	05:30	23:30	30 - 40 mins	
403	Balik Pulau Terminal	Pulau Betong	Trunk	06:00	19:00	90 - 120 mins	
404	Balik Pulau Terminal	Pantai Acheh	Trunk	06:00	19:15	105 - 120 mins	
CT13	Terminal Bas Bayan Baru	Seberang Jaya	Free Shuttle	06:00	20:20	60 - 65 mins	Known as "CAT Bridge", cross-strait service via Penang Bridge. Operates during peak hours only.
CT14	Komtar	Bukit Mertajam	Free Shuttle	06:00	19:00	30 mins	Known as "CAT Bridge", cross-strait service via Penang Bridge. Operates during peak hours only.
CT15	Komtar	Hospital Pulau Pinang	Free Shuttle	06:00	20:00	20 mins	Known as "CAT Hospital", this service loops from Komtar to Hospital Pulau Pinang to Komtar.
Seberang Perai Routes (Mainland)
601	Penang Sentral	Kepala Batas	Trunk	06:00	22:30	30 - 40 mins	
603	Penang Sentral	Kuala Muda	Trunk	07:10	22:30	80 - 90 mins	
604	Penang Sentral	Taman Desa Murni	Trunk	07:10	18:20	140 - 180 mins	
605	Penang Sentral	Teluk Air Tawar	Trunk	06:15	20:00	60 - 70 mins	
613	Penang Sentral	Padang Serai	Trunk	06:20	22:30	70 - 80 mins	
701	Penang Sentral	Bukit Mertajam	Trunk	06:15	22:30	15 - 25 mins	
606	Bukit Mertajam	Kepala Batas	Trunk	08:00	17:15	180 mins	
610	Kepala Batas	Tasek Gelugor	Trunk	06:00	-	-	One trip only. Loop service.
702	Penang Sentral	Bukit Mertajam	Trunk	06:00	22:30	45 mins	Via Jalan Permatang Pauh.
703	Penang Sentral	Seberang Jaya	Trunk	06:00	22:30	25 - 50 mins	Serves Bandar Sunway
706	Penang Sentral	Taman Pelangi	Trunk	07:30	17:25	150 mins	
707	Bukit Mertajam	Taman Pelangi	Trunk	07:30	20:00	180 mins	
708	Bukit Mertajam	Junjung	Trunk	07:30	18:15	155 - 160 mins	
709	Penang Sentral	Machang Bubok	Trunk	06:00	19:50	110 - 130 mins	
801	Penang Sentral	Nibong Tebal	Trunk	05:40	22:30	40 - 50 mins	
EB60	Penang Sentral	Sungai Petani	Trunk	06:30	22:30	30 - 45 mins	Intercity route to Kedah.
EB80	Penang Sentral	Parit Buntar	Trunk	07:10	22:30	60 mins	Intercity route to Perak.
802	Bukit Mertajam	Nibong Tebal	Trunk	06:00	22:00	60 mins	
803	Nibong Tebal	Sungai Acheh	Trunk	06:00	14:00	-	Two trips only.

== Fleet ==
As of 2025, Rapid Penang's fleet consists of 350 buses. As with other Prasarana brands such as Rapid KL, Rapid Penang's bus fleet is managed by Rapid Bus.

Model	Image	Year Introduced	Bodywork	Unit Introduced	Notes/Comments
Dong Feng		2007	Scomi Coach (Formerly MTrans)	3	Retired
Higer		2007	SKS Bus, BadanBas, Pioneer	40	Retired
Higer KLQ6886G		2026	Go Automobile Manufacturing Sdn Bhd	?	75 of these buses to be delivered to Rapid Penang to replace the ageing vehicles
King Long		2007	DRB-Hicom Defense Technology	40	Retired
Scania K270UB		2009	DRB-Hicom Defense Technology	30 (12m); 170 (10.5m)	
Scania K250UB		2013	DRB-Hicom Defense Technology, Gemilang Coachworks	120	
Alexander Dennis Enviro500 MMC		2016, 2022		3 (with an additional 30 to be added by 2017)	"Due to operational reasons, RapidPenang's fleet of Alexander Dennis Enviro500 MMCs have been transferred to RapidKL's fleet" Was used for routes 101, 102 and 301 on Penang Island Reintroduced in February 2022 for routes 301 and 302.
Alexander Dennis Enviro200		2017		?	Transferred to RapidKL's fleet
Hino Poncho		2021			Transferred to RapidKL's fleet
CAM Placer-X A4		2024			In service as part of the DRT (Rapid On-Demand) fleet
Foton AUV C12 BJ6129EVCA		2026		?	Part of the new EV fleet expansion: Expected to begin service by the end of 2026
Golden Dragon		2026		?	Part of the new EV fleet expansion: Expected to begin service by the end of 2026

== See also ==
- Penang Hop-On Hop-Off
- Prasarana Malaysia Berhad
  - Rapid Ferry Sdn Bhd
  - Rapid Bus Sdn Bhd
    - Rapid KL
      - B1 BRT Sunway Line
      - B2 BRT Federal Line
    - Rapid Kuantan
