= Farlim =

Bandar Baru Air Itam
- Neighbourhood of George Town
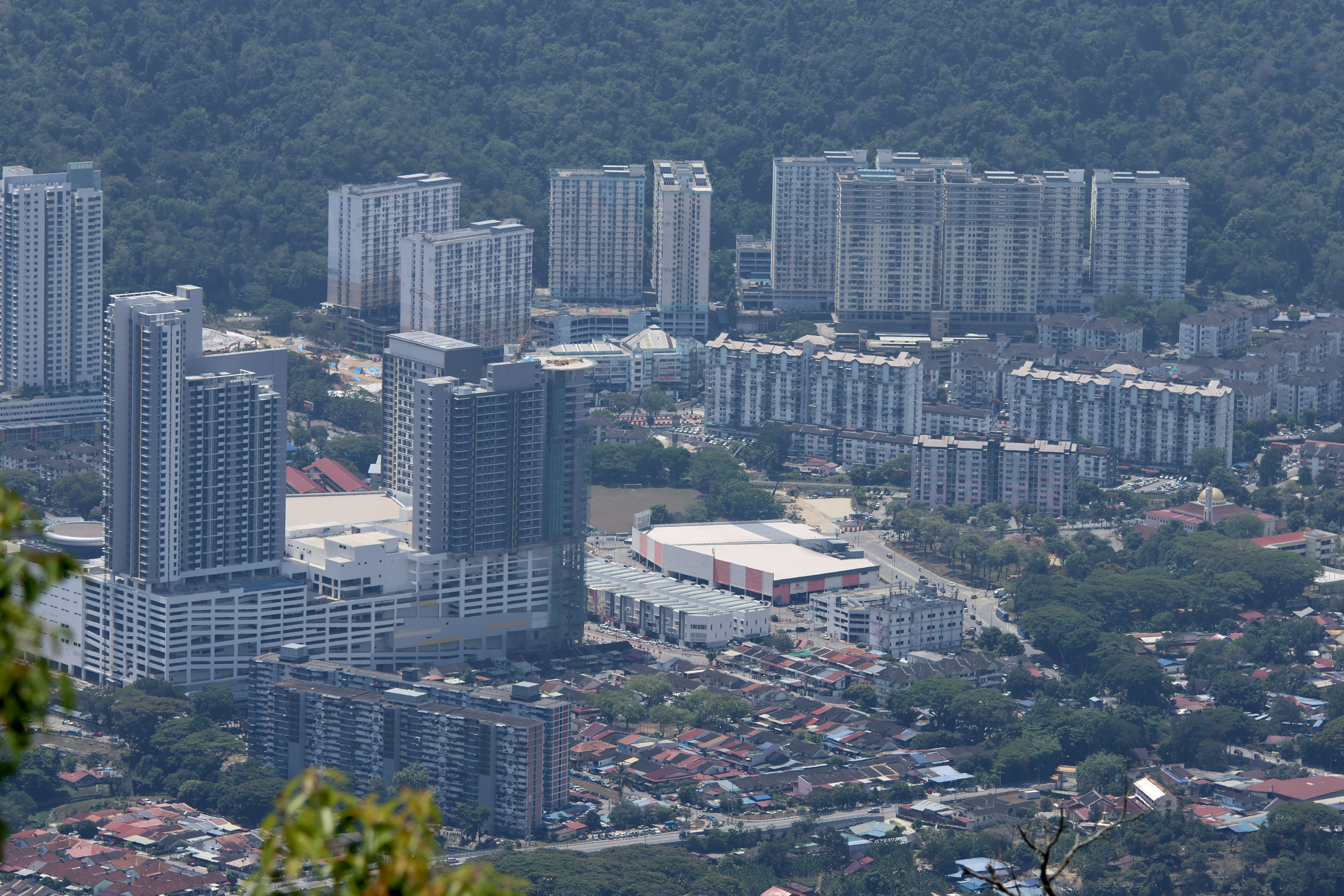
- Interactive map of Bandar Baru Air Itam
- Location within George Town in Penang
- Coordinates: 5°23′15.8094″N 100°16′59.0376″E
- Country: Malaysia
- State: Penang
- City: George Town
- District: Northeast
- Founded: 1982
- Time zone: UTC+8 (MST)
  - Summer (DST): Not observed
- Postal code: 11500

Farlim, officially Bandar Baru Ayer Itam, is a residential neighbourhood within the city of George Town in the Malaysian state of Penang. Located 6 km (3.7 mi) southwest of the city centre, the township was created in the 1980s. Over the recent decades, Farlim has witnessed rapid development with several residential and commercial developments within the area.

== History ==
The area where Farlim is located was previously known as Thean Teik Estate, which was named after Khoo Thean Teik, a local Chinese merchant. The area was owned by the Khoo Kongsi, a Chinese clan association in which Khoo was a director.

In 1978, Khoo Kongsi had reached an agreement with Farlim Group to develop Thean Teik Estate into a residential township. At the time, the project was the single largest property development ever undertaken by the private sector on Penang Island, with an area of 356 acres (1,440,000 m^{2}) being originally earmarked for development. However, the commencement of construction works in 1982 was met by deadly protests by local residents. In the incident which pitted the residents against the police, one resident was killed and another four were injured.

== Transportation ==
Thean Teik Road and Thean Teik Highway are the two major roads that cut through the township. The former links Ayer Itam Road and the Paya Terubong suburb to the southwest, whereas the latter serves as a major thoroughfare between Paya Terubong and Batu Lanchang to the east. Construction of the 6 km (3.7 mi) long Ayer Itam–Tun Dr Lim Chong Eu Expressway Bypass, part of the Penang Transport Master Plan, is expected to be completed by 2025. The bypass will offer a direct route to the Tun Dr Lim Chong Eu Expressway and it is projected to reduce commuting time by 50%.

Rapid Penang bus routes 13, 202, 203 and 306 also include stops within Farlim, thus connecting the township with the city centre, the Penang International Airport and Queensbay Mall, as well as the Paya Terubong and Gelugor suburbs.

== Education ==
There are two primary schools and a high school within the Farlim neighbourhood.

Primary schools

- SK Seri Indah
- SJK (C) Chiao Nan
- SJK (C) Sin Kang

High school

- SMK Air Itam

== Shopping ==
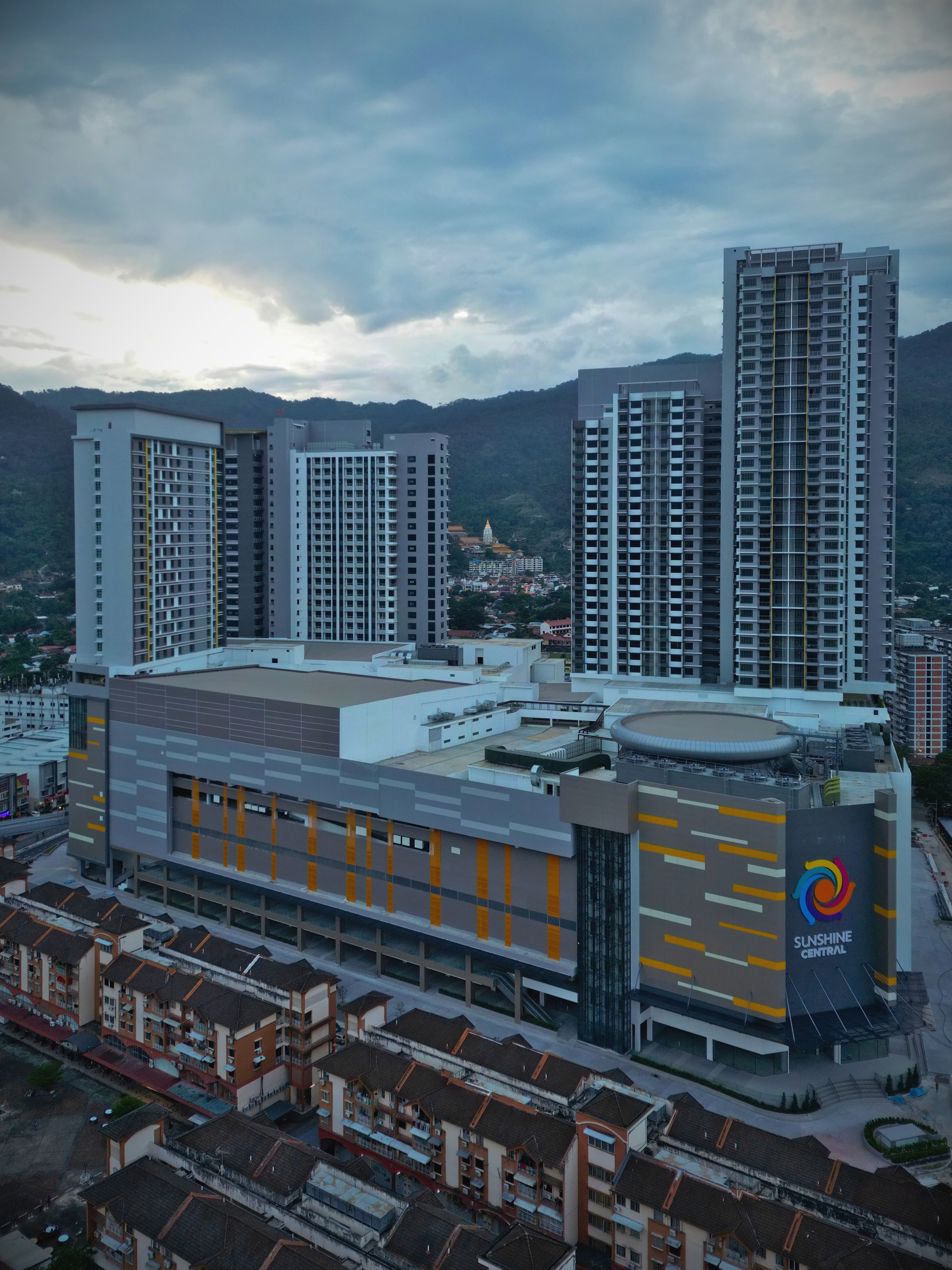
Sunshine Central was opened in 2024.

All Seasons Place, Penang's first and only strip mall, was completed in 2012 and serves as the sole shopping mall within Farlim. It is anchored by HeroMarket, replacing the previous Giant and consists of several eateries and health-related outlets which are arranged along the Thean Teik Highway. In 2024, Suiwah Corporation, a local retail firm, launched Sunshine Central, a 3.64 ha (9.0-acre) mixed-use development that includes a nine-storey shopping mall. The local community's retail needs are also met by a Bandar Baru supermarket at the heart of the township.

== See also ==
- Ayer Itam
