= Balik Pulau =

- Suburb of George Town and district capital
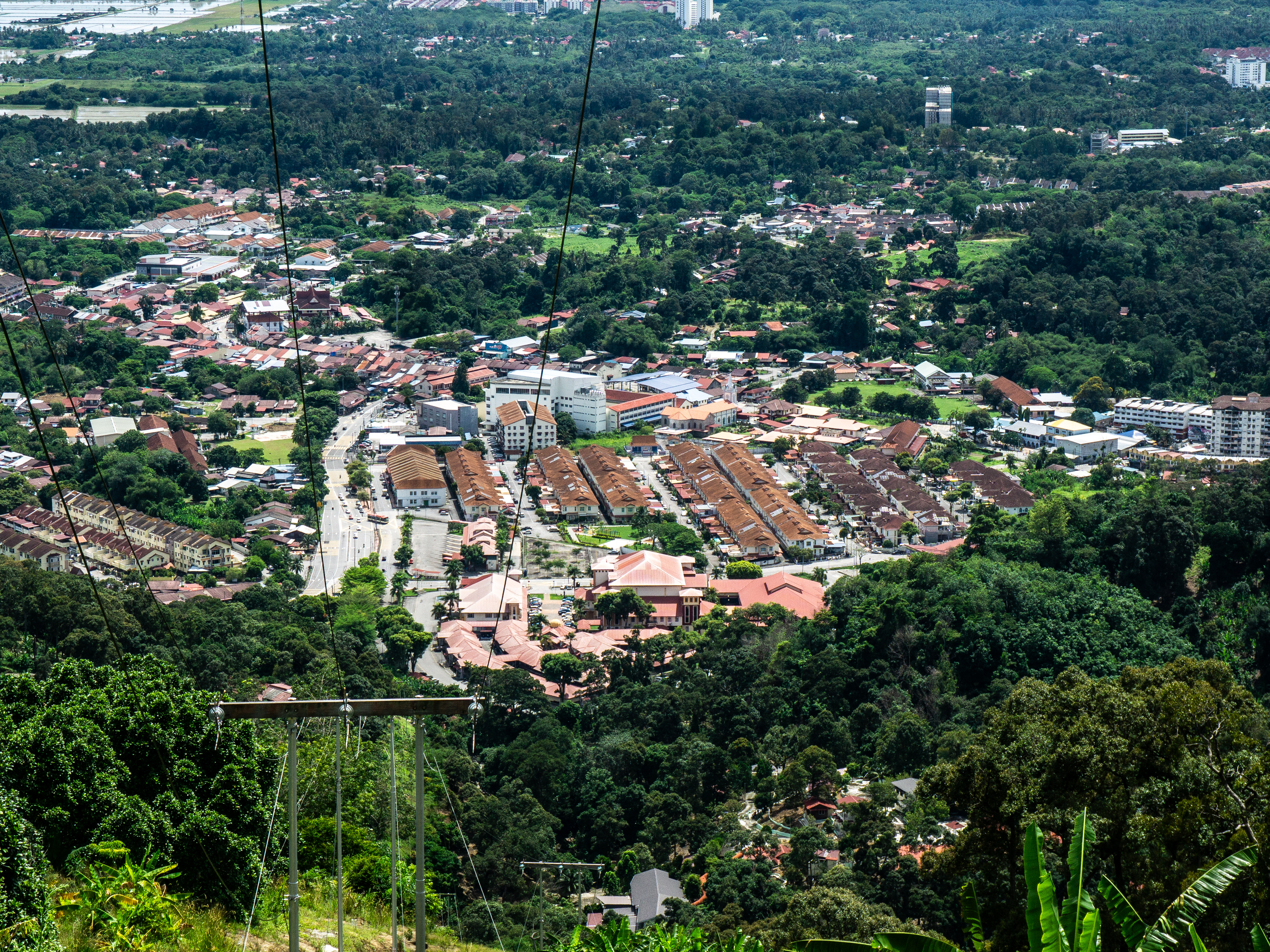
- Interactive map of Balik Pulau
- Location within George Town in Penang
- Coordinates: 5°21′N 100°14′E
- Country: Malaysia
- State: Penang
- City: George Town
- District: Southwest
- Founded: 1794

Area
  - Total: 0.1 km^{2} (0.039 sq mi)

Population (2020)
  - Total: 109
  - Density: 1,100/km^{2} (2,800/sq mi)

Demographics
  - Ethnic groups: 76.1% Chinese; 11.0% Bumiputera; 11.0% Malay; 11.9% Indian; 0.9% Non-citizens
- Time zone: UTC+8 (MST)
  - Summer (DST): Not observed
- Postal code: 11000

Balik Pulau is a suburb of George Town within the Malaysian state of Penang. Located 12.7 km (7.9 mi) southwest of the city centre, it lies near the southwestern corner of Penang Island and is also the administrative seat of the island's Southwest district.

Balik Pulau was established in 1794 as an agricultural village by the British East India Company. To this day, the economy of Balik Pulau still relies heavily on agriculture; Penang's most famous produce, including nutmegs, cloves and durians, are grown and harvested around the suburb. While Balik Pulau is generally seen as quieter in comparison to the bustling city centre on the other side of the island, urbanisation has also reached the suburb in recent years, with more residential developments being planned within the area.

== Etymology ==
Balik Pulau means 'the back of the island' in Malay. It refers to the suburb's location at the western side of Penang Island, geographically separated from the city centre by the island's central hills.

== History ==
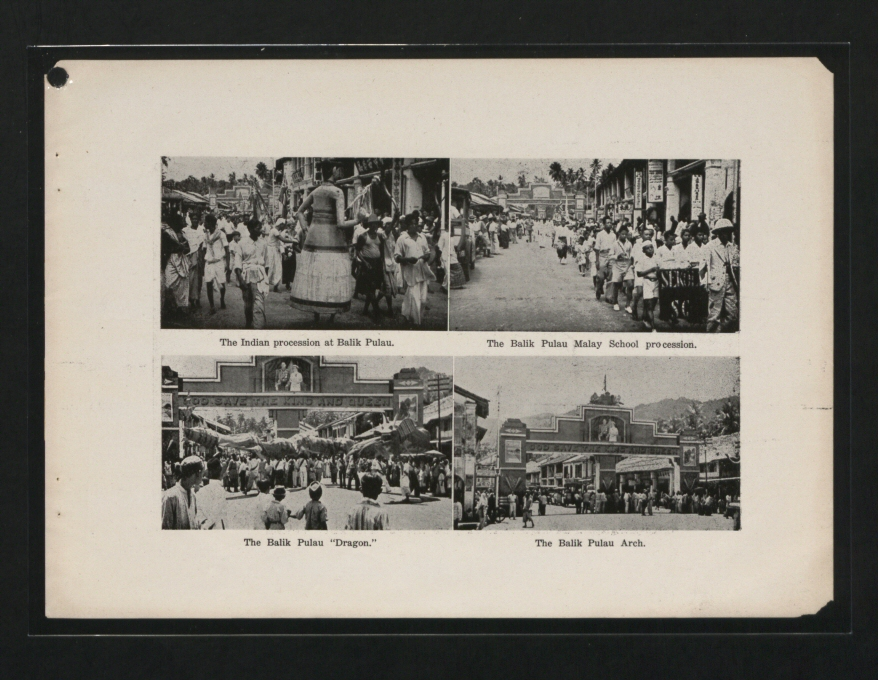
A gallery of images depicting the various cultural processions in Balik Pulau in 1937, to celebrate the coronation of George VI.

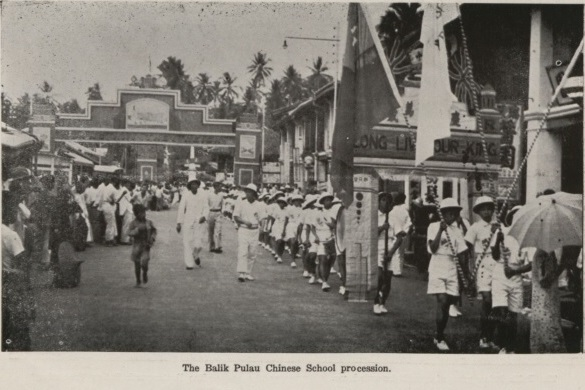
The Balik Pulau Chinese School procession in 1937.

The first clove and nutmeg plantations in Balik Pulau were set up by the British East India Company in 1794. During the early years of Company rule on Penang Island (then the Prince of Wales Island), spice cultivation was encouraged as a means to cover the administrative costs of the island. The British also intended to turn the Prince of Wales Island into a centre for spice production in Southeast Asia in order to break the Dutch monopoly of the spice trade at the time.

During the first half of the 19th century, the clove and nutmeg farms of Balik Pulau attracted Malay refugees fleeing the Siamese invasion of Kedah, as well as Chinese immigrants who were then employed at the farms.

The centre of Balik Pulau, also known colloquially as 'Kongsi' (meaning 'to share' in Malay), was apparently named after the communal wooden longhouses that once existed within the area. Residents of various ethnicities, who worked at the plantations surrounding Balik Pulau, resided in these longhouses, hence the name. Balik Pulau developed towards the late 19th century with the addition of banks, schools, shops and a colonial fountain, which was erected in the late 19th century by a local Chinese businessman, Koh Seang Tat.

For much of its history, Balik Pulau has been a quiet agricultural town, in stark contrast to the bustling city centre at the eastern side of Penang Island. As agriculture does not feature prominently in Penang's economy, Balik Pulau is said to have the last remaining paddy fields in all of George Town. On the other hand, the spillover of urbanisation from the eastern seaboard of the city is also gathering pace in Balik Pulau, with residential properties are being planned for the suburb in recent years.

== Geography ==
Map of Balik Pulau.
Click link at the top right corner to zoom in.
1 Balik Pulau roundabout
2 District Land Office
3 Balik Pulau Hospital

== Demographics ==
Ethnicities within Balik Pulau in 2020
Ethnicities / Nationality	Percentage
Chinese	76.1%
Indians	11.9%
Malays	11.0%
Non-Malaysians	0.9%

As of 2020, Balik Pulau was home to a population of 109. Ethnic Chinese comprised more than three-quarters of the population, followed by Indians at almost 12% and Malays at 11%.

== Transportation ==
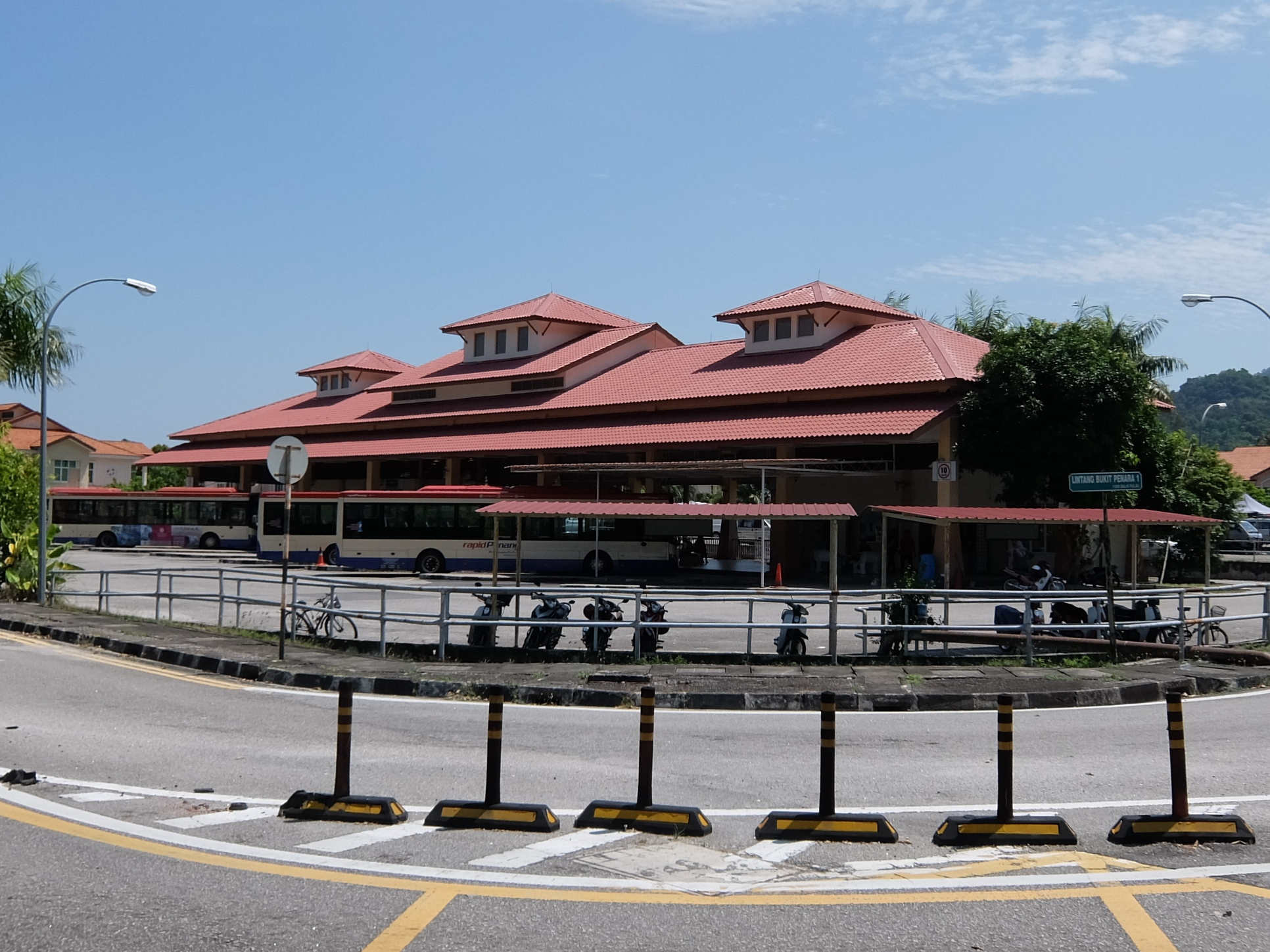
Balik Pulau Bus Terminal

Balik Pulau is served by three major roads which intersect within the centre of the suburb. Jalan Balik Pulau connects the suburb with the fishing village of Gertak Sanggul near the southwestern tip of Penang Island. As the road is also part of the pan-island Federal Route 6 which loops around Penang Island, it also links Balik Pulau with the other major urban centres on the island.

The eastbound Jalan Tun Sardon stretches through the island's central hills, providing a more direct link towards Paya Terubong and Bukit Jambul, while the north-bound Jalan Sungai Pinang leads towards Teluk Bahang near the northwestern tip of Penang Island.

In addition, six Rapid Penang bus routes include stops within Balik Pulau - 401, 401E, 403, 404, 501 and 502. These bus routes link Balik Pulau with the city centre, the Penang International Airport, Queensbay Mall, Bayan Baru and Teluk Bahang. Aside from these routes, in 2018, Rapid Penang launched a free-of-charge transit service within Balik Pulau, known as the Congestion Alleviation Transport (CAT).

== Health care ==
The basic health care needs of Balik Pulau's residents are served by the Balik Pulau Hospital, a public hospital located within the suburb. Run by Malaysia's Ministry of Health, it is one of the six public hospitals within Penang. The hospital is equipped with 71 beds and provides, among others, haemodialysis, emergency and infectious disease control services.

== Tourist attractions ==
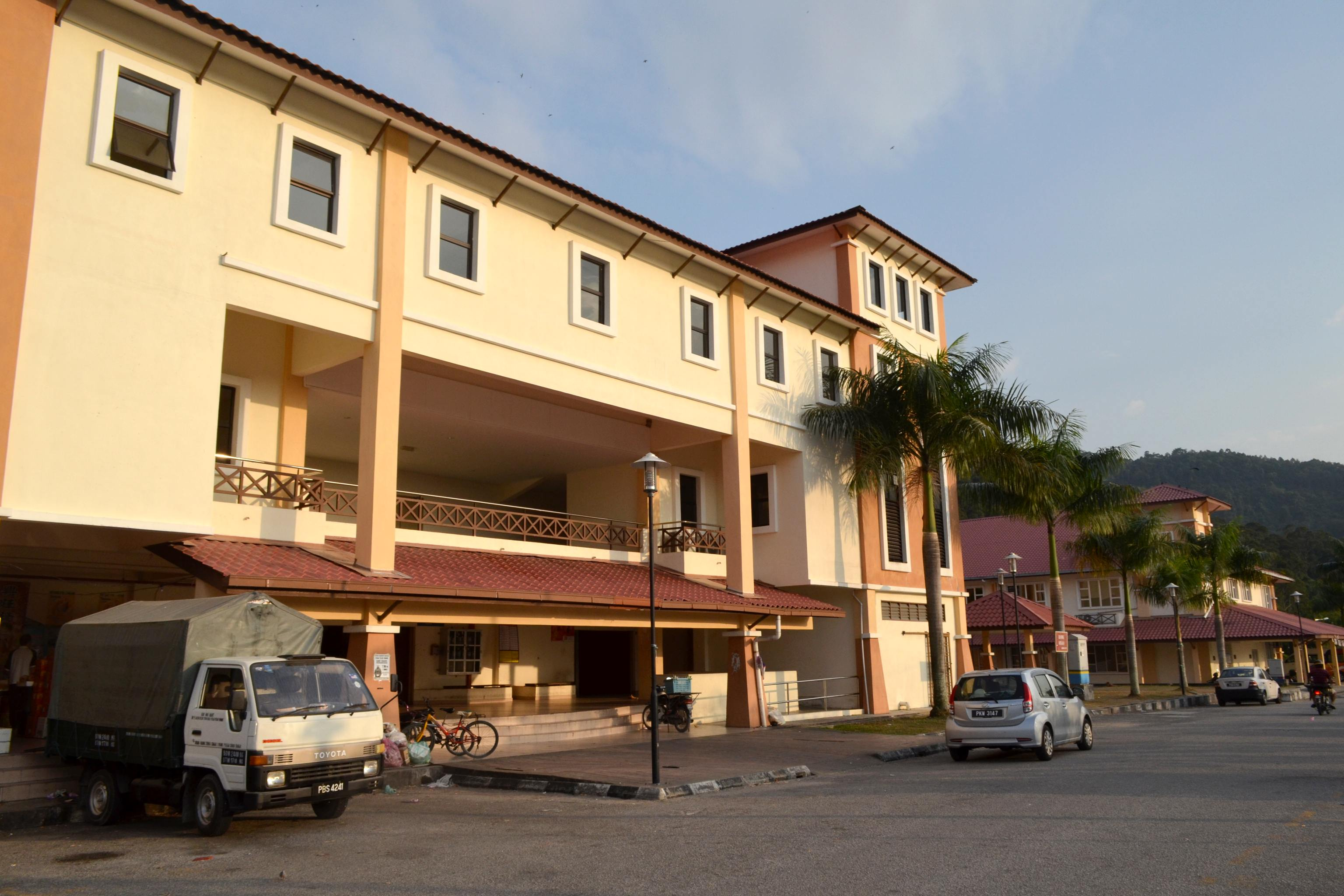
Balik Pulau market

Balik Pulau's attractions are more agricultural, alluding to the huge role agriculture has played in the suburb's economy and its laid-back pace of life. The suburb is famous for some of Penang's most well-known products - nutmegs, durians and cloves. In recent years, agricultural tourism is booming in Balik Pulau, as tourists from other states and abroad flock to the suburb to sample fresh durians and nutmegs. For instance, Balik Pulau's durian orchards, which produce a wide variety of durian cultivars, are best visited during the durian harvesting season between May and August each year. Balik Pulau's nutmeg farms and shops also offer samples of nutmeg fruits and products, including nutmeg juice.

== See also ==
- Pantai Acheh
