= Paya Terubong =

- Suburb of George Town
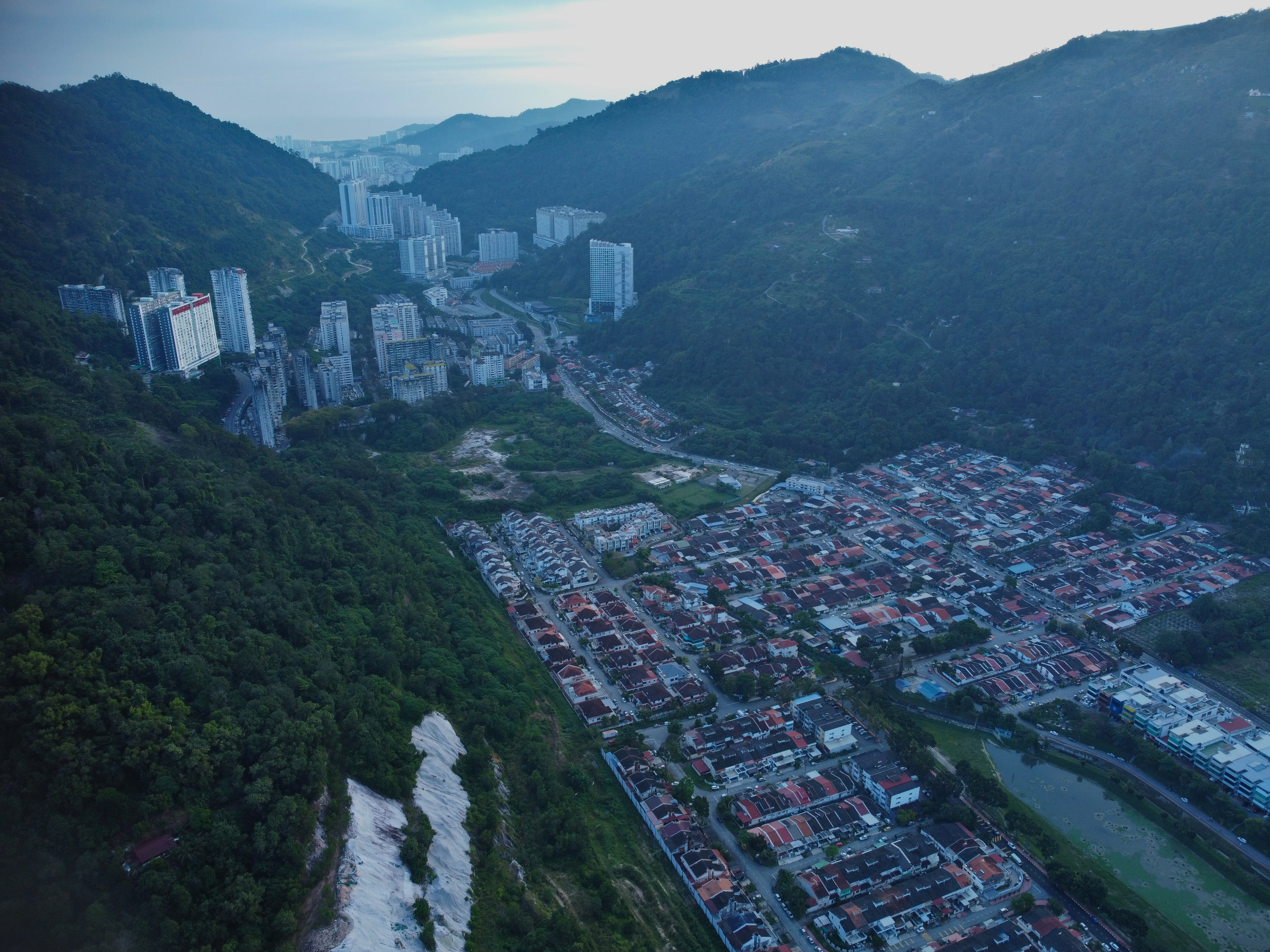

- Location within George Town in Penang
- Coordinates: 5°22′22″N 100°16′47″E
- Country: Malaysia
- State: Penang
- City: George Town
- District: Northeast
- Township: Bukit Jambul
- Time zone: UTC+8 (MST)
  - Summer (DST): Not observed
- Postal code: 11060

Paya Terubong is a suburb of George Town in the Malaysian state of Penang. Located nearly 7 km (4.3 mi) southwest of the city centre, it is nestled within the central valleys of Penang Island and south of Air Itam. Originally an agricultural village, rapid development in the last decades of the 20th century has transformed the area into a residential suburb.

== Etymology ==
Paya Terubong was named after a species of grass known in Malay as terubong. Its scientific name is Cyrtococcum oxyphyllum.

== History ==
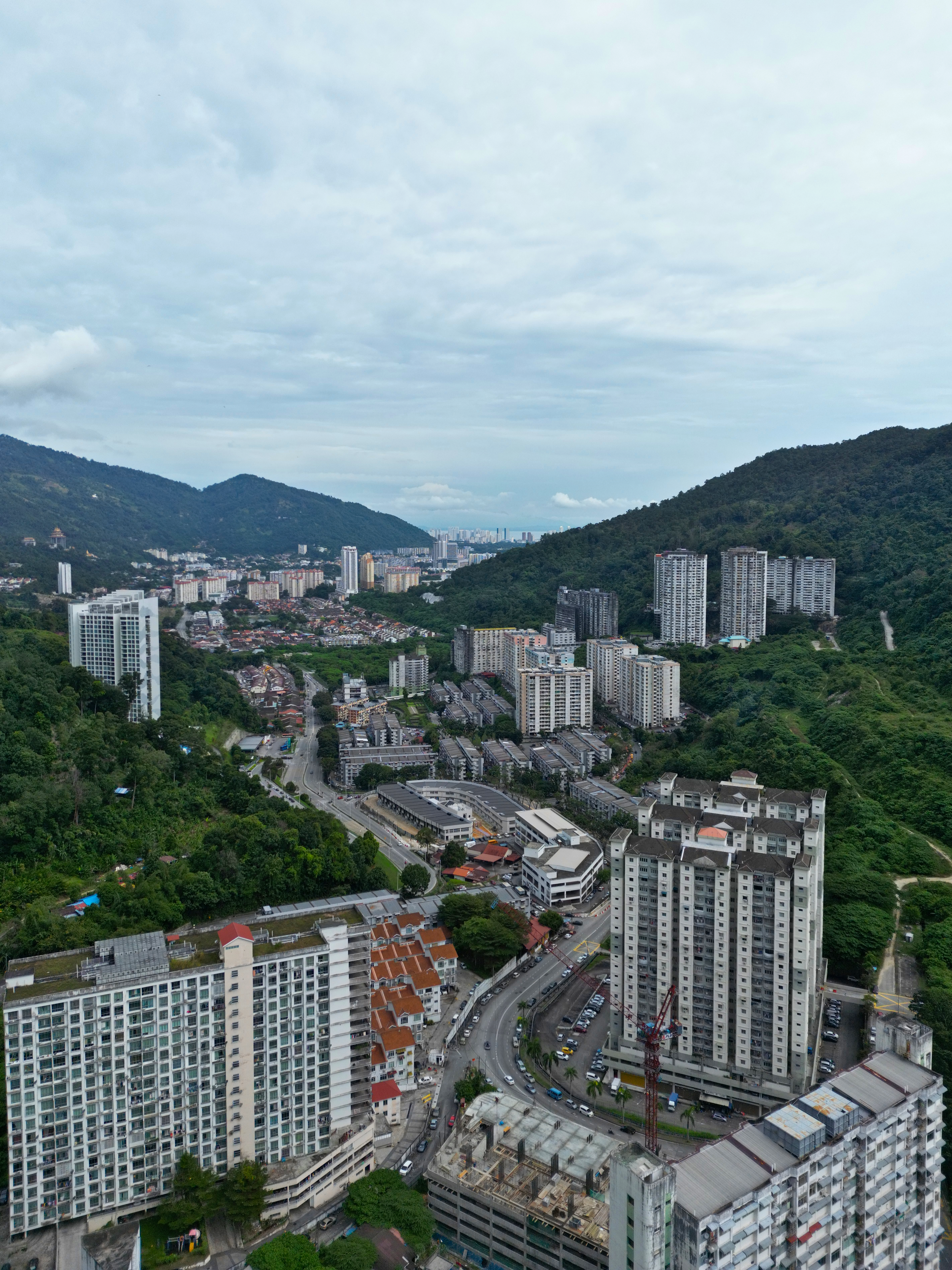
Residential projects now dot Paya Terubong's landscape, a far cry from its agricultural past.

Similar to Ayer Itam to the north, Paya Terubong was where agricultural farms were established, providing fresh produce to be traded in markets elsewhere in George Town. In the past, Paya Terubong Road was merely a hill path.

The area was developed in the 1980s with the construction of residential high-rises to alleviate land scarcity in the city. New townships such as Farlim were created, leading to an increase in population.

== Transportation ==
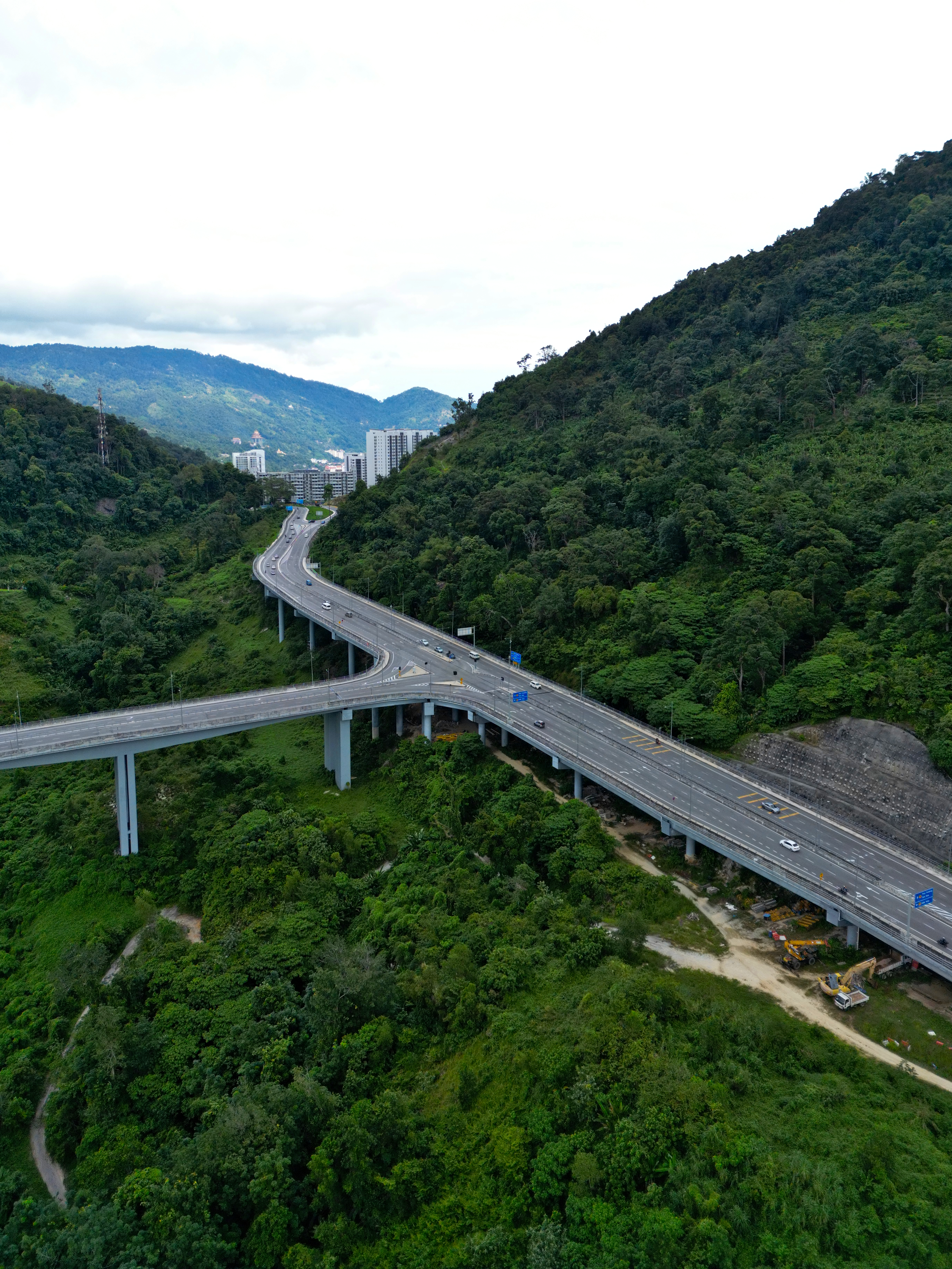
The Jalan Bukit Kukus Paired Road is the tallest expressway in Malaysia.

Paya Terubong Road remains the main thoroughfare within the suburb. The road connects with Ayer Itam Road to the north and stretches towards the suburb of Relau near the southern end of the central valleys. As Paya Terubong Road is the sole road which links the north and south of Penang Island through the central valleys, heavy traffic congestion occurs on a frequent basis. In 2022, part of the Jalan Bukit Kukus Paired Road was opened for use, intended to alleviate congestion between Paya Terubong and other suburbs to the south.

Rapid Penang buses 13, 201, 202, 306 and 502 serve the residents of the suburb, by connecting Paya Terubong with the city centre and various other destinations, such as Ayer Itam, the Penang International Airport, Queensbay Mall and Balik Pulau.
