= Ayer Itam =

- Suburb
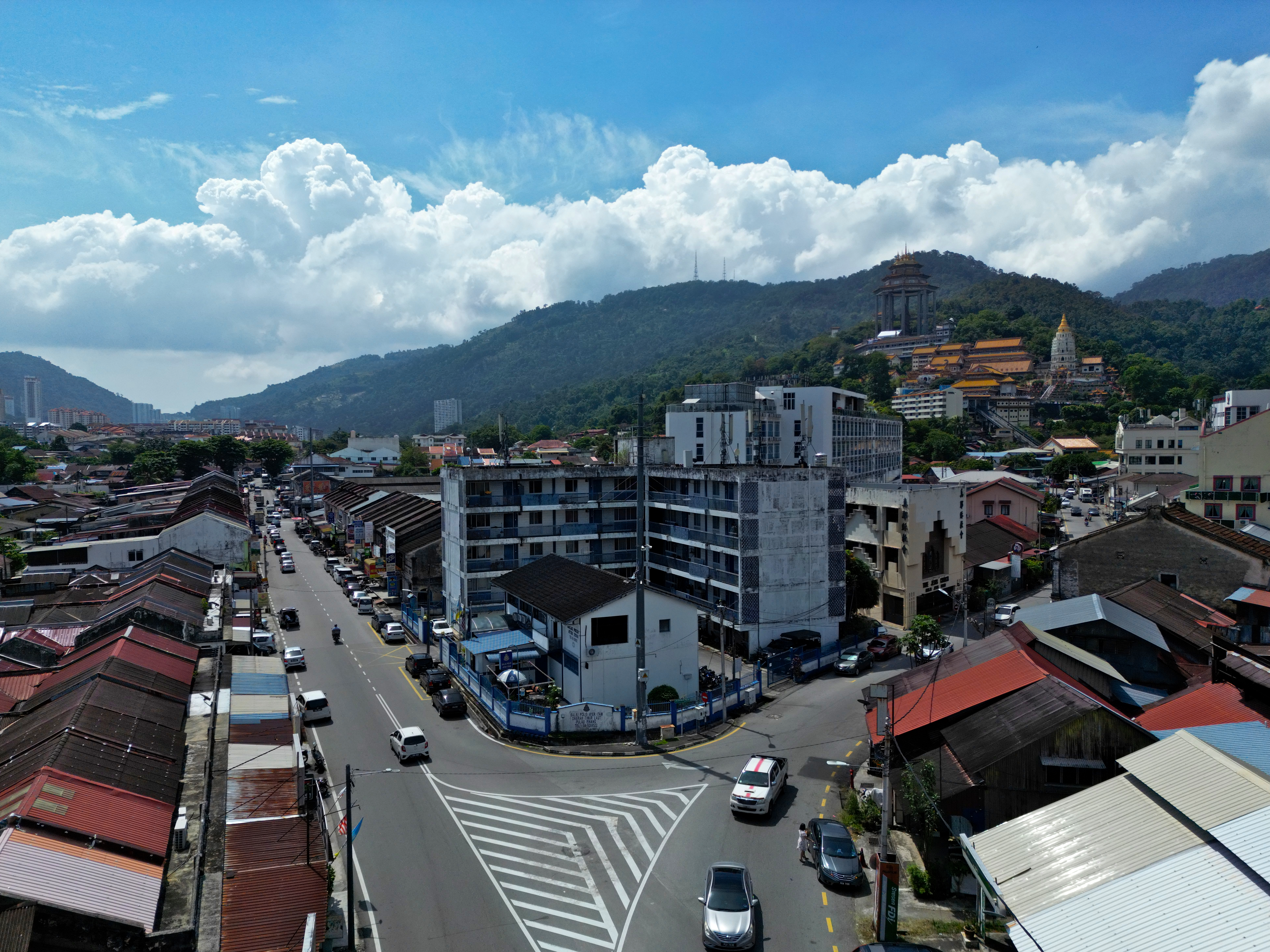
- Interactive map of Ayer Itam
- Location within George Town in Penang
- Coordinates: 5°24′5.6916″N 100°16′41.343″E
- Country: Malaysia
- State: Penang
- City: George Town
- District: Northeast

Area
  - Total: 1.8 km^{2} (0.69 sq mi)

Population (2020)
  - Total: 16,974
  - Density: 9,400/km^{2} (24,000/sq mi)

Demographics
  - Ethnic groups: 72.6% Chinese; 12.5% Bumiputera; 12.2% Malay; 0.3% indigenous groups from Sabah and Sarawak; 11.2% Indian; 0.3% Other ethnicities; 3.4% Non-citizens
- Time zone: UTC+8 (MST)
  - Summer (DST): Not observed
- Postal code: 11500

Ayer Itam (Note: Formerly spelt as Air Itam.) is a suburb of George Town in the Malaysian state of Penang. Nested within the central valleys of Penang Island, it is located approximately 6 km (3.7 mi) southwest of the city centre.

== Etymology ==
Ayer Itam got its name from the murky waters of the Ayer Itam River (Malay: Sungai Ayer Itam). The phrase Ayer Itam means black water in Malay. In 2019, state executive councillor Zairil Khir Johari announced the restoration of its gazetted name, Ayer Itam, from its former name Air Itam, as part of a state-wide standardisation of Malay names.

== History ==
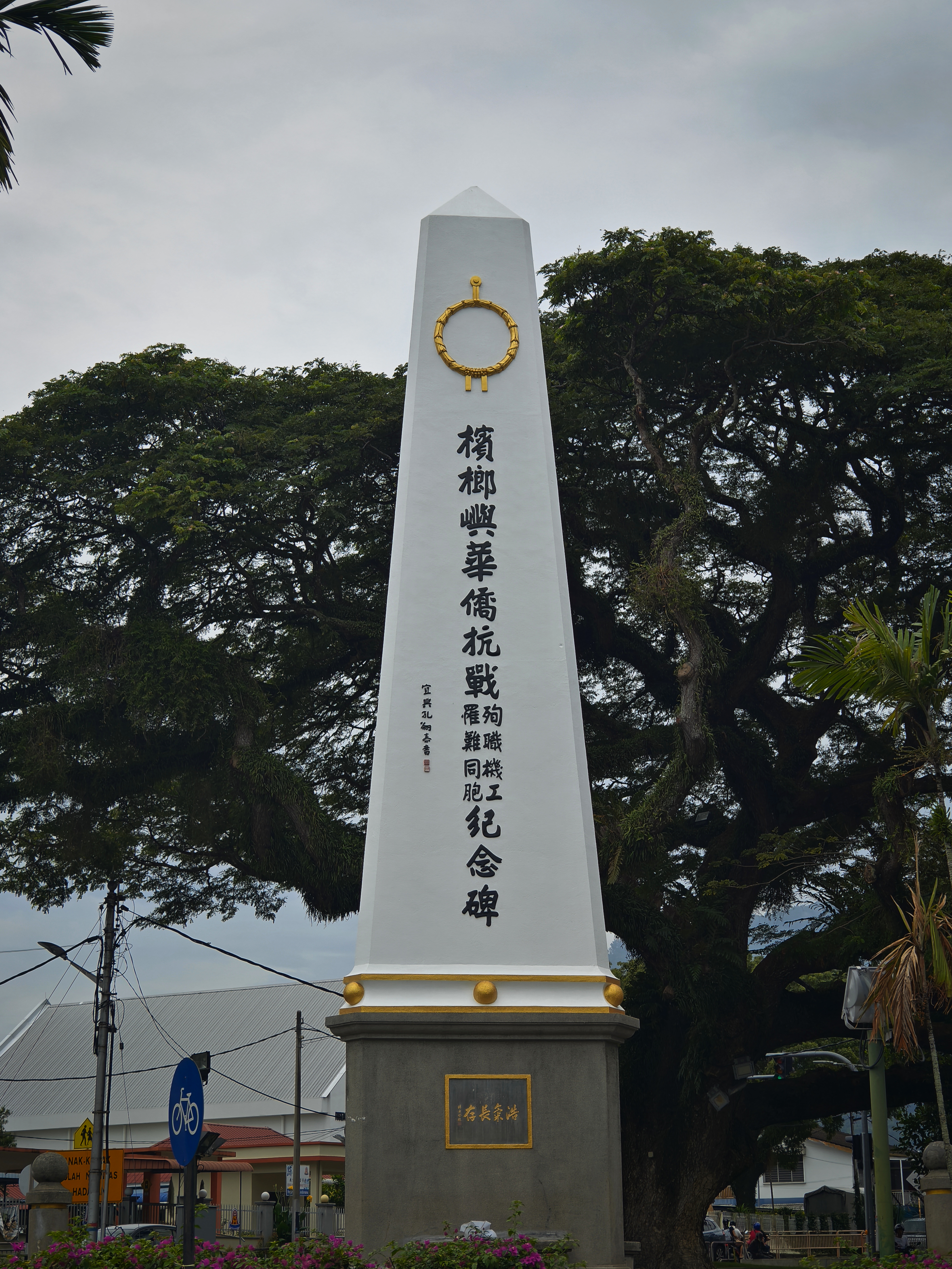
The War Memorial Park is where some 800 victims of the Sook Ching massacres during World War II were laid to rest.

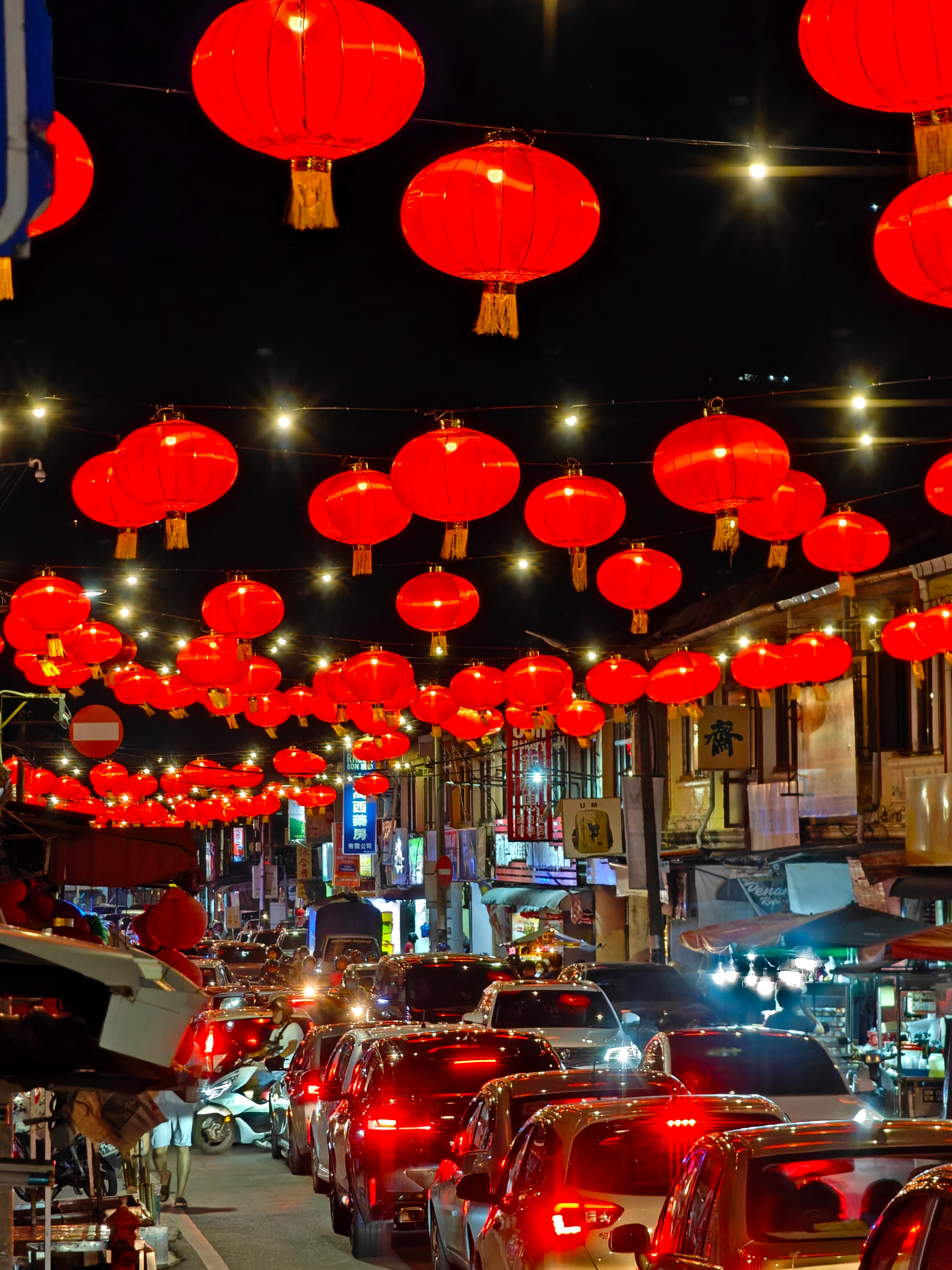
Lanterns adorning Ayer Itam Road during Chinese New Year

Soon after the founding of Penang Island in 1786, British East India Company officials, led by Captain Francis Light, began exploring and clearing the interior of the island for agricultural purposes. Pepper and nutmeg farms were then established at the hills of Ayer Itam, while Light also commissioned the planting of strawberries at Penang Hill. The Anglo-Indian Suffolk House, one of Light's residences, was also built within a pepper estate by the Air Itam River.

The agricultural village of Ayer Itam grew throughout the 19th century, populated by farmers who owned the fruit and vegetable farms at the surrounding hills. To this day, fresh produce are produced at the foothills of Ayer Itam and distributed daily to the wet markets all over the city.

Ayer Itam was once home to the Penang Zoological Gardens, the first zoo in Malaysia. Supposedly opened in the 1920s by a monk named Fa Kong, the zoo was shut down for good prior to World War II due to the excessive maintenance costs.

The Great Ayer Itam Fire of 1935 destroyed more than 100 homes in the area. At the time, the residences at Ayer Itam were mostly wooden; this incident led to the construction of brick buildings within the suburb.

The area was also a hinterland which hid refugees fleeing from the episodes of violence that had occasionally erupted in the city. For instance, the Penang Riots of 1867 forced some residents within the city centre to evacuate to Ayer Itam. World War II, however, brought even greater numbers of refugees to the suburb. During the war, when the Imperial Japanese Army implemented the Sook Ching purges, Ayer Itam became one of the sites where Chinese civilians were massacred.

The urbanisation of Ayer Itam since the 1950s has brought about a concurrent increase in living standards and transformed the landscape with more high rises, making the suburb one of the more densely populated areas in George Town.

== Geography ==
Located in the valley between Batu Lanchang Hill, Bukit Penara and Penang Hill, this suburb of George Town is connected to the city centre by two main roads, Ayer Itam Road and Batu Lanchang Lane. It is also connected to Paya Terubong and the south of the island via Paya Terubong Road. The suburb covers an area of 1.8 km^{2} (0.69 sq mi) and includes neighbourhoods developed later in the post-independence era such as Rifle Range.

While not situated within the official boundaries of Ayer Itam, certain landmarks such as Kek Lok Si and Ayer Itam Dam are commonly regarded as being located within the suburb.

Map of Ayer Itam.
Click link at the top right corner to zoom in.
1 Ayer Itam Market
2 Penang Hill Railway station
3 War Memorial Park
4 Rifle Range
5 Hye Keat Estate
6 Reservoir Garden
7 Kek Lok Si Charitable Hospital

== Demographics ==
Ethnicities within Ayer Itam in 2020
Ethnicities / Nationality	Percentage
Chinese	72.6%
Malays	12.2%
Other Bumiputeras	0.3%
Indians	11.2%
Others	0.3%
Non-Malaysians	3.4%

As of 2020, Ayer Itam was home to a population of 16,974, resulting in a population density of 9,430/km^{2} (24,400/sq mi). Ethnic Chinese constituted over 72% of the area's population, while Malays formed another 12%. Indians comprised more than 11% of the suburb's population.

== Transportation ==
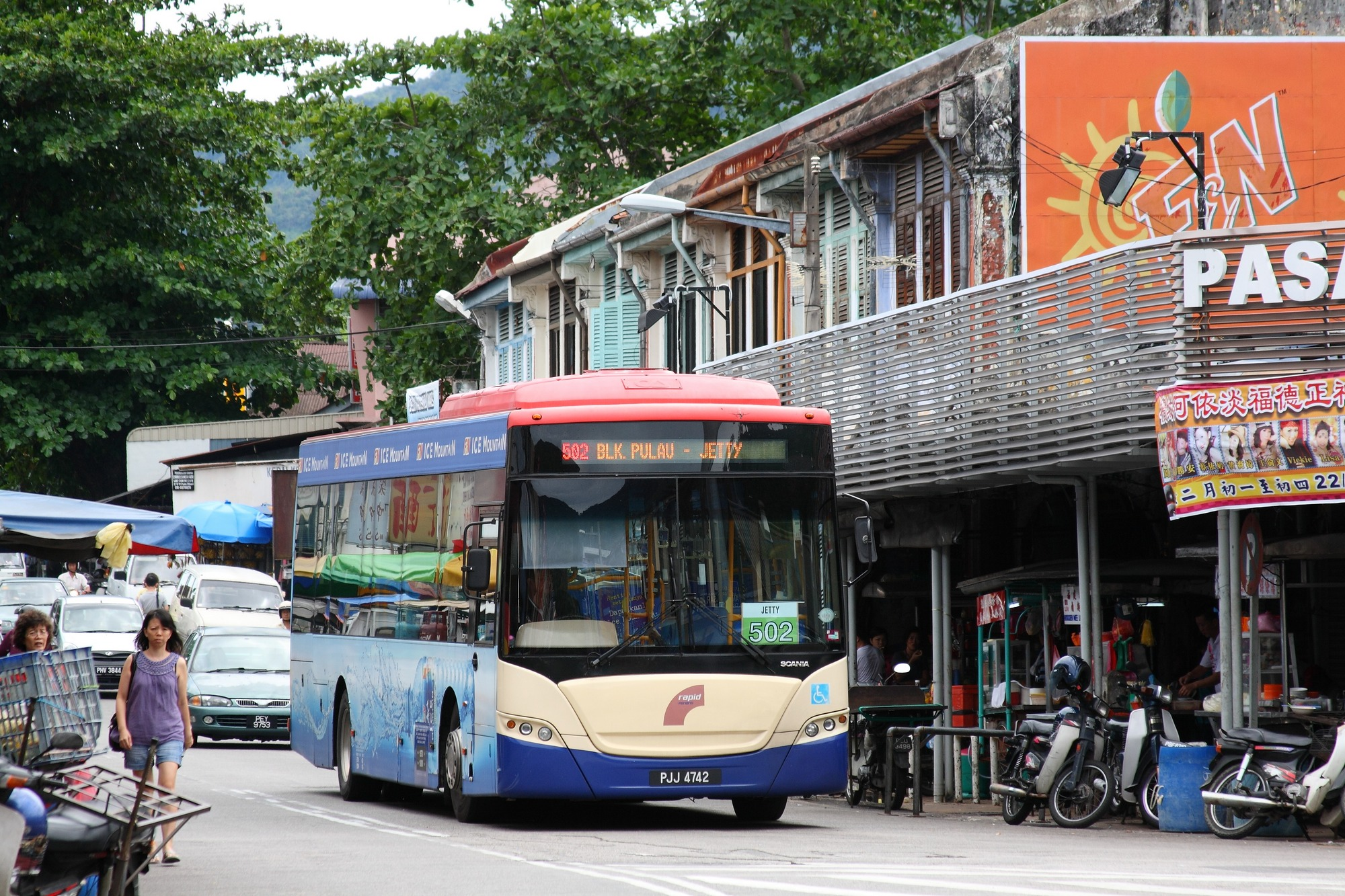
A Rapid Penang bus at the Ayer Itam Market

Ayer Itam Road serves as the main thoroughfare at Ayer Itam, with a total length of about 4.5 km (2.8 mi). Other major roads, such as Batu Lanchang Lane, Thean Teik Road and Thean Teik Highway, have been widened to cope with the increasing traffic.

Rapid Penang buses 13, 201, 202, 203, 204 and 502 serve the residents of the suburb, by connecting Ayer Itam with various destinations within the city, including the city centre, Paya Terubong, the Penang International Airport, Queensbay Mall and Balik Pulau.

== Education ==
Ayer Itam is served by two primary schools.

- SK Padang Tembak
- SJK (C) Kong Min Pusat
