= Queensbay Mall =

Shopping mall in George Town, Penang, Malaysia

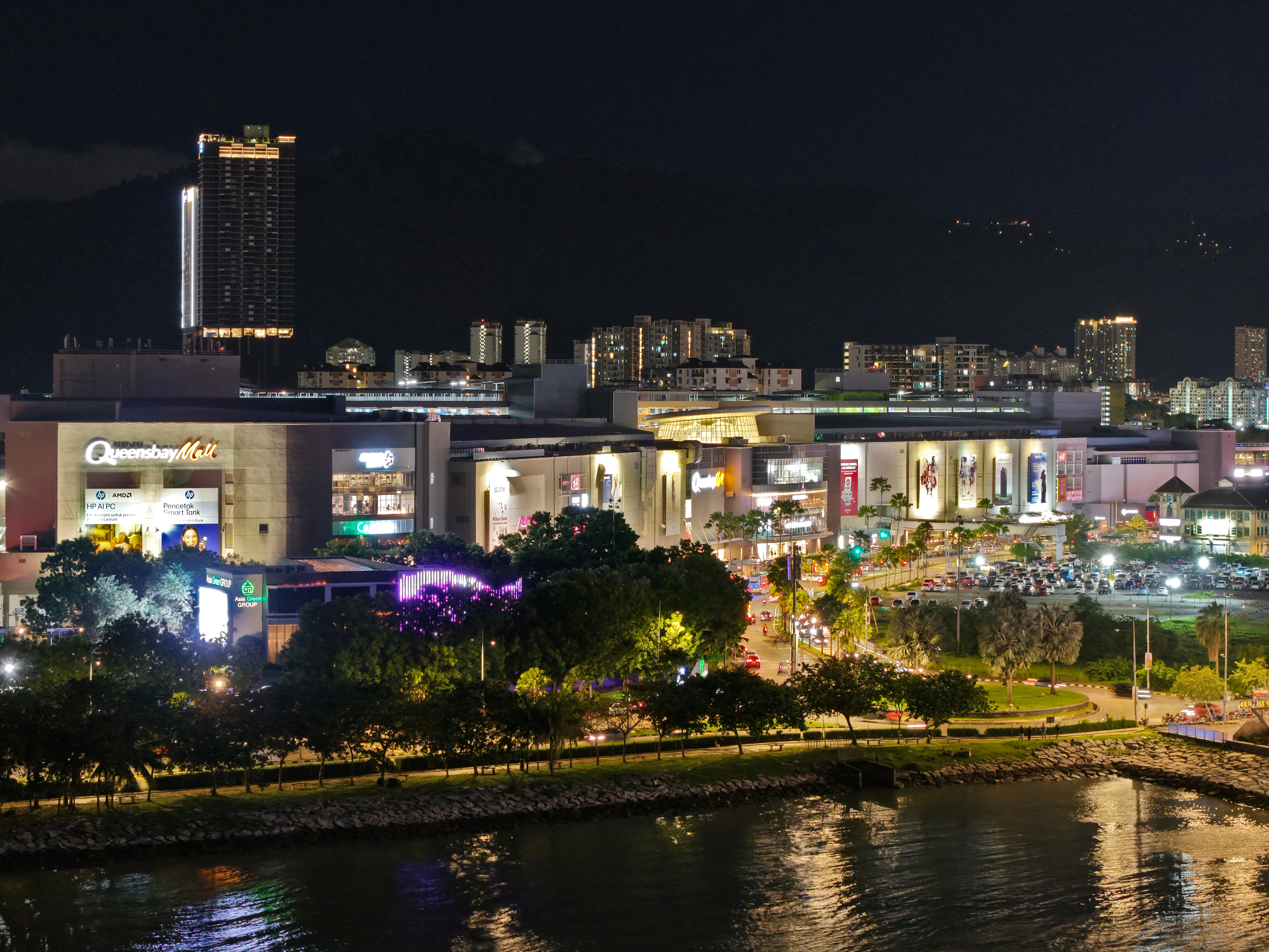
- External view of the shopping mall at night.
- Location: Queensbay Mall, 100, Persiaran Bayan Indah, 11900 Bayan Lepas, Pulau Pinang.
- Coordinates: 5.3346°N 100.3066°E
- Opened: 1 December 2006; 19 years ago
- Manager: CapitaLand Retail Malaysia
- Owner: CapitaLand Retail Malaysia
- Num. of stores: 400
- Num. of anchor tenants: 1 (AEON)
- Floor area: 883,111 sq ft (82,043.7 m^{2})
- Floors: 5
- Website: queensbaymallmalaysia.com

Queensbay Mall is a shopping mall within George Town in the Malaysian state of Penang. Located at the suburb of Bayan Lepas, the mall was opened to the public in 2006. It covers a gross built-up area of 2,500,000 ft^{2} (230,000 m^{2}) and contains over 400 shop lots spread out over five floors, attracting several established international brands. Its main anchor tenant is AEON and a Golden Screen Cinema complex is housed within its top floor. The mall has basement parking and multilevel parking lot for shoppers.

Since its opening in 2006, Queensbay Mall has become one of the major retail centres in Penang, competing directly against more established shopping malls within the state like Gurney Plaza. Notably, both Queensbay Mall and Gurney Plaza are managed by CapitaMalls Asia, a subsidiary of the Singapore-based CapitaLand.

The location of Queensbay Mall was previously an abandoned site of the Bayan Bay Mall Project. It was developed by Bayan Bay Development Sdn Bhd, a joint venture 70% owned by Anson Perdana Bhd and 30% by Penang Development Corporation. When Anson Perdana Bhd fell into financial distress in 1998 following the 1997 Asian financial crisis and became defunct, the project was only 60% completed. CP Group led by executive chairman Tan Chew Piau intervened in 2003 and revived the project in June 2005, which got its present name.

== Retail outlets ==
The mall consists of five storeys and 883,111 sq ft (82,043.7 m^{2}) of net lettable area, the second largest in George Town after Gurney Plaza.^{α} With over 400 shop lots, it has attracted numerous well-known international brands to set up outlets within. The brands in Queensbay Mall include the nation's famous book store Popular, fashion names such as Calvin Klein, Forever 21, Guess, Timberland, Giordano, Body Glove, Levi's, H&M, Lacoste, Uniqlo, and Padini, and the home furnishing brand Harvey Norman.

In addition, several restaurants, cafes and food stalls can be found inside Queensbay Mall, including Starbucks, The Coffee Bean & Tea Leaf, J.CO Donuts, Nando's, Haidilao, Häagen-Dazs, Mixue, Chagee and Tealive.

The main anchor tenant in Queensbay Mall is AEON, which runs a supermarket and apparel stores across the lower four floors.

== Entertainment ==
Queensbay Mall has a variety of entertainment options. The most well-known of all is the Golden Screen Cinemas at the top floor, with eight cineplexes. This is Golden Screen Cinemas' second flagship branch in Penang.

== Note ==
^αGurney Plaza has a nett lettable area of 889,859 sq ft (82,670.6 m^{2}).

== See also ==
- List of shopping malls in Malaysia
