= Malaysia Federal Route 6 =

Road in the Malaysian state of Penang

Federal Route 6

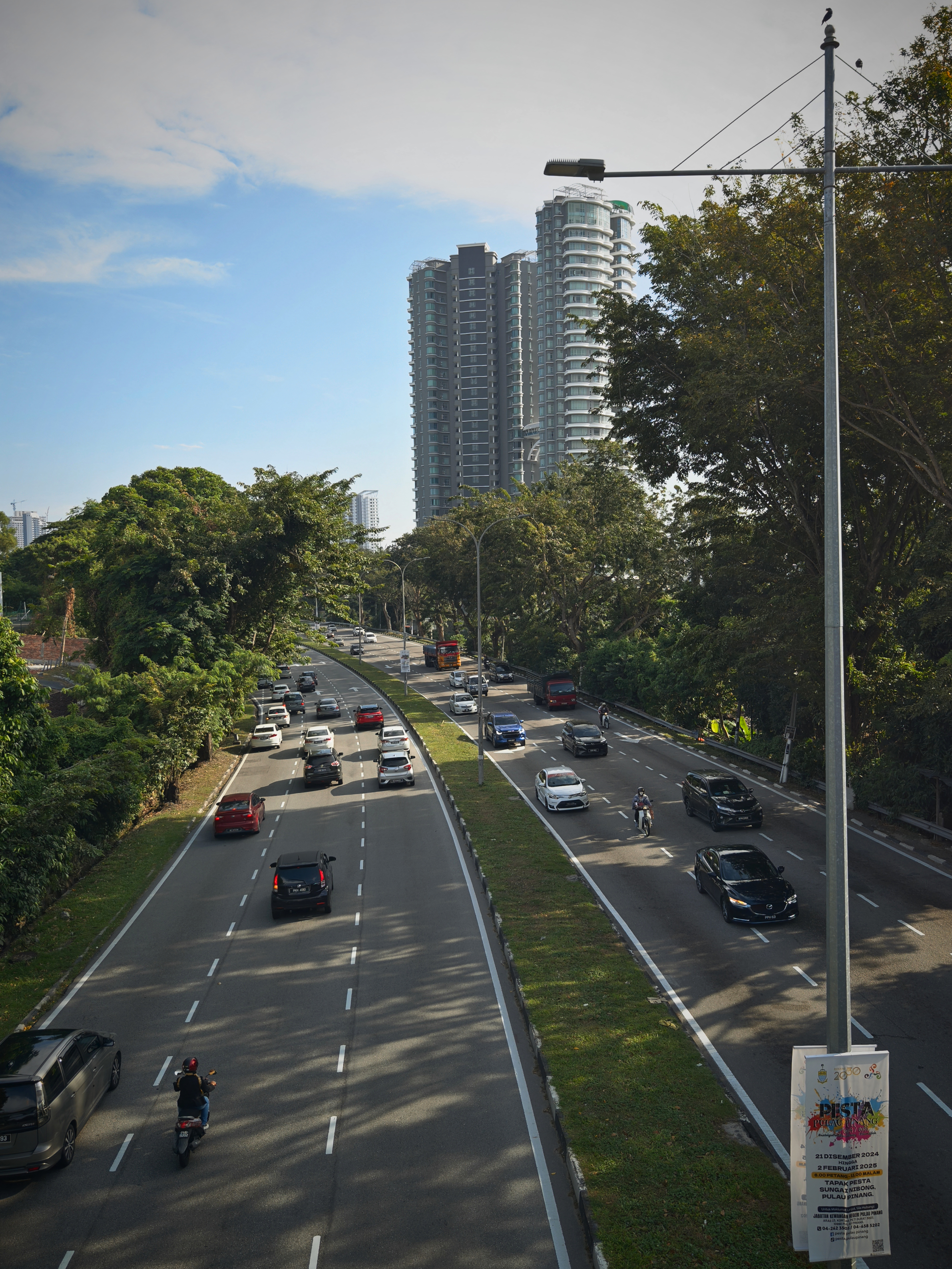

Route information
- Maintained by Malaysian Public Works Department
- Length: 62.33 km (38.73 mi)
- Existed: 1920s–present

Major junctions
- Beltway around George Town
- East end: Jelutong
- P19 Penang Middle Ring Road; Penang Bridge; FT 231 Jalan Tun Dr Awang; FT 3114 Lebuhraya Kampung Jawa; P10 Jalan Batu Maung
- West end: George Town on Tanjung Bungah

Location
- Country: Malaysia
- Primary destinations: Gelugor, Bayan Lepas, Penang International Airport, Balik Pulau, Batu Maung, Batu Feringghi

Highway system
- Highways in Malaysia; Expressways; Federal; State

Federal Route 6 is a federal road around Penang Island, Malaysia.

== Route background ==
The Federal Route 6 is the main circular trunk road that circles through the Penang Island. Its starting terminal (Kilometre Zero) and the ending terminal are located at the Penang Port Roundabout, George Town.

== History ==
The road was constructed by the British in the 1920s.

== Features ==
At most sections, the Federal Route 6 was built under the JKR R5 road standard, with a speed limit of 90 km/h (56 mph).

There are no overlaps, alternate routes, or sections with motorcycle lanes.

== Junction lists ==
The entire route is around Penang Island in Penang.

Legend:

- I/C - Interchange, I/S - Intersection, RSA - Rest and service area, OBR - Overhead bridge restaurant, R/R - Restaurant and rest plaza, L/B - Layby, V/P - Vista point, TN - tunnel, T/P - Toll plaza, BR - Bridge
- C - Cloverleaf, S - Stack, T-A - Trumpet-A, T-B - Trumpet-B, DT - Directional-T/Y, SDT - Semi-Directional-T/Y, P-Y - Partial-Y, D - Diamond, P-C - Partial cloverleaf, D-D - Diverging diamond, D-R - Direct ramp

District	Km	Exit	Name	Destinations	Notes
Northeast			Georgetown; Brick Klin	Jalan Brick Klin – City centre, KOMTAR Penang; Jalan C Y Choy – Lebuh Pantai (Beach Street)	Junctions
Northeast		BR	Sungai Pinang bridge		
Northeast			Jalan Sungai Pinang	Jalan Sungai Pinang – Taman Abidin, P. Ramlee birthplace	T-junctions
Northeast			Jelutong	Jalan Perak – Taman Abidin; Jalan Tan Sri Teh Ewe Lim (Jalan Batu Lanchang) – Jelutong; Jalan Pokok Asam; FT 3113 Tun Dr Lim Chong Eu Expressway – City centre, Bayan Lepas	Junctions
Northeast			Gelugor	P19 Penang Middle Ring Road – Air Itam, Jalan Masjid Negeri; FT 3113 Tun Dr Lim Chong Eu Expressway – Bayan Lepas; Penang Bridge – Butterworth, Alor Star, Ipoh, Kuala Lumpur	Stacked roundabout interchange
Northeast			Maktab Perguruan Persekutuan Gelugor	Maktab Perguruan Persekutuan Gelugor	
Northeast			Gelugor-PORR	Penang Outer Ring Road	Under planning
Northeast			RECSAM	RECSAM	
Northeast			Bandar Gelugor		
Northeast			Taman Tun Sardon	Taman Tun Sardon	T-junctions
Northeast			Kampung Sungai Gelugor	Kampung Sungai Gelugor	
Northeast			Minden Heights	Minden Heights	
Northeast			Penang Fest expo site	Penang Fest expo site	
Northeast			Universiti Sains Malaysia	Universiti Sains Malaysia	T-junctions
Northeast			Penang Bridge	Penang Bridge – Butterworth, Alor Star, Ipoh, Kuala Lumpur	Interchange
Northeast			Jalan Sungai Dua	P15 Jalan Sungai Dua – Bukit Jambul	Junctions
Northeast			Lorong Sungai Dua	P214 Lorong Sungai Dua – Bukit Jambul	T-junctions
Northeast			Sungai Nibong	P15 Jalan Sungai Dua – Bukit Jambul; P218 Jalan Aziz Ibrahim – Batu Uban	Junctions
Northeast			Bayan Baru Roundabout	FT 231 Jalan Tun Dr Awang – Sungai Ara, Bukit Jambul, Paya Terubong; FT 3113 Tun Dr Lim Chong Eu Expressway – George Town; Penang Bridge – Butterworth, Alor Setar; Sultan Abdul Halim Muadzam Shah Bridge – Bandar Cassia, Batu Kawan, Nibong Tebal, Ipoh, Kuala Lumpur	Roundabout interchange
Northeast			Jalan Mahsuri	Jalan Mahsuri – Taman Bayan Baru; Jalan Kampung Jawa – Kampung Jawa	Junctions
Northeast			Kampung Jawa Expressway	FT 3114 Lebuhraya Kampung Jawa – Kampung Jawa	T-junctions
Northeast			Jalan Tengah	P8 Jalan Tengah – Sungai Ara	T-junctions
Southwest			Bayan Lepas Roundabout	FT 281 Jalan Tun Dr Awang – Sungai Ara, Bukit Jambul, Paya Terubong, Penang International Airport Arrival/Departure	Raindrop roundabout interchange
Southwest			Bayan Lepas	P10 Jalan Batu Maung – Batu Maung, Teluk Tempoyak; Sultan Abdul Halim Muadzam Shah Bridge – Bandar Cassia, Batu Kawan, Nibong Tebal, Ipoh, Kuala Lumpur	T-junctions
Southwest			Kampung Sungai Batu		
Southwest			Teluk Kumbar		
Southwest			Teluk Kumbar	P224 Jalan Gertak Sanggul – Gertak Sanggul, Fishing village	T-junctions
Southwest			Penara		
Southwest			Pekan Genting	P16 Jalan Balik Pulau Barat – Kampung Perlis, Kampung Bakar Kapur, Kuala Jalan Bahru	T-junctions
Southwest			Kampung Kuala Muda		
Southwest			Balik Pulau		
Southwest			Balik Pulau	P14 Jalan Tun Sardon – Paya Terubong, Air Itam, Kek Lok Si Temple	Roundabout
Southwest			Balik Pulau Hospital	Hospital Balik Pulau	
Southwest			Balik Pulau		
Southwest			Spice Garden		
Southwest			Titi Peropok	P16 Jalan Balik Pulau Barat – Kampung Perlis, Kampung Bakar Kapur, Kuala Johor Bahru	T-junctions
Southwest			Jalan Permatang Pasir	P234 Jalan Permatang Pasir – Permatang Pasir	T-junctions
Southwest			Sungai Rusa		
Southwest			Jalan Kuala Sungai Pinang	P236 Jalan Kuala Sungai Pinang – Kuala Sungai Pinang	T-junctions
Southwest			Sungai Pinang		
Southwest			Jalan Pantai Aceh	P243 Jalan Pantai Aceh – Pantai Aceh	T-junctions
Southwest			Clove and Nutmag Orchards		
Southwest			Titi Kerawang	Titi Kerawang Waterfall –	
Southwest			Durian Orchards		
Southwest			Tropical Fruit Farm	V	
Southwest			Forest Recreation Park and Museum		
Southwest			Entopia by Penang Butterfly Farm		
Southwest			Teluk Bahang Dam		
Southwest			Teluk Bahang Forest Eco Park	Teluk Bahang Forest Eco Park –	
Southwest			Batik Factory		
Southwest			Teluk Bahang	P244 Jalan Teluk Awak – Kampung Teluk Awak; P247 Jalan Hassan Abas – Fishing village	Roundabout
Southwest			Kampung Keling		
Southwest			Cultural Centre		
Southwest			Tropical Spice Garden	Tropical Spice Garden – V	
Northeast			Batu Ferringhi	Batu Ferringhi Beach – V	
Northeast			Tanjung Bungah	P4 Jalan Mount Erskine (Mount Erskine Road) – Mount Erskine	T-junctions
Northeast			Tanjung Tokong		
Northeast			Jalan Mount Erskine	P4 Jalan Mount Erskine (Mount Erskine Road) – Mount Erskine	T-junctions
Northeast			Bagan Jermal		
Northeast			George Town		
