= Malaysia Federal Route 281 =

Road in the Malaysian state of Penang

Federal Route 281
- Jalan Tun Dr Awang

Route information
- Maintained by Malaysian Public Works Department
- Length: 5.56 km (3.45 mi)

Major junctions
- Northeast end: Sungai Nibong interchange FT 3113 Tun Dr Lim Chong Eu Expressway
- FT 3113 Tun Dr Lim Chong Eu Expressway; FT 6 Gelugor Highway; FT 220 Jalan Dato Ismail Hashim
- South end: Penang International Airport

Location
- Country: Malaysia
- Primary destinations: Sungai Nibong, Bukit Jambul, Relau, Sungai Ara, Bayan Lepas

Highway system
- Highways in Malaysia; Expressways; Federal; State

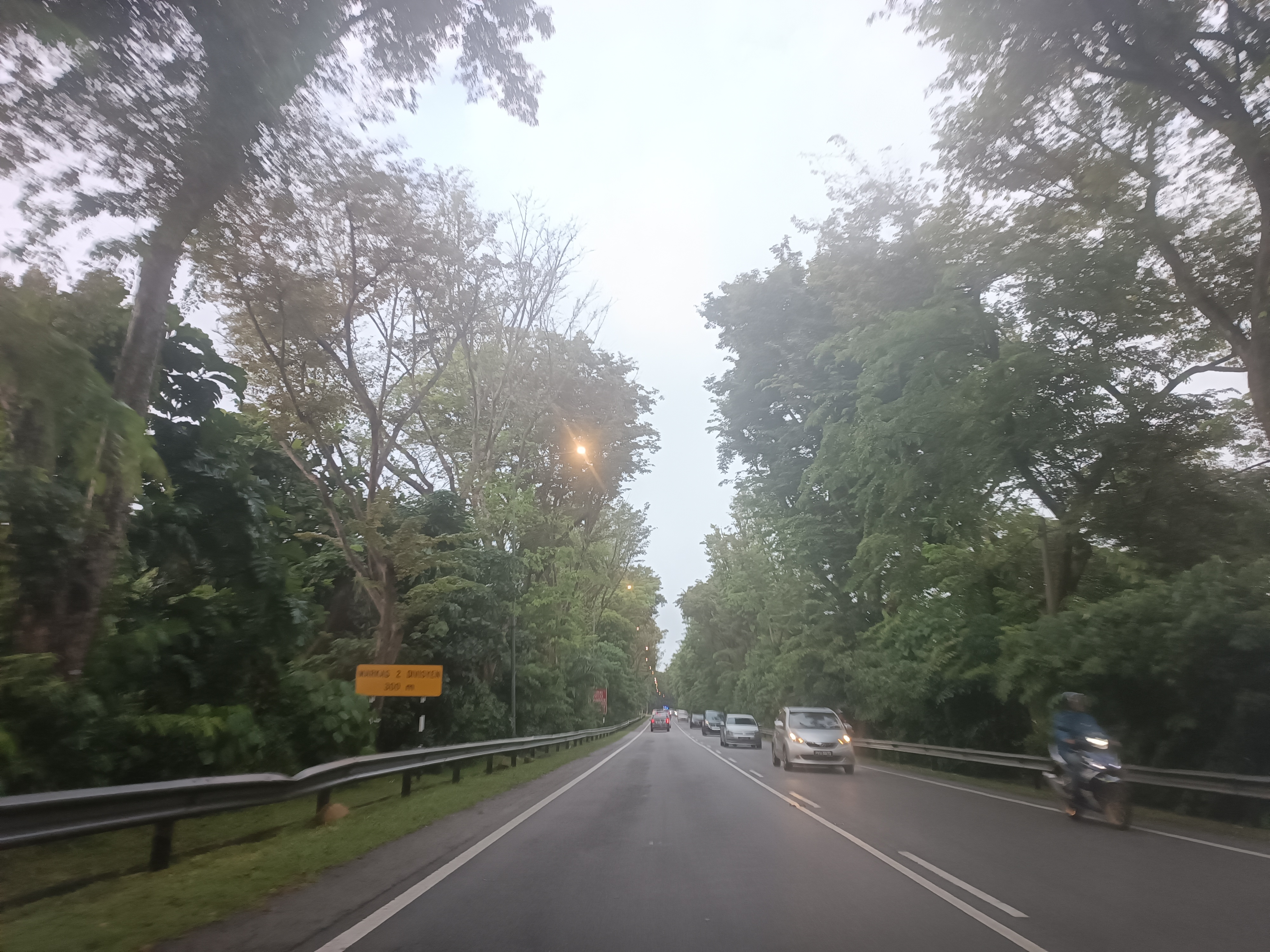
Jalan Tun Dr Awang

Jalan Tun Dr Awang, Federal Route 281 is a major highway in Penang, Malaysia. It was named after Tun Dr Awang Hassan, the former Yang di-Pertua Negeri (Governor) of Penang.

== Route background ==
The Kilometre Zero is located at Bulatan Bayan Lepas roundabout in Bayan Lepas.

At most sections, it was built under the JKR R5 road standard, allowing maximum speed limit of up to 90 km/h.

== Junction lists ==
The entire route is located in Penang.

Legend:

- I/C - Interchange, I/S - Intersection, RSA - Rest and service area, OBR - Overhead bridge restaurant, R/R - Restaurant and rest plaza, L/B - Layby, V/P - Vista point, TN - tunnel, T/P - Toll plaza, BR - Bridge
- C - Cloverleaf, S - Stack, T-A - Trumpet-A, T-B - Trumpet-B, DT - Directional-T/Y, SDT - Semi-Directional-T/Y, P-Y - Partial-Y, D - Diamond, P-C - Partial cloverleaf, D-D - Diverging diamond, D-R - Direct ramp

District	Location	km	mi	Exit	Name	Destinations	Notes
Northeast	Sungai Nibong	5.56	3.45	1	Sungai Nibong; Sungai Nibong I/C	FT 3113 Tun Dr Lim Chong Eu Expressway – George Town, Jelutong, Batu Maung, Bayan Lepas Industrial Area; Penang Bridge – Butterworth, Alor Setar; Sultan Abdul Halim Muadzam Shah Bridge – Bandar Cassia, Batu Kawan, Nibong Tebal, Ipoh, Kuala Lumpur	Directional-T Interchange
Northeast	Sungai Nibong			2	Bayan Baru Roundabout	FT 6 Gelugor Highway – George Town, Jelutong, Gelugor, Bayan Lepas, Penang International Airport	Roundabout interchange
Northeast	Bukit Jambul			3	Kampung Seberang Paya I/S	Jalan Bukit Gambier	T-junctions
Northeast	Bukit Jambul				Bukit Jambul		
Northeast	Relau			4	Relau; Relau I/S	FT 220 Malaysia Federal Route 220 – Paya Terubong, Air Itam	T-junctions
Northeast	Relau				Setia SPICE		
Northeast	Relau			5	Jalan Mahsuri I/S	Jalan Mahsuri – Kampung Bayan Baru, Penang Development Corporation (PDC) main headquarters	T-junctions
Northeast	Sungai Ara				Kampung Pulau Tengah		
Northeast	Sungai Ara			6	Sungai Ara; Sungai Ara I/S	P8 Jalan Tengah	Junctions
Southwest	Bayan Lepas				Kampung Tersusun Sungai Ara		
Southwest	Bayan Lepas				Taman Gedung Heights		
Southwest	Bayan Lepas				Bayan Lepas		
Southwest	Bayan Lepas				Kampung Bukit Ayun		
Southwest	Bayan Lepas				Taman Seri Bayan		
Southwest	Bayan Lepas	0.0	0.0	7	Bayan Lepas Roundabout	FT 6 Gelugor Highway – Batu Maung, Penara, Balik Pulau, Gelugor, Jelutong, George Town	Roundabout interchange
Southwest	PIA				Malaysia Airports Training Centre		
Southwest	PIA				Penang International Airport	Penang International Airport – Arrival/Departure	
1.000 mi = 1.609 km; 1.000 km = 0.621 mi
