= Batu Uban =

- Neighbourhood
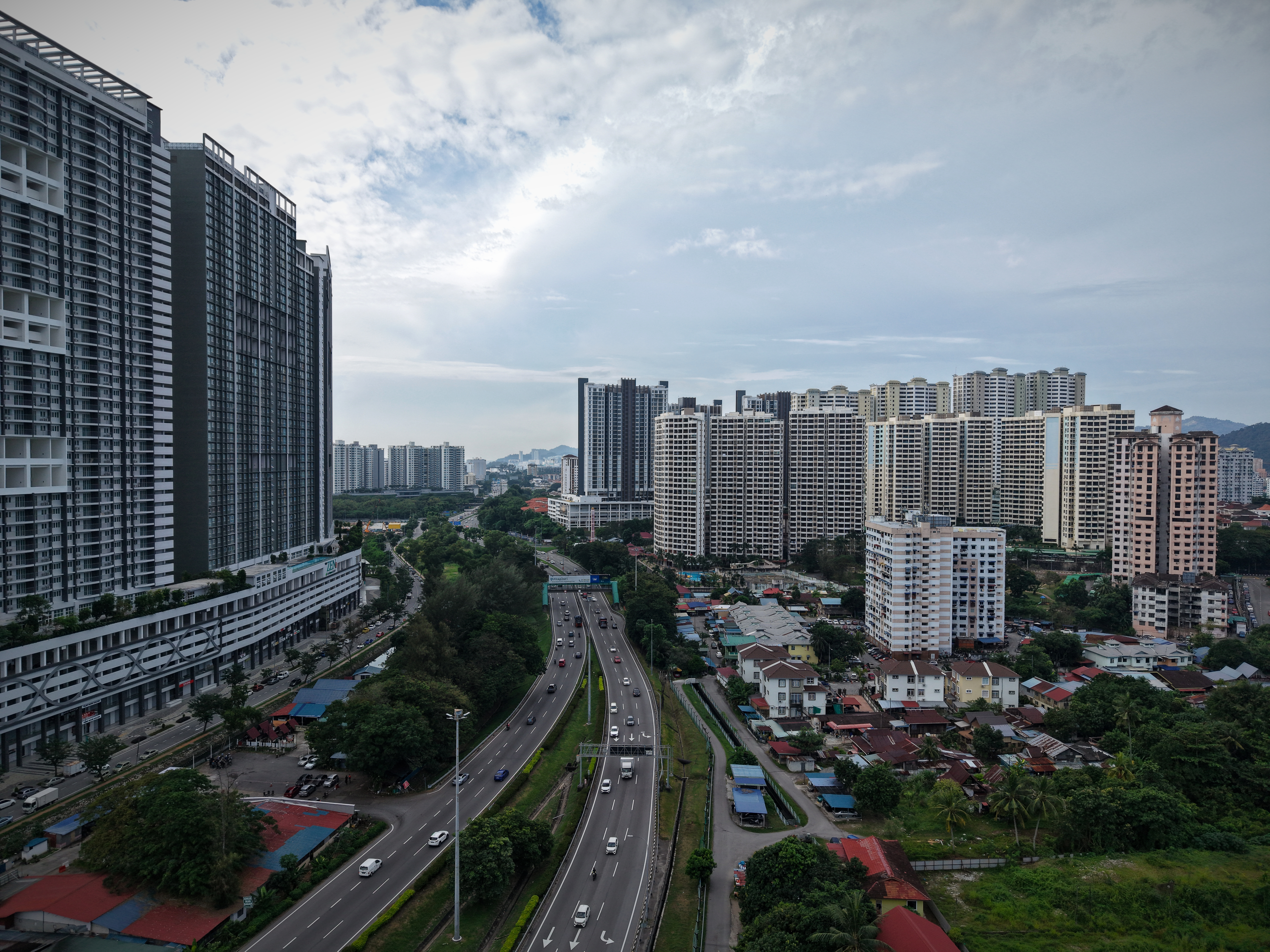
- Interactive map of Batu Uban
- Location within George Town in Penang
- Coordinates: 5°21′25.5522″N 100°18′37.5906″E
- Country: Malaysia
- State: Penang
- City: George Town
- District: Northeast
- Time zone: UTC+8 (MST)
  - Summer (DST): Not observed
- Postal code: 11700

Batu Uban is a residential neighbourhood within the city of George Town in the Malaysian state of Penang, about 6.7 km (4.2 mi) south of the city centre. Founded by ethnic Minangkabaus in the early 18th century, Batu Uban is regarded as the oldest Malay settlement on Penang Island.

Since the late 20th century, Batu Uban has been significantly urbanised, with residential high-rises now dotting the neighbourhood.

== Etymology ==
Batu Uban means grey hair rock in Malay. The area was said to have been named after a sea boulder, which was covered in dried grass, off the coast of what is now Batu Uban; this grassy rock resembled white hair from afar.

== History ==
The establishment of Batu Uban is credited to two ethnic Minangkabaus from Sumatra – Haji Muhammad Salleh (also known as Nakhoda intan) and Jenaton Raha Labu. In 1734, Haji Muhammad Salleh and his followers landed at the area and built a mosque named Masjid Jamek; this also makes the mosque the oldest in Penang. The fishing village they founded was also centred around the mosque.

In 1749, Dato' Jenaton Raja Labu from Pagarruyung was granted a 100-acre (40 ha) site at Batu Uban by the Sultan of Kedah, as a reward for his assistance in thwarting a Siamese invasion of Kedah; Penang Island was part of Kedah at the time. Jenaton and about 90 followers then travelled to Batu Uban, and cultivated the land into coconut and sugar cane plantations. Jenaton was also said to have contributed to the propagation of Islam within this new settlement.

The founding of Batu Uban between 1734 and 1749 by the Minangkabaus makes it the oldest Malay settlement on Penang Island, predating Captain Francis Light's arrival on the island in 1786. However, it was only in the late 20th century when Batu Uban began to witness significant development. The completion of the Penang Bridge immediately north of Batu Uban in the 1980s and subsequently, the Tun Dr Lim Chong Eu Expressway along the coast of Batu Uban, heralded the development of Batu Uban as an affluent residential neighbourhood.

== Transportation ==
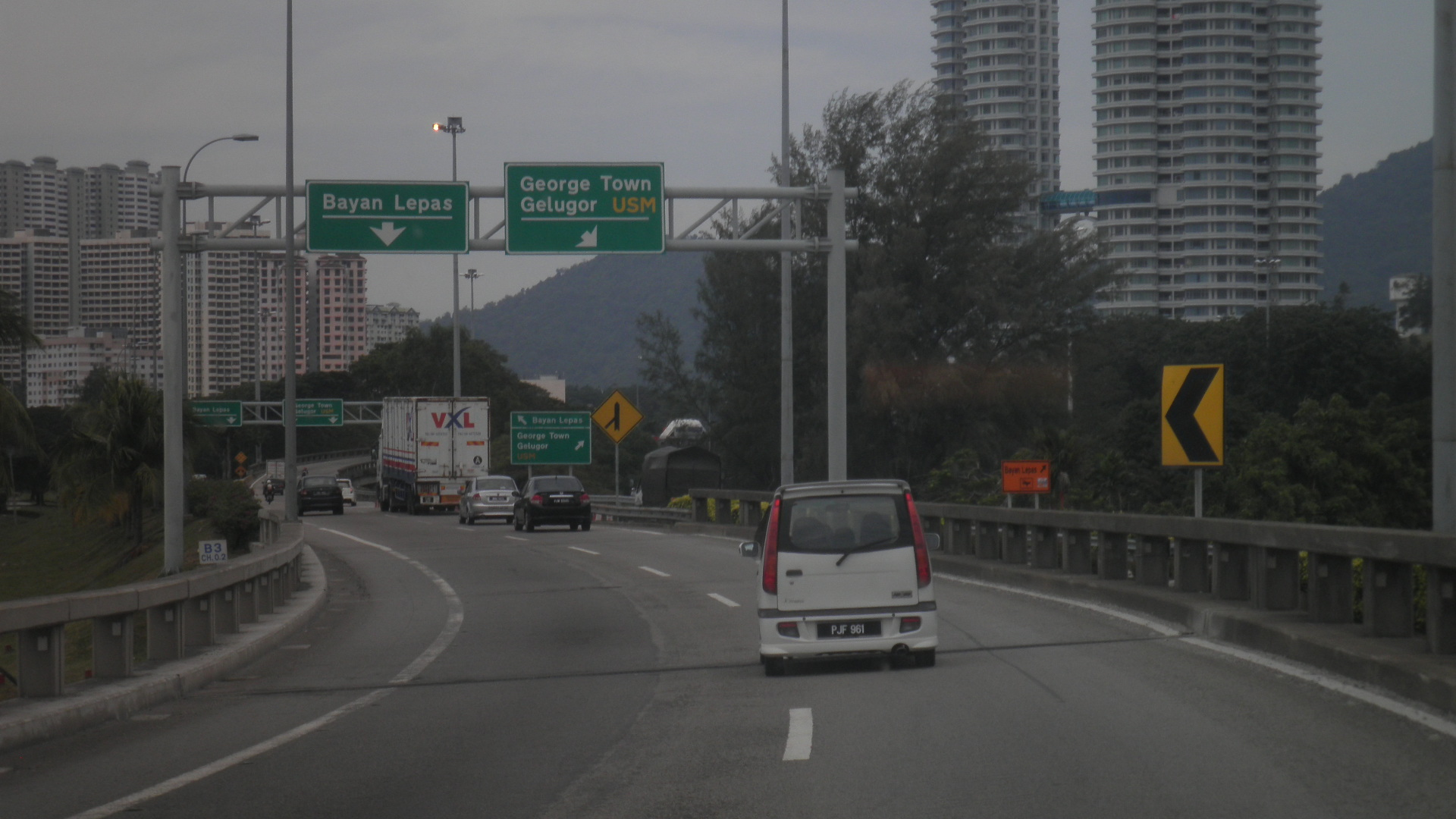
The Penang Bridge exit bypass within Batu Uban

Rapid Penang bus routes 301, 302, 303 and 304 include stops along Jalan Sultan Azlan Shah, which forms the western limits of the Batu Uban neighbourhood. These routes link Batu Uban with the city centre to the north and various other destinations such as Bukit Jambul, Bayan Baru, Bayan Lepas and Batu Maung.

In addition, Batu Uban, situated immediately south of the cross-strait Penang Bridge, is easily accessible for motorists from the mainland Malay Peninsula as well.

== Education ==
Penang Island's sole public university, Universiti Sains Malaysia, is located immediately northwest of the Batu Uban neighbourhood. The university was ranked fifth within Malaysia by the QS World University Rankings as of 2016.
