= Penang Outer Ring Road =

Proposed expressway in Selangor, Malaysia

Route information
- Maintained by Peninsular Metroworks Sdn Bhd (PMW)
- Length: 17 km (11 mi)
- Existed: 1996–present
- History: -

Major junctions
- From: Tanjung Tokong
- FT 6 Gelugor Highway; FT 3113 Tun Dr Lim Chong Eu Expressway; Penang Bridge
- To: Gelugor Timur

Location
- Country: Malaysia
- Major cities: George Town, Air Itam, Gelugor

Highway system
- Highways in Malaysia; Expressways; Federal; State

Penang Outer Ring Road (PORR) is a planned expressway in George Town, Penang, Malaysia. If constructed, it will connect Gelugor in the south, near Penang Bridge to Tanjung Bungah in the north. After a mid-term review of the Ninth Malaysia Plan, this project, together with Penang Monorail has been postponed indefinitely.

== History ==
The concession was awarded to Peninsular Metroworks Sdn Bhd (PMW), a company formed in 1996 but the company was not able to get the project off the ground. PMW was formed by Nadi Senandung Sdn Bhd (55%), Yayasan Bumiputera Pulau Pinang Bhd (35%) and an individual. It was reported in early May 2007 that Malaysian Resources Corporation Berhad (MRCB) will become the lead shareholder of the company and will start the construction of the road.

About 60 percent of the 17 km highway will be elevated. Development cost is expected to be RM1.02 billion.

== Interchange lists ==
The entire route is located in Northeast District, Penang.

Legend:

- I/C - Interchange, I/S - Intersection, RSA - Rest and service area, OBR - Overhead bridge restaurant, R/R - Restaurant and rest plaza, L/B - Layby, V/P - Vista point, TN - tunnel, T/P - Toll plaza, BR - Bridge
- C - Cloverleaf, S - Stack, T-A - Trumpet-A, T-B - Trumpet-B, DT - Directional-T/Y, SDT - Semi-Directional-T/Y, P-Y - Partial-Y, D - Diamond, P-C - Partial cloverleaf, D-D - Diverging diamond, D-R - Direct ramp

=== Main link ===
Location	km	mi	Exit	Name	Destinations	Notes
Gelugor				Gelugor East	FT 3113 Tun Dr Lim Chong Eu Expressway – Bayan Lepas, Penang International Airport, Batu Muang; Penang Bridge – Butterworth, Bukit Kayu Hitam, Alor Setar, Ipoh, Kuala Lumpur	Interchange
Gelugor				Gelugor	FT 6 Malaysia Federal Route 6 – Bayan Lepas, Penang International Airport, Universiti Sains Malaysia; Penang Bridge – Butterworth, Bukit Kayu Hitam, Alor Setar, Ipoh, Kuala Lumpur	Interchange
Gelugor				Air Hitam I/C	FT 220 Malaysia Federal Route 220	Interchange
Gelugor			Air Itam Toll Plaza			
George Town				Utama	P-- Jalan Jesselton – City centere	Interchange
George Town			Pulau Tikus Toll Plaza			
George Town				Pulau Tikus	Penang Botanic Gardens	Interchange
George Town				Persiaran Gurney (Gurney Drive)	Gunrey Link – Tanjung Bungah, Batu Feringghi, City centre	Interchange
1.000 mi = 1.609 km; 1.000 km = 0.621 mi: Electronic toll collection

=== Gurney link ===
Location	km	mi	Exit	Name	Destinations	Notes
George Town				Tanjong Bungah	FT 6 Malaysia Federal Route 6 – Batu Feringghi, Teluk Bahang, Tanjung Tokong	Interchange
George Town			Tanjung Tokong Toll Plaza			
George Town				Persiaran Gurney (Gurney Drive)	Main Link – Air Itam, Gelugor, Bayan Lepas, Butterworth	Interchange
George Town			Gurney Toll Plaza			
George Town				Persiaran Gurney Selatan (Gurney Drive South)	Jalan Kelawei (Kelawei Road); Jalan Sutlan Ahmad Shah (Northam Road) – City centre	Interchange
1.000 mi = 1.609 km; 1.000 km = 0.621 mi: Electronic toll collection
