= Malaysia Federal Route 3114 =

Road in the Malaysian state of Penang

Federal Route 3114
- Lebuhraya Kampung Jawa (Kampong Java Avenue)

Route information
- Maintained by Malaysian Public Works Department
- Length: 1.58 km (0.98 mi)

Major junctions
- West end: FT 6 Gelugor Highway
- FT 6 Gelugor Highway; FT 3113 Tun Dr Lim Chong Eu Expressway
- East end: FT 3113 Tun Dr Lim Chong Eu Expressway

Location
- Country: Malaysia
- Primary destinations: Kampung Jawa

Highway system
- Highways in Malaysia; Expressways; Federal; State

Lebuhraya Kampung Jawa, or Kampong Java Avenue, Federal Route 3114 (formerly Penang state route P17), is an industrial federal road in Penang, Malaysia.

At most sections, the Federal Route 3114 was built under the JKR R5 road standard, with a speed limit of 90 km/h.

== List of junctions ==
| Km | Exit | Junctions | To | Remarks |
|---|---|---|---|---|
| | | Gelugor Highway | FT 6 Gelugor Highway North; George Town; Gelugor South; Bayan Lepas; Penang International Airport | T-junctions |
| | | Lintang Kampung Jawa | | |
| | | Mardec Polimer | | |
| | | Lengkok Kampung Jawa | | |
| | | Hala Kampung Jawa 1 | | |
| | | Hala Kampung Jawa 2 | | |
| | | Bayan Lepas Expressway | FT 3113 Tun Dr Lim Chong Eu Expressway North; George Town; Penang Bridge Penang Bridge; Butterworth; Alor Setar South; Batu Maung; Bayan Lepas; Sultan Abdul Halim Muadzam Shah Bridge Penang Second Bridge; Batu Kawan; Ipoh; Kuala Lumpur | T-junctions |
