= Penang State Route P243 =

Road in the Malaysian state of Penang

Penang Route 243
- Jalan Pantai Aceh

Major junctions
- North end: Sungai Pinang
- FT 6 Federal route 6
- South end: Pantai Acheh

Location
- Country: Malaysia
- Primary destinations: Kampung Batu Kecil; Kampung Batu Puteh

Highway system
- Highways in Malaysia; Expressways; Federal; State

Jalan Pantai Aceh (Penang state road P243) is a major road in Penang, Malaysia.

== List of junctions ==
Km	Exit	Junctions	To	Remarks
		Sungai Pinang	North; FT 6 Batu Maung; FT 6 Batu Ferringhi; FT 6 George Town South; FT 6 Balik Pulau; FT 6 Bayan Lepas	T-junctions
		Kampung Batu Kecil		
		Kampung Batu Putih		
		Sheikh Tahir Jalaluddin Falak Observatory		
		Pantai Acheh		
