= Penang State Route P10 =

Road in the Malaysian state of Penang

Penang Route 10
- Jalan Batu Maung

Major junctions
- West end: Bayan Lepas
- FT 6 Federal Route 6 P222 Jalan Teluk Tempoyak; FT 3113 Tun Dr Lim Chong Eu Expressway
- East end: Batu Maung

Location
- Country: Malaysia
- Primary destinations: Kampung Seronok

Highway system
- Highways in Malaysia; Expressways; Federal; State

Penang State Route P10, Jalan Batu Maung also known as Jalan Permatang Damar Laut is a major road in Penang, Malaysia. It connects Bayan Lepas to Batu Maung near Penang Aquarium.

== Junction lists ==
The entire route is located in Southwest District, Penang.

Legend:

- I/C - Interchange, I/S - Intersection, RSA - Rest and service area, OBR - Overhead bridge restaurant, R/R - Restaurant and rest plaza, L/B - Layby, V/P - Vista point, TN - tunnel, T/P - Toll plaza, BR - Bridge
- C - Cloverleaf, S - Stack, T-A - Trumpet-A, T-B - Trumpet-B, DT - Directional-T/Y, SDT - Semi-Directional-T/Y, P-Y - Partial-Y, D - Diamond, P-C - Partial cloverleaf, D-D - Diverging diamond, D-R - Direct ramp

Location	km	mi	Name	Destinations	Notes
Bayan Lepas			Bayan Lepas	FT 6 Malaysia Federal Route 6 – Gertak Sanggul, Penara, Balik Pulau, Penang International Airport, Sungai Nibong, Gelugor, George Town	T-junctions
Bayan Lepas			Kampung Bukit		
Bayan Lepas			Kampung Seronok		
Bayan Lepas			Kampung Padang		
Batu Maung			Kampung Binjai		
Batu Maung			Kampung Permatang Damar Laut		
Batu Maung			Taman Sri Bayan		
Batu Maung			Rumah Murah Fasa 2		
Batu Maung			Rumah Murah Fasa 1		
Batu Maung			Kampung Permatang Tepi Bendang		
Batu Maung			Taman Muhibbah		
Batu Maung			Kampung Masjid	Taman Ipeng	T-junctions
Batu Maung			Jalan Teluk Tempoyak	P222 Jalan Teluk Tempoyak – Teluk Tempoyak	T-junctions
Batu Maung			Batu Maung	Jalan Pekan Batu Maung – Batu Maung town centre, MAS Complex, Cargo Terminal; P220 Jalan Permatang Damar Laut – Permatang Damar Laut, Penang War Museum	Diamond interchange
Batu Maung			Batu Maung–Bayan Lepas Industrial Area see also Sultan Abdul Halim Muadzam Shah Bridge / FT 3113		
1.000 mi = 1.609 km; 1.000 km = 0.621 mi: Concurrency terminus
