= Tun Dr Lim Chong Eu Expressway =

Highway in the Malaysian state of Penang

Federal Route 3113
- Tun Dr Lim Chong Eu Expressway
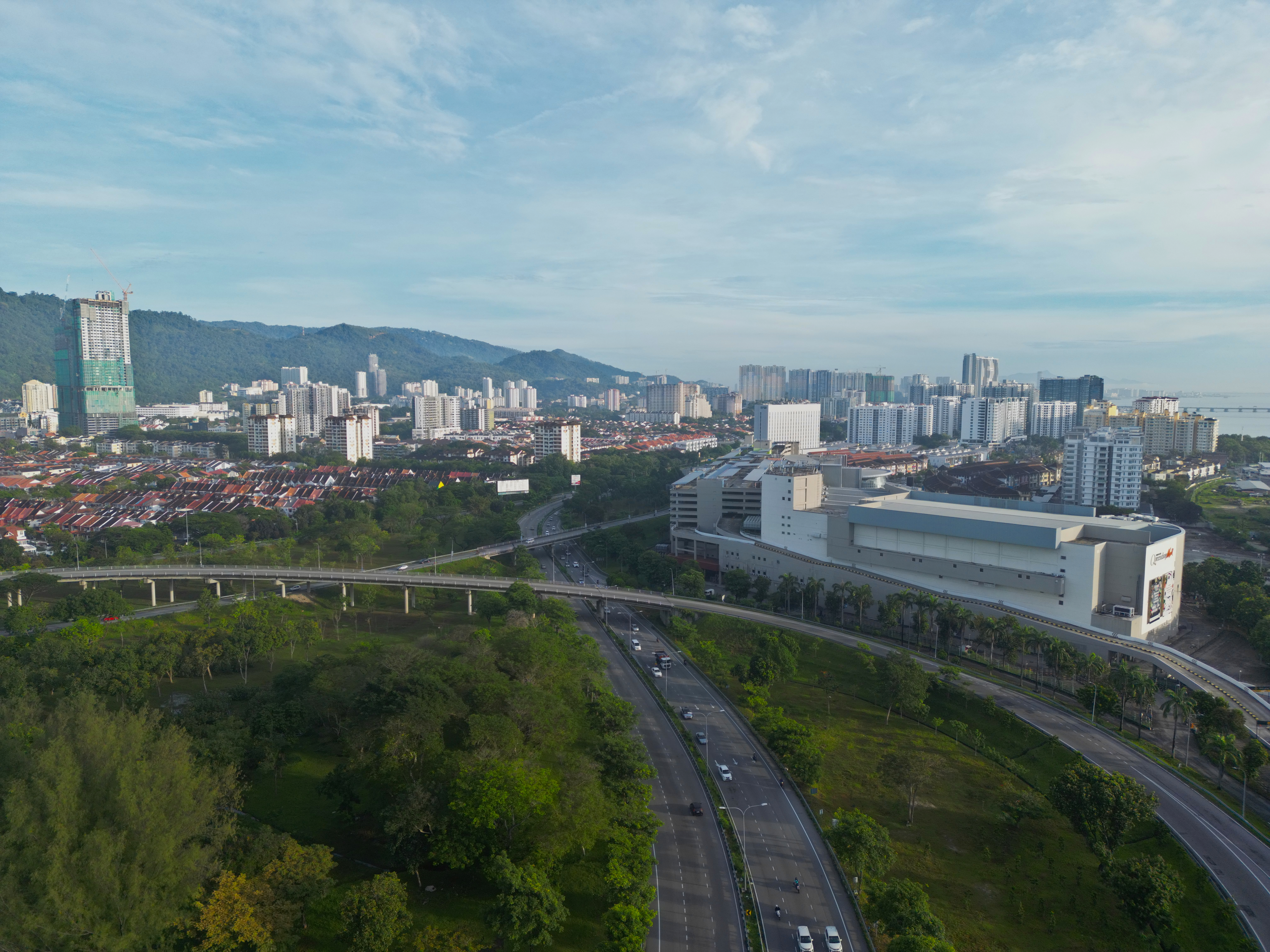

Route information
- Maintained by the Public Works Department
- Length: 17.8 km (11.1 mi)
- Time period: 1983–present

Major junctions
- North end: FT 6 Federal Route 6 in Weld Quay
- P19 Penang Middle Ring Road; Penang Bridge; FT 231 Jalan Tun Dr Awang; Sultan Abdul Halim Muadzam Shah Bridge
- South end: P10 P10 in Batu Maung

Location
- Country: Malaysia
- States: Penang
- Districts: North-East; South-West

Highway system
- Highways in Malaysia; Expressways; Federal; State

The Tun Dr Lim Chong Eu Expressway (Chinese: 敦林苍佑大道; Malay: Lebuhraya Tun Dr Lim Chong Eu), signed as Federal Route 3113, is an expressway in George Town that connects its city centre with Batu Maung at its south. This 17.8 kilometres (11.1 mi) expressway stretches along the eastern coast of Penang Island. It was named in honour of Penang's second chief minister, Lim Chong Eu who died in 2010. There are two sections of the expressway, the Jelutong Expressway and Bayan Lepas Expressway.

== Route background ==
Kilometre zero is located at Batu Maung. The second elevated highway in Penang after Kuala Lumpur and Bayan Baru was constructed at Bayan Lepas Expressway here. This long flyover links the newer Penang Second Bridge in the south straight away to Bayan Baru for skipping traffic jams.

The underpass under it is used to travel along Bayan Lepas industrial area.

== History ==
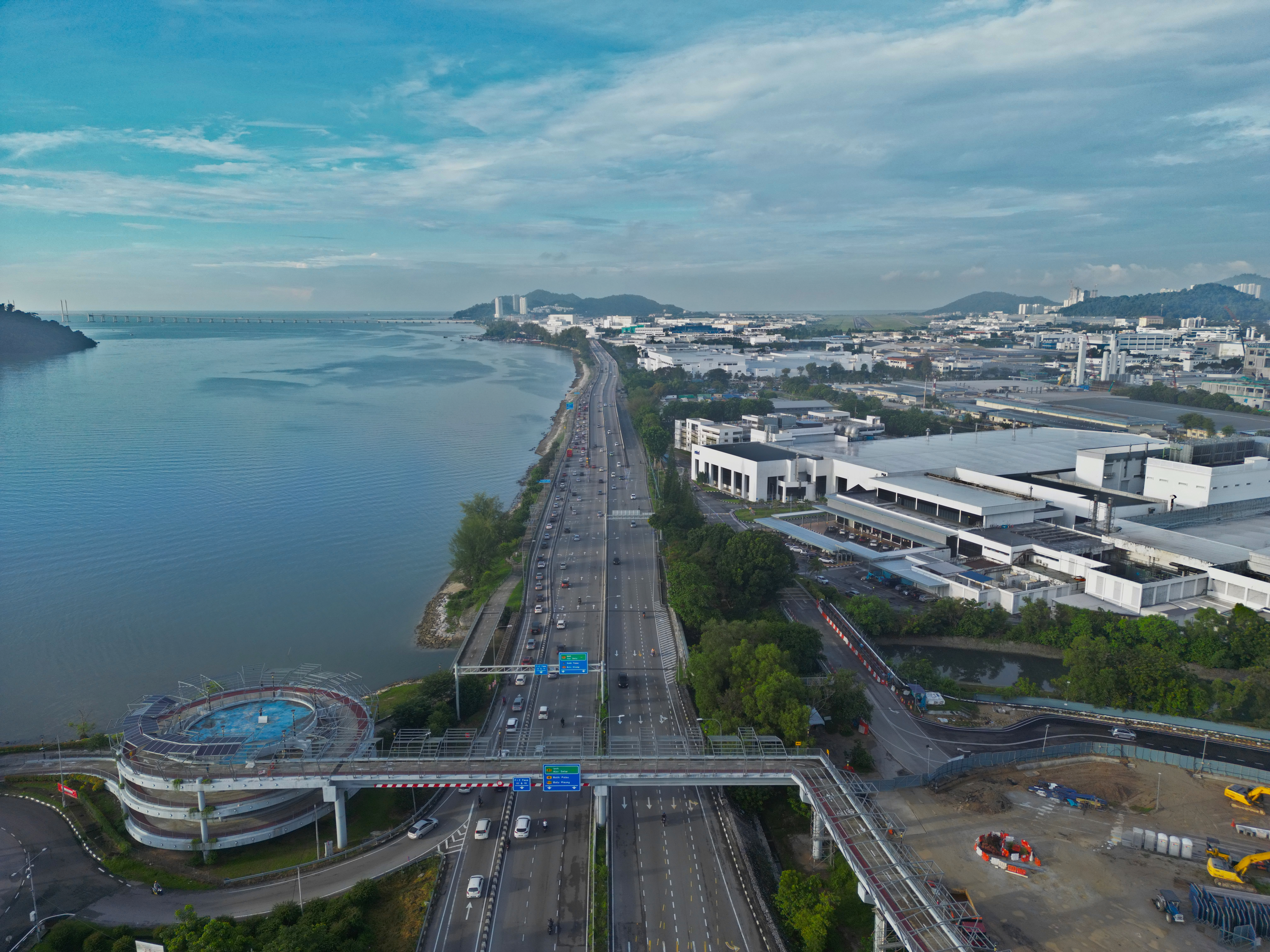
A stretch of the expressway along the Bayan Lepas Free Industrial Zone, facing south

The pioneer route for the expressway was constructed on 1983 during the Penang Bridge was built and was completed in 1985. Later, the expressway was extended northwards as the Jelutong Expressway, and southwards as the Bayan Lepas Expressway.

On 7 December 2010, after former second Penang chief minister Lim Chong Eu died on 24 November 2010, the Penang state government renamed the expressway Tun Dr Lim Chong Eu Expressway in his honour.

Construction of the 6 km (3.7 mi) long Ayer Itam–Tun Dr Lim Chong Eu Expressway Bypass, part of the Penang Transport Master Plan, is expected to be completed by 2025. The bypass was designed to disperse traffic from the expressway by providing a direct route through Gelugor to Paya Terubong.

== Features ==
At most sections, the Federal Route 3113 was built under the JKR R5 road standard, allowing maximum speed limit of up to 90 km/h.

=== Overlaps ===
There is one overlap

Jalan Tengku Kudin–Gelugor-Penang Bridge: Penang Bridge

There are sections with motorcycle lanes, however some motorcycle lanes are closed for LRT Mutiara Line construction.

== Incidents ==
- On 13 November 2025, a 17-year-old motorcyclists crashed by an express bus and died.

== Interchange lists ==
The entire route is located in Penang Island, Penang.

Legend:

- I/C - Interchange, I/S - Intersection, RSA - Rest and service area, OBR - Overhead bridge restaurant, R/R - Restaurant and rest plaza, L/B - Layby, V/P - Vista point, TN - tunnel, T/P - Toll plaza, BR - Bridge
- C - Cloverleaf, S - Stack, T-A - Trumpet-A, T-B - Trumpet-B, DT - Directional-T/Y, SDT - Semi-Directional-T/Y, P-Y - Partial-Y, D - Diamond, P-C - Partial cloverleaf, D-D - Diverging diamond, D-R - Direct ramp

District	Location	km	mi	Exit	Name	Destinations	Notes
Northeast	George Town				Pengkalan Weld	Pengkalan Weld – Pengkalan Raja Tun Uda (Ferry to Butterworth), Jalan Padang Kota Lama (The Esplanade), Batu Feringgi, Pulau Tikus, Persiaran Gurney, Jalan Sekolah (Burma Road)	
Northeast	George Town			1	Gat Jalan Perangin I/C	Gat Jalan Perangin	T-Junction into expressway and Weld Quay
Northeast	George Town			2	Magazine Road I/C	Jalan Magazine (Magazine Road) – Jalan Penang (Penang Road), KOMTAR, Jalan Dato Keramat, Jalan Burma, Batu Feringgi	T-junctions
Northeast	George Town			3	MacCalum Street Ghaut I/C	Changkat Lebuh MacCalum (MacCalum Street Ghaut) – Jelutong	
Northeast	George Town			4	Cecil Street Ghaut I/S	Changkat Lebuh Cecil (Cecil Street Ghaut) – Jelutong	
Northeast	George Town			Sungai Pinang bridge			
Northeast	Jelutong			5	Sungai Pinang I/C	Jalan Sungai Pinang – Bandar Sungai Pinang, Air Itam, Jalan Dato Keramat; Persiaran Karpal Singh 1 (Lebuh Sungai Pinang 1) – Fortune Park, Persiaran Karpal Singh (IJM Promenade)	Diamond interchange
Northeast	Jelutong			6	Pokok Asam I/C	Jalan Ahmad Nor – Kampung Pokok Asam, Jelutong	Diamond interchange
Northeast	Gelugor			7B	Greenlane I/C	Jalan Delima – Bukit Gambir, Batu Lanchang (Greenlane)	Trumpet Interchange (North bound only) and ramped into George Town only
Northeast	Gelugor			7A	USM I/C	Penang Bridge – Butterworth, Perai; FT 6 Malaysia Federal Route 6 – Tapak Pesta, Penang Bus Terminal, Sg. Dua / Glugor	Big Trumpet Interchange (South bound from George Town and Perai bound only)
Northeast	Gelugor			8	Bayan Mutiara I/C	Persiaran Bayan Mutiara – Queensbay, Persiaran Bayan Indah, Jerejak Island, Bukit Jambul	Directional-Y interchange
Northeast–Southwest district border				Sungai Dua bridge			
Southwest	Bayan Lepas			9	Jalan Aziz Ibrahim I/C	P15 Jalan Aziz Ibrahim – Eastin Hotel, Lebuh Bukit Jambul (U-Turn roundabout), Sungai Dua, Paya Terubong, Relau, Sungai Nibong	Interchange
Southwest	Bayan Lepas			10	Sungai Nibong I/C	FT 281 Malaysia Federal Route 281 – Bayan Baru, Bukit Jambul, Balik Pulau, Bayan Lepas, Penang International Airport; Queensbay – Queensbay Mall	Huge Directional-Y interchange
Southwest	Bayan Lepas			Sungai Nibong bridge			
Southwest	Bayan Lepas			11	Jalan Kampung Jawa I/C	Jalan Kampung Jawa – Kampung Jawa, Jalan Mahsuri	Half-diamond interchange
Southwest	Bayan Lepas			Bayan Lepas food court			
Southwest	Bayan Lepas			Parit MOX bridge			
Southwest	Bayan Lepas			12	Lebuhraya Kampung Jawa I/C	FT 3114 Lebuhraya Kampung Jawa – Kampung Jawa	Half-diamond interchange
Southwest	Bayan Lepas			Sungai Kluang bridge			
Southwest	Bayan Lepas			13	Bayan Lepas Industrial Area I/S	Jalan Hilir Sungai Kluang 1	Half-diamond interchange
Southwest	Bayan Lepas			Sungai Tiram bridge			
Southwest	Bayan Lepas				Bayan Lepas Industrial Area–Batu Maung	see also Sultan Abdul Halim Muadzam Shah Bridge	
Southwest	Batu Maung	0.0	0.0		Batu Maung	Jalan Pekan Batu Maung – Batu Maung town centre, MAS Complex, Cargo Terminal; P220 Jalan Permatang Damar Laut – Permatang Damar Laut, Penang War Museum	Diamond interchange
Southwest	Batu Maung			Through to P10 Jalan Batu Maung			
1.000 mi = 1.609 km; 1.000 km = 0.621 mi: Concurrency terminus; Route transition
