= Teluk Kumbar =

- Suburb of George Town
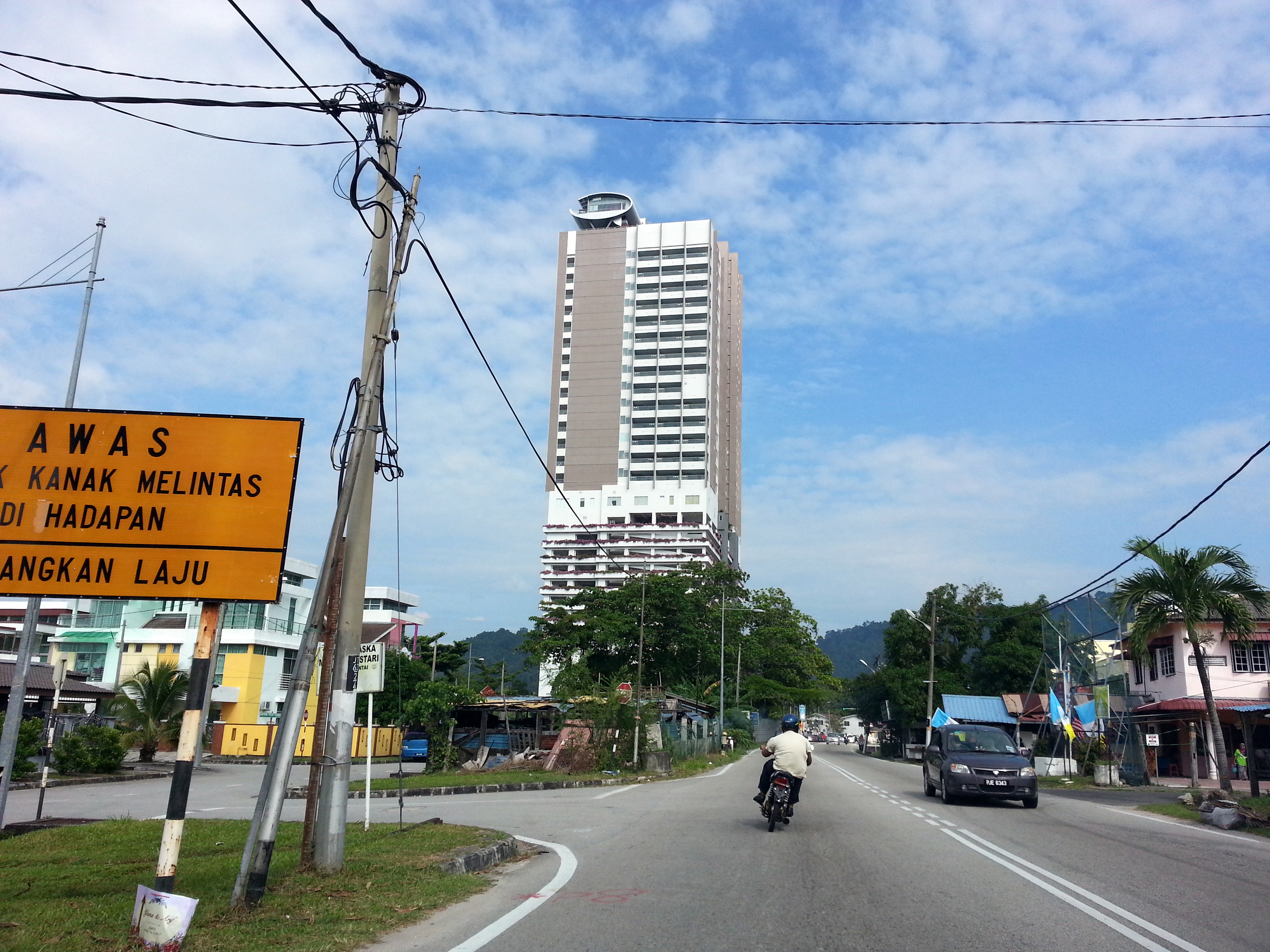

- Location within George Town in Penang
- Coordinates: 5°17′12″N 100°14′18″E
- Country: Malaysia
- State: Penang
- City: George Town
- District: Southwest

Area
  - Total: 6.8 km^{2} (2.6 sq mi)

Population (2020)
  - Total: 21,481
  - Density: 3,200/km^{2} (8,200/sq mi)

Demographics
  - Ethnic groups: 68.2% Bumiputera; 67.7% Malay; 0.5% indigenous groups from Sabah and Sarawak; 21.8% Chinese; 5.0% Indian; 0.5% Other ethnicities; 4.5% Non-citizens
- Time zone: UTC+8 (MST)
  - Summer (DST): Not observed
- Postal code: 11920

Teluk Kumbar is a suburb of George Town in the Malaysian state of Penang. It is located about 17.8 km (11.1 mi) south of the city centre, at the southern coast of Penang Island between Bayan Lepas to the east and Gertak Sanggul to the west.

== Etymology ==
Teluk Kumbar in Malay literally means 'kumbar bay', a reference to the salak trees (Salacca zalacca; Malay: kumbar) that grew within the area.

== History ==
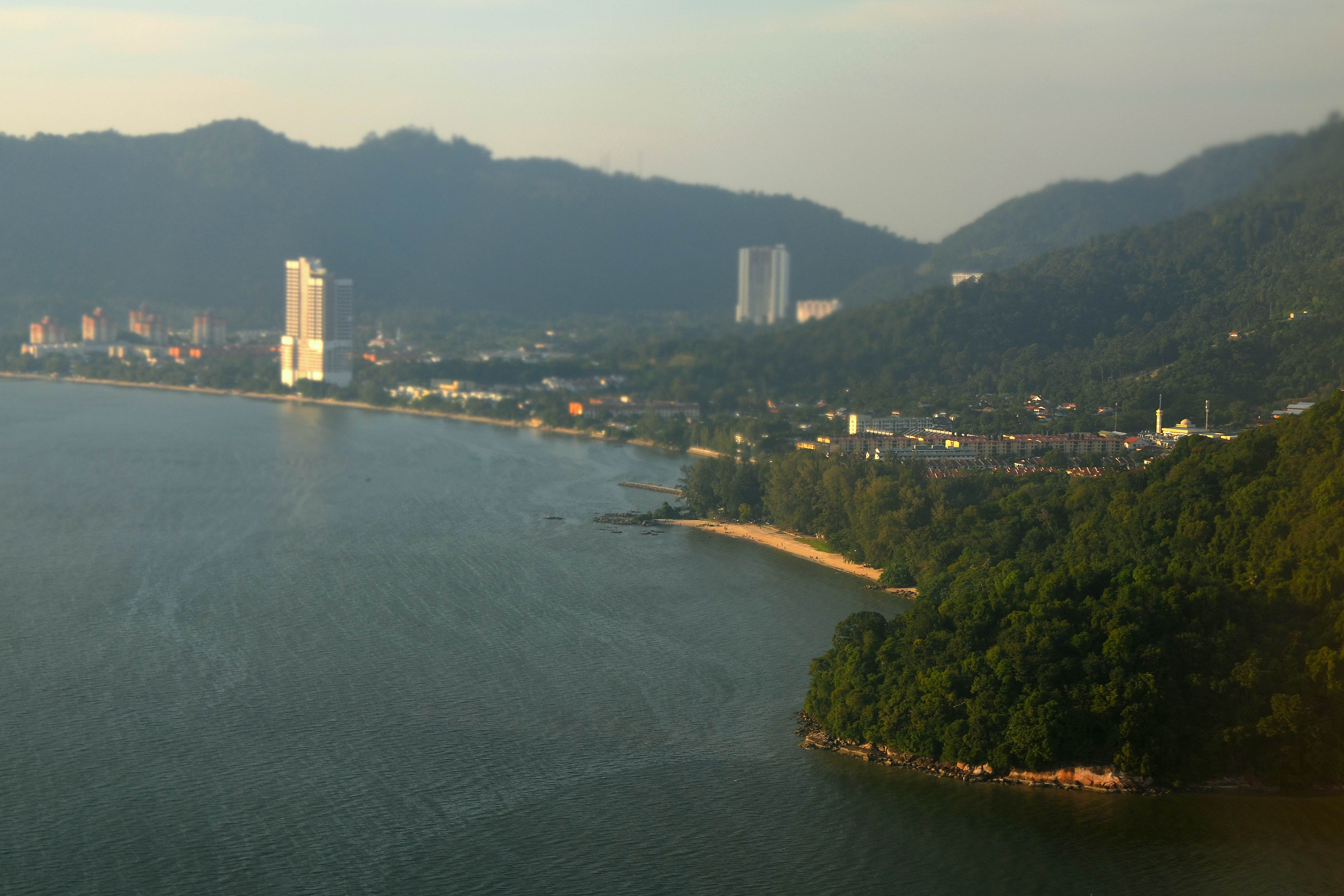
Aerial view of Teluk Kumbar from the southeast

According to historians in Universiti Sains Malaysia, Teluk Kumbar was founded by two Malay pioneers - Nakhoda Seedin from Deli and Panglima Long from Setul - sometime in the late 18th century. The agricultural town was one of the handful of autonomous Malay settlements that were established at the south of Penang Island at the time.

Until the late 20th century, the town's residents depended on rice farming and fishing as the main economic activities. In the 1990s, the development of Teluk Kumbar was spearheaded by the Penang Regional Development Authority (PERDA), an agency of the Malaysian federal government which was tasked with the development of rural areas within Penang.

== Geography ==
Map of Teluk Kumbar.
Click link at the top right corner to zoom in.
1 Teluk Bayu
2 Sungai Batu
3 Kampung Seronok
4 One Foresta

== Demographics ==
Ethnicities within Teluk Kumbar in 2020
Ethnicities / Nationality	Percentage
Malays	67.7%
Other Bumiputeras	0.5%
Chinese	21.8%
Indians	5.0%
Others	0.5%
Non-Malaysians	4.5%

As of 2020, Teluk Kumbar was home to a population of 21,481. Malays constituted nearly 68% of the suburb's population, while Chinese made up another two-fifths, followed by Indians at 5%.

== Transportation ==
Jalan Teluk Kumbar is the main thoroughfare within the town. It forms part of the pan-island Federal Route 6, linking Teluk Kumbar with Bayan Lepas to the east and Gertak Sanggul to the west. To alleviate worsening traffic congestion in the area, the Malaysian Public Works Department has widened a stretch of the road leading to the town in 2017.

Rapid Penang bus routes 308, 401 and 401E include stops within Teluk Kumbar. These routes connect the town with various destinations, including the city centre, the Penang International Airport, Universiti Sains Malaysia, Queensbay Mall, Sungai Nibong, Bayan Lepas and Balik Pulau.

== Education ==
Teluk Kumbar is served by two primary schools and two high schools.

Primary schools

- SK Bayan Lepas II
- SK Sungai Batu

High schools

- SMK Bayan Lepas
- SMK Sungai Batu
