= List of Islamic falak location spots in Malaysia =

List of the Islamic falak location spots in Malaysia.

== Location spots ==
States or territory	Falak observatory/location spots
Johor	Sultan Ismail Building, Pontian Kechil, Pontian
Kedah	Kampung Pulau Sayak, Kuala Muda; Langkawi Look Out Spot, Langkawi Island; Alor Star Tower, Alor Setar
Kelantan	Bukit Peraksi, Pasir Puteh; Bukit Kampung Tembeling, Manjur; Olak Jeram, Kuala Krai; Menara Bangunan SEDC, Jalan Tengku Putra Semerak, Kota Bharu
Melaka	Al-Khawarizmi Observatory, Kampung Balik Batu, Tanjung Bidara
Negeri Sembilan	Teluk Kemang, Port Dickson
Pahang	Tanjong Batu Hill, Nenasi; Mount Brinchang, Cameron Highlands; Bukit Pelindung, Kuantan; Kuantan 188 Tower, Kuantan
Perak	Pantai Pasir Panjang, Pengkalan Baru, Manjung
Perlis	Kuala Sungai Baru, Simpang Empat; Al-Hussain Mosque, Kuala Perlis
Penang	Sheikh Tahir Jalaluddin Falak Observatory, Pantai Aceh
Sabah	Al-Biruni Observatory, Tanjung Dumpil, Putatan
Sarawak	Tanjung Lubang, Miri; Teluk Bandung, Kuching; Tanjung Batu, Bintulu
Selangor	Bukit Melawati, Kuala Selangor; Pulau Angsa, Kuala Selangor; Bukit Jugra, Banting, Kuala Langat
Terengganu	Bukit Besar, Kuala Terengganu; Bukit Kemuning, Kemaman; Perhentian Island, Besut; Balai Cerap KUSZA, Bukit Merang, Setiu
Federal Territories	Kuala Lumpur Tower, Kuala Lumpur; Putrajaya International Convention Centre (PICC), Putrajaya; Universiti Malaysia Sabah International Campus tower, Kampung Sungai Pagar, Labuan
