= Pantai Acheh =

- Suburb of George Town
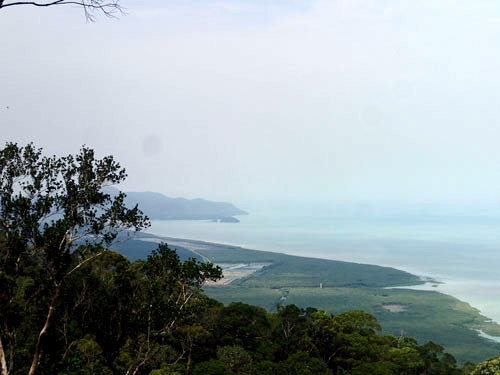

- Location within George Town in Penang
- Coordinates: 5°24′53.82″N 100°11′46.9104″E
- Country: Malaysia
- State: Penang
- City: George Town
- District: Southwest

Area
  - Total: 23 km^{2} (8.9 sq mi)

Population
  - Total: 4,302
  - Density: 190/km^{2} (480/sq mi)

Demographics
  - Ethnic groups: 68.3% Bumiputera; 68.3% Malay; 24.9% Chinese; 5.3% Indian; 0.2% Other ethnicities; 1.1% Non-citizens
- Time zone: UTC+8 (MST)
  - Summer (DST): Not observed
- Postal code: 11010

Pantai Acheh is a suburb of George Town in the Malaysian state of Penang. It is located about 14.8 km (9.2 mi) west of the city centre, at the western coast of Penang Island between Teluk Bahang to the east and Balik Pulau to the south.

== Geography ==
Map of Pantai Acheh.
Click link at the top right corner to zoom in.
1 Penang National Park
2 Sheikh Tahir Astronomical Centre

== Demographics ==
Ethnicities within Pantai Acheh in 2020
Ethnicities / Nationality	Percentage
Malays	68.3%
Chinese	24.9%
Indians	5.3%
Others	0.2%
Non-Malaysians	1.1%

As of 2020, Pantai Acheh was home to a population of 4,302. Malays constituted over 68% of the suburb's population, followed by Chinese at close to 25% and Indians at 5%.

== Transportation ==
Jalan Pantai Acheh is the main road that runs through the heart of the agricultural village. Rapid Penang bus route 404 is the sole public bus route to Pantai Acheh, linking the village with the town of Balik Pulau.

== Education ==
Pantai Acheh contains a single primary school - SJK (C) Chin Hwa.

== Infrastructure ==
The Sheikh Tahir Jalaluddin Falak Observatory, one of the several Islamic observatories in Malaysia, is situated near the village. It functions as a site for the sighting of the new moon at the start of every fasting month.
