= Sungai Pagar =

Village in Federal Territory of Labuan, Malaysia

Sungai Pagar is a small village in Federal Territory of Labuan, Malaysia. The Menara Universiti Malaysia Sabah (UMS) tower and Sekolah Menengah Sains Labuan is located here.
