= Sultan Abdul Halim Muadzam Shah Bridge =

Highway in Penang, Malaysia

Expressway 28
- Sultan Abdul Halim Muadzam Shah Bridge (Penang Second Bridge) 槟威二桥 பினாங்கு இரண்டாவது பாலம்
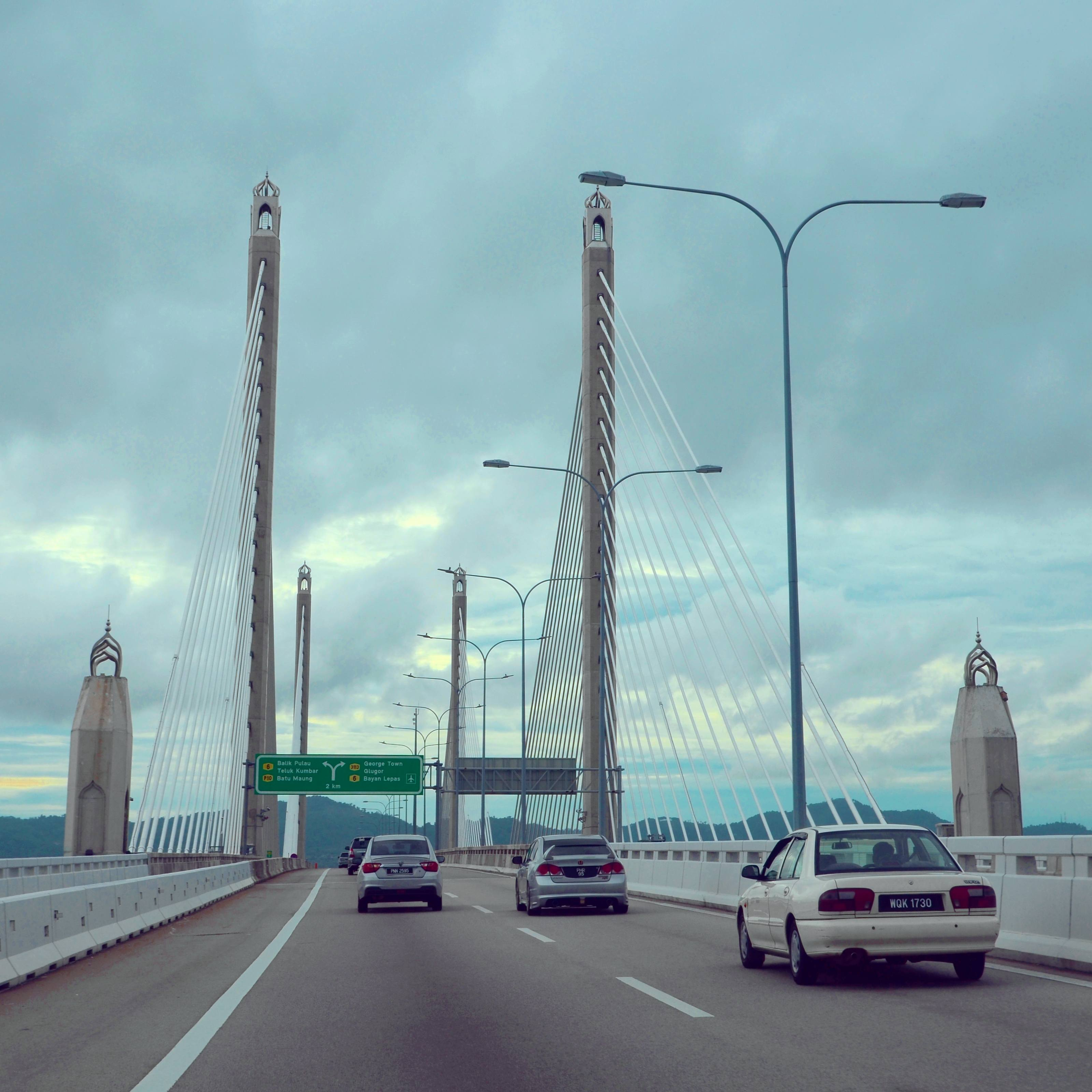
- Sultan Abdul Halim Muadzam Shah Bridge in May 2022

Route information
- Maintained by Jambatan Kedua Sdn Bhd
- Length: 24 km (15 mi)
- Existed: 2006–present
- History: Construction works started November 2008 to be completed in May 2012, but was later delayed to February 2014.; Opening ceremony on 1 March 2014 at 20:30 MST.; Opened to traffic on 2 March 2014 at 00:01 MST.

Major junctions
- East end: Bandar Cassia (Batu Kawan), Seberang Perai
- North–South Expressway Northern Route / AH2; Lebuhraya Bandar Cassia; P10 Jalan Batu Maung; FT 3113 Tun Dr Lim Chong Eu Expressway
- West end: Batu Maung, Penang Island

Location
- Country: Malaysia
- Primary destinations: George Town, Bukit Tambun, Bandar Cassia, Batu Kawan, Simpang Ampat, Juru, Bayan Lepas, Bayan Baru, Batu Maung, Teluk Tempoyak, Permatang Laut, Serdang, Selama, Jelapang, Ipoh

Highway system
- Highways in Malaysia; Expressways; Federal; State

Sultan Abdul Halim Muadzam Shah Bridge (Penang Second Bridge) Jambatan Sultan Abdul Halim Muadzam Shah (Jambatan Kedua Pulau Pinang)
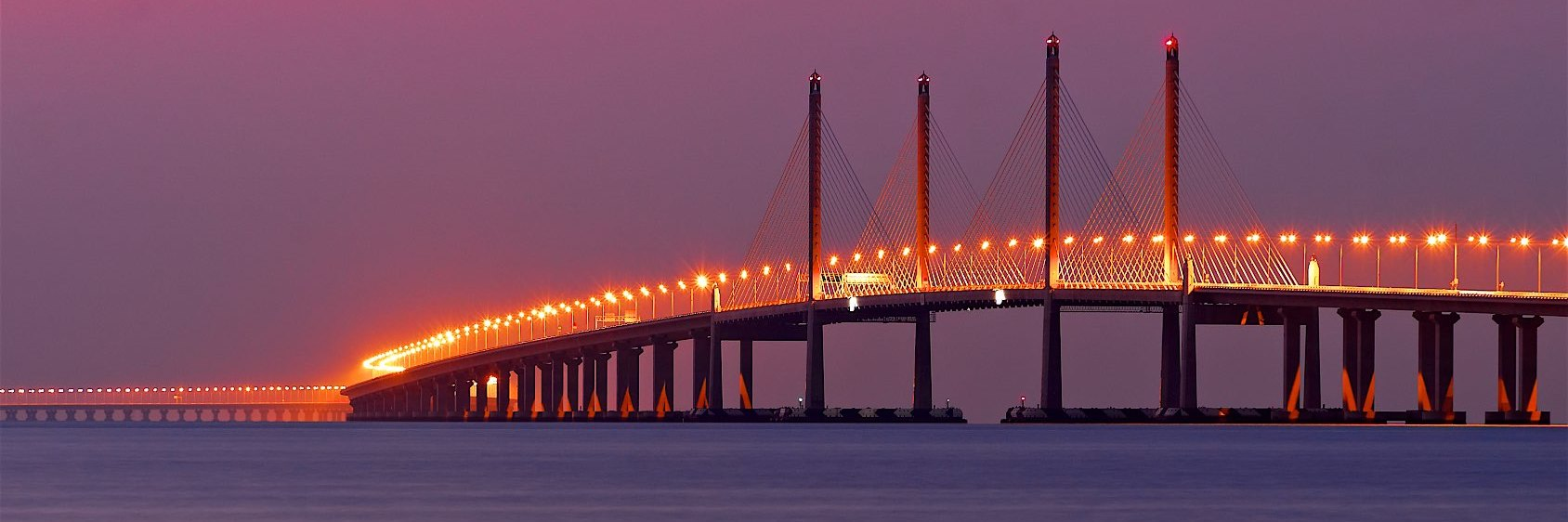
- Coordinates: 5°14′59″N 100°21′05″E
- Carries: Motor vehicles
- Crosses: South Channel, Malaysia
- Locale: Sultan Abdul Halim Muadzam Shah Bridge
- Official name: Sultan Abdul Halim Muadzam Shah Bridge
- Maintained by: Jambatan Kedua Sdn Bhd

Characteristics
- Design: Cable stayed bridge; Box girder bridge
- Total length: 24 km
- Width: --
- Longest span: 250 m

History
- Designer: Primary; Government of Malaysia; Malaysian Highway Authority (LLM); Secondary; Package 1: China Harbour Engineering Co Ltd (CHEC); Package 2: UEM Builders Berhad
- Constructed by: Primary; Package 1: China Harbour Engineering Co Ltd (CHEC); Package 2: UEM Builders Berhad; Package 3A: MAZELE; Package 3B: IJM Construction Sdn Bhd; Package 3C: HRA Teguh Sdn Bhd; Package 3D: SU Citra Bina Sdn Bhd; Secondary; Minconsult Sdn Bhd (C&S Consultant) (Consulting Engineer)
- Construction end: February 2014
- Opened: 2 March 2014 at 00:01 MST
- Inaugurated: 1 March 2014 at 20:30 MST

Location
- Interactive map of Sultan Abdul Halim Muadzam Shah Bridge (Penang Second Bridge)

The Sultan Abdul Halim Muadzam Shah Bridge (Malay: Jambatan Sultan Abdul Halim Muadzam Shah), also known as the Penang Second Bridge (Jambatan Kedua Pulau Pinang), is a dual carriageway toll bridge in Penang, Malaysia. It connects Bandar Cassia (Batu Kawan) in Seberang Perai, Peninsular Malaysia, with Batu Maung on Penang Island. It is the second bridge to link the island to the mainland after Penang Bridge.

The total length of the span is 24 km (15 mi) with 16.9 km (10.5 mi) over water, making it the longest bridge in Malaysia and the second longest in Southeast Asia, behind the 30 km (19 mi) Sultan Haji Omar Ali Saifuddien Bridge in Brunei. China Harbour Engineering Company committed to the construction in November 2007 and planned to complete the project in 2011, but the completion date was postponed to May 2012 and later to February 2014. Construction started in November 2008.

The span was originally given route code E22 but later changed to E28, and E22 was used by Senai–Desaru Expressway. To reduce the cost of construction, its design was modified to resemble Penang Bridge. The project was completed with a major loan from China, in an effort to maintain the economic relationship between the two nations. The Penang Second Bridge was officially opened on 1 March 2014 and was named after the fourteenth Yang di-Pertuan Agong, Sultan Tuanku Abdul Halim Muadzam Shah of Kedah.

== Overview ==
The Sultan Abdul Halim Muadzam Shah Bridge is a High Impact Project launched under the Ninth Malaysia Plan. Being a High Impact Project, it was seen as a key catalyst in the socio-economic development of Malaysia's Northern Corridor Economic Region. The project was delivered by a special purpose concession company formed by the Government of Malaysia, Jambatan Kedua Sdn Bhd (JKSB). The bridge measuring a total of 24 km (15 mi) in length was constructed by UEM Builders Sdn Bhd, a subsidiary of the UEM Group Malaysia, as well as China Harbour Engineering Company (CHEC), a subsidiary of the China Communications Construction Company. Construction of the bridge, linking Batu Kawan on the mainland and Batu Maung on Penang Island, began in November 2008 and was completed in February 2014. The bridge opened to traffic on 2 March 2014.

== Route background ==
Routes across Penang Strait as of 2014

The E28 expressway consists of the bridge and a land expressway linking the bridge to the North–South Expressway Northern Route E1, the main expressway of Peninsular Malaysia.

The start of the expressway is located at its interchange with the North–South Expressway Northern Route E1. The westbound lanes towards the bridge feature a collector-express lanes system, where the collector lanes have an interchange at Exit 2801 to Bandar Cassia and Batu Kawan while the express lanes continue uninterrupted to the bridge. The bridge and expressway end in Batu Maung on Penang Island at the interchange with Tun Dr Lim Chong Eu Expressway.

== History ==
=== Planning ===
The idea to build a second bridge linking Seberang Perai to Penang Island was suggested in 1995 by Prime Minister Mahathir Mohamad and Chief Minister of Penang Koh Tsu Koon. In August 2006, the Malaysian federal government unveiled a plan to build the Penang Second Bridge in the Ninth Malaysia Plan. On 12 November 2006, the groundbreaking ceremony for the new Penang Second Bridge was performed by Prime Minister Abdullah Ahmad Badawi.

=== Construction ===
After months of soil survey work and test piling work, CHEC and UEM announced that the project was on track for completion in 2011. Construction work was expected to begin in January 2008.

In April 2008, the government announced that the project was to be delayed by 9 months due to land acquisition, design issues, and also the rising costs of building materials. Newly elected Chief Minister of Penang, Lim Guan Eng proposed a toll discount for any delays on the project and expressed disappointment regarding the construction delay.

In July 2008, Jelutong MP Jeff Ooi reported that the loan for the bridge risked being withdrawn if the shareholder agreement between UEM Builders Berhad and its joint-venture partner CHEC was not inked by August 2008. It was reported that there were disagreements between the two parties on the apportionment of the cost of building the bridge although the issue was expected to be resolved quickly due to UEM having a variation on the price on its portion.

On 8 November 2008, the construction of the Penang Second Bridge began.

On 3 October 2012, media reports indicated that the bridge was 84% complete, and that the bridge was due to be completed approximately two months ahead of the deadline of September 2013.

On 20 April 2013, the final closure of the cable stayed bridge at the main navigational span of the Penang Second Bridge was completed and thus signified the completion of the construction of the bridge and physically connecting Batu Maung on the Island and Batu Kawan on the Mainland.

On 30 April 2013, Prime Minister Najib Razak became the country's first leader to use the Penang Second Bridge to cross from the island to the mainland to attend a function in Kepala Batas, Seberang Perai.

=== Opening ===
The bridge had been planned for completion on 8 November 2013 and to be opened to the public by the end of November. However, the opening day of 8 November 2013 was postponed.

The opening ceremony of the Penang Second Bridge was held at 20:30 MST on 1 March 2014 and was officially opened by Prime Minister, Najib Razak. The bridge was official named Sultan Abdul Halim Muadzam Shah Bridge after the fourteenth Yang di-Pertuan Agong, Sultan Tuanku Abdul Halim Muadzam Shah of Kedah. At midnight on 2 March 2014, the bridge was opened to traffic at 00:01 MST after the official opening ceremony.

=== Restrictions during MCO ===
During the COVID-19 pandemic, the expressway experienced ramp closures several times. Those ramps were:

- Batu Maung Ramp 4 (BMR4) (Southbound motorists had to make a U-turn at Batu Maung before entering the bridge)
- Bandar Cassia Ramp 7 (BCR7) (Southbound motorists had to make a U-turn at Bandar Cassia before approaching the JK2PP toll plaza)
- Bandar Cassia Toll Plaza A (Westbound motorists had to pay at Plaza B and pay again at JK2PP toll plaza)

== Incidents ==
=== Penang Second Bridge ramp collapse ===
On 6 June 2013, a ramp leading to the still under construction Penang Second Bridge at Batu Maung interchange collapsed at around 7:00 pm, burying a car and two motorcycles under the debris. One person was killed in the incident. The ramp which is part of the Package 3A of the bridge project was built by the contractor Cergas Murni Sdn Bhd.

== Design specifications ==
=== Bridge ===
The Sultan Abdul Halim Muadzam Shah Bridge is designed based on the double "S" curvy concept due to the geological reasons.The numerous "S"-like curves along the 24 km stretch are a requirement under the Road Safety Audit.

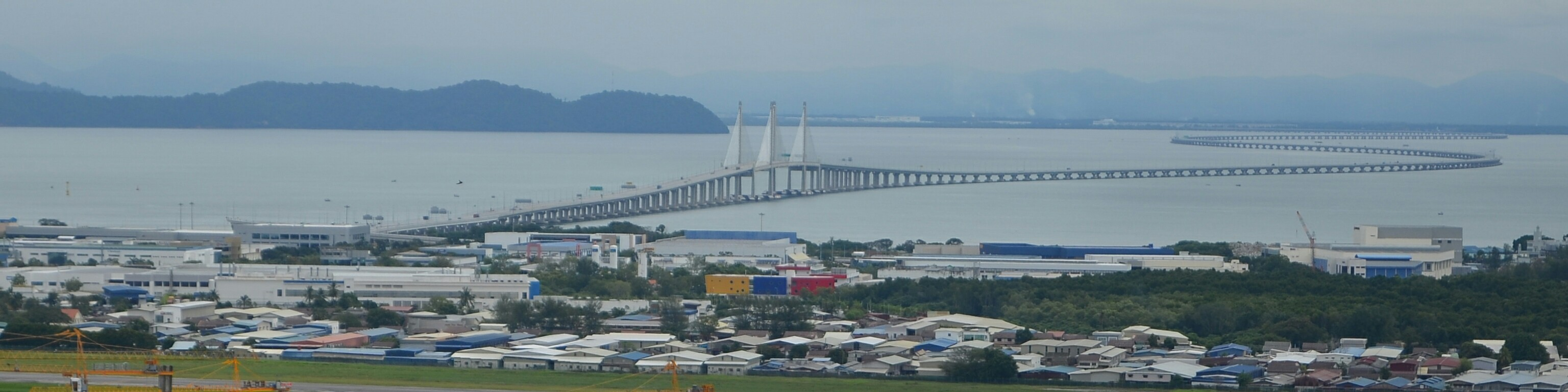
Aerial panorama of the Sultan Abdul Halim Muadzam Shah Bridge with a view of the "S" curves at the right side of the image

The Sultan Abdul Halim Muadzam Shah Bridge is the longest bridge in the world installed with High Damping Natural Rubber Bearing, an effective seismic isolation system that enables the bridge to withstand high intensity earthquakes. The bridge is the first in Malaysia to be installed with seismic expansion joints, which would allow movements during an earthquake.

==== Bridge specifications ====
- Overall length: 24 km (15 mi)
- Length over water: 16.9 km (10.5 mi)
- Main span: Length – 250 m (820 ft)
- Height clearance (above water): 30 m (98 ft)
- Number of vehicle lanes: 2 (with road shoulder) + 1 for motorcycles (each direction)
- Overall cost: RM 4.5 Billion
- Average time taken to drive from Batu Kawan to Batu Maung: 20 mins
- Proposed speed limit on bridge: 80 km/h (50 mph)

=== Land expressway ===
The land expressway is the first in Malaysia to be designed based on an upgraded secondary consolidation criterion of 50-millimeter earth embankment settlement for every 20 years, as compared to the Penang Bridge whose 367-millimeter earth embankment has to be settled every five years.

== Tolls ==
Penang Second Bridge Integrated Toll Plaza Bandar Cassia PLUS Toll Plaza (Gateway Arch Toll Plaza)
- Plaza Tol Bersepadu Jambatan Kedua Pulau Pinang; Plaza Tol PLUS Bandar Cassia (Plaza Tol Pintu Gerbang)
- Interactive map of the Penang Second Bridge Integrated Toll Plaza; Bandar Cassia PLUS Toll Plaza (Gateway Arch Toll Plaza) area

General information
- Architectural style: Structural expressionism
- Location: Sultan Abdul Halim Muadzam Shah Bridge, Penang, Malaysia
- Construction started: 2011
- Completed: February 2014
- Opened: 2 March 2014 at 00:01 MST
- Inaugurated: 1 March 2014 at 20:30 MST
- Renovated: February 2014

Technical details
- Floor count: 28 booths

=== Overview ===
The bridge and the link road to the North–South Expressway are maintained by a private concession company, Jambatan Kedua Sdn Bhd (JKSB). The toll for the bridge is similar to the toll scheme for the Penang Bridge, where a fee is collected one way when crossing the bridge from the mainland to Penang Island, while no fee is imposed for mainland-bound motorists coming from the island. On the other hand, the toll for the link road between the bridge and the North–South Expressway is collected in both directions.

There was a toll-free trial period during the opening month from 2 March until 31 March 2014. Toll collection began on 1 April 2014 at 6am. There are two toll plazas on the route: the Penang Second Bridge Integrated Toll Plaza (Bandar Cassia PLUS Toll Plaza) and the Penang Second Bridge Toll Plaza (JK2PP Toll Plaza).

==== Penang Second Bridge Integrated Toll Plaza (Bandar Cassia PLUS Toll Plaza) ====
The Penang Second Bridge Integrated Toll Plaza or Bandar Cassia PLUS Toll Plaza, also known as Gateway Arch Toll Plaza after its gateway arch design, is the main toll plaza for Sultan Abdul Halim Muadzam Shah Bridge. Upon completion in February 2014, it is the largest toll plaza in Malaysia, overtaking the Sungai Besi Toll Plaza of the North–South Expressway Southern Route E2. The toll plaza is Malaysia's longest non-vehicular span steel arch structure. It is also the first in Malaysia to be awarded with a Platinum rating in the Green Building Index.

Situated between the North–South Expressway (Exit 157) and Bandar Cassia (Exit 2801) interchanges, the Bandar Cassia PLUS Toll Plaza is managed by PLUS Expressways, the highway concessionaire of the North–South Expressway.

In the westbound direction towards the bridge, the toll plaza is the starting point of the collector-express lanes system with division into two sections: Plaza A for the express lanes to the bridge and Plaza B for the collector lanes to the Bandar Cassia interchange. At Plaza A, three tolls are collected from motorists: the PLUS closed toll collection for the North–South Expressway, the toll for the link road and the toll for the bridge; the latter two are collected on behalf of JKSB. At Plaza B, only the first two tolls are collected without the bridge component, as it is intended for motorists heading towards Bandar Cassia and Batu Kawan without using the bridge.

In the eastbound direction towards the North–South Expressway, the toll plaza serves as the entry point into the PLUS closed toll system. The toll for the link road is collected together with the PLUS closed toll when the motorist exits the closed toll system.

Beginning 26 April 2017, only Touch 'n Go cards and SmartTAGs are accepted for toll payment. PLUS transit ticket is no longer issued for entry at Bandar Cassia toll plaza.

==== Penang Second Bridge Toll Plaza (JK2PP Toll Plaza) ====
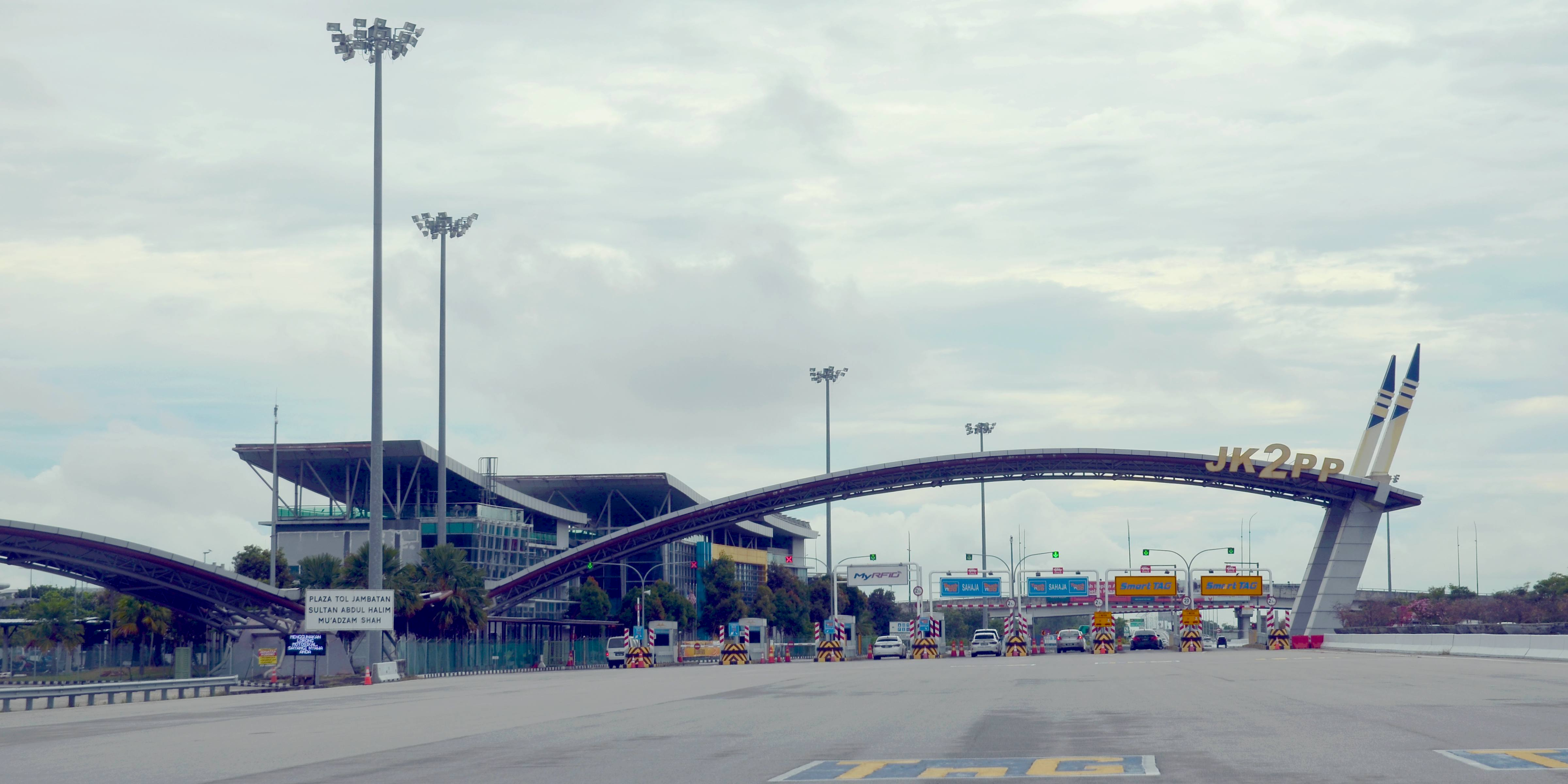
The JK2PP toll plaza

The Penang Second Bridge Toll Plaza or JK2PP Toll Plaza is located on the collector lanes after the Bandar Cassia interchange (Exit 2801), before merging with the express lanes towards the bridge. The toll plaza is managed by Jambatan Kedua Sdn Bhd (JKSB).

The toll for the bridge is collected from motorists going towards the bridge from the Bandar Cassia interchange, as well as from those who had used Plaza B at the Bandar Cassia PLUS Toll Plaza and travelled on the collector lanes to the bridge. Motorists travelling on the express lanes bypass the JK2PP Toll Plaza, as they had already paid the toll for the bridge at Plaza A of the Bandar Cassia PLUS Toll Plaza.

Motorcyclists used to pay a bridge toll of RM1.70 at the JK2PP Toll Plaza. However, since 1 January 2019, toll collection for motorcyclists was abolished for both Penang bridges. To date, the toll plaza canopy for motorcyclists remain.

Since 1 June 2016, all electronic toll transactions have been conducted using Touch 'n Go cards and SmartTAGs. The SmartTAG and MyRFID lanes are for light vehicles only. Cash payment is no longer accepted.

=== Fares ===
Due to high construction cost and lower than expected revenue, the 20% toll discount applicable for Penang citizens, workers and students are not offered for the second bridge.

(Since 1 February 2020)

| Class | Types of vehicles | Rate (in Malaysian Ringgit (RM)) | |
| Class | Types of vehicles | Bandar Cassia | JK2PP |
|---|---|---|---|
| 0 | Motorcycles (Vehicles with two axles and two wheels) | Free | |
| 1 | Private Cars (Vehicles with two axles and three or four wheels (excluding taxis and buses)) | 0.60 | 5.74 |
| 2 | Vans and other small goods vehicles (Vehicles with two axles and five or six wheels (excluding buses)) | 0.90 | 30.50 |
| 3 | Large Trucks (Vehicles with three or more axles (excluding buses)) | 1.20 | 70.10 |
| 4 | Taxis | 0.30 | 8.50 |
| 5 | Buses | 0.50 | 26.20 |

== Facilities ==
=== JKSB Ronda ===
JKSB Ronda is the highway patrol unit that patrols along the Sultan Abdul Halim Muadzam Shah Bridge and land expressways and also provides assistance to commuters on the bridge. The current highway patrol vehicles are the Japanese made Toyota Hilux and the Mitsubishi i-MiEV, the four-seater electric vehicle, is able to travel 150 km after an eight-hour full charge. Seven charging stations were also set up at the toll plaza on the mainland, two of them being rapid chargers which are able to give an 80 percent charge in 30 minutes.

==== Inventory ====
| Vehicle | Origin | Type | In service | Notes |
|---|---|---|---|---|
| Mitsubishi i-MiEV | Japan | Highway patrol vehicles | 2014–present | First highway patrol electric vehicles in Malaysia. |
| Toyota Hilux | Japan | Highway patrol vehicles and tow truck | 2014–present | |

=== Rest and service areas (R&R) ===
Two future rest and service areas (R&R) are located at Batu Kawan on the mainland. They will be built in six months' time. The plan was to have a floating rest and service area on the middle of the bridge. However, the plan was scrapped due to high costs.

== Junction lists ==
The entire route is located in Penang.

Legend:

- I/C - Interchange, I/S - Intersection, RSA - Rest and service area, OBR - Overhead bridge restaurant, R/R - Restaurant and rest plaza, L/B - Layby, V/P - Vista point, TN - tunnel, T/P - Toll plaza, BR - Bridge
- C - Cloverleaf, S - Stack, T-A - Trumpet-A, T-B - Trumpet-B, DT - Directional-T/Y, SDT - Semi-Directional-T/Y, P-Y - Partial-Y, D - Diamond, P-C - Partial cloverleaf, D-D - Diverging diamond, D-R - Direct ramp

| District | km | Exit | Name | Destinations | Notes |
|---|---|---|---|---|---|
| South Seberang Perai | 0.0 | 2800 157 | Bandar Cassia-NSE I/C | North–South Expressway Northern Route / AH2 – Alor Setar, Gerik, Butterworth, Kuala Lumpur, Ipoh, Jawi | |
| South Seberang Perai | 0.2 | BR | Canal bridge | | |
| South Seberang Perai | 0.3 | BR | Sungai Tengah bridge | | |
| South Seberang Perai | 0.5 | 2801 | Bandar Cassia collector-express system | | Westbound only Eastern terminus of collector-express lane system |
| South Seberang Perai | 0.7 | T/P | Penang Second Bridge Integrated Toll Plaza; Bandar Cassia-PLUS Toll Plaza (Gateway Arch Toll Plaza) | NSE-Penang Second Bridge bound Touch 'n Go Touch 'n Go SmartTAG SmartTAG MyRFID MyRFID SmartTAG SmartTAG Touch 'n Go Touch 'n Go NSE-Bandar Cassia bound SmartTAG SmartTAG MyRFID Touch 'n Go Touch 'n Go | Closed-system toll payment for westbound express lanes may include Second Penang Bridge toll collection |
| South Seberang Perai | 1.0 | 2801 | Bandar Cassia-JKPP I/C | Lebuhraya Bandar Cassia (Bandar Cassia Avenue) – Batu Kawan, Bandar Cassia, Bukit Tambun, Simpang Ampat, Batu Kawan Industrial Park, Changkat, Nibong Tebal | Access by westbound direction only possible via collector lanes |
| South Seberang Perai | 1.5 | T/P | Penang Second Bridge Toll Plaza; Bandar Cassia-JKSB Toll Plaza | SmartTAG SmartTAG MyRFID Touch 'n Go Touch 'n Go | Collector lanes only with separate toll payment for Second Penang Bridge |
| South Seberang Perai | | 2801 | Bandar Cassia collector-express system | | Westbound only Western terminus of collector-express lane system |
| South Seberang Perai | | RSA | Second Penang Bridge RSA | Jambatan Sultan Abdul Halim Mu'adzam Shah RSA - | Eastbound, under construction |
| South Seberang Perai | | RSA | Second Penang Bridge RSA | Jambatan Sultan Abdul Halim Mu'adzam Shah RSA - | Westbound, under construction |
| South Seberang Perai–Southwest district border | | BR | Sultan Abdul Halim Muadzam Shah Bridge (Second Penang Bridge) | | Length over water: 16.9 km Main span: 240 m |
| Southwest | 24.0 | 2802 | Batu Maung-JKSB I/C | FT 3113 Tun Dr Lim Chong Eu Expressway – Bayan Lepas Free Industrial Zone, George Town, Penang Hospital, Universiti Sains Malaysia (USM) | Northern terminus of concurrency with FT3113 |
| Southwest | | | Medan Bayan Lepas | Medan Bayan Lepas | Northbound only |
| Southwest | | BR | Sungai Nipah bridge | | |
| Southwest | | | Solok Bayan Lepas | Solok Bayan Lepas | Northbound only |
| Southwest | | | Penang Aquarium | | |
| Southwest | | 2804 | Batu Maung I/S | P10 Jalan Pekan Batu Maung – Batu Maung town centre, MAS Complex, Cargo Terminal; P220 Jalan Permatang Damar Laut – Permatang Damar Laut, Penang War Museum | Signalised at-grade intersection Southern terminus of concurrency with FT3113 |
Through to P10 Jalan Batu Maung

== Jalan Tun Abdullah Ahmad Badawi ==
Jalan Tun Abdullah Ahmad Badawi
- Lebuhraya Bandar Cassia

Major junctions
- North end: Jalan Bukit Tambun
- FT 149 Jalan Bukit Tambun; Sultan Abdul Halim Muadzam Shah Bridge
- South end: Batu Kawan

Location
- Country: Malaysia
- Primary destinations: Bandar Cassia

Highway system
- Highways in Malaysia; Expressways; Federal; State

Jalan Tun Abdullah Ahmad Badawi, formerly Lebuhraya Bandar Cassia is a major road in Penang, Malaysia.

=== Junction list ===
The entire route is located in South Seberang Perai District, Penang.

| km | Exit | Name | Destinations | Notes |
|---|---|---|---|---|
| | | Batu Kawan | FT 149 Jalan Bukit Tambun – Pengkalan Batu Kawan, Aman Island (Jetty), Bukit Tambun, Simpang Ampat, Sungai Bakap, Bukit Mertajam; North–South Expressway Northern Route / AH2 – Alor Setar, Ipoh, Kuala Lumpur | Roundabout |
| | | Batu Kawan; Batu Kawan Sports Complex | Batu Kawan Stadium | |
| | | Bandar Cassia | Lingkaran Cassia Timur | Junctions |
| | | Bandar Cassia | | |
| | | Bandar Cassia-JKPP | Sultan Abdul Halim Muadzam Shah Bridge (Penang Second Bridge/Batu Kawan Expressway) – Batu Maung, Bayan Lepas, Penang International Airport; North–South Expressway Northern Route / AH2 – Alor Setar, Butterworth, Ipoh, Kuala Lumpur | Cloverleaf interchange |
| | | Bandar Cassia | | |

== Facts and figures ==
- Sultan Abdul Halim Muadzam Shah Bridge is the longest bridge in Malaysia and second longest in Southeast Asia, after Temburong Bridge. It was listed in the Malaysian Book of Records.
- Penang Second Bridge Integrated Toll Plaza or Gateway Arch Toll Plaza is the largest toll plaza in Malaysia. It was listed into the Malaysian Book of Records.
- The longest bridge over the water in Malaysia and Southeast Asia at 16.9 km.
- The longest bridge in Malaysia installed with High Damping Natural Rubber Bearing that provides effective seismic isolation system that enables the bridge to withstand high intensity earthquakes.
- The bridge's 2.3 meter diameter bore pile designed for the Main Span bored 127 meter deep is among the deepest in the world.
- The Statnamic load test conducted at Pier 24 was the biggest Statnamic load test ever conducted in the world at 54MN.
- The first bridge to deploy electric vehicles as its Patrol Vehicle for the bridge and land expressway.
- Sultan Abdul Halim Mu’adzam Shah Bridge Toll Plaza Complex (Gateway Arch Toll Plaza) is the first in Malaysia to be awarded with a Platinum rating for the Green Building Index.
- The land expressway is the first in Malaysia to be designed for upgraded secondary consolidation criteria at 50mm settlement in 20 years.
- The first bridge in Malaysia installed with seismic expansion joints.
- First bridge in Malaysia installed with noise reduction seismic expansion joints.
- Malaysia's first third generation saddles at Pylon 25 & 26 for Main Span Stayed Cable Bridge.
- Largest Toll Plaza Complex in Malaysia installed with Ethylene Tetrfluoroethylene as its roof canopy (Jambatan Sultan Abdul Halim Mu’adzam Shah Integrated Toll Plaza/ Bandar Cassia PLUS Toll Plaza).
- Malaysia's longest pre-joined precast spun concrete piles were driven in the construction of this project.
- The first bridge in Malaysia to use the TL-4 movable barrier at the median crossing (every 2 km interval), which can stand impact from trucks, busses or other heavy vehicles.
- Installation of Dynamic Road Signage, which allow road users to access real time traffic conditions on the first bridge and Jambatan Sultan Abdul Halim Mu’adzam Shah. The first of such system installed in Malaysia.
- Sultan Abdul Halim Mu’adzam Shah Bridge Integrated Toll Plaza/ Bandar Cassia PLUS Toll Plaza is Malaysia's largest non-vehicular span steel arch structure erected, greeting the road users coming from PLUS Expressway.

== Commemorative events ==
=== Postage stamps ===
The commemorative postage stamps to mark the opening of the Sultan Abdul Halim Muadzam Shah Bridge on 1 March 2014 was issued by Pos Malaysia on 31 December 2014. The denominations for these stamps were RM 1.20.

== Bridge in popular culture ==
- The Sultan Abdul Halim Muadzam Shah Bridge (Penang Second Bridge) was featured in an episode of Megastructures on the National Geographic Channel and TV1.
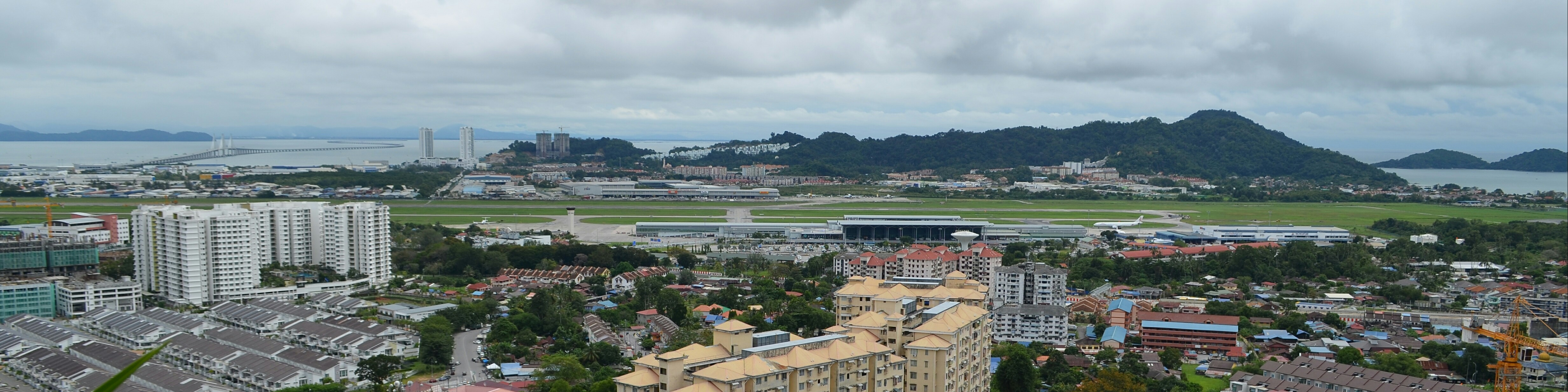
Panoramic aerial view of Penang airport and second bridge in January 2017

== See also ==
- Penang Bridge
- Penang
- List of bridges by length
- Malaysian National Projects
