= Penang Bridge =

Road bridge connecting Penang Island with the Malay Peninsula

Expressway 36
- Penang Bridge; Jambatan Pulau Pinang 槟威大桥 பினாங்கு பாலம்
- Penang Bridge in red
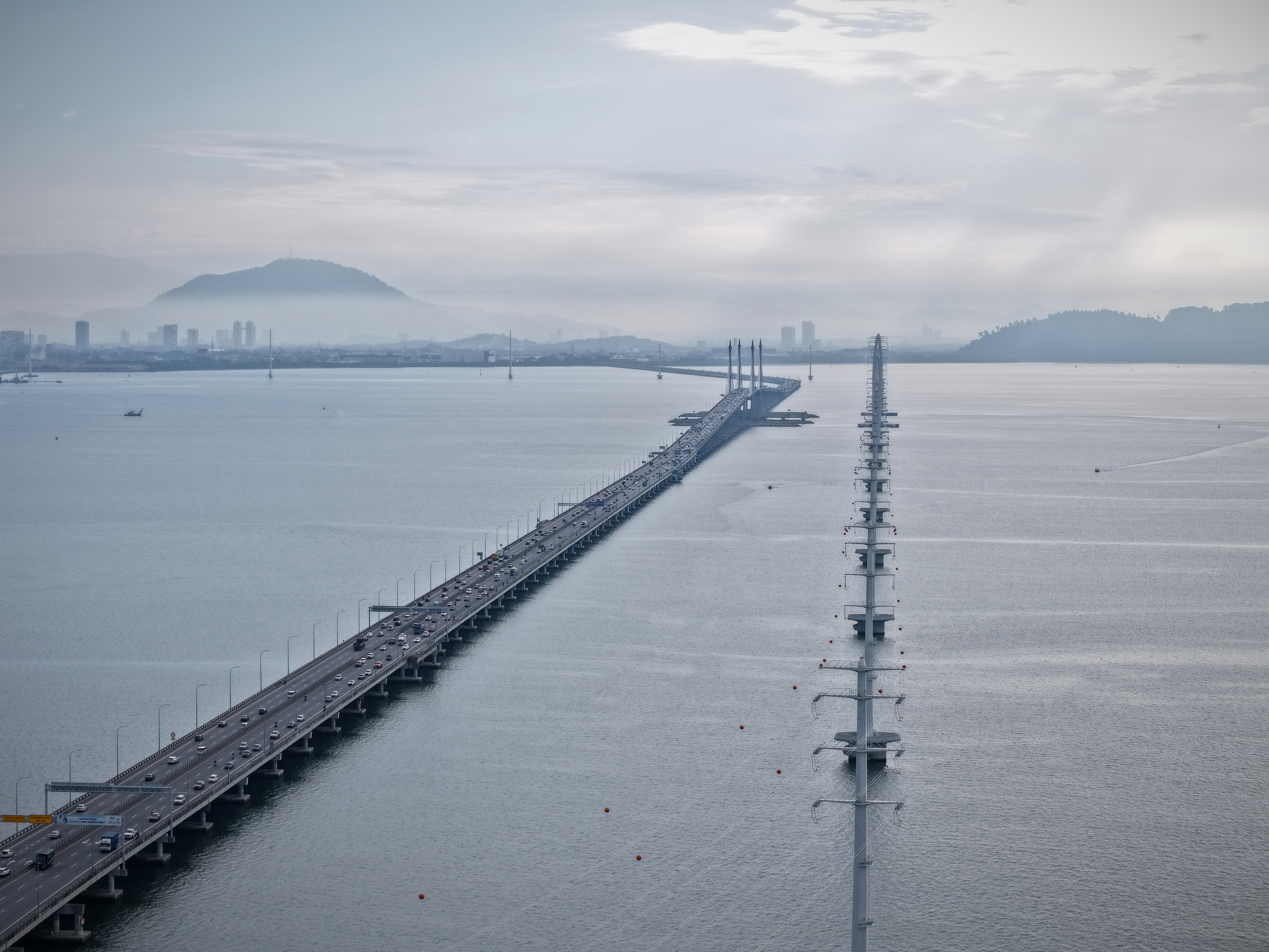

Route information
- Maintained by Malaysian Highway Authority
- Length: 13.5 km (8.4 mi)
- Existed: 1970s–present
- History: Opened 3 August 1985, inaugurated 14 September 1985

Major junctions
- East end: North–South Expressway Northern Route and FT 3112 Jalan Perusahan Perai at Perai, Seberang Perai
- West end: FT 3113 Tun Dr Lim Chong Eu Expressway and FT 6 Gelugor Highway at Gelugor, Penang Island

Location
- Country: Malaysia
- Primary destinations: George Town, Bayan Lepas, Perai, Butterworth, Bukit Mertajam

Highway system
- Highways in Malaysia; Expressways; Federal; State

Penang Bridge
- Coordinates: 5°21′14″N 100°21′09″E
- Carries: Motor vehicles
- Crosses: Penang Strait, Malaysia
- Locale: Penang
- Official name: Penang Bridge
- Maintained by: PLUS Expressways

Characteristics
- Design: Cable-stayed bridge Box girder bridge
- Total length: 13.5 km (8.4 mi)
- Width: --
- Longest span: 225 meters

History
- Designer: Primary; Government of Malaysia; Malaysian Highway Authority Secondary (South Korea) Hyundai Engineering and Construction Company (Korea) Ltd; United Engineers Malaysia Berhad
- Constructed by: Multiple: Primary Package 1 Loh & Loh Construction Co Ltd Package 2 Maraputra Sdn Bhd Package 3, 4 and 5 (South Korea) Hyundai Engineering & Construction Sykt. Pembinaan Hashbuddin (M) Sdn. Bhd. (Joint Venture) Lim Kar Bee & Sons Sdn. Bhd. (Joint Venture) United Engineers Malaysia Berhad Package 6 and 7 (South Korea) Hyundai Engineering & Construction Sykt Pembinaan Rahim & Sons Sdn. Bhd. Secondary Howard Needles & Tammen, Bergendoff Intl. Inc. SA/JK (SEA) (Consulting Engineer)
- Construction start: 12 April 1982; 44 years ago
- Construction end: 13 April 1985; 41 years ago
- Opened: 3 August 1985; 41 years ago
- Inaugurated: 14 September 1985; 41 years ago

Statistics
- Toll: Depends on vehicle type (island-bound only)

Location
- Interactive map of Penang Bridge

The E36 Penang Bridge is a 13.5-kilometre (8.4-mile) dual carriageway toll bridge and controlled-access highway in the Malaysian state of Penang. It connects Perai on the mainland side of the state with Gelugor on the island, crossing the Penang Strait. The bridge was the first and, until 2014, only road connection between the peninsula and the island. It is the second-longest bridge over water in Malaysia, with a length over water of 8.4 kilometres (5.2 miles).

Penang Bridge was inaugurated on 14 September 1985. The current concession holder and maintainer is PLUS Expressways. Penang Bridge Sdn Bhd was the concession holder before it was merged with the current concessionaire.

== History ==
=== Chronology ===
Date	Event
Early 1970s	The idea to build a bridge linking Seberang Perai to Penang Island was suggested by Prime Minister Abdul Razak Hussein and Chief Minister of Penang Lim Chong Eu.
23 July 1981	Works Minister Samy Vellu announced that Penang Bridge would be constructed using the cable-stayed concrete girders of San Francisco's Golden Gate Bridge instead of the steel-tied arch in the style of the Sydney Harbour Bridge. Speaking after his first cabinet meeting, Prime Minister Mahathir Mohamad said the government had picked a contractor for the job, though he declined to specify who it was.
1982	Construction of Penang Bridge officially began.
3 August 1985	Official opening of Penang Bridge by Prime Minister Mahathir.
14 September 1985	Penang Bridge is officially opened to traffic.

=== Bridge widening ===
When the bridge was initially constructed, the central span had six lanes, while the rest of the bridge had four. Widening of the entire bridge to six lanes began in January 2008 and was completed in late 2009.

== Features ==
Penang Bridge has an overall length of 13.5 km (8.4 mi): 8.4 km (5.2 mi) above water, 1.5 km (0.93 mi) on Penang Island, and 3.6 km (2.2 mi) in Prai. The 255 m (837 ft) main span is 33 m (108 ft) above water, held up by four 101.5 m (333 ft) towers. The carriageway has three lanes in each direction and a speed limit of 70–80 km/h (43–50 mph).

The bridge has an emergency lay-by equipped with an SOS phone. Traffic CCTV and VMS are installed at various locations. The bridge carries a Tenaga Nasional 132kV power cable.

== Tolls ==
Middle span of Penang Bridge

Since 1985, Penang Bridge has been tolled. Fees are charged only when entering from the mainland and travelling towards Penang Island. Since 1994, the tolls have been collected by a private concession company, Penang Bridge Sdn Bhd, which has become a member of PLUS Malaysia Berhad. Beginning 1 January 2019, toll collection for motorcyclists, which used to be RM1.40, was abolished for both Penang bridges.

=== Electronic toll collection ===
As part of an initiative to facilitate faster transactions at the Perai toll plaza, they have been exclusively conducted via electronic toll collection with the use of Touch 'n Go cards and SmartTAGs since 9 September 2015.

=== Fares ===
(Since 1 February 2020)

Class	Types of vehicles	Rate (in Malaysian ringgit (RM))
1	Motorcycles (vehicles with two axles and two wheels)	Free
2	Cars & motorcycles with sidecars (vehicles with two axles and three or four wheels (including station wagons and commercial vehicles))	5.74
3A	Vans and & buses (vehicles with two axles and four wheels (excluding lorries))	9.84
3B	Lorries (vehicles with two axles and four wheels (excluding vans and buses))	12.00
4A	Vans & buses (vehicles with two axles and five or six wheels (excluding trucks))	20.50
4B	Large trucks (vehicles with two axles and five or six wheels (excluding vans and buses))	25.00
5A	Buses (vehicles with three axles (excluding trucks))	36.90
5B	Large trucks (vehicles with three axles (excluding buses))	45.00
6	Large trucks (vehicles with four axles)	60.00
7	Large trucks (vehicles with five or more axles)	75.00

== Interchange list ==
The entire route is located in Penang.

District	Location	km	mi	Exit	Name	Destinations	Notes
Central Seberang Perai	Perai	0.0	0.0	161	Penang Bridge	North–South Expressway Northern Route / AH2 – Bukit Kayu Hitam, Alor Setar, Gerik East, Butterworth, Juru, Ipoh, Kuala Lumpur; FT 3112 (Malaysia Federal Route 3112) – Perai, Perai Industrial Area	
Central Seberang Perai	Perai			Penang Bridge toll plaza (barrier system; westbound only)			
Central Seberang Perai–Northeast Penang Island boundary				Penang Bridge over the Penang Strait			
Northeast Penang Island	Gelugor	13.5	8.4	—	—	FT 3113 (Tun Dr Lim Chong Eu Expressway) – Batu Maung, Bayan Lepas, Penang International Airport, George Town; FT 6 (Gelugor Highway) – Gelugor, Bayan Lepas, Penang International Airport, George Town	
1.000 mi = 1.609 km; 1.000 km = 0.621 mi

== Commemorative events ==
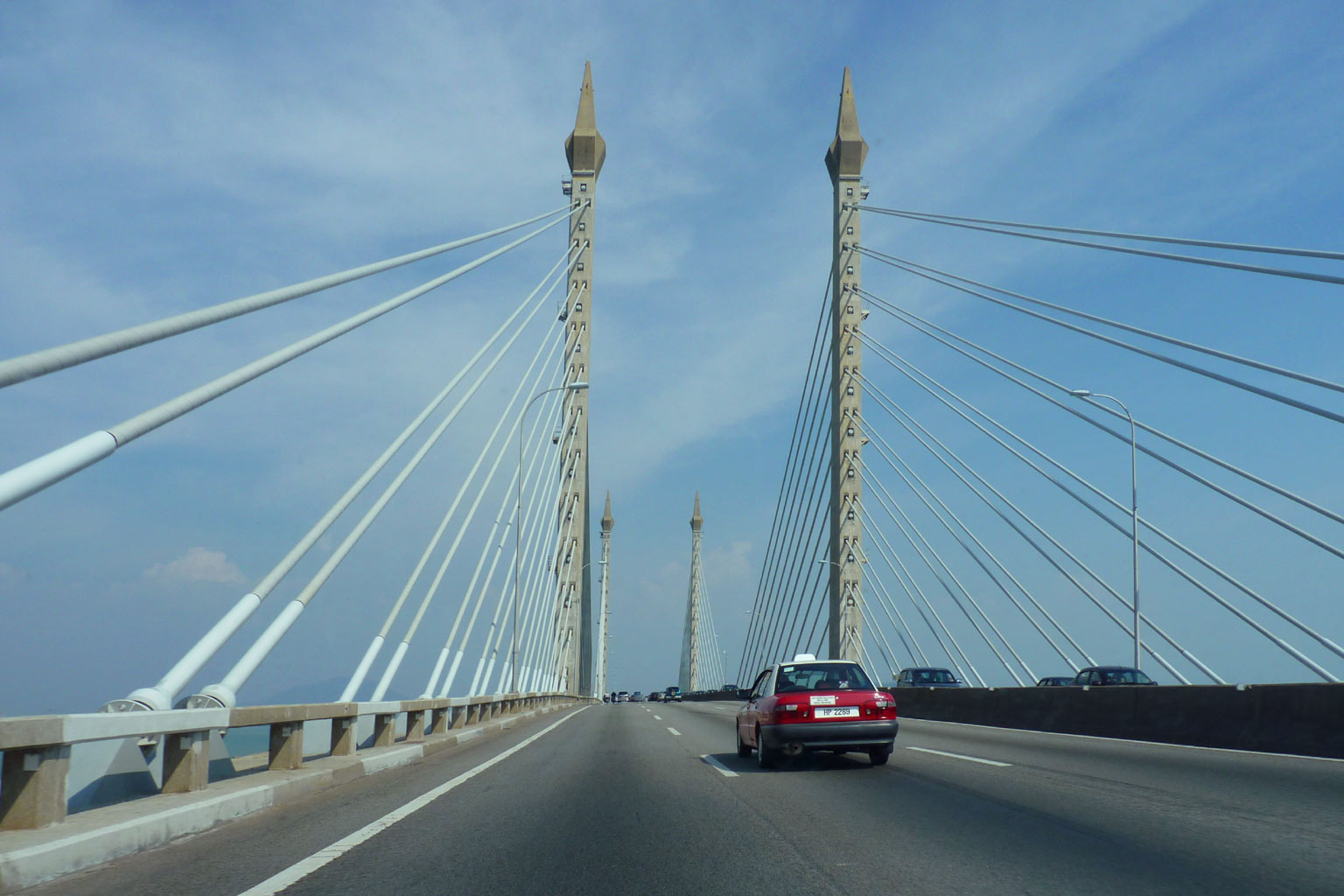
The main span of the bridge, viewed from the road deck

Commemorative postage stamps to mark the opening of Penang Bridge were issued by the Malaysian Postal Services Department (now Pos Malaysia) on 15 September 1985. The denominations for these stamps were 20 sen, 40 sen, and RM 1.00.

== Incidents and accidents ==
Over the years of its operation, the bridge has been a frequent spot for road accidents and suicides.

On 20 January 2019, two cars travelling mainland-bound collided, with one plunging into the Strait of Malacca. A search operation was launched for the submerged car, and the victim was later found dead.

== In popular culture ==
Penang Bridge became a subject matter in Lat's 1987 comic book Lat and Gang. On page 58, Lat illustrates various situations taking place on the bridge.

== See also ==
- North–South Expressway
- Tun Dr Lim Chong Eu Expressway
