= Southwest District (Penang) =

District in George Town, Penang, Malaysia

- District of Penang
- Daerah Barat Daya
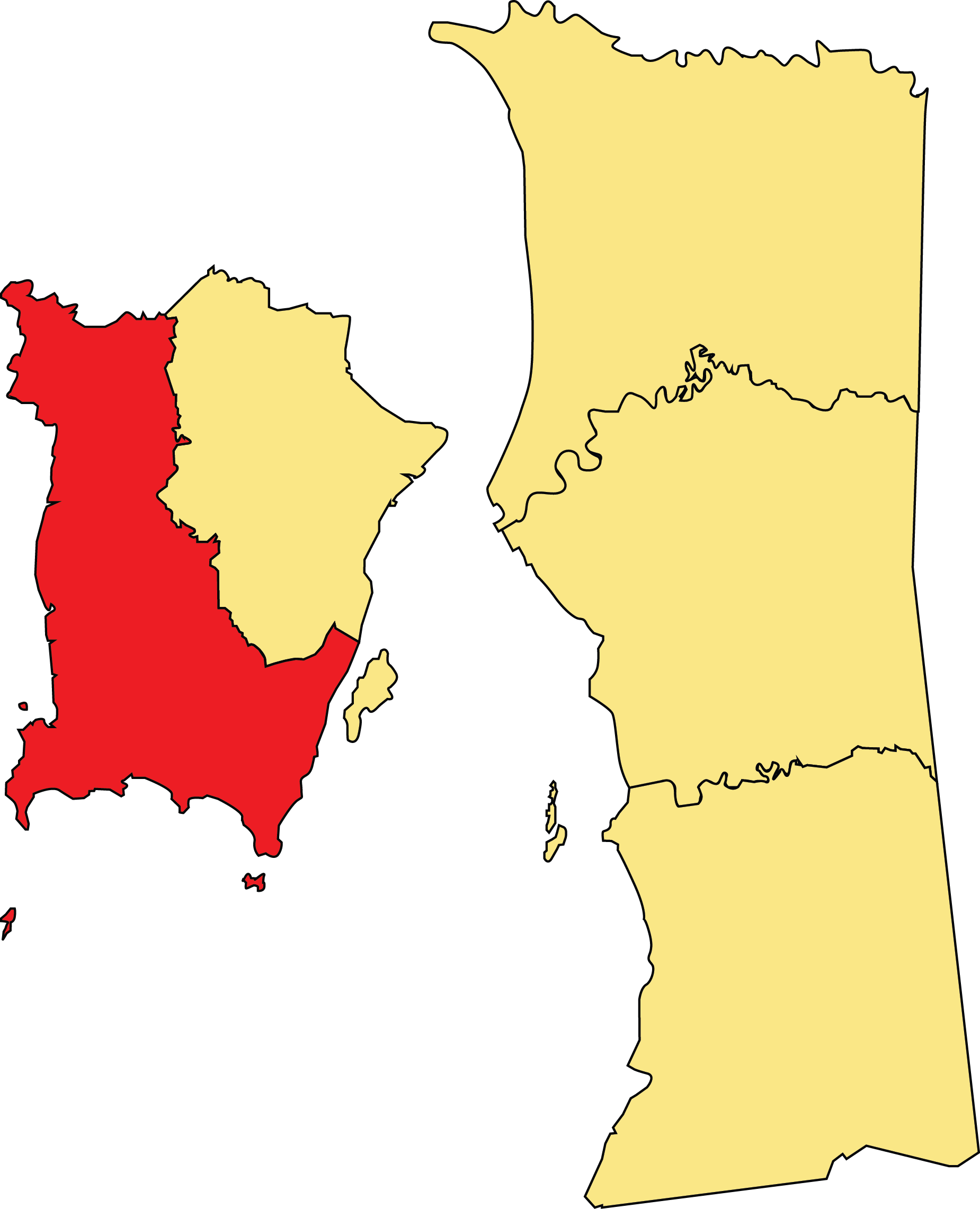
- Sortheast District within Penang
- Country: Malaysia
- State: Penang
- City: George Town
- Seat: Balik Pulau

Government
  - Local government: Penang Island City Council

Area
  - Total: 175.7 km^{2} (67.8 sq mi)

Population (2020)
  - Total: 237,854
  - Density: 1,353.8/km^{2} (3,506/sq mi)
- Postal code: 110xx–119xx
- Website: dbd.penang.gov.my

The Southwest District is a district in George Town within the Malaysian state of Penang. The district covers the southwestern half of Penang Island and borders the Northeast District. Both districts fall under the jurisdiction of the Penang Island City Council.

== History ==
In 1786, the British East India Company had taken control of Penang Island, establishing the city of George Town at the island's northeastern tip. For several decades since, the island was governed directly from George Town, with no administrative divisions on the island.

In 1888, a District and Land Office was established at Balik Pulau at the southwest of the island. Thus, the Southwest District was created, effectively dividing the island into two districts. Both districts first appeared in official maps dating back to the 1890s.

== Administrative divisions ==
The Southwest District is further divided into 23 subdivisions, officially known as mukims.

Population distribution by subdivisions
Subdivision	Population (2020)	Area (km^{2})	Population density (/km^{2})
Pantai Acheh	4,302	23	187
Teluk Bahang	2,531	20.4	124
Bukit Sungai Pinang	1,919	6.2	310
Batu Hitam	3,574	10	357
Bukit Balik Pulau	1,282	5.2	247
Pondok Upih	7,679	8.9	863
Bukit Genting	1,509	6.1	247
Bukit Pasir Panjang	1,444	5.6	258
Bukit Gemuruh	17,379	9.6	1,810
Bukit Relau	18,755	11.5	1,631
Teluk Kumbar	21,481	6.8	3,159
Bayan Lepas	130,455	31.9	4,089
Sungai Pinang	2,323	2	1,162
Sungai Rusa	2,817	4.2	671
Permatang Pasir	2,439	6	407
Bagan Air Hitam	3,382	3.6	939
Titi Teras	2,394	3.6	665
Kongsi	2,730	1	2,730
Kampung Paya	3,981	1	3,981
Sungai Burung	1,523	2.9	525
Pulau Betong	1,551	3.9	398
Dataran Genting	2,179	2.2	990
Balik Pulau	109	0.1	1,090

== See also ==
- North Seberang Perai District
- Central Seberang Perai District
- South Seberang Perai District
