= Northeast District (Penang) =

District in George Town, Penang, Malaysia

- District of Penang
- Daerah Timur Laut
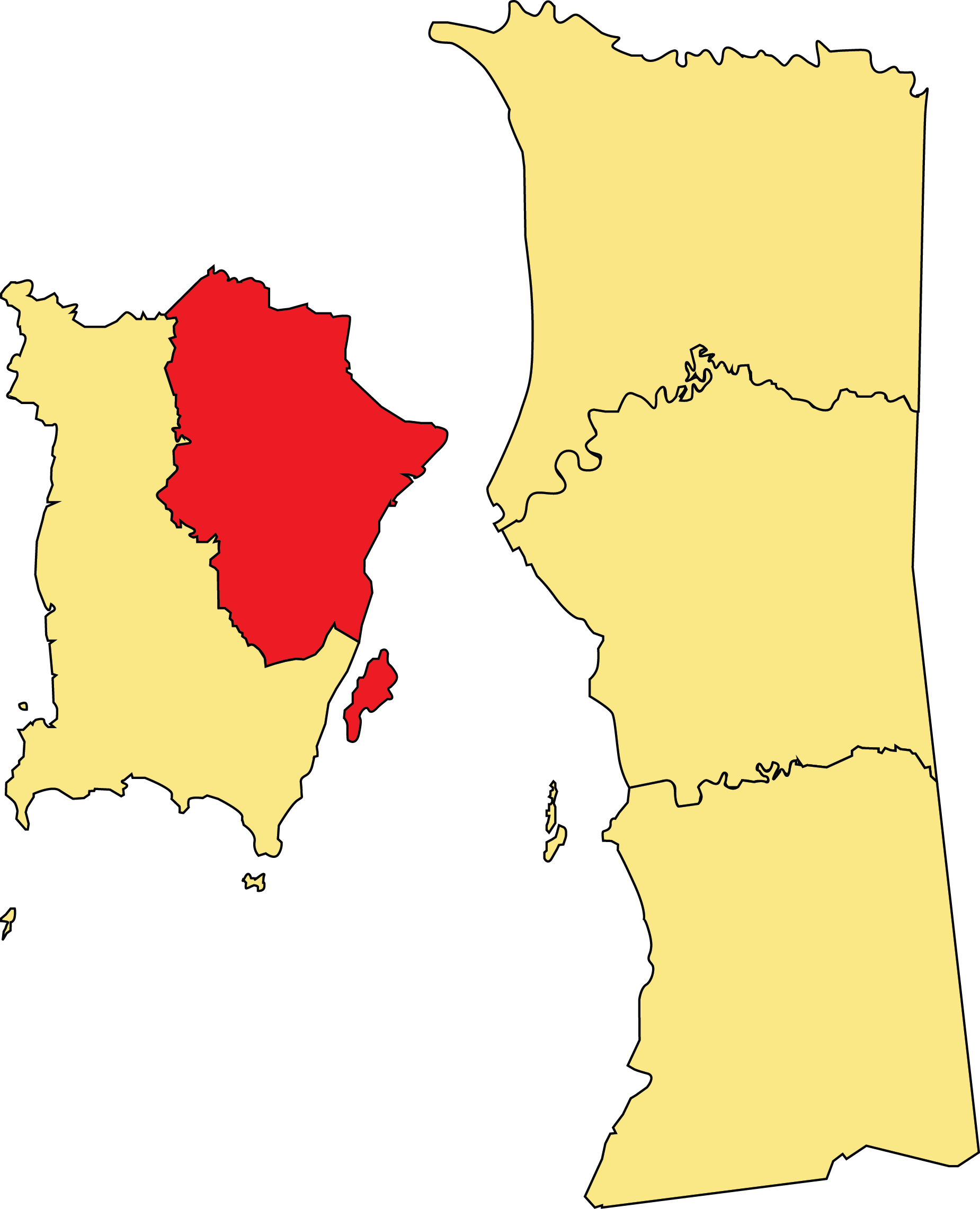
- Northeast District within Penang
- Country: Malaysia
- State: Penang
- City: George Town
- Seat: Central George Town

Government
  - Local government: Penang Island City Council

Area
  - Total: 129.6 km^{2} (50.0 sq mi)

Population (2020)
  - Total: 556,575
  - Density: 4,294.6/km^{2} (11,123/sq mi)
- Postal code: 100xx–108xx; 111xx–118xx
- Website: dtl.penang.gov.my

The Northeast District is a district in George Town within the Malaysian state of Penang. The district covers the northeastern half of Penang Island, including downtown George Town, and borders the Southwest District. Both districts fall under the jurisdiction of the Penang Island City Council.

== History ==
In 1786, the British East India Company had gained control of Penang Island, establishing the city of George Town at the island's northeastern tip. In the following decades, the entirety of the island was governed directly from George Town.

In 1888, the Southwest District office was established at Balik Pulau at the southwest of the island, thus dividing the island into the Northeast and Southwest districts. Both districts first appeared in official maps dating back to the 1890s.

== Administrative divisions ==
The Northeast District is further divided into 15 subdivisions, officially known as mukims.

Population distribution by subdivisions
Subdivision	Population (2020)	Area (km^{2})	Population density (/km^{2})
Paya Terubong	226,712	32.7	6,933
Bukit Paya Terubong	1,998	4.9	408
Mukim 15	13	4.8	3
Mukim 16	1,408	3.7	381
Mukim 17	2,579	25	103
Mukim 18	18,217	9.2	1,980
Ayer Itam	16,974	1.8	9,430
Batu Ferringhi	9,046	2.3	3,933
Penang Hill	332	3.6	92
Gelugor	18,662	2.9	6,435
City centre	158,336	25.5	6,209
Jelutong	63,507	4.4	14,433
Tanjong Bungah	14,271	2.8	5,097
Tanjong Pinang	11,970	4.5	2,660
Tanjong Tokong	12,550	1.5	8,367

== See also ==
- North Seberang Perai District
- Central Seberang Perai District
- South Seberang Perai District
