= Penang Island =

Main island of the Malaysian state of Penang

Native name: Pulau Pinang
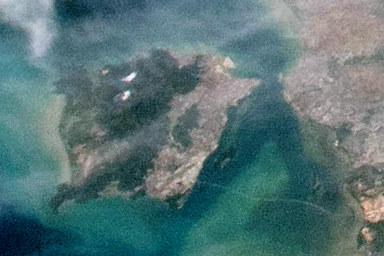
- Penang Island viewed from the ISS
- Penang Island is the main constituent island of Penang

Geography
- Location: Strait of Malacca (west); Penang Strait (east)
- Coordinates: 5.37°N 100.26°E
- Archipelago: Malay Archipelago
- Area: 295 km^{2} (114 sq mi)
- Highest point: Penang Hill

Administration
- Malaysia
- State: Penang
- City: George Town

Demographics
- Population: 794,313 (2020)
- Pop. density: 2,596/km^{2} (6724/sq mi)

Penang Island is the main constituent island of the Malaysian state of Penang. It is located off the western coast of Peninsular Malaysia by the Malacca Strait, with the Penang Strait separating the island from Seberang Perai on the mainland. The 295 km^{2} (114 sq mi) island makes up approximately 28% of Penang's total land mass and is home to about 45% of the state's population as of 2020. The entire island falls under the city of George Town, which also administers the surrounding islets.

== Geography ==
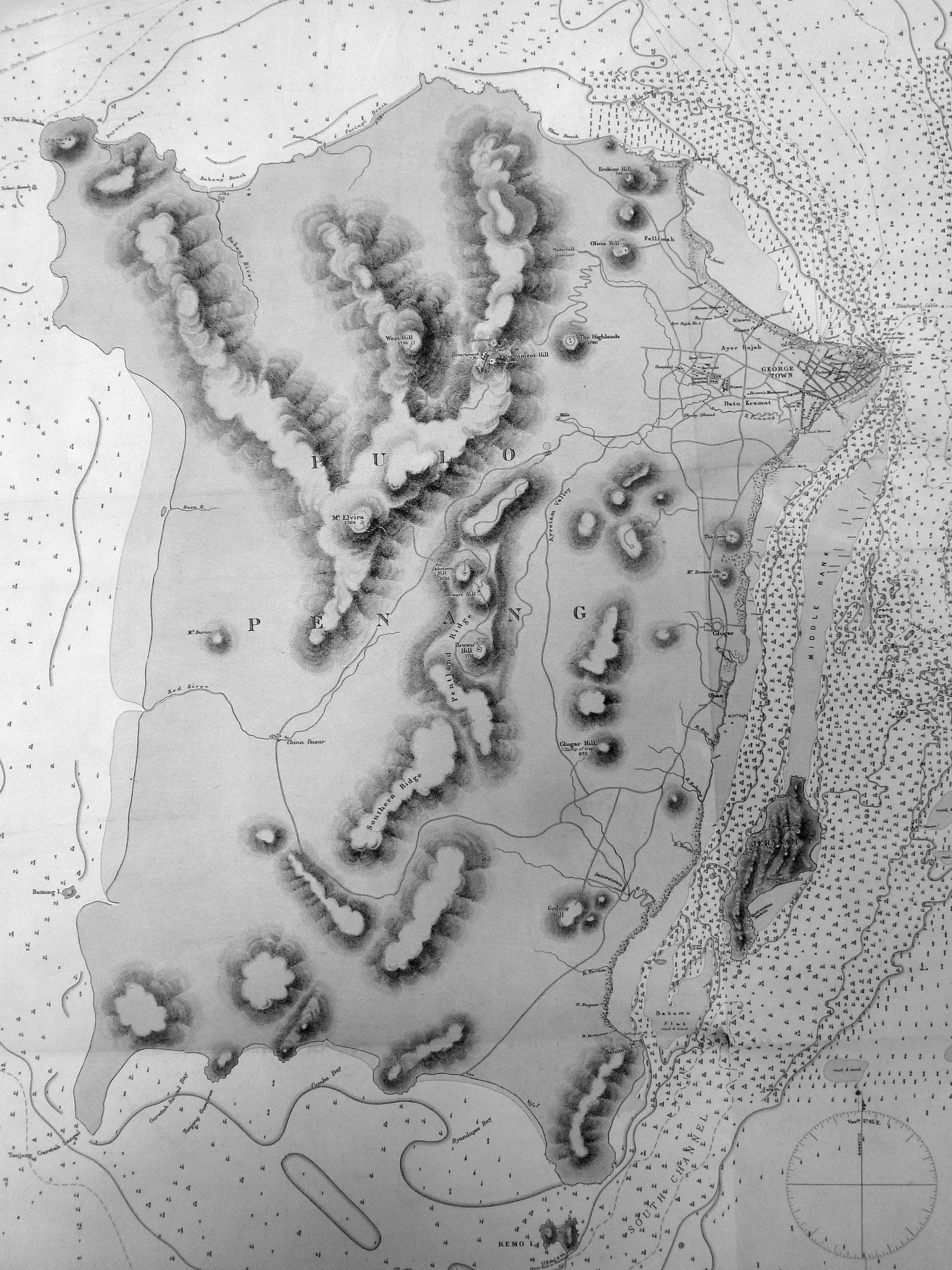
Map of Penang Island surveyed by Commander F C P Vereker in 1884

With an area of 295 km^{2} (114 mi^{2}), Penang is the fourth largest island wholly in Malaysia, after Banggi Island, Bruit Island and Langkawi Island. It is also the most populated island city in the country, with a population of 794,313 as of 2020.

The island's terrain is irregular and consists of a hilly and mostly forested interior. The coastal plains are narrow, with the most expansive one being at the northeastern cape. It was at this cape where the early development of George Town began, eventually reaching down the eastern seaboard. Mangrove swamps are prevalent along the western shoreline of the island. Combined with the hills at the centre of the island, urbanisation along the western half of the island has been limited.

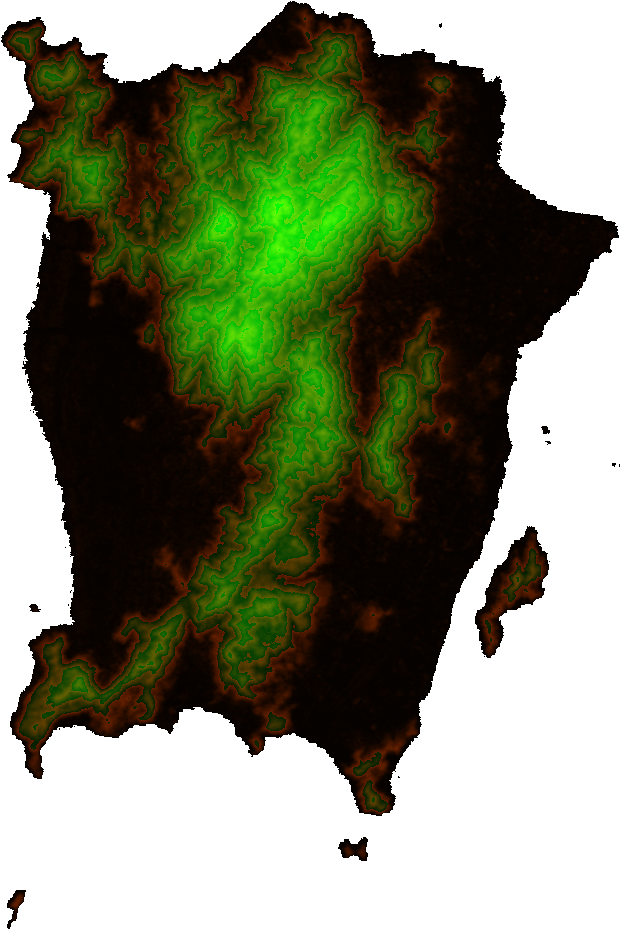
A heightmap of Penang Island and surrounding islands plotted from ASTER GDEM data and coloured to allow easy extraction of height data in metres

Standing at 833 m (2,733 ft), Penang Hill, at the centre of the island, is the highest point in Penang. The hilly centre of the island serves as a crucial water catchment area and is also home to rainforests that have been around for over 130 million years. In 2021, the 12,481-hectare (30,840-acre) Penang Hill Biosphere Reserve was inducted into UNESCO's World Network of Biosphere Reserves as a recognition of the biodiversity and importance of Penang Hill as a protected forest reserve.

Due to land scarcity, land reclamation projects have been undertaken at high-demand areas such as Tanjong Tokong, Jelutong, Batu Maung and Gurney Drive. In 2023, a massive reclamation project to build the 920-hectare (2,300-acre) Silicon Island, envisioned as a new hub for high tech manufacturing and commerce, commenced off the island's southern coastline. This is in addition to the creation of Andaman Island off the island's north coast. Meanwhile, the shoreline off Gurney Drive is also being transformed into Gurney Bay, intended as a "new iconic waterfront destination for Penang".

The island is connected with the mainland by two road bridges. The Penang Bridge begins at Gelugor on the island and ends at Perai on the mainland, while the Sultan Abdul Halim Muadzam Shah Bridge links Batu Maung with Batu Kawan on the mainland.
