= Penang Bridge International Marathon =

Annual race in Malaysia held since the 1980s

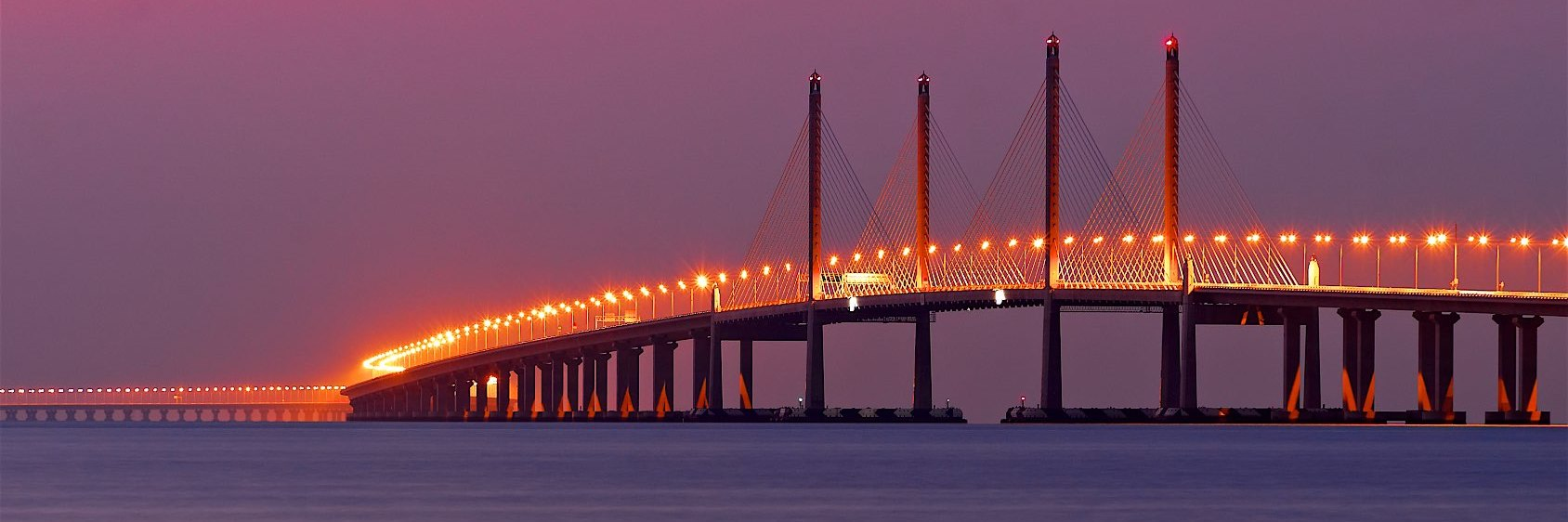
- Second Penang Bridge
- Date: Varies (Currently in December)
- Location: Penang, Malaysia
- Event type: Road (mostly on a bridge)
- Distance: Marathon
- Established: 1982 (44 years ago) (Note: The Association of Road Racing Statisticians believes 1982 was the inaugural year, but does not have any details regarding the winners of that year. Also, the first time the run was held on the bridge was 1986, since the bridge was completed in 1985.)
- Course records: Men: 2:19:47.1 (2014) (Kenya) Alex Melly; Women: 2:46:44.9 (2017) (Kenya) Margaret Wangui
- Website: Penang Bridge Marathon
- Participants: 25,000 (all races) (2019)

The Penang Bridge International Marathon (Malay: Maraton Antarabangsa Jambatan Pulau Pinang) or Penang Bridge Marathon, abbreviated as PBIM, is an annual marathon event held at Penang Bridge from 1986 until 2023 and at Sultan Abdul Halim Muadzam Shah Bridge in 2014 and since 2024 in Penang, Malaysia. It is organised by Penang State Tourism Development office (PETACH) since 2008 and fully supported by the Penang State Government. During the competition, participants usually run over the bridge.

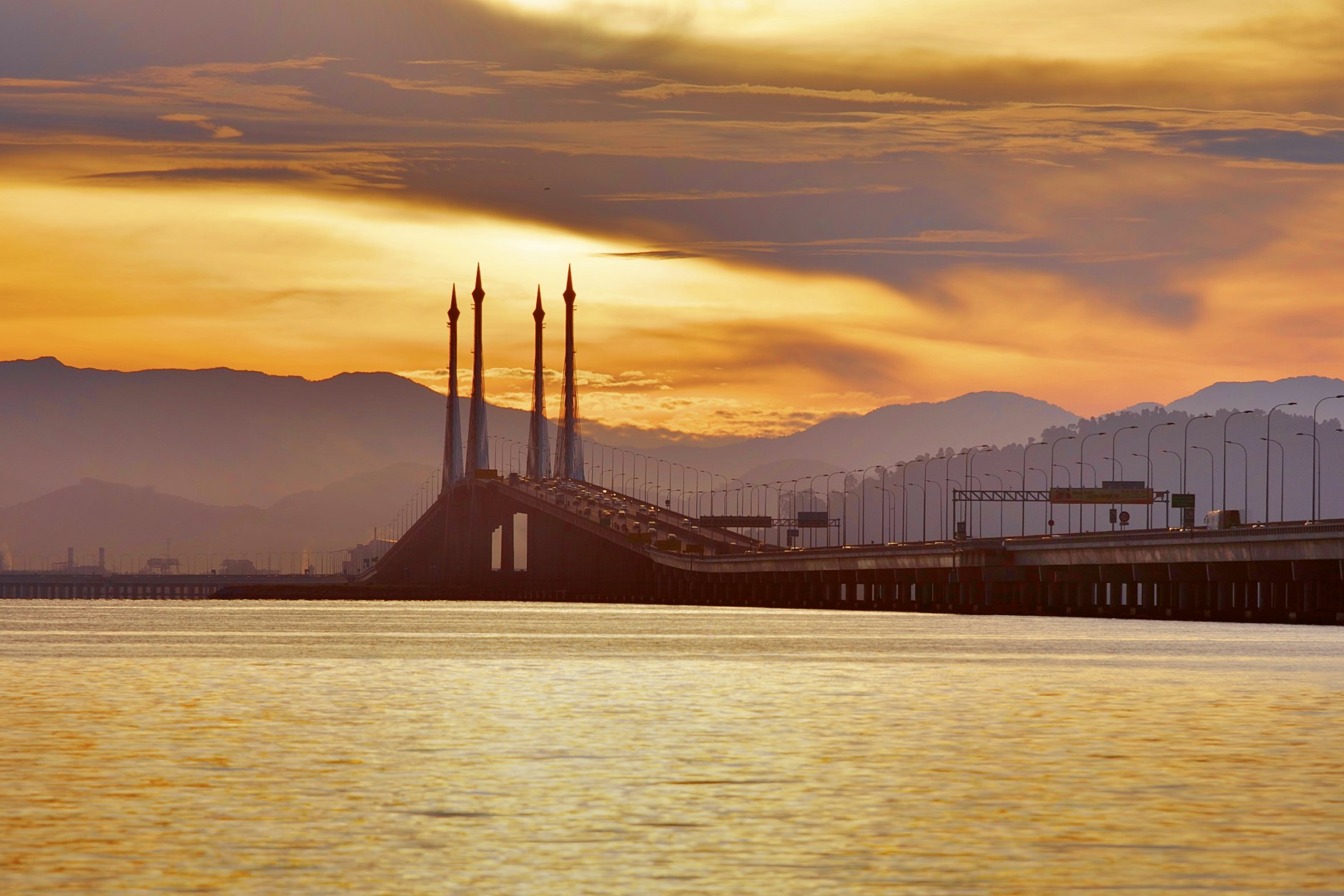
Penang Bridge, former venue of the Bridge Marathon race.

== History ==
=== Penang International Marathon (1982–1994) ===
The event's history started in 1982 as a road race from Esplanade to Gurney Drive named the Penang International Marathon. It was jointly organised by the Penang Amateur Athletic Association (PAAA) with Hong Kong flag carrier Cathay Pacific for the first four editions and its Malaysian counterpart Malaysia Airlines for the remaining editions.

=== Penang Bridge Run (1986–2003) ===
With the completion of Penang Bridge in 1985, a competition named the Penang Bridge Run was held there from 1986 until 2003. In its early years, the Bridge Run only had half and quarter marathon categories. It was not until 1998 when the full marathon category was added and the event was renamed the International Penang Bridge Run (IPBR). The competition was jointly organised by the Malaysian Highway Authority and the New Straits Times.

=== Penang Bridge International Marathon (2006–present) ===
In 2006, after a break for a number of years, the Penang Bridge International Marathon was revived as "a combination" of the Penang International Marathon, which was last held in 1999 and the International Penang Bridge Run. Between 2006 and 2007, the marathon race was jointly organised by the Highway Authority and the Penang Island Municipal Council (now Penang Island City Council), before it was fully taken over by the State Government the following year.

In 2020, the competition was rebranded with the introduction of the new logo as well as the tagline "The Asian Challenge", reflecting the vision of making it into an internationally acknowledged marathon run event.

In 2014 and since 2024, the events are held at Sultan Abdul Halim Muadzam Shah Bridge (completed in 2013), which is also known as the Penang Second Bridge.

=== Controversies ===
In 2016, the event was rescheduled in order to accommodate requests from the parents of schoolchildren, causing trouble for runners who had already booked flights for the race.

In 2017, there were a number of issues, including issuing shirts of incorrect sizes, running out of water, handing out expired chocolate bars, delaying the reporting of results, (Note: Runners complained that full results had not been posted by evening, with one runner complaining that the results had incorrectly stated that the runner had "withdrawn during [the] race".) and denying some podium finishers an onstage presentation. (Note: One 17-year-old girl, who placed second in her category, was left "sob[bing] uncontrollably" when she learned that she had to collect her prize at a booth.) In addition, some runners waited for two hours for finisher medals, and over three hours for food.

=== Cancellations ===
In 2018, the 10k race was cancelled for the first time "due to heavy rain and lightning", with all registered runners given finisher medals as a consolation. (Note: Yeoh Soon Hin, the organizing chairman, stated that the 10k race could not be postponed as the bridge had to be reopened by a certain time. The full and half marathons, however, had begun hours earlier.)

The 2020 in-person edition of the race was cancelled due to the coronavirus pandemic, with all entries automatically transferred to 2021, and all registrants given the option of transferring their entry to another runner.

== Course ==
External image
- Course map of full marathon in 2019

From 2008 until 2023, the Penang Bridge International Marathon ran on a loop course that begins and ends at the outdoor car park of the Queensbay Mall. From 1998 until 2007, the race began at Gelugor National Primary School and ended at Universiti Sains Malaysia main campus' ground in Gelugor.

The course first enters Tun Dr Lim Chong Eu Expressway, which runs along the eastern coast of Penang Island, with runners first running south and then back up north before turning back south to cross the 13.5 km (8.4 mi) bridge. Shortly after crossing the bridge, runners turn around in Perai and run across the bridge again, before heading south to finish back at the Queensbay Mall.

In 2014 and since 2024, the race is held along the Sultan Abdul Halim Muadzam Shah Bridge, also known as the second bridge. The starting and finishing points of the 2014 race were located at Batu Maung Interchange Grounds with turn around in Batu Kawan, while those of races since 2024 are located at ASPEN Vision City in Batu Kawan with turn around in Batu Maung.

Year	Bridge	Start	Finish	Turning point
1998–2003; 2006–2007	Penang Bridge	Gelugor National Primary School	Universiti Sains Malaysia Main Campus, Gelugor	Perai
2008–2013; 2015–2023	Penang Bridge	Queensbay Mall, Bayan Lepas		Perai
2014	Sultan Abdul Halim Muadzam Shah Bridge	Batu Maung Interchange Ground, Batu Maung		Batu Kawan
2024–present	Sultan Abdul Halim Muadzam Shah Bridge	ASPEN Vision City, Batu Kawan		Batu Maung

== Other races ==
The Penang Bridge International Marathon also incorporates a half-marathon event and a 10-km run event. The competition also had a fun run event which was introduced in 2007, but it was removed in 2018 as part of rebranding exercise.

== Winners ==
=== Penang International Marathon ===
Key: Course record

Year	Men's winner	Time	Women's winner	Time	Rf.
5 September 1982	Masaaki Chiba (JPN)	2:24:57	Winnie Ng (HKG)	2:55:52	
1983	Masaaki Chiba (JPN)	2:22:49	Rita Fung-fan Wong (HKG)	3:04:01	
1984	Budd Coates (USA)	2:29:59	Leslie Watson (GBR)	3:02:43	
1985	Hiroaki Oyagi (JPN)	2:27:52	Rita Fung-fan Wong (HKG)	3:01:08	
1986	Shin Yen-ho (TPE)	2:28:14	Satsuko Hanafusa (JPN)	2:58:00	
6 September 1987	Jimmy de la Torre (PHI)	2:29:52	Satsuko Hanafusa (JPN)	2:54:58	
1988	Doug Kurtis (USA)	2:29:40	Satsuko Hanafusa (JPN)	3:10:24	
1989	Amaram Raman (MYS)	2:35:09	Sunita Godara (IND)	3:03:02	
1990	Trevor Scott (AUS)	2:34:13	Sunita Godara (IND)	3:00:56	
1991	Hsu Gi-sheng (TPE)	2:29:29	Sunita Godara (IND)	3:01:29	
1992	Trevor Scott (AUS)	2:31:15	Sunita Godara (IND)	2:55:06	
1993	Daniel Shungea (KEN)	2:26:12	Karen Moir (AUS)	2:55:12	
1994	Daniel Shungea (KEN)	2:28:59	Franca Fiacconi (ITA)	2:56:49	

=== International Penang Bridge Run ===
Date	Men's winner	Time	Women's winner	Time	Rf.
Open category
31 May 1998	Jirattigarn Boonma (THA)	2:32:30	Devamani Sothie (MAS)	3:06:28	
30 May 1999	Jirattigarn Boonma (THA)	2:33:33	Devamani Sothie (MAS)	3:13:13	
25 June 2000	Jirattigarn Boonma (THA)	2:37:08	Devamani Sothie (MAS)	3:11:15	
3 June 2001	Data not available				
2 June 2002	Data not available				
8 June 2003	John Kelai (KEN)	2:29:56	Yuan Yufang (MAS)	3:09:19	
—	not held from 2004 to 2005				
Veteran category
31 May 1998	Yuji Watanabe (JPN)	2:50:32	Kesinee Unsaard (THA)	3:22:59	
30 May 1999	Lee Kar Lun (HKG)	2:42:18	Kesinee Unsaard (THA)	3:25:48	
25 June 2000	Lee Kar Lun (HKG)	2:54:28			
Malaysian category (Open)
25 June 2000	Mohammad Arumugam Abdullah	2:42:59	Devamani Sothie	3:11:15	
Malaysian category (Veteran)
25 June 2000	R Ratha Krishnan	2:58:13			

=== Penang Bridge International Marathon ===
Date	Men's winner	Time	Women's winner	Time	Rf.
Open category
30 July 2006	Samuel Tarus (KEN)	2:37:11	Devamani Sothie (MYS)	3:21:02	
24 June 2007	Sammy Kurgat (KEN)	2:26:00	Devamani Sothie (MYS)	3:16:02	
16 November 2008	Benjamin Metto (KEN)	2:24:50	Doris Chepchumba (KEN)	3:14:04	
22 November 2009	Kennedy Melly (KEN)	2:23:55	Doris Chepchumba (KEN)	3:08:37	
21 November 2010	Alex Melly (KEN)	2:24:30	Rose Chesire (KEN)	2:59:14	
20 November 2011	Charles Kigen (KEN)	2:21:56.9	Margaret Wangui (KEN)	3:06:38.6	
18 November 2012	Isaac Kimaiyo (KEN)	2:31:02	Monika Fischer (GER)	3:25:10	
17 November 2013	James Cherutich (KEN)	2:24:42.8	Naomi Wangui (KEN)	2:53:03.7	
16 November 2014	Alex Melly (KEN)	2:19:47.1	Fridah Lodepa (KEN)	3:04:09.6	
22 November 2015	Julius Seurei (KEN)	2:22:04.9	Fridah Lodepa (KEN)	2:47:46.2	
27 November 2016	Bernard Muthoni (KEN)	2:27:42.0	Margaret Wangui (KEN)	2:53:07.3	
26 November 2017	Josphat Too (KEN)	2:23:30.2	Margaret Wangui (KEN)	2:46:44.9	
25 November 2018	James Tallam (KEN)	2:24:22.0	Peninah Kigen (KEN)	2:46:52.9	
24 November 2019	Moses Kiptoo (KEN)	2:20:05	Peninah Kigen (KEN)	2:51:50	
–	Cancelled due to coronavirus pandemic from 2020 to 2021				
11 December 2022	Geoffrey Birgen (KEN)	2:14:35	Peninah Kigen (KEN)	2:46:07	
17 December 2023	Anderson Saitoti Seroi (KEN)	2:18:43	Truphena Chepchirchir (KEN)	2:44:41	
15 December 2024	Moses Mbugua Gaikarira (KEN)	2:18:34	Rita Jeptoo Busienei (KEN)	2:40:01	
14 December 2025	Anderson Saitoti Seroi (KEN)	2:19:42	Eunice Nyawira Muchiri (KEN)	2:37:32	
13 December 2026	Next event				
Veteran category
16 November 2008	Lautredoux Jean-Pierre (FRA)	2:40:06	Not contested		
22 November 2009	Lautredoux Jean-Pierre (FRA)	2:35:26	Not contested		
21 November 2010	Phillip Chirchir Lagat (KEN)	2:45:36	Not contested		
20 November 2011	Phillip Chirchir Lagat (KEN)	2:45:27	Not contested		
18 November 2012	Phillip Chirchir Lagat (KEN)	2:58:07	Monika Fischer (GER)	3:25:10	
17 November 2013	Phillip Chirchir Lagat (KEN)	2:50:55	Deborah Chinn (USA)	3:23:20	
16 November 2014	Julius Rotich (KEN)	2:38:01	Margaret Njuguna (KEN)	2:58:41	
22 November 2015	Caleb Chemweno (KEN)	2:30:07	Margaret Njuguna (KEN)	3:08:06	
27 November 2016	Hillary Koech (KEN)	2:33:36	Yuan Yu Fang (MAS)	3:25:45	
26 November 2017	Joseph Mwangi Ngare (KEN)	2:30:45	Julia Wangui Njari (KEN)	3:00:10	
25 November 2018	Joseph Mwangi Ngare (KEN)	2:34:37	Julia Wangui Njari (KEN)	2:58:30	
24 November 2019	Joseph Mwangi Ngare (KEN)	2:29:58	Margaret Njuguna (KEN)	2:52:19	
–	Cancelled due to coronavirus pandemic from 2020 to 2021				
11 December 2022	Joseph Mwangi Ngare (KEN)	2:28:29	Margaret Njuguna (KEN)	2:58:30	
17 December 2023	Joseph Mwangi Ngare (KEN)	2:24:16	Jane Wanjiru Muriuki (KEN)	2:58:23	
15 December 2024	Geoffrey Birgen (KEN)	2:24:31	Mercy Jelimo Too (KEN)	2:59:06	
14 December 2025	Peter Kipleting Peter (KEN)	2:23:39	Peris Jepkorir (KEN)	2:48:06	
13 December 2026	Next event				
Malaysian category
20 November 2011	Shahruddin Hashim	2:54:46	Cheah Meei Meei	3:46:43	
18 November 2012	Shahruddin Hashim	2:49:27	Ling Mee Eng	3:51:19	
17 November 2013	Shahruddin Hashim	2:46:14	Ewe Bee Hong	3:45:12	
16 November 2014	Fabian Osmond Daimon	2:47:03	Ng Sun Nee	3:38:12	
22 November 2015	Muhaizar Mohammad	2:42:48	Loh Chooi Fern	3:29:16	
27 November 2016	Nik Fakaruddin Ismail	2:40:03	Yuan Yu Fang	3:25:45	
26 November 2017	Nik Fakaruddin Ismail	2:43:34	Loh Chooi Fern	3:28:14	
25 November 2018	Nik Fakaruddin Ismail	2:45:54	Loh Chooi Fern	3:17:30	
24 November 2019	Nik Fakaruddin Ismail	2:40:53	Noor Amelia Musa	3:18:51	
–	Cancelled due to coronavirus pandemic from 2020 to 2021				
11 December 2022	Poo Vasanthan Subramaniam	2:37:59	Noor Amelia Musa	3:16:21	
17 December 2023	Nik Fakaruddin Ismail	2:43:57	Noor Amelia Musa	3:14:36	
15 December 2024	Muhamad Haziq Hamzah	2:46:19	Tiffany Lee Siok Chin	3:09:06	
14 December 2025	Muhamad Haziq Hamzah	2:38:30	Noor Amelia Musa	3:14:17	
13 December 2026	Next event				
