= Batu Kawan =

- Suburb of Seberang Perai
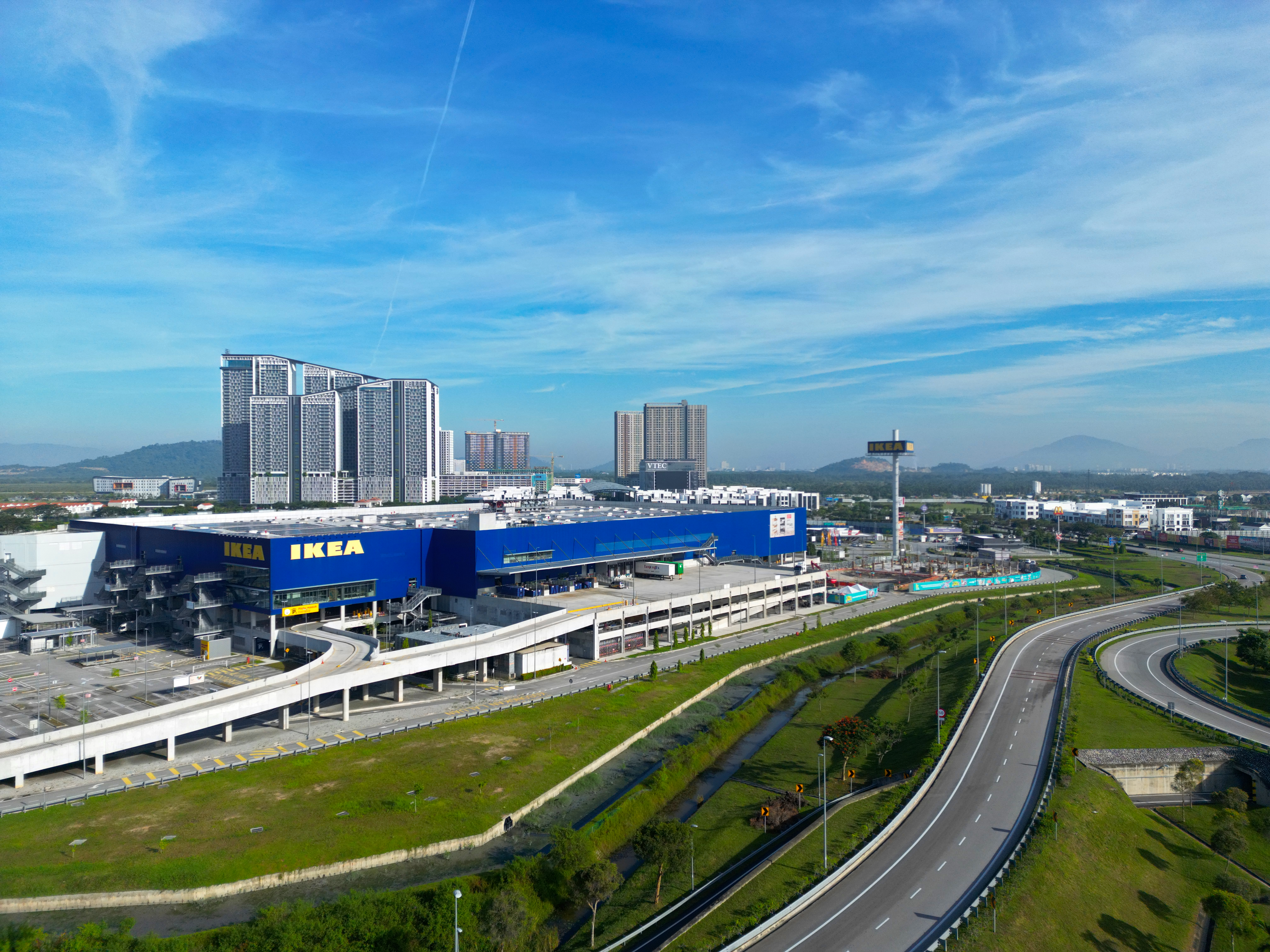
- Interactive map of Batu Kawan
- Location within Seberang Perai in Penang
- Coordinates: 5°13′52.32″N 100°26′38.97″E
- Country: Malaysia
- State: Penang
- City: Seberang Perai
- District: South Seberang Perai

Area
  - Total: 29.5 km^{2} (11.4 sq mi)

Population (2020)
  - Total: 11,409
  - Density: 387/km^{2} (1,000/sq mi)

Demographics
  - Ethnic groups: 60.3% Bumiputera; 60.1% Malay; 0.1% indigenous groups from Sabah and Sarawak; 15.2% Chinese; 18.5% Indian; 0.3% Other ethnicities; 5.7% Non-citizens
- Time zone: UTC+8 (MST)
  - Summer (DST): Not observed
- Postal code: 141xx

Batu Kawan is an island and newly developing suburb of Seberang Perai in the Malaysian state of Penang. It is geographically separated from the rest of Seberang Perai by the Jawi and Tengah rivers. As of 2020, Batu Kawan contained a population of 11,409.

Long considered a quiet agricultural backwater, Batu Kawan is undergoing rapid development, which was sparked by the completion of the Second Penang Bridge that connects the town with Batu Maung on Penang Island in 2014. A host of multinational firms, including Boston Scientific, Western Digital Corporation, Bose Corporation, Dexcom and Bosch, have set up manufacturing plants within the Batu Kawan Industrial Park. In addition, Batu Kawan is home to Design Village, Malaysia's largest outlet mall.

Among the ongoing developments within Batu Kawan are an IKEA store, Aspen Vision City and Utropolis, the latter of which is expected to serve as a hub for tertiary education.

== Housing ==
House	Height
Sensasi Residence A	28 Floors
Sensasi Residence B	28 Floors
Vertu Resort Tower A	29 Floors
Vertu Resort Tower B	34 Floors
Vertu Resort Tower C	34 Floors
Vertu Resort Tower D	39 Floors
Vertu Resort Tower E	42 Floors
Suasana Residence	39 Floors
Sinaran Residence Tower A	36 Floors
Sinaran Residence Tower B	37 Floors
Vivo Executive Tower A	48 Floors
Vivo Executive Tower B	48 Floors
Vivo Executive Tower C	48 Floors
Versa Residence Tower A	-- Floors
Versa Residence Tower B	-- Floors
Savana Residence	34 Floors
Sensasi Residence	46 Floors
Anggun Residence	30 Floors
Duduk Residence A	28 Floors
Duduk Residence B	28 Floors
Ashton Eco Horizon	2 Floors
Camdon Eco Horizon	2 Floors
Beldon Eco Horizon	2 Floors
Dawson Eco Horizon	2 Floors
Dedaun Bandar Cassia	2-4 Floors
Crescentia Bandar Cassia	1-3 Floors
Villa Tanjung Permai	1-2 Floors
Taman Intan Cempaka	1-2 Floors
Taman Intan Delima	1 Floor
Taman Cassia Cempaka	2 Floors
Suria Apartment A	11 Floors
Suria Apartment B	13 Floors
Suria Apartment C	18 Floors

== Commercial ==
Place	Purpose
IKEA Batu Kawan (Klippa Mall)	IKEA Batu Kawan, TMG Mart, Banks, Clothing Store, Restaurants, Entertainment
Vervea	Restaurants, Offices, Barber, Clinics, Healthcare, Pharmacy, Caltex
Borealis	Jaya Grocer, Banks, Healthcare, Restaurants, Offices, Hair Saloon, Clinics, Pharmacy
Design Village	Urban Pantry, Banks, Clothing Store, Restaurants, Entertainment, Money Changer, Hair Saloon
Utropolis	Offices, Supermarkets, Restaurants
Klippa Park	McDonalds, KFC, Tealive, Coffee Bean, A&W, Caltex, Decathlon

== Batu Kawan Industrial Park Seafront ==
Place	Purpose
UOW Campus	University
PLEXUS Bridge View	Manufacturer
Intuitive Surgical	Manufacturer
MKS Malaysia	Semiconductor
IJM Data Center	Data Center
IJM Construction Site	Building Site

== Batu Kawan Industrial Park 1 ==
Place	Purpose
Vitrox College	TVET University
The Ship Campus	Engineering University
HONDA	Automobil
INARI	Semiconductor
SANDISK	Semiconductor
LAM RESEARCH	Semiconductor
FLEX	Semiconductor
QDOS	Semiconductor
BROADCOM	Medical
HOTAYI	Electronic
HP	Semiconductor
CLASS A	Semiconductor
SUSTIO	Semiconductor
JABIL	Semiconductor
GREATECH	Semiconductor
BENCHMARK	Semiconductor
MICRON	Semiconductor
DEXCOM	Medical
The 12 Waves	Warehouse & Restaurants
Plaza WCOE	Clinic & Restaurants

== History ==
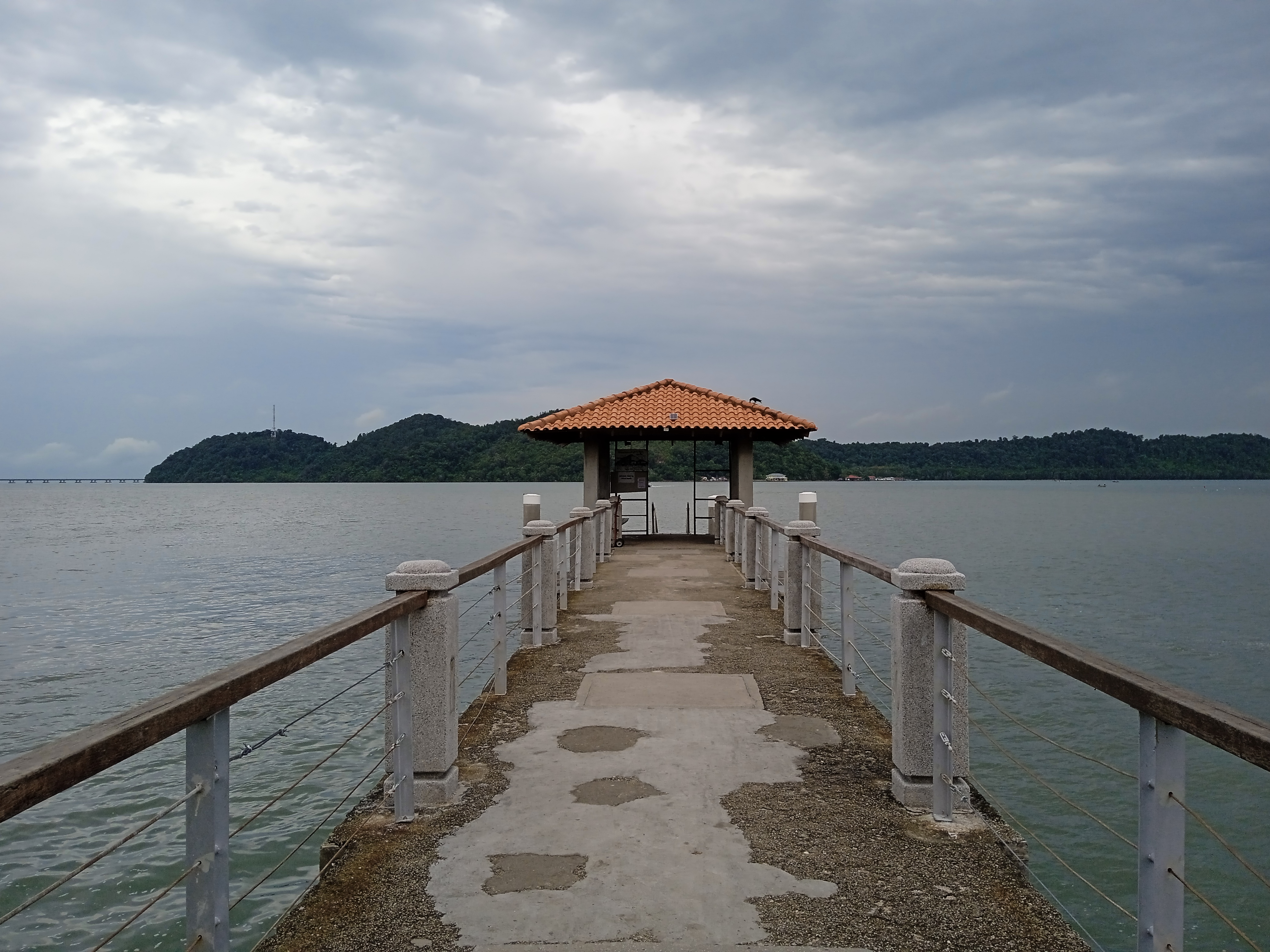
Batu Musang Jetty

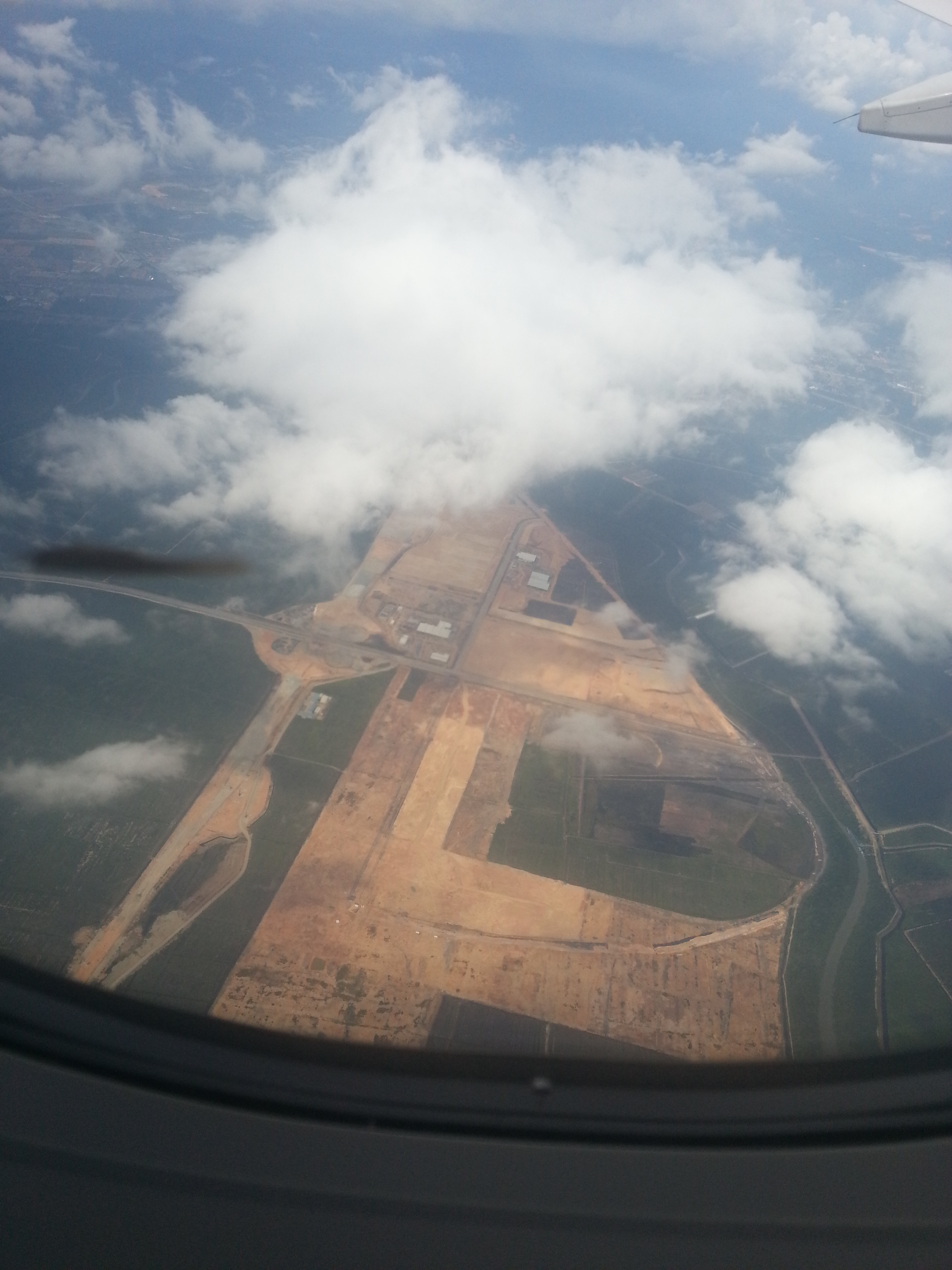
Aerial view of Batu Kawan, taken in 2012

The agricultural village of Batu Kawan had been in existence since the 19th century, when the area was home to sugar, coconut and rubber estates. In particular, sugar plantations in the area had been run by Chinese settlers as early as 1796. Granite was extracted from the area as well; the granite was then sent across the Penang Strait to George Town on tongkangs departing from the Batu Musang Jetty.

In the 1960s, the aforementioned plantations were cleared to make way for larger palm oil estates.

In 1990, the Penang Development Corporation (PDC), a statutory body of the Penang state government, acquired 6,000 hectares (60 km^{2}) of land in Batu Kawan. The Penang State Stadium, completed in 2000, was one of the first development projects undertaken by the PDC, followed by the Batu Kawan Industrial Park and the Penang Science Park.

In 2008, the Malaysian federal government commenced the construction of the Second Penang Bridge, which links Batu Kawan with Batu Maung on Penang Island. The completion of the bridge in 2014 proved to be a catalyst to Batu Kawan's contemporary development, with the town being touted as "Penang's third satellite township" after Bayan Baru on the island and Seberang Jaya in Central Seberang Perai. In 2012, the PDC launched the Bandar Cassia residential development, which is modelled after Singapore's Housing and Development Board schemes. This was soon followed by larger property developments, such as Utropolis and Aspen Vision City.

In 2015, the Penang state government declared the launch of a new development corridor within the South Seberang Perai District, which encompasses Batu Kawan and Nibong Tebal.

== Geography ==
Batu Kawan forms an island off Seberang Perai; it is physically cut off from the mainland by the Jawi River to the north and the Tengah River to the south. The suburb neighbours Bukit Minyak (in Central Seberang Perai District) to the north, Bukit Tambun to the east and Sungai Jawi to the south.

Map of Batu Kawan.
Click link at the top right corner to zoom in.
1 IKEA
2 Design Village
3 Utropolis
4 Eco Horizon
5 Bandar Cassia
6 Batu Kawan Industrial Park (BKIP)
7 Stadium

== Demographics ==
Ethnicities within Batu Kawan in 2020
Ethnicities / Nationality	Percentage
Malays	60.1%
Other Bumiputeras	0.1%
Chinese	15.2%
Indians	18.5%
Others	0.3%
Non-Malaysians	5.7%

As of 2020, Mukim 13, the subdivision that contains Batu Kawan, was home to a population of 11,409. Malays formed 60% of the population, followed by Indians at 18% and Chinese at 15%.

== Transportation ==
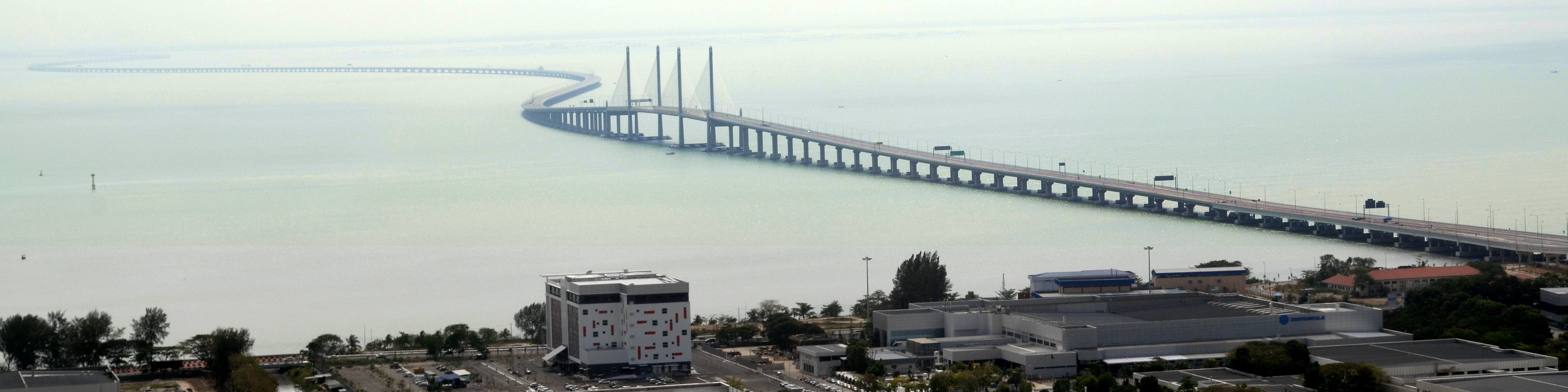
The Second Penang Bridge, as seen from Batu Maung on Penang Island

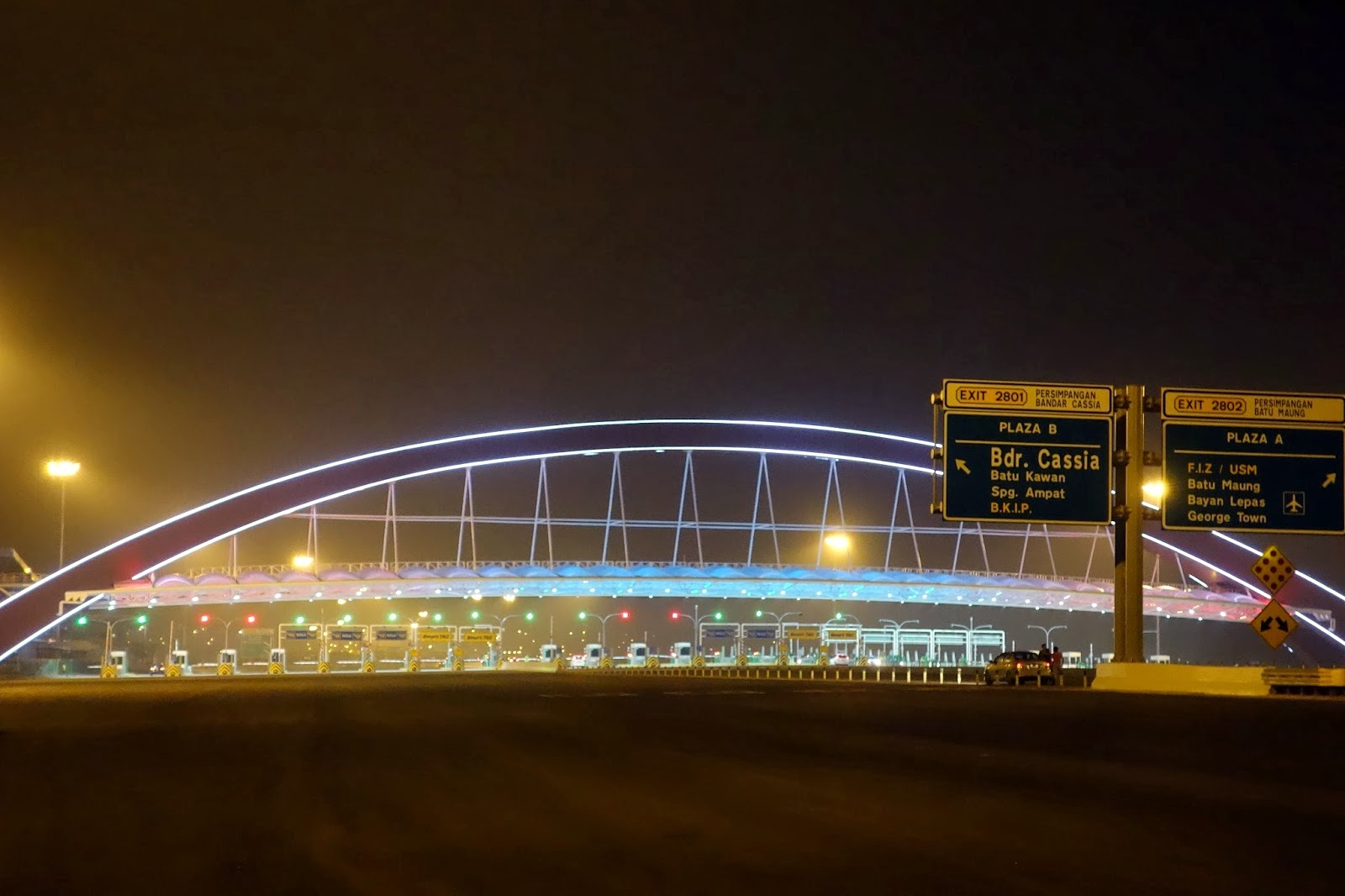
The toll plaza near the Second Penang Bridge

Lebuhraya Bandar Cassia is the main expressway within Batu Kawan. The highway is, in turn, linked to the North–South Expressway, which passes by the town.

The Second Penang Bridge, which links Batu Kawan with Batu Maung on Penang Island, spans a total length of 24 km (15 miles), making it the longest bridge in Southeast Asia at the time of its completion, a title that has since been taken up by the Sultan Haji Omar Ali Saifuddien Bridge. The completion of the bridge in 2014 also brought about the rapid development of Batu Kawan. The bridge is a tolled expressway, with a toll plaza situated at the entrance of the bridge in Batu Kawan.

Batu Kawan is used to serve by Rapid Penang's Congestion Alleviation Transport (CAT), a free-of-charge transit bus service within Batu Kawan. However this service have ceased operations since the pandemic in 2020, making Batu Kawan is inaccessible via normal public transportation methods other than e-hailing or taxi.

== Education ==
Batu Kawan is served by two primary schools and one high school.

Primary schools

- SRK Batu Kawan
- SRJK (T) Ladang Batu Kawan

High schools

- SMK Batu Kawan

A number of tertiary institutions have planned to establish their campuses within Batu Kawan as well, including University of Hull, KDU University College and Peninsula College. In particular, the 10-acre (40,000 m^{2}) KDU University campus, scheduled for completion by 2018, will be the largest tertiary institution within Batu Kawan.

== Sports ==
The Penang State Stadium, completed in 2000, is the main sporting stadium of the State of Penang and the home ground of the state's football association, Penang FA. The stadium, which has a capacity of 40,000, also played host to national-level sporting events, such as the 2000 Sukma Games.

== Retail ==
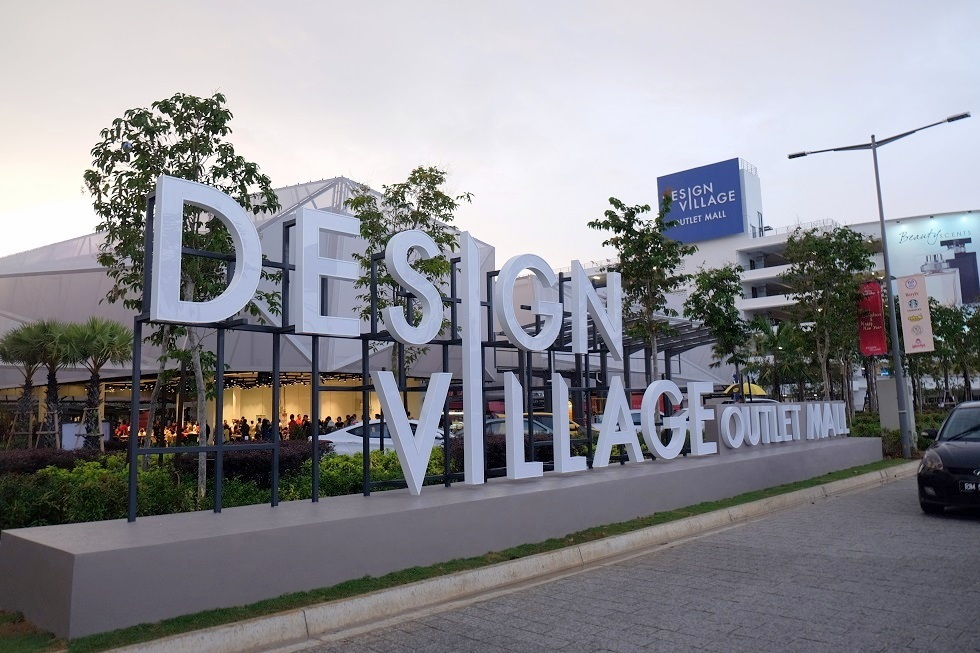
Design Village, the largest outlet mall in Malaysia

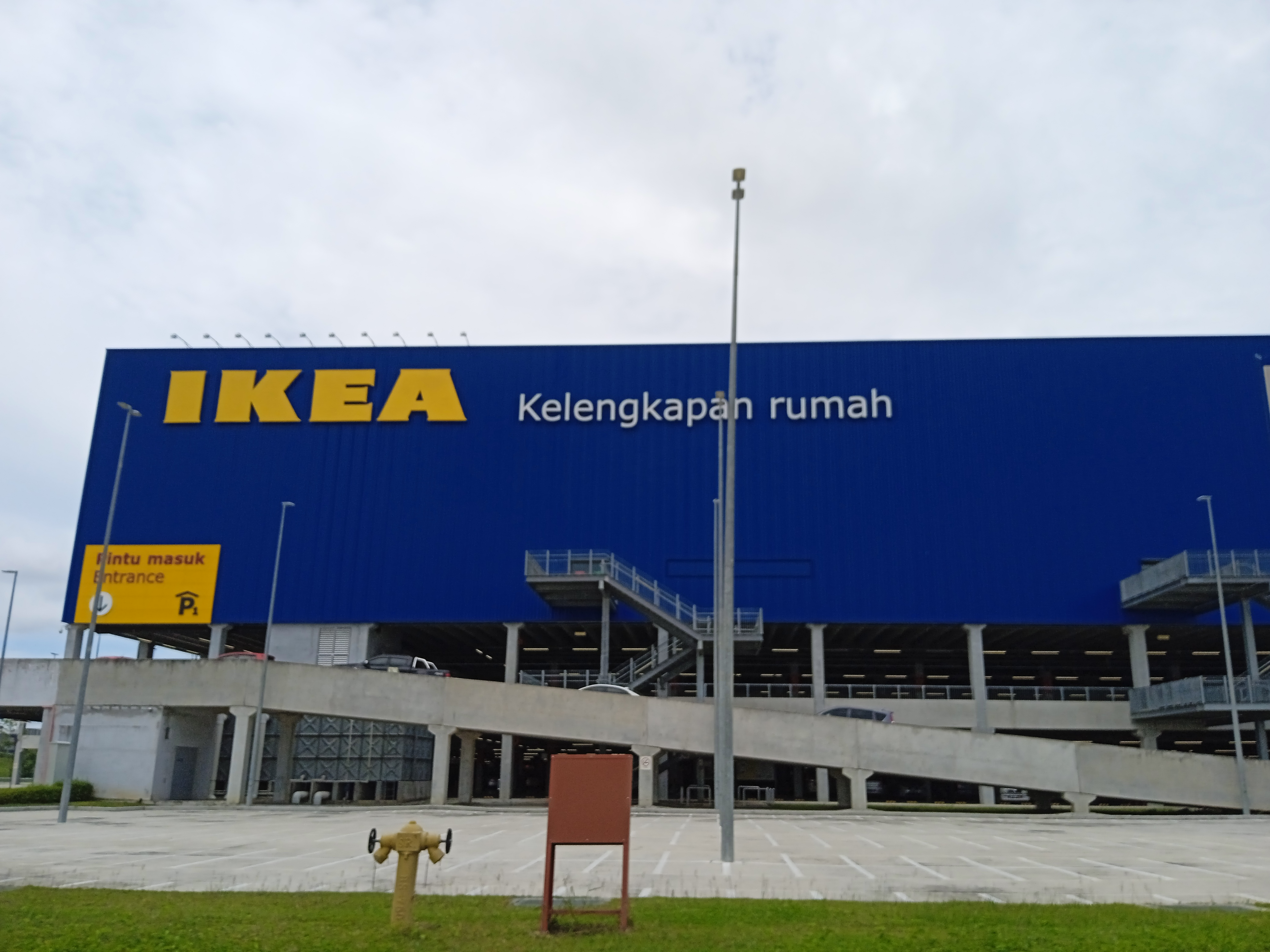
IKEA Batu Kawan

Opened in 2016, Design Village, with a built-up area of 37,161 m^{2} (400,000 ft^{2}), is the biggest outlet mall in Malaysia. Among the tenants within the mall are Gap, Timberland, Pierre Cardin, Sacoor Brothers, Superdry, Kate Spade New York, Padini, Adidas, Body Glove, Levi's, Guess, Samsonite, Esprit and Cotton On.

In 2017, the construction of the IKEA Batu Kawan store was launched by the Chief Minister of Penang, Lim Guan Eng. Slated for completion by 2019, it is the first IKEA store in northern Malaysia and spans a built-up area of 39,979 m^{2} (430,330 ft^{2}).

== Infrastructure ==
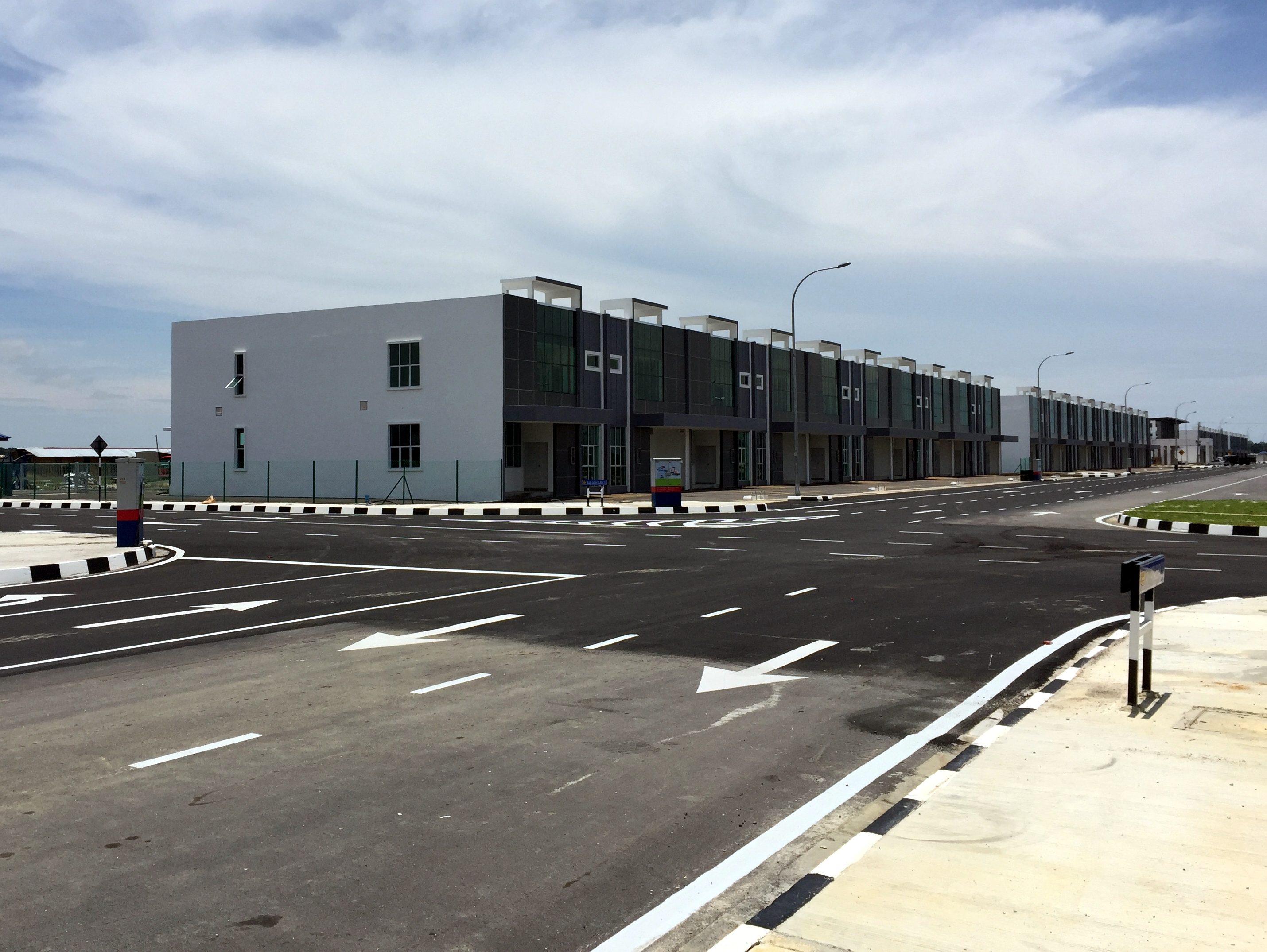
Newly-completed infrastructure at the Batu Kawan Industrial Park

The Batu Kawan Industrial Park encompasses the southern portion of Batu Kawan and is bounded by the Second Penang Bridge to the north. The 2,680-hectare (26.8 km^{2}) industrial zone has attracted a host of multinational firms, such as Boston Scientific, Bose Corporation, Bosch, ViTrox, Western Digital, Dexcom and Hewlett-Packard. In addition, a 4.2-acre (17,000 m^{2}) gold and jewellery hub is being built within the industrial park.

The major residential developments within Batu Kawan include Aspen Vision City and Utropolis@Batu Kawan, undertaken by Aspen Group and Paramount Property respectively. The former includes a financial hub, a Columbia Asia hospital, an international school and other commercial properties, whilst the latter consists of the campus of KDU University College and various other properties. Other ongoing projects within the town include the EcoHorizon residential development by EcoWorld.

In an effort to promote environmental conservation, all development projects within the town are required to abide by a 30% green area ruling, enacted by the Seberang Perai City Council.

=== Bandar Cassia ===
Bandar Cassia or Cassia City is a township in Batu Kawan. The township was developed by the Penang Development Corporation (PDC, PERDA) in 1993.
