= Design Village =

Shopping mall in South Seberang Perai, Penang, Malaysia

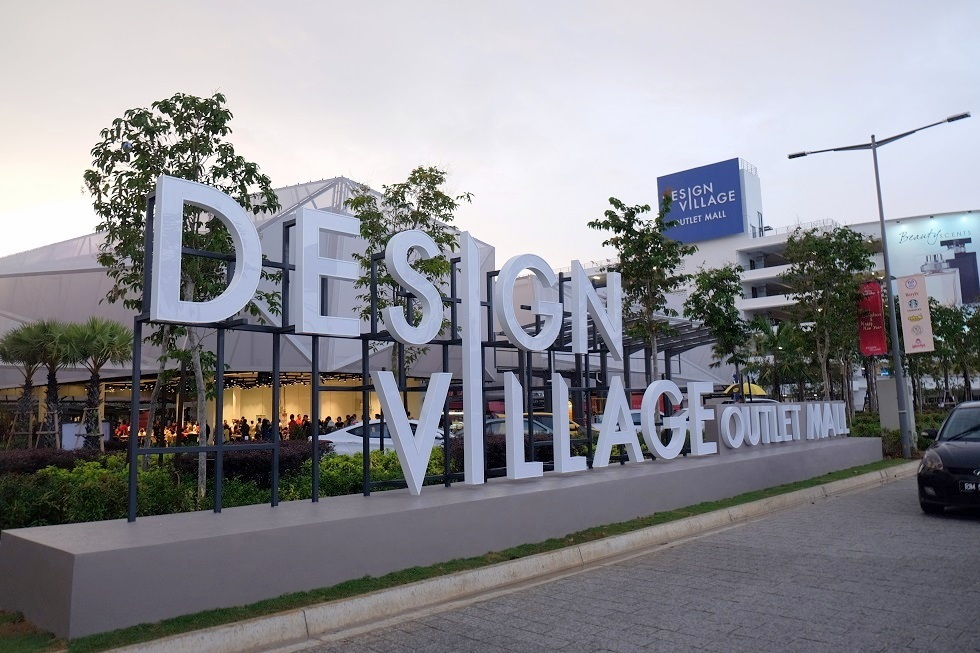
- Location: Batu Kawan, Penang, Malaysia
- Coordinates: 5.244576°N 100.438400°E
- Opened: 23 November 2016; 9 years ago
- Developer: PE Land (Penang) Sdn. Bhd.
- Num. of stores: 100
- Floor area: 37,161 m^{2} (400,000 sq ft)
- Floors: 1
- Website: designvillagepenang.com

Design Village is an outlet mall in Batu Kawan, Penang, Malaysia. Opened in 2016, it is Malaysia's biggest outlet mall, spanning a built-up area of 37,161 m^{2} (400,000 sq ft). Design Village is reportedly built on a 24-acre tropical garden. At the time of its opening in November 2016, the mall was nearly 85% filled with tenants. Among the tenants are Timberland, Padini, Adidas, Body Glove, Levi's, Guess, Samsonite, and Cotton On. A handful of health care stores also complement the wide range of international brands, including Watsons and 7-Eleven.

== Others Malls ==
- The Spring Kuching
- The Spring Bintulu
