= Nausana =

Village in Uttar Pradesh, India

Nausana is a small village in the Budaun district in the state of Uttar Pradesh, India. Nausana has a population of nearly 1,200, and the livelihood of the village is largely based on agriculture.

== Geography ==
Nausana is situated near Nichli Ganga Nahar (Lower Ganges Canal), making the water table there fairly high. The agricultural land in the area is well irrigated.

== Religion ==
Hinduism is the main religion of the village's inhabitants. A significant portion of the population also practices Islam.

== Weather ==
State	Village	Jan	Feb	Mar	Apr	May	Jun	Jul	Aug	Sep	Oct	Nov	Dec	Year
Uttar Pradesh	Nausana	30.6° (87.1 °F)	35.9° (96.6 °F)	46.6° (115.9 °F)	58.2° (136.8 °F)	64.5° (148.1 °F)	65.1° (149.2 °F)	60.3° (140.5 °F)	58.6° (137.5 °F)	56.8° (134.2 °F)	51.1° (124.0 °F)	40.9° (105.6 °F)	32.4° (90.3 °F)	50.1° (122.2 °F)

== Notable residents ==
- Sunita Godara, Asian Marathon Champion 1992

gavender kumar
