= Kendi Island =

Islet off the coast of Penang Island in Malaysia

Native name: Pulau Kendi
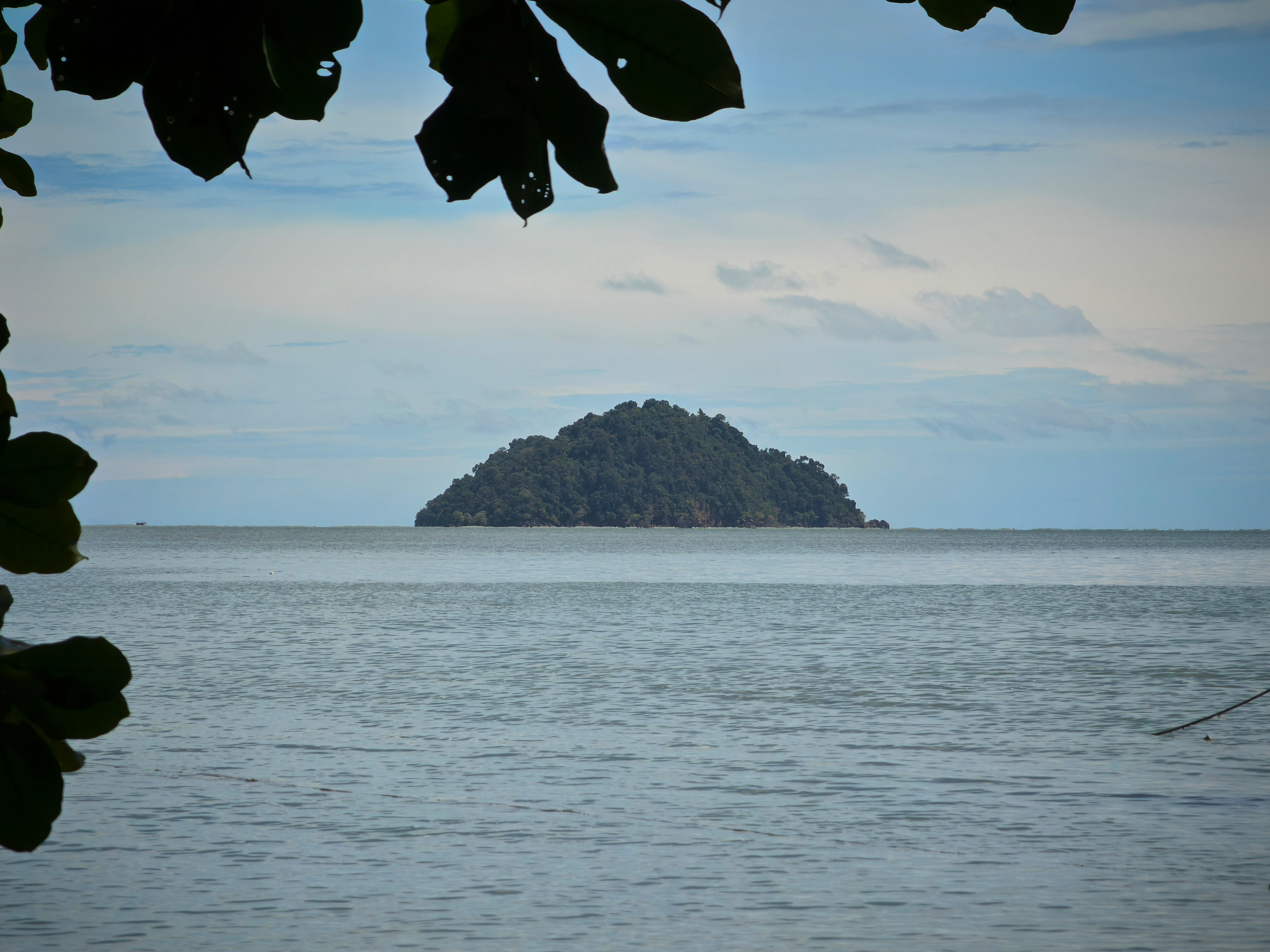

Geography
- Location: Strait of Malacca
- Coordinates: 5°13′54.8898″N 100°10′35.4″E

Administration
- Malaysia
- State: Penang
- City: George Town
- District: Southwest
- Mukim: Bukit Pasir Panjang

Kendi Island is an islet off the southwestern tip of Penang Island in the Malaysian state of Penang. Located over 3.4 km (2.1 miles) from Penang Island, this rocky, uninhabited islet is often frequented by anglers. The terrain of much of the islet's shoreline is relatively jagged, except for a few narrow beaches.

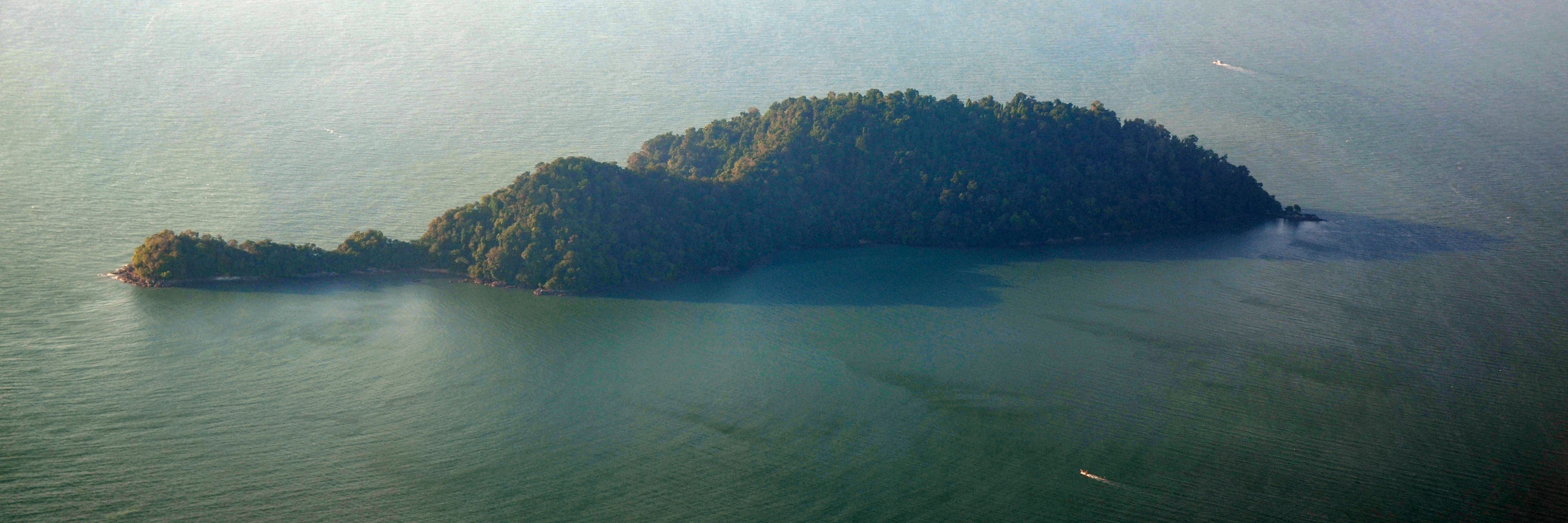
Aerial view of Pulau Kendi from the east
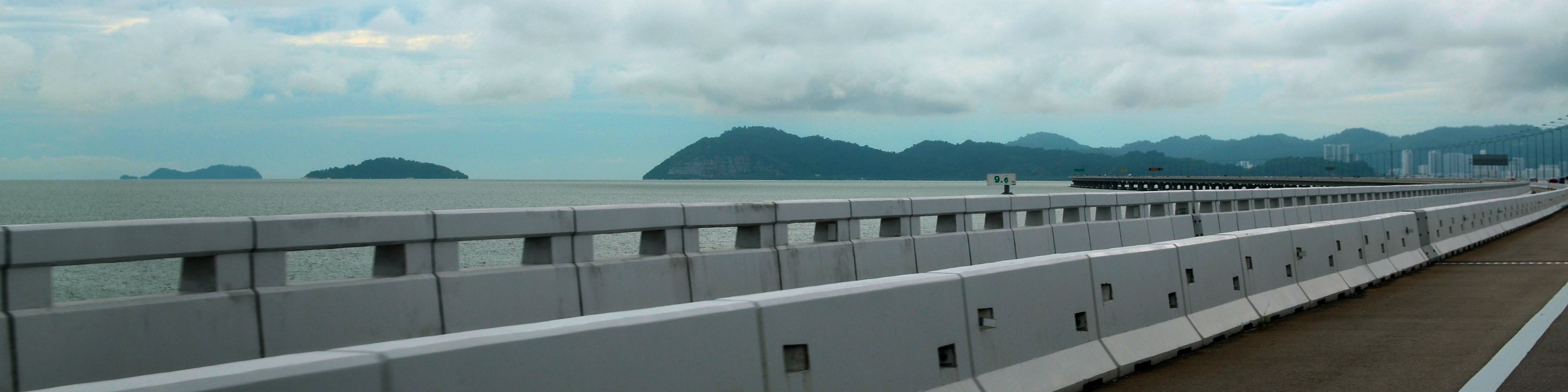
Kendi Island is the first island from the left (the second being Rimau Island) in this panorama from the Second Penang Bridge

== See also ==
- List of islands of Malaysia
