= Rimau Island =

Islet off the coast of Penang Island in Malaysia

Native name: Pulau Rimau
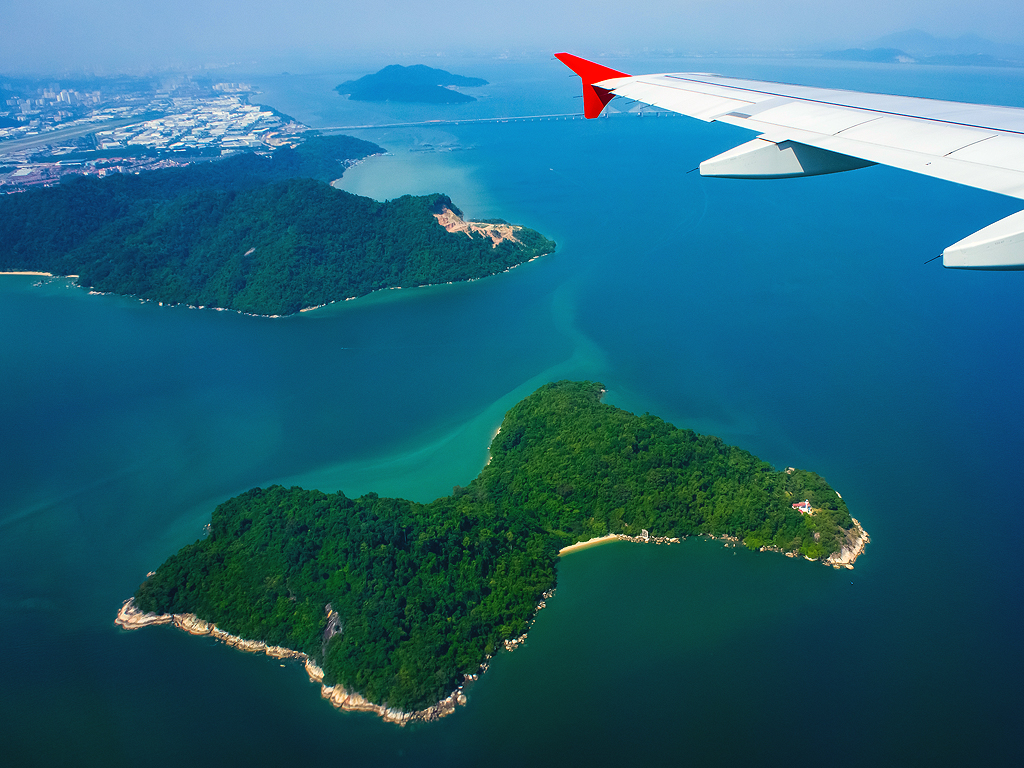

Geography
- Location: Strait of Malacca
- Coordinates: 05°14′51″N 100°16′21″E

Administration
- Malaysia
- State: Penang
- City: George Town
- District: Southwest
- Mukim: Bayan Lepas

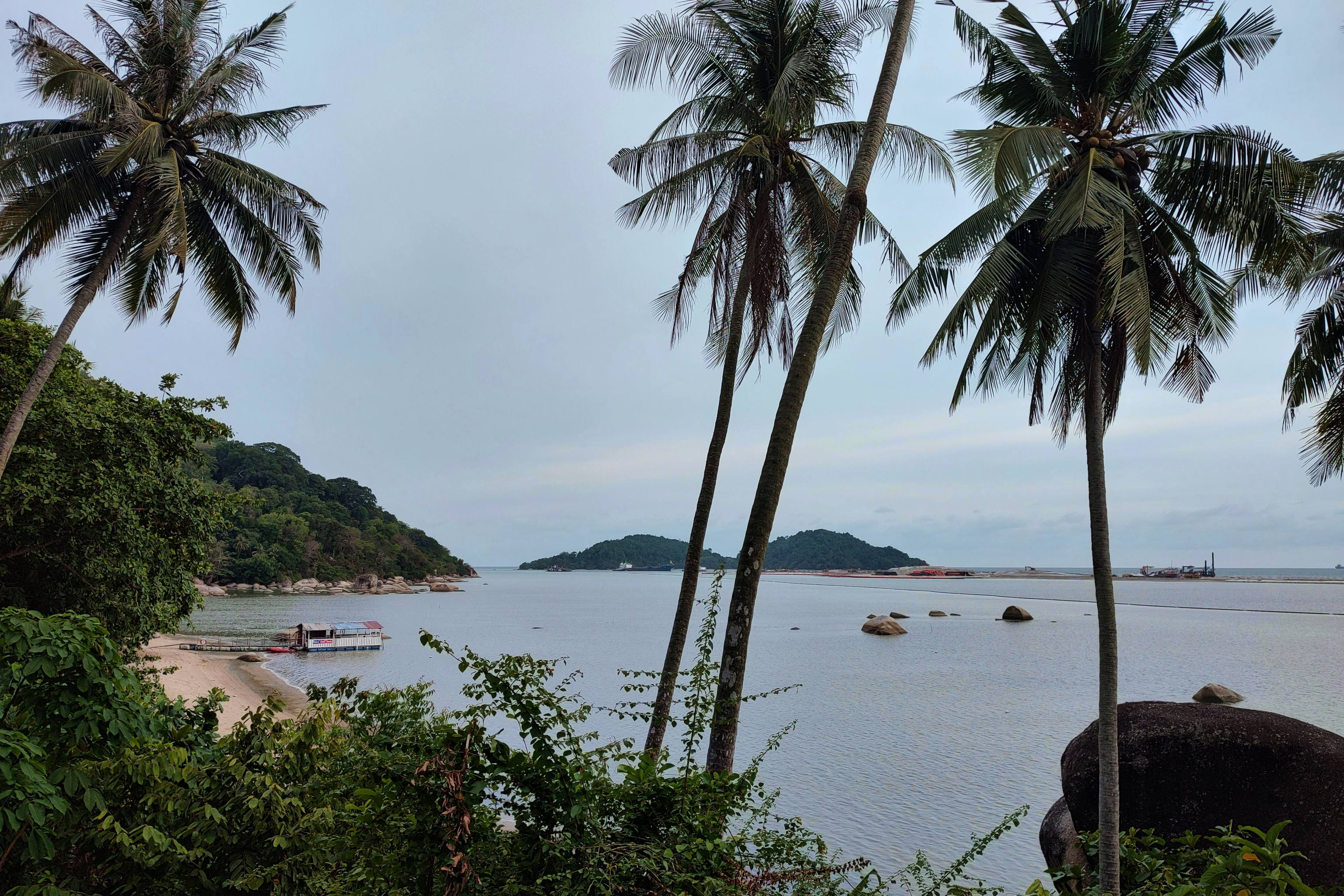
Two-humped Rimau Island from Esen Beach, Permatang Damar Laut

Rimau Island is an islet off the southeastern tip of Penang Island in the Malaysian state of Penang. The islet was once referred to by French cartographers as Île Cayment (Île Caïman in modern French spelling).

Located nearly 832 m (0.517 miles) from Penang Island, this uninhabited islet is now home to an active lighthouse, which was built by the British in 1885. This particular lighthouse, a 17 m (56 ft) round cylindrical cast iron tower with lantern and gallery, as well as a single-storey house for the lightkeeper, serves as a beacon for vessels entering the Penang Strait from the south.

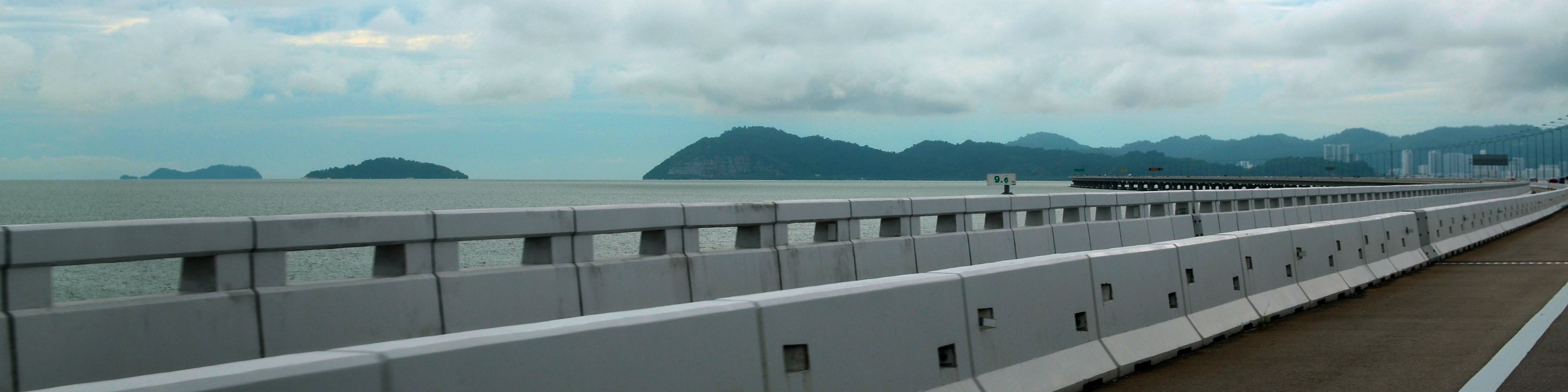
Rimau Island is the second island from the left (the first being Kendi Island) in this panorama from the Second Penang Bridge

== See also ==
- List of islands of Malaysia
