= ViTrox =

Malaysian technology company

ViTrox Corporation Berhad

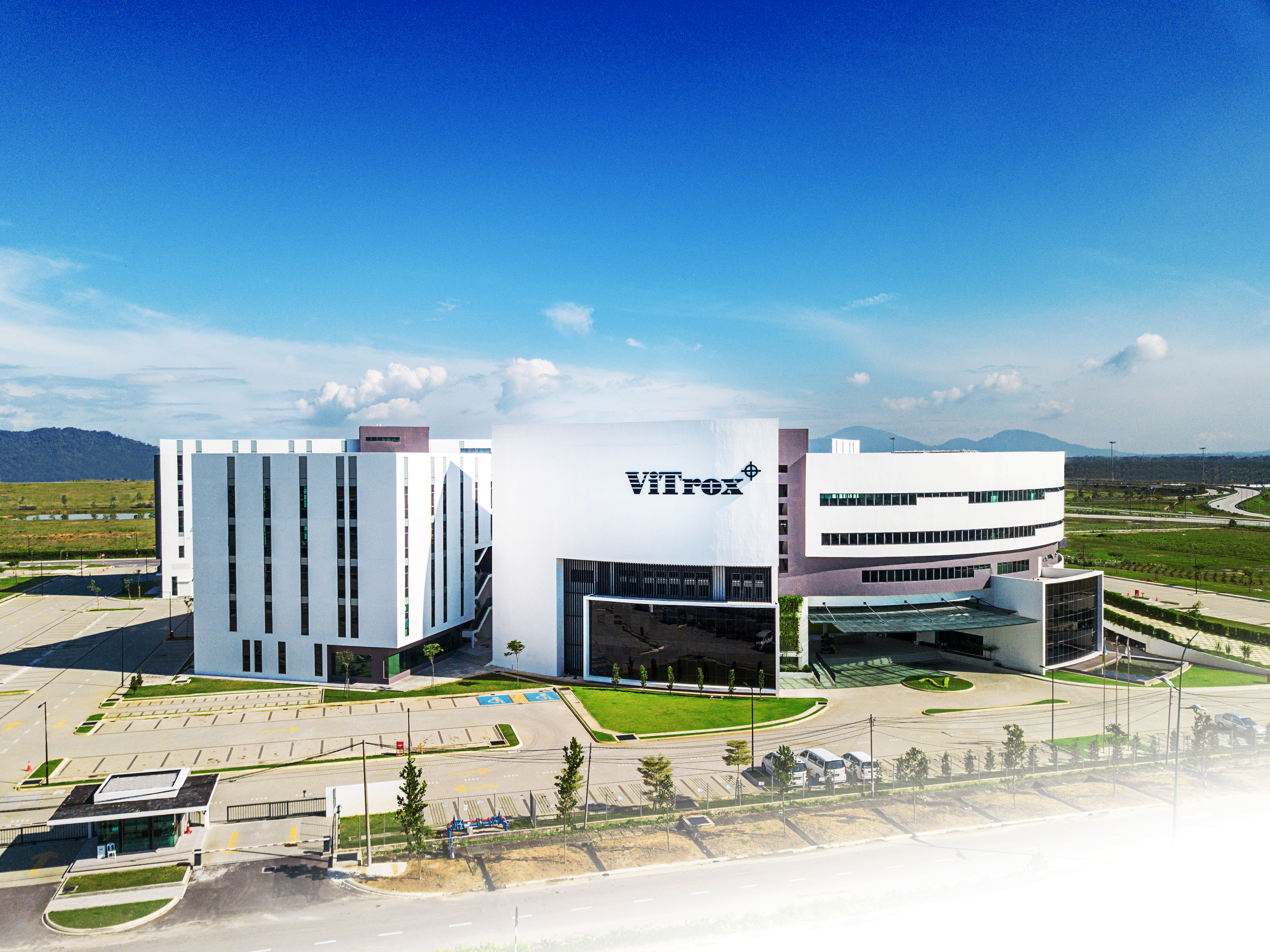
- Company type: Public limited company
- Traded as: MYX: 0097
- ISIN: MYQ0097OO004
- Industry: Machine vision OEM; Electronics
- Founded: 2000
- Founder: Chu Jenn Weng; Steven Siaw Kok Tong; Yeoh Shih Hoong
- Headquarters: Penang, Malaysia
- Area served: Worldwide
- Products: Machine Vision System; V-ONE
- Revenue: ▲RM750 million (2022)
- Net income: ▼RM33 million (2022)
- Number of employees: 1,039+ (July 2023)
- Website: www.vitrox.com

ViTrox Corporation Berhad (MYX: 0097) is a Malaysian technology company based in Penang, Malaysia, specializing in design and development of machine vision and electronics. The company is primarily focused on the automated vision inspection systems and equipment for the semiconductor, printed circuit board assemblies, and electronics communication industries.

ViTrox's products include the Machine Vision System (MVS), Automated Board Inspection (ABI), Integrated Industrial Embedded Solutions, and Industry 4.0 Manufacturing Intelligence Solution – V-ONE.

The company was founded in 2000 by Chu Jenn Weng and Steven Siaw Kok Tong, alumni of University Sains Malaysia from the 1990s. Their first product was a 2D Mark Lead Vision System. Its operations have shifted from a small rented space in Sungai Dua to the Krystal Point Office in Bayan Baru. ViTrox's operations have since relocated to several locations.

== History ==
ViTrox Technologies Sdn. Bhd. was established in 2000. In line with its expansion strategy, ViTrox relocated its operations to the Krystal Point Office and acquired a semi-detached factory in 2001. The company received the "Golden Rim Award" in Taiwan in 2004 and officially launched its 3D machine vision system. In 2005, ViTrox was listed on the ACE Market (formerly known as the MESDAQ Market) of Bursa Malaysia. As part of its ongoing expansion efforts, ViTrox established the Electronics Communication Systems (ECS) division and introduced its 5-sided machine vision systems.

In 2006, ViTrox relocated its operations to the ViTrox Innovation Centre in Bayan Lepas, Penang, and established its initial overseas sales and support office in Suzhou, China. By 2009, the company ventured into the automated x-ray inspection (AXI) and automated optical inspection (AOI) sectors, leading to the establishment of the Automated Board Inspection (ABI) Division. ViTrox also introduced the Advanced 3D Optical Inspection System (V510i 3D AOI). Concurrently, ViTrox transferred its listing from the ACE Market to Bursa Malaysia.

In 2010, ViTrox marked its tenth anniversary with the inauguration of the ViTrox Innovation Centre (Phase 2). During this period, ViTrox established the Machine Vision System – Texas (MVST) division and introduced the Advanced 3D X-Ray Inspection System (V810i 3D AXI). In 2011, the company relocated to its new facility, the ViTrox Innovation Centre (Phase 2), and also unveiled the Tray-Based Vision Inspection Handler (TH1000i). Furthermore, in 2014, ViTrox established the Centre of Excellence for Machine Vision, dedicated to research and development in the field.

In 2016, ViTrox entered into a memorandum of understanding with the Malaysia Productivity Corporation and introduced V-ONE The following year, the company established a joint venture partnership to create Penang Automation Cluster Sdn. Bhd. Additionally, ViTrox achieved a record in the Malaysia Book of Records for planting the most amenity trees within 24 hours. In 2018, ViTrox relocated its operations to ViTrox Campus 2.0 in Batu Kawan, Penang, and unveiled the Advanced Robotic Vision (V9i). n 2019, the company expanded its presence to the Penang Automation Cluster (PAC) and opened offices in Germany and Shenzhen, China. ViTrox also entered into memorandums of understanding with Universiti Tunku Abdul Rahman and the Centre of Goodness Studies.

In 2020, ViTrox launched its educational division, ViTrox Academy, and established ViTrox Agritech. In May 2021, the company revealed the acquisition of roughly 21.04 acres of land in Batu Kawan Industrial Park, Penang, as a component of its ten-year expansion master plan.

In December 2021, ViTrox earned inclusion in the FTSE4Good Bursa Malaysia (F4GBM) Index and the FTSE4Good Bursa Malaysia Shariah (F4GBMS) Index after meeting the criteria set by FTSE Russell and Bursa Malaysia Securities Berhad. In 2022, ViTrox received a four-star ESG rating under the technology industry classification benchmark for two consecutive years.

As of April 2023, ViTrox achieved a score of 50% on the Corporate Sustainability Assessment conducted by S&P Global.

ViTrox established ViTrox College, which has received accreditation from the Ministry of Higher Education. The college offers diploma courses.

== Awards ==
In 2012, ViTrox received the Industry Excellence Award. In 2013, ViTrox organised the ViTrox Open Day & Million Hearts Charity Musical Concert. ViTrox received the Prime Minister's Award for Employer Excellence in the private sector. In 2015, a ceremony was held in Campus 2.0 in Batu Kawan, Penang.

ViTrox was recognized as one of Malaysia's Best Managed Companies for 2022 and 2023, an award sponsored by Deloitte Private. ViTrox was listed again in Forbes Asia's 200 Best Under A Billion in 2023. In January 2023, the company was honoured with the "Malaysia Iconic Role Model Enterprise Awards". During the awards ceremony on 12 January 2023, ViTrox’s President and Group CEO Chu Jenn Weng was named the EY Entrepreneur Of The Year 2022 Malaysia.

== Office locations ==
- Penang, Batu Kawan Industrial Park (Headquarter/ViTrox Campus 2.0)
- Malaysia, Cyberjaya, Selangor (ViTrox Vision Lab)
- China, Suzhou, Jiangsu (ViTrox Technologies (Suzhou) Co. Ltd)
- China, Shenzhen, Guangdong (ViTrox Shenzhen Demo Centre)
- United States, Hutto, Texas (ViTrox Americas Inc.)
- Germany, Lohr am Main, Sackenbach (ViTrox Deutschland GmbH)
- United States, Bend, Oregon (ViTrox R&D Site)
- United States, Boulder, Colorado (ViTrox R&D Site)
