= Teluk Tempoyak =

- Village in George Town
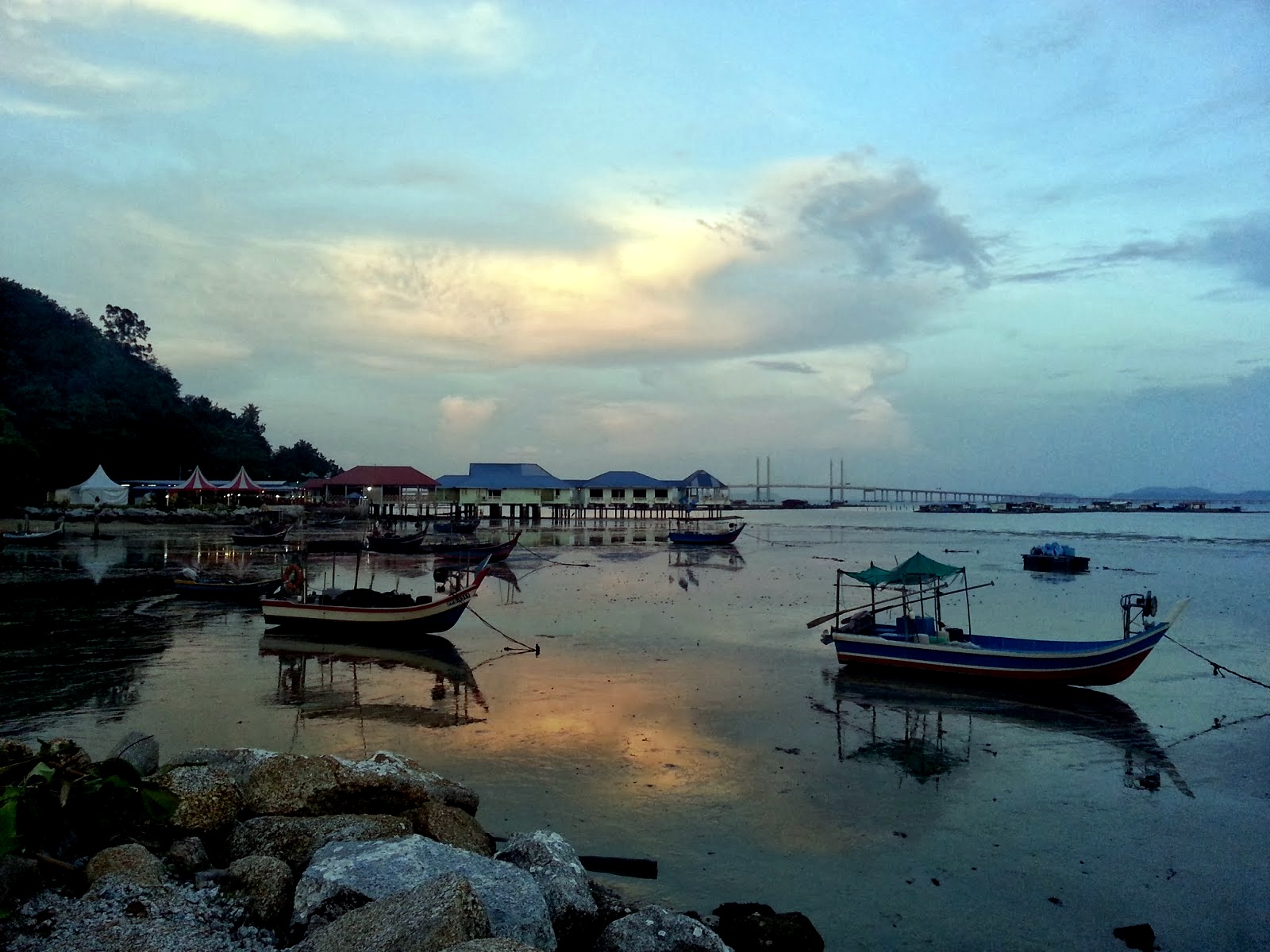

- Location within George Town in Penang
- Coordinates: 5°16′39.216″N 100°17′15.3594″E
- Country: Malaysia
- State: Penang
- City: George Town
- District: Southwest
- Time zone: UTC+8 (MST)
  - Summer (DST): Not observed
- Postal code: 11960

Teluk Tempoyak is a coastal village within the city of George Town in the Malaysian state of Penang. It is located near the southeastern tip of Penang Island, about 16 km (9.9 mi) south of the city centre. The village lies just south of Batu Maung and faces the Penang Strait to the east.

== Transportation ==
Jalan Teluk Tempoyak is the sole road that runs through the fishing village, branching out from Jalan Permatang Damar Laut and snaking through the village towards the sparsely populated southeastern tip of Penang Island. Teluk Tempoyak is also the southern terminus of Rapid Penang's bus route 305, which links the village with Batu Maung, Bayan Baru, Bukit Jambul and Sungai Nibong.

== See also ==
- Batu Maung
- Permatang Damar Laut
