= Bonia (fashion) =

Fashion retailer, based in Malaysia

Bonia Corporation Berhad
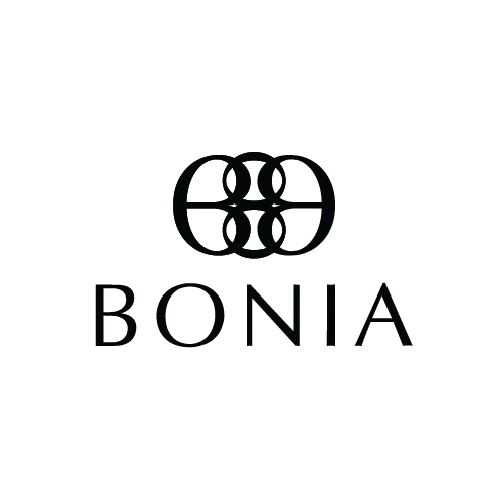
- Bonia Logo
- Type: Public limited company
- Traded as: MYX: 9288
- ISIN: MYL9288OO001
- Industry: Fashion
- Founded: 1974
- Founder: Chiang Sang Sem
- Headquarters: Cheras, Kuala Lumpur, Malaysia
- Area served: Worldwide
- Key people: Chiang Sang Sem
- Revenue: ▲RM 424.15 million(2023); RM 369.26 million(2022)
- Operating income: ▲RM 79.96 million(2023); RM 62.39 million(2022)
- Net income: ▲RM 62.6 million(2023); RM 52.56 million(2022)
- Total assets: ▲RM 693.98 million(2023); RM 645.5 million(2022)
- Total equity: ▲RM 427.62 million (2023); RM 398.32 million(2022)
- Number of employees: 787(2023)
- Website: bonia.com

Bonia Corporation Berhad (MYX: 9288) is an international luxury fashion retailer based in Malaysia, which has more than 700 sales outlets across Asia. It markets footwear, leatherwear, and accessories. It is also involved in other manufacturing businesses.

== History ==
The company was founded in 1974 by Sang Sem Chiang, the Group's Executive Chairman, who started the business of designing, manufacturing, and wholesaling leather goods in Singapore. He named the company "Bonia" in tribute to 16th century sculptor Giambologna during a trip to a leather trade fair in Bologna, Italy.

In 1978, Chiang moved the headquarters to Malaysia from Singapore.

=== Public listing on Bursa Malaysia ===
It was listed on the KLCI Bursa Malaysia secondary bourse in 1994. It was later transferred to the Main Board of Bursa Malaysia.

=== Fiscal performance and acquisition ===
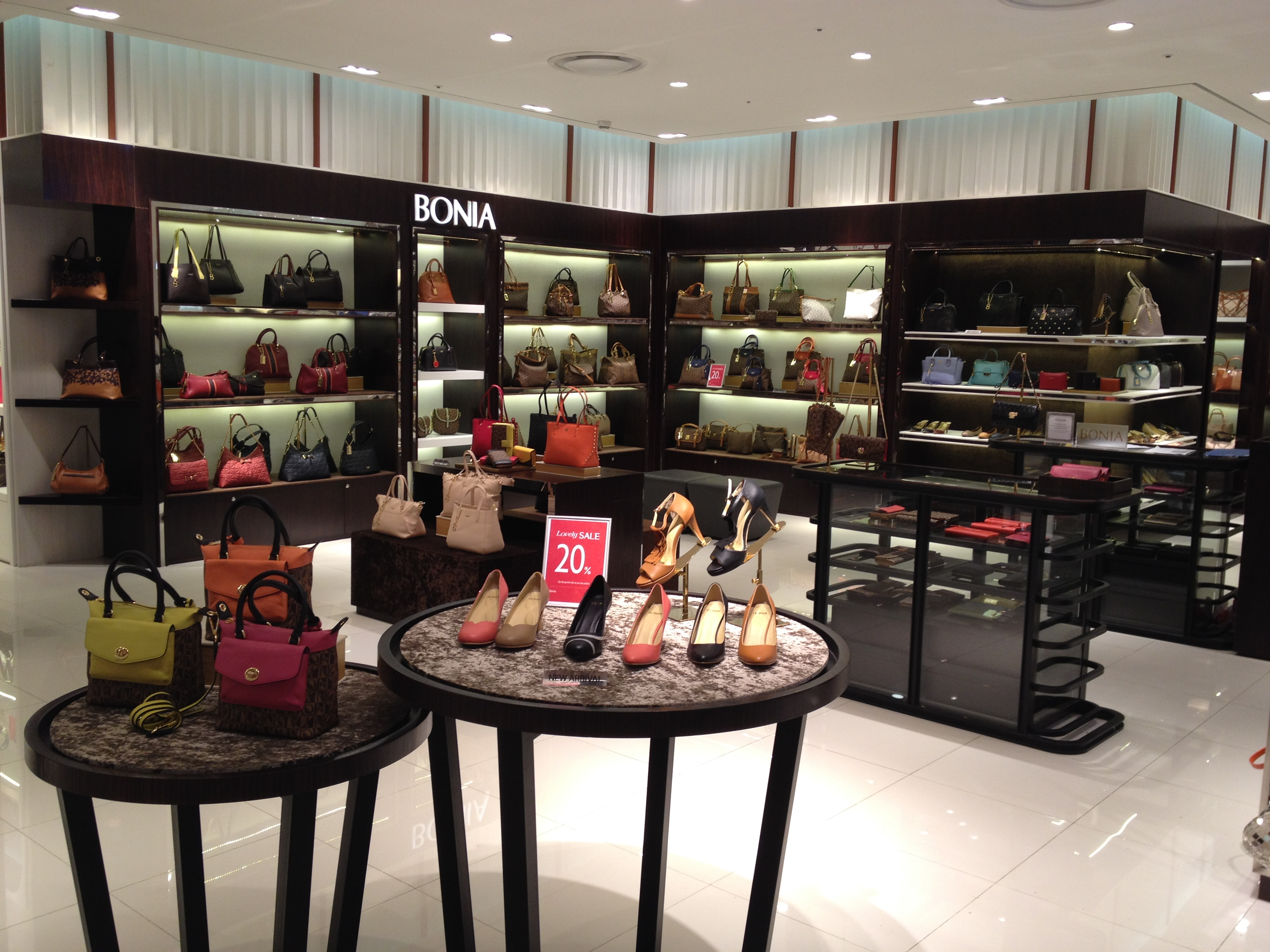
Bonia products sold at Lotte Center Hanoi, Vietnam.

For the fiscal year ending June 2011, Bonia had sales of 461.38 million Malaysian Ringgits. For the fiscal year ending June 2012, Bonia had sales of 579.81 million Malaysian Ringgits (US$182.39 million), which is 25.7% higher than in 2011. For the fiscal year ending June 2014, Bonia reported sales of 691.61 million Malaysia Ringgits (US$194.11 million), which increased 9.4% compared to the year 2013 when the company's sales were 632.32 million Malaysian Ringgits.

Bonia Corporation, Berhad gathers various heritage brands with a network of 555 retail outlets around the world.

In 2010, Bonia purchased a 70% stake in Singapore-based Jeco Pte Ltd which is the licensee of Pierre Cardin’s leather goods in Singapore and also the master licensee for Renoma in Singapore, Malaysia and Indonesia. Jeco is also the sole distributor of Bruno Magli products in Singapore and the owner of trademark and brand representative of Braun Büffel in Asia Pacific.

In 2012, Bonia acquired a 49% shareholding in German leather goods producer Braun Büffel for an estimated price of EUR 3.2 million through Jeco Pte Ltd. As part of the deal, Bonia also acquired a registered trade mark in the UAE, the US and Canada.

In 2013, Jeco, the Bonia subsidiary, brought on Damiano Biella as the creative director for Braun Buffel. Biella was responsible for overseeing a design team in Singapore and working with the German brand. In 2019, Fabio Panzeri took over as the creative director, succeeding Damiano Biella in this role.

== Brands ==
- Carlo Rino
- Sembonia

== Special campaigns ==
In 2022, Bonia had its first collaboration with local star Scha Al-Yahya for Eid al-Fitr collection. The brand has curated a special Raya campaign featuring Malaysian actress, Amelia Henderson in 2023.

== Brand ambassadors ==
- Nayeon (2023–present)

== See also ==
- Padini
- Parkson
