= Permatang Damar Laut =

- Village in George Town
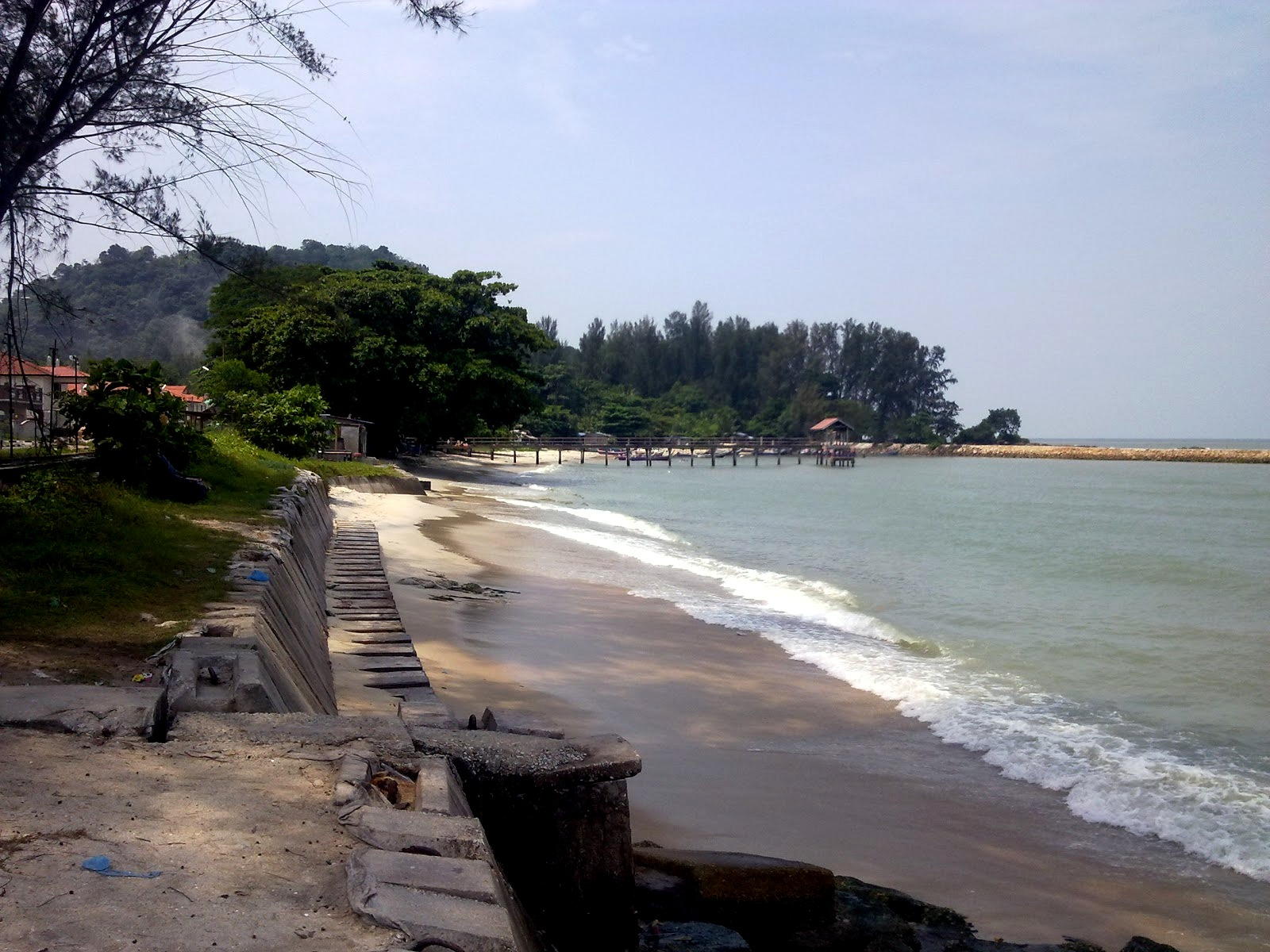

- Location within George Town in Penang
- Coordinates: 5.2778131°N 100.2673061°E
- Country: Malaysia
- State: Penang
- City: George Town
- District: Southwest
- Time zone: UTC+8 (MST)
  - Summer (DST): Not observed
- Postal code: 11960

Permatang Damar Laut is a coastal village within the city of George Town in the Malaysian state of Penang. It is located at the southern tip of Penang Island, about 17 km (11 mi) south of the city centre, making it the southernmost human settlement on the island. The village is hemmed in between the Penang International Airport to the north and the Malacca Strait to the south.

== Etymology ==
The Malay word 'Permatang' refers to the village's geographic landform, as it is situated on a ridge surrounded by mangrove swamps. 'Damar' in Malay means resin whilst 'Laut' is the Malay word for the sea; the village was purportedly where resin-producing trees once grew along the shore, hence the phrase 'Damar Laut'.

== History ==
According to historians in Universiti Sains Malaysia, the village of Permatang Damar Laut was founded in the late 18th century by three pioneers of Indonesian origin - Pah Kechil, Jamaluddin and Nakhoda Che Salleh. The village was one of the handful of autonomous Malay settlements that were established at the south of Penang Island at the time.

== Transportation ==
The main road within Permatang Damar Laut is Jalan Permatang Damar Laut, which forms part of the Federal Route 6. The thoroughfare cuts through the village, linking it with Batu Maung to the east and the old town of Bayan Lepas to the west. Permatang Damar Laut is also the southern terminus of Rapid Penang's bus route 302, which connects the village with several destinations along the eastern half of Penang Island, such as Batu Maung, Bayan Lepas, Bayan Baru and the city centre.

To alleviate worsening traffic congestion in the area, the Malaysian Public Works Department has widened a stretch of the road leading to the village in 2017. The project also included the construction of a flyover and an elevated U-turn.

== Education ==
Permatang Damar Laut is served by a single primary school - SRK Permatang Damar Laut.

== Health care ==
The village contains a haemodialysis centre operated by the Penang Fo Yi Haemodialysis Society. Opened in 2017, the Fo Yi Medicare Centre is equipped with 30 dialysis machines, which allow it to treat 180 kidney patients per month.

== Alleged effect of Silicon Island reclamation ==
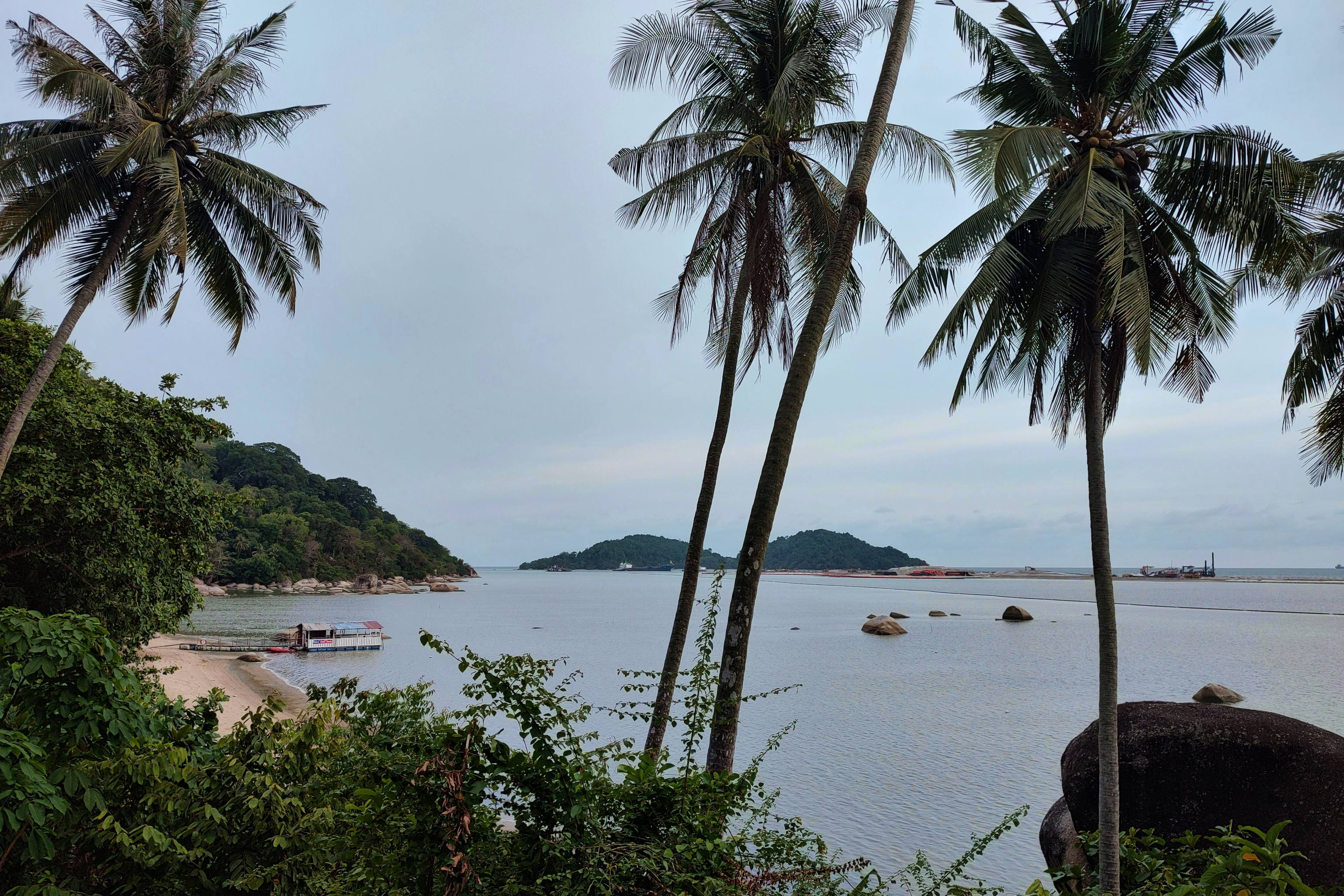
Esen Beach, two-humped Rimau Island, and Silicon Island under construction in March 2025

In November 2024, Silicon Island reclamation works were suggested by the state housing and environment committee chairman to have caused pollution and algal bloom at nearby Pantai Esen beach.

The Penang infrastructure, transport and digital committee chairman, however, claimed lack of evidence to prove that it was because of reclamation and instead blamed it on agricultural activity and sewage treatment.

== See also ==
- Teluk Tempoyak
- Batu Maung
