= Batu Maung National Secondary School =

Coordinates: 5.2820°N 100.2856°E

- Sekolah Menengah Kebangsaan Batu Maung
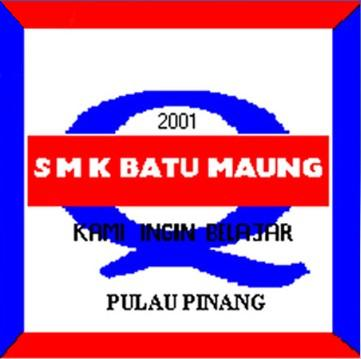
- Batu Maung, Penang; Malaysia

Information
- Type: Public
- Motto: Kami Ingin Belajar (We want to study)
- Established: 3 January 2001
- Principal: Sri Ram A/L Bilangwaty
- Enrollment: approx. 600
- Colours: Red, blue, white

Batu Maung National Secondary School (Malay: Sekolah Menengah Kebangsaan Batu Maung) is a secondary day school located in Southwest Region (Zone M3) or Batu Maung, Penang, Malaysia.

== History ==
Batu Maung National Secondary School was established in 2001 with 211 students placed in five classes and was directed by Penang State Department of Education, operating in Permatang Damar Laut National Primary School in the afternoon, with the option to converting the space to offices as needed. Tuan Hj. Ramli bin Din was principal, assisted by 14 teachers and four support staff.

The student body increased to 380 students in 2002, and the number of teachers increased to 21. On 27 January 2003, SMK Batu Maung moved to its own building. The building has two three-story blocks (Block A and D), a three four-story block (Block B, C and E), and a block of two-story workshop (Block F).
