= Sunita Godara =

Indian marathon runner

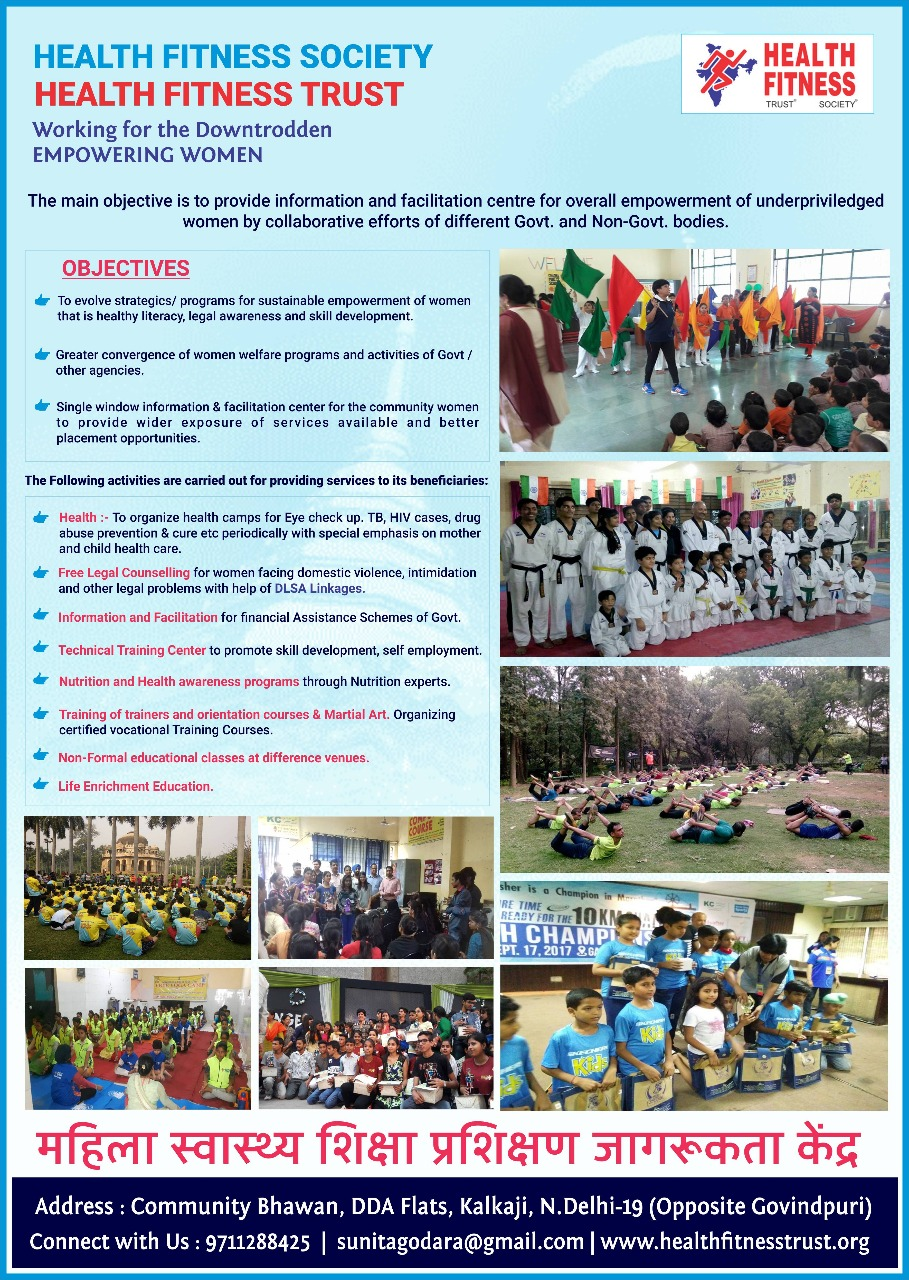
Main objective is to provide information and facilitation centre for overall empowerment of underprivileged

Sunita Godara (born 18 September 1958) is a former Indian marathon runner from Nausana. She became the national marathon champion first time in 1984 by winning Delhi Marathon She won medals in Malaysia, Thailand, India, Singapore, Philippines, Indonesia, Holland, Egypt, Japan & top 10 in many European countries & Cities- Paris, Australia, Italy, Istanbul, Turkey, the Penang 4 times and Kedah marathons. She won gold at 1992 Asian Marathon Championship held at Bandung. She competed in 1985 Boston Marathon & 1990-1991 London Marathon. She finished her College from Banasthali Vidyapith.

Sunita Godara holds the record of running the maximum marathons run by an Indian. She has run in 76 full marathons, starting with the Rath Marathon in 1984. She finished first 25 times, second 12 times, and third 14 times. In addition to that, she won 123 half marathons and has run 200 international races on all continents. In 1990 she clocked 2 hours 49.21 minutes to become the first Indian to win a world-class race. She won medals in the Penang and Kedah marathons. In 1989, she won the silver medal in the Mobil International Marathon in Singapore. She also carried the Olympic Flame at the 1996 Olympics at Atlanta. She has agreed to be a mentor of the collegiate sports program Indian Collegiate Athletic Program (ICAP).

Dr. Sunita Godara is an eminent international marathoner of repute. *She Won the 1992 Asian Marathon Championship. She has completed 76 Full marathons (42.2 km) to date and won 25 Golds, 12 Silvers & 13 Bronze medals across the globe in 26 countries, and 130,000 km covered in running.

Records of more than 200 int’l Races include 123 Half Marathons (21 km) in Marathon running carrier till 2010.

- She won marathons in Bangkok, Singapore, Malaysia, Philippines, Indonesia, Japan, Egypt, and Holland. She was among the top ten in Paris, Melbourne – Australia, Macau, Poland, Italy, Istanbul, Belgrade & Las Vegas. She has also done world-famous Boston, Berlin & London Marathons.
- She won the maximum number of Int’l Marathons by any Indian in maximum countries – 60 full Marathons and 120 Half Marathons.
- Since 2006, Dr. Sunita is professionally coordinating Top Indian Marathon Runners Pan India as Elite Runners Coordinator
