= Sacoor Brothers =

Portuguese luxury clothing retailer

- Type: Private
- Industry: Clothier
- Founded: 1989; 37 years ago
- Founders: Malik Sacoor; Moez Sacoor; Rahim Sacoor; Salim Sacoor
- Headquarters: Lisbon, Portugal
- Products: Men's and Women's; Luxury Clothing
- Website: www.sacoorbrothers.com

Sacoor Brothers is a Portuguese luxury clothing retail company headquartered in Lisbon, Portugal, with over 100 stores in 16 countries across the world.

Sacoor is well-known for its sponsorships and partnerships, including those with Portuguese footballer Cristiano Ronaldo, F.C. Barcelona, actor Joaquim de Almeida and the Portuguese Football Federation.

== History ==
Sacoor Brothers was founded on 15 November 1989 as Modas Belize in the Arroios district of Lisbon by four brothers: Malik, Moez, Rahim and Salim Sacoor.

In 2016, Sacoor Brothers won the "Most Admired International Retailer of the Year" award for the Middle East.

In 2017, 2018 and 2019, Sacoor Brothers was voted "Escolha do Consumidor" (Consumer's Choice) in Portugal.

== Operations ==
Sacoor Brothers operates over 100 stores globally, represented in 15 countries: Portugal, the United Kingdom, Belgium, Romania, the United Arab Emirates, Cyprus, Saudi Arabia, Qatar, Kuwait, Bahrain, Jordan, Lebanon, Uzbekistan, Georgia, Malaysia, and South Africa.
