= Padini =

Malaysian investment holding company

Padini Holdings Berhad
- Type: Public limited company
- Traded as: MYX: 7052
- ISIN: MYL7052OO003
- Industry: Fashion; Clothing; Textiles
- Genre: Retail
- Founded: 1975
- Founder: Yong Pang Chaun
- Headquarters: Kuala Lumpur, Malaysia, Hong Kong
- Area served: Australia; Brunei; Singapore; Indonesia; Thailand; Oman; Philippines; Egypt; Malaysia; Vietnam; United Arab Emirates; Saudi Arabia; Syria; Bahrain; Qatar; Morocco; Kuwait; Myanmar; Cambodia
- Key people: Said Mohamed Yasin, Chairman; Yong Pang Chaun, Managing Director
- Products: clothing, shoes, bags, belts, sunglasses, leather goods, necklace and other fashion accessory
- Net income: ▲RM 57.29 million (June 2018) ▲RM 49.5 million (2009)
- Website: corporate.padini.com

Padini Holdings Berhad is a Malaysian fashion company. The company primarily exports its manufactured goods to the Middle East and Southeast Asia.

== Background ==
Padini operates retail flagship stores and concept stores which houses all Padini Holdings brands under one roof. The first of such outlets was opened in Johor Bahru City Square, Johor Bahru, Malaysia in 1999. Padini Holdings Bhd focuses on fast retailing, where new products come online within weeks. Currently, its stores are scattered all around the country with store locations in Pavilion Kuala Lumpur and Mid Valley Megamall.

== History ==
Padini began its operations under the name Hwayo Garments Manufacturers Company in 1971. Initially, it was primarily involved in garment manufacturing and wholesaling. However, it entered the retail industry in 1975 with its flagship brand, Padini. In 1981, VINCCI was established to market ladies' shoes, bags, belts, and other accessories. Over the following decades, the company launched several other brands, including MIKI, SEED, ROPÉ, P & Co., and Padini Authentic labels.

In 1991, the Home Stores Sdn Bhd was launched to hold all the companies involved in the group's retail, wholesale, and manufacturing businesses. The following year, it was renamed to Padini Holdings. In 1995, Padini Holdings Sdn Bhd became a public company limited by shares and changed its name to Padini Holdings Berhad. It was also listed on the Second Board of the Kuala Lumpur Stock Exchange (KLSE). In 2000, Padini Dot Com Sdn Bhd was established to provide electronic business services and solutions for the group. In 2005, Padini Holdings was transferred to the Main Board of the KLSE.

In April 2026, in a KLSE filing, Padini Holdings announced that certain bank accounts of the company and its subsidiaries were frozen by the Malaysian Anti-Corruption Commission (MACC) in connection to the Anti-Money Laundering, Anti-Terrorism Financing and Proceeds of Unlawful Activities Act 2001 investigation. The bank accounts were unfrozen by MACC in July.

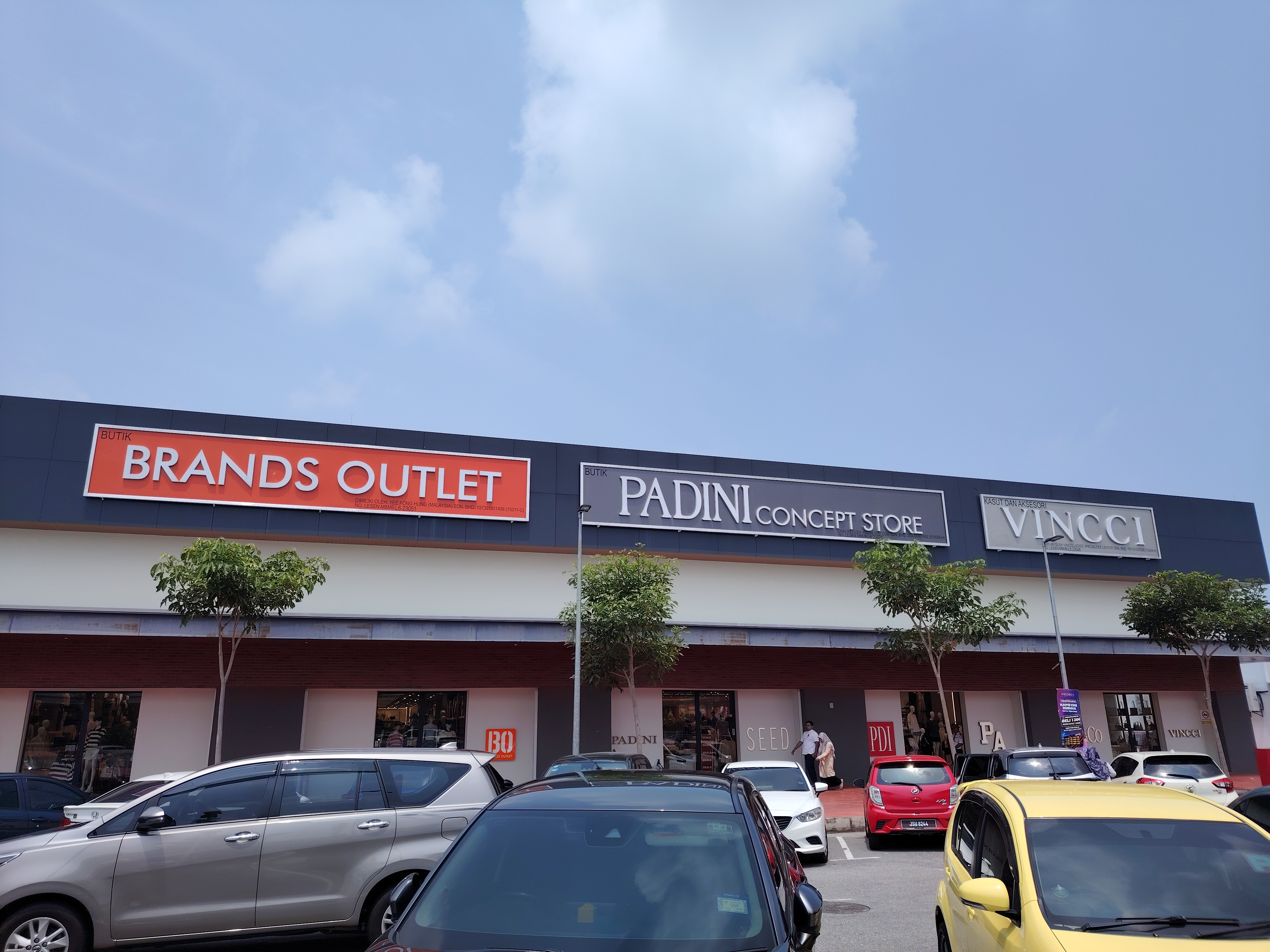
Padini Holdings' three store chains: Padini Concept Store, Brands Outlet and Vincci

== Subsidiaries ==
=== Vincci ===
Vincci (styled as VINCCI) is the most prominent brand launched under the Padini group in Malaysia. A footwear and accessories brand, providing fashion -focused products at accessible price points. Most of its shoes are made from synthetic material. It offers a range of watches, sunglasses, PVC handbags and bead accessories. The brand is available across Padini Concept Stores and other retail outlets in Malaysia and select international markets.

=== Miki ===
Miki makes clothing for children (under Miki Kids) and women in maternity (under Miki Maternity). Polyester spandex, poly rayon spandex, cotton poplin and cotton nylon are among the materials used.

=== Seed ===
Seed (styled as SEED) focuses on urban office-wear for the masses. The clothes under this line are usually jackets, coats, suits, office pants and knee-length skirts.

=== Padini Authentics ===
This brand focuses on casual wear, targeting the teenagers segment in the market. It sells pullovers, jackets, shirts and a variety of denim, khakis and knitwear.

== See also ==
- BONIA
- Parkson
