= Batu Maung =

- Neighbourhood
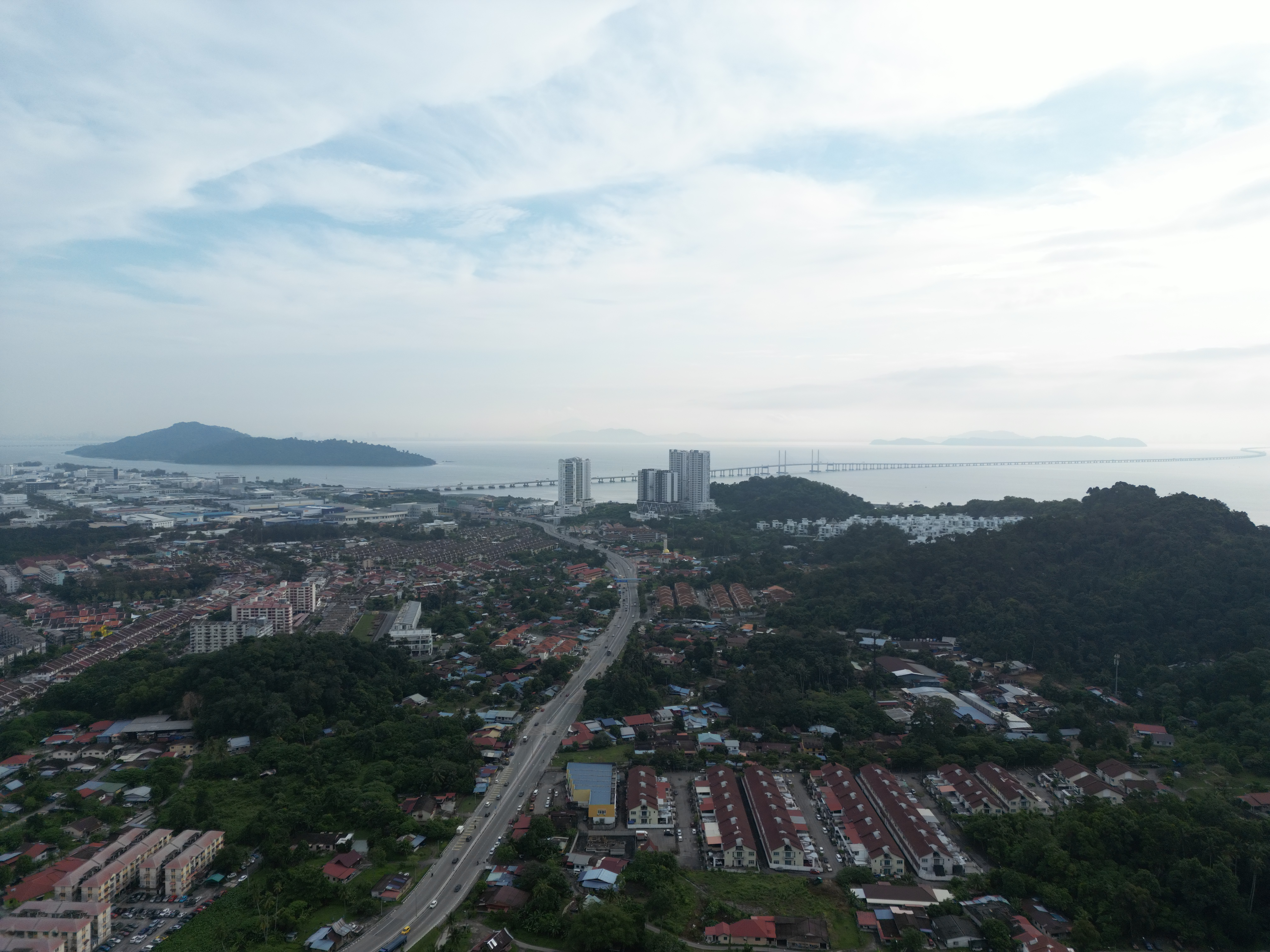
- Interactive map of Batu Maung
- Location within George Town in Penang
- Coordinates: 5°17′5.0994″N 100°17′14.9″E
- Country: Malaysia
- State: Penang
- City: George Town
- District: Southwest
- Time zone: UTC+8 (MST)
  - Summer (DST): Not observed
- Postal code: 11960

Batu Maung is a residential neighbourhood in the Malaysian state of Penang. It is located 15.7 km (9.8 mi) south of the city centre, adjacent to Bayan Lepas and the Penang International Airport. Batu Maung is home to the island terminus of the Second Penang Bridge and the southern end of the Tun Dr Lim Chong Eu Expressway. It is also surrounded by fishing villages such as Permatang Damar Laut and Teluk Tempoyak.

Formerly an agricultural village, the development of Batu Maung into a residential neighbourhood began in the late 20th century. Part of the Bayan Lepas Free Industrial Zone actually lies within the township, which also houses the headquarters of WorldFish Center and a deepwater fishing port.

== Economy ==
Batu Maung is home to an active fisheries industry. It contains a deepwater fishing port, as well as the headquarters of WorldFish Center, an international, non-profit fisheries research organisation, and the Fisheries Research Institute of Malaysia's Fisheries Development Authority.

== Transportation ==
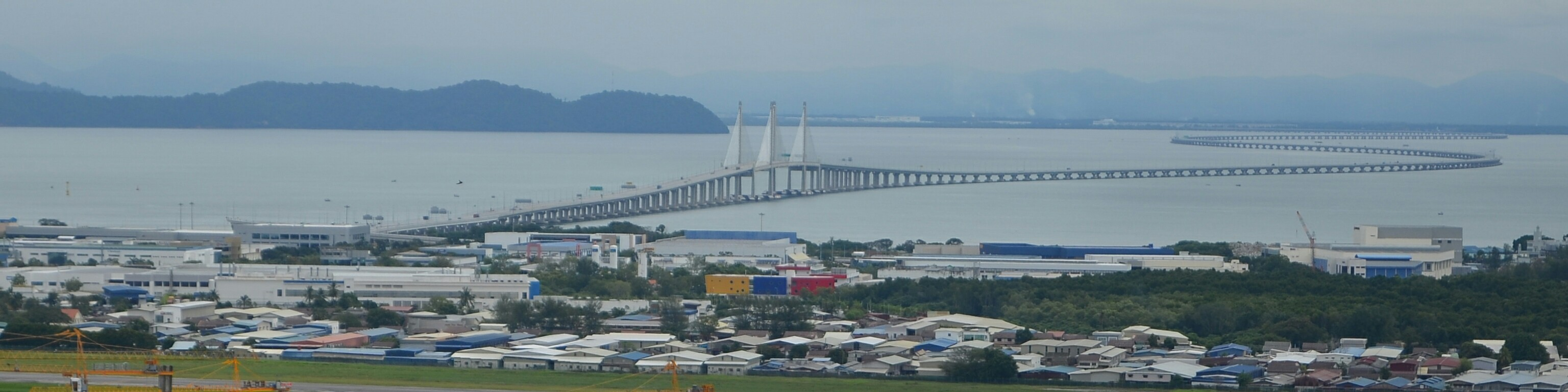
Panoramic view of Batu Maung and the Second Penang Bridge.

Batu Maung is linked to the city centre via the Tun Dr Lim Chong Eu Expressway, which has its southern end within Batu Maung itself. In addition, the Second Penang Bridge connects the neighbourhood with Seberang Perai, the mainland half of the State of Penang. Opened in 2014, the 24 km (15 mi) long bridge is currently the longest in Southeast Asia.

The major roads within Batu Maung are Jalan Batu Maung and Jalan Permatang Damar Laut. Due to the worsening traffic congestion, road-widening projects have commenced along stretches of these roads.

Rapid Penang bus routes 302, 305 and 307 include stops within Batu Maung, linking the neighbourhood with Bayan Baru, Sungai Nibong and the city centre.

== Education ==
Batu Maung is served by two primary schools and a high school.

Primary school

- SRK Batu Maung
- SRJK (C) Wen Khai

High school

- SMK Batu Maung

== Infrastructure ==
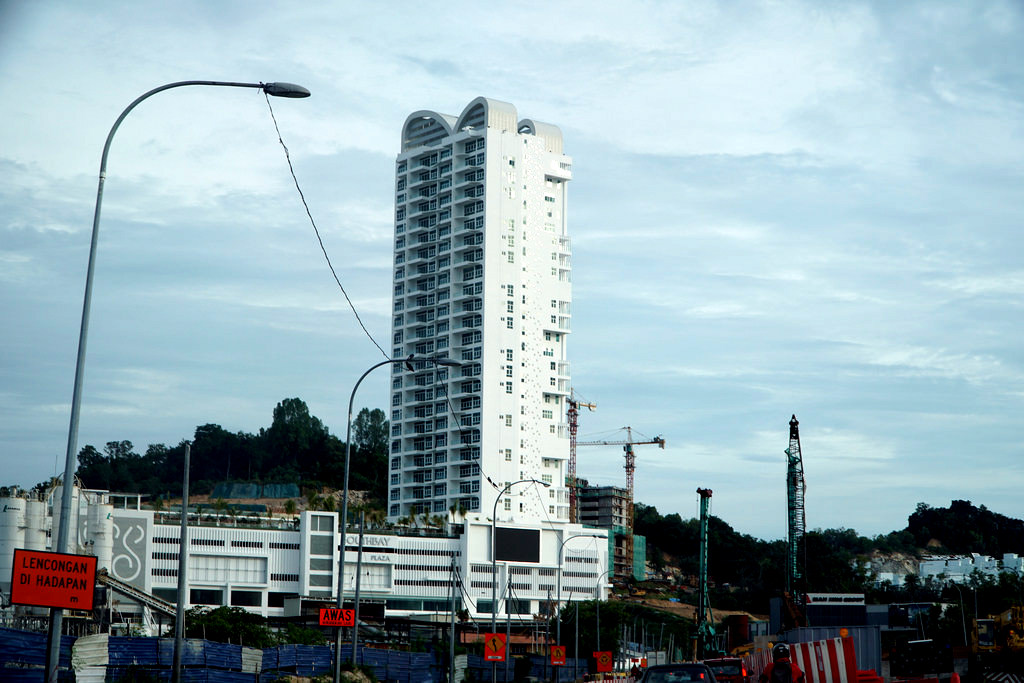
Southbay residential complex under construction

Batu Maung is home to an active fisheries industry and a deepwater fishing port. As a hub for the fisheries industry, Batu Maung contains the headquarters of WorldFish Center, an international, non-profit fisheries research organisation, as well as the Fisheries Research Institute of Malaysia's Fisheries Development Authority.

Plans have been mooted by the Malaysian federal government to develop Batu Maung into an international tuna fishing port. However, the construction of the tuna port eventually stalled in 2011 and has never been completed to this day.

Following the completion of the Second Penang Bridge in 2014, land prices at Batu Maung have increased tremendously, luring property developers to launch more residential projects within the neighbourhood.

== Tourist attractions ==
Located at Batu Maung, the Penang War Museum was originally a British Army fort built in the 1930s. However, when the Imperial Japanese Army invaded Penang in December 1941, the Commonwealth forces, led by Lieutenant-General Arthur Percival, evacuated Penang Island without a shot being fired. The abandoned fort was subsequently captured and put to use by the Japanese during the war. Following the war's end, the fort was left forgotten until its eventual conversion into a war museum in 2002.

The Penang War Museum still retains the original military structures and equipment left behind by the British forces, such as bunkers, tunnels and machine-gun emplacements. The museum also serves as a venue for paintball activities.

== See also ==
- Permatang Damar Laut
- Teluk Tempoyak
