= Mutiara Line =

Light rail line in the Malaysian state of Penang

LRT Mutiara Line
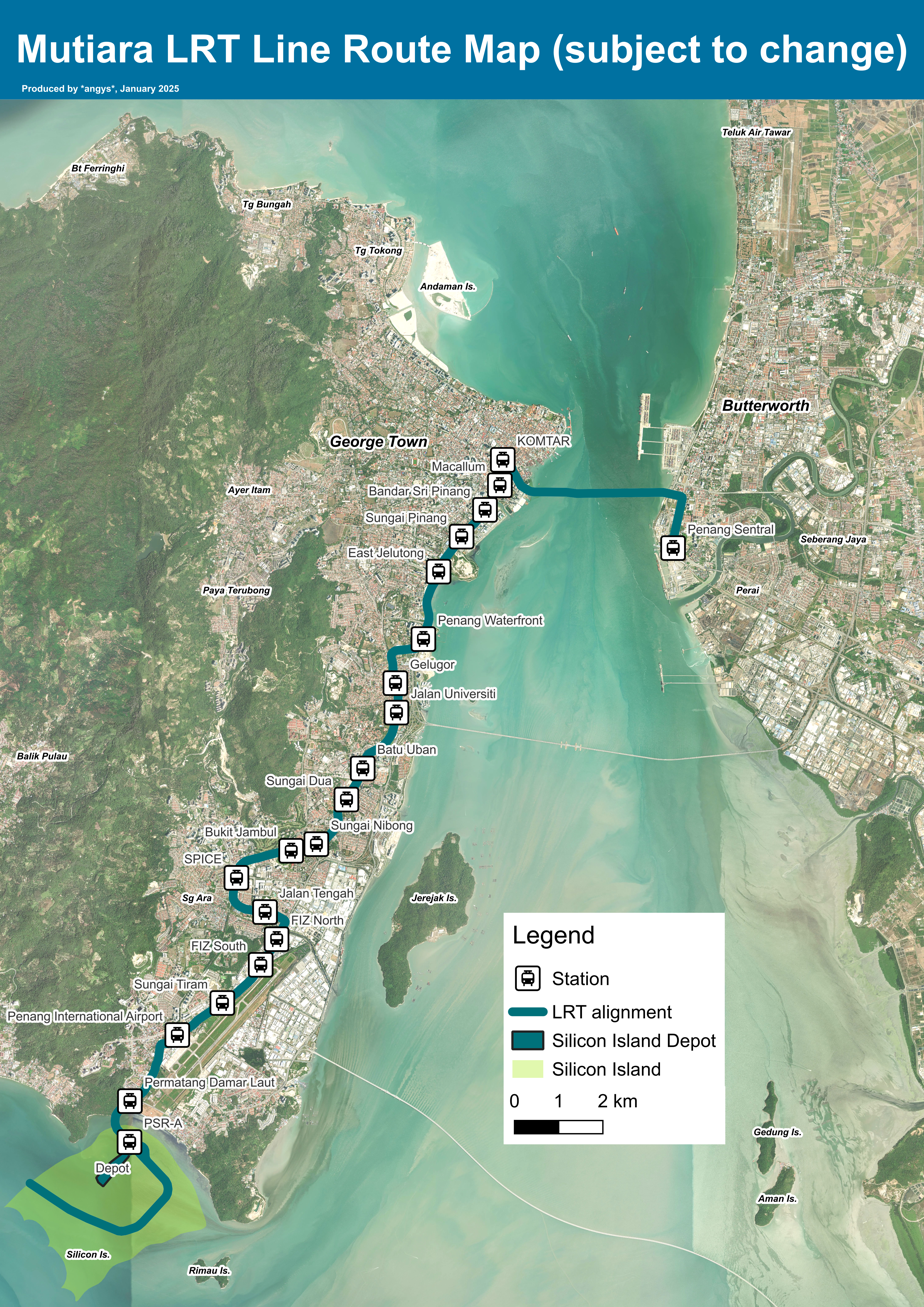

Overview
- Native name: Laluan Mutiara
- Status: Under construction (16% as of October 2026)
- Owner: Malaysia Rapid Transit Corporation
- Locale: Penang
- Coordinates: 5.3326677°N 100.2952707°E
- Termini: PSR-A; Penang Sentral Komtar
- Stations: 20 and 2 provisional
- Website: laluanmutiara.mymrt.com.my

Service
- Type: Light rapid transit
- Depot(s): Silicon Island; Sungai Nibong

History
- Work began: 11 January 2025; 21 months ago
- Planned opening: December 2031; 5 years' time

Technical
- Line length: 29.5 km (18.3 mi)
- Character: Elevated
- Electrification: 750 V DC
- Operating speed: 70 km/h (43 mph)

The LRT Mutiara Line (English: Pearl) is a light rapid transit (LRT) system under construction in Penang. The 29.5 km (18.3 mi) line will connect George Town's city centre with its southern suburbs of Jelutong, Gelugor and Bayan Lepas, with a link towards Seberang Perai across the Penang Strait. The first domestic LRT line outside the Klang Valley, (Note: While the RTS Link in Johor is the first LRT system outside the Klang Valley, it operates as a cross-border service with an international boundary into Singapore. Therefore, the Mutiara Line holds the distinction of being the first comprehensive, strictly domestic LRT line outside the Klang Valley.) the Mutiara Line is a component of the Penang Transport Master Plan (PTMP) and comprises 22 stations. Once completed, it will be owned by the Malaysia Rapid Transit Corporation (Note: Formerly Mass Rapid Transit Corporation Sdn Bhd) (MRT Corp). Construction of the line began in 2025 and it is planned to be completed by December 2031.

An LRT or rapid transit system has been proposed for Penang for decades, with early plans dating back to 1981. However, the project faced prolonged delays due to political disputes between rival coalitions. Over the years, proposals shifted between heavy rail, heritage trams and a monorail system. The monorail, proposed in 2002, was ultimately scrapped in 2008 following the Barisan Nasional (BN) government's defeat in the state election that year. The current project was introduced by the Penang state government, under Pakatan Rakyat (PR), in 2015 as the "Bayan Lepas line" under the PTMP. The plan envisioned a light metro system operating along a north-south axis across George Town's heavily urbanised eastern shoreline, with a planned extension toward Silicon Island.

The project received conditional approval from the Malaysian federal government in 2019, and construction was scheduled to begin in 2020. However, the project faced successive delays due to the COVID-19 pandemic and the nationwide political crisis, which led to a withdrawal of support by alternating ruling coalitions before the federal government eventually intervened. Following the 2022 general election, the federal government, which now included Pakatan Harapan (PH) members, the successors of PR, expedited development by providing additional funding before fully taking over the project from the Penang state government. The line was subsequently re-designated and its alignment substantially redesigned, introducing a cross-strait link from George Town to Seberang Perai on the mainland.

== Overview ==
The Mutiara line forms the backbone of the PTMP, an initiative created by the Penang state government in 2015 to improve transport infrastructure throughout the state. The master plan includes several rapid transit lines, including one that spans the north–south axis of George Town's east coast between the city centre and Bayan Lepas. As of 2018, average daily traffic along the city centre–Bayan Lepas axis reached 64,144 vehicles, further necessitating an alternative mode of transportation to serve the densely populated urban and industrial corridor. In addition, the transit service would facilitate easier commutes for tourists arriving via the Penang International Airport.

== History ==
=== Initial design ===
In April 2015, news reports emerged about the proposed LRT line from Komtar to the Penang International Airport. The 17.5 km (10.9 mi) line was expected to cost around RM4.5 billion. Chow Kon Yeow, who held the position of Local Government, Traffic Management and Flood Mitigation Executive Councillor at the time, was quoted as saying that the LRT would take five to six years to complete. Months later, Chief Minister Lim Guan Eng announced the appointment of SRS Consortium as the Project Delivery Partner (PDP) for the Penang Transport Master Plan (PTMP). The consortium consists of Gamuda Berhad as the majority shareholder, Penang-based Loh Phoy Yen Holdings and Ideal Property Development.

In December that year, SRS Consortium announced that the construction of the Bayan Lepas LRT would commence in 2018, with the goal of completing it by 2024. The original route of the Bayan Lepas LRT was disclosed in February the following year. The proposed route consisted of 19 stations spanning a 22 km (14 mi) stretch between Komtar and Permatang Damar Laut, with another eight stations planned for the proposed Penang South Islands (PSI) reclamation project, bringing the total length of the LRT line to 30 km (19 mi).

As public transportation falls under the ambit of the Malaysian federal government, in March 2016, the state government submitted the proposed Bayan Lepas LRT system to the federal Land Public Transport Commission (SPAD) for approval. An Environmental Impact Assessment (EIA) was also submitted to the federal Department of Environment (DOE) in 2017.

Funding became a contentious issue, as at that point, Penang was an opposition state governed by the Pakatan Rakyat (PR) bloc (now Pakatan Harapan, or PH). The Najib Razak administration had ignored requests by the state government for federal funding, forcing the state to resort to the PSI reclamation project to fund the PTMP. The state estimated that the sale of the reclaimed islets would generate RM70 billion in revenue, which would help finance the cost of PTMP. Additionally, the development of the islets was projected to result in economic spillover of RM100 billion.

=== Receiving government support ===
The PSI project became a political issue prior to the elections in 2018, with the incumbent Barisan Nasional (BN) federal government opposing the reclamation on the grounds of protecting the livelihoods of the affected fishermen. The PTMP, along with the PSI, formed part of Pakatan Harapan's (PH) 68-point election manifesto for Penang. Consequently, the Bayan Lepas LRT, which was dependent on the reclamation project, did not receive approval until after the elections when PH came into federal power. In 2019, the federal Ministry of Transport gave conditional approval for the Bayan Lepas LRT. The estimated cost of the line had increased to RM8.4 billion.

Detailed plans of the Bayan Lepas LRT were put on public display in 2019 as part of the conditional approval. Despite dissent from certain interest groups, the LRT received close to 98% support from the public. Chow, who succeeded Lim as Chief Minister after the election, stated that construction of the LRT would begin in 2020, and that the state government had secured a sovereign guarantee from the PH administration to issue bonds for the LRT.

=== Successive withdrawal of government support ===
Following the 2020–2022 Malaysian political crisis, the federal government rescinded the guarantee for a US$500 million loan application to the Asian Development Bank (ADB) for financing the Bayan Lepas LRT. PH politicians from Penang subsequently accused the Perikatan Nasional administration of "political vendetta". In the midst of the political feuding and the nationwide quarantine imposed in response to the COVID-19 pandemic, the state government announced that they would pursue other financing options for the LRT project. By then, the project was estimated to cost RM9.5 billion.

=== Revival and redesign ===
In 2022, the state government initiated a request for proposal (RFP) to obtain private funding and pre-qualify potential operators of the Bayan Lepas LRT. The RFP received eight submissions from local and international consortiums by the end of the year, with the state government planning to commence construction in 2023.

The federal election in 2022 resulted in a coalition government headed by PH chairman Anwar Ibrahim. As Prime Minister, Anwar announced additional federal allocations in May 2023 to expedite the development of the Bayan Lepas LRT line. With more funds being made available, the state government decided to scale down the PSI project from three to one islet (Silicon Island).

After months of studies, in 2024, the federal government took over the LRT line, renaming it the Mutiara LRT Line. Malaysia Rapid Transit Corporation (Note: Formerly Mass Rapid Transit Corporation Sdn Bhd) (MRT Corp) was appointed the developer and asset owner, while SRS Consortium was offered the contract for civil engineering of the first segment, which stretches from the Silicon Island to Komtar. Significant changes were made to the alignment, including a cross-strait extension from Komtar to Penang Sentral at Butterworth and a proposed depot at Sungai Nibong. Following negotiations between federal and state authorities, the alignment was shortened to 29.5 km (18.3 mi), while the Macallum and Sungai Dua stations were designated as interchange stations. Komtar was intended to function as an interchange station for future metro lines in George Town.

=== Construction ===
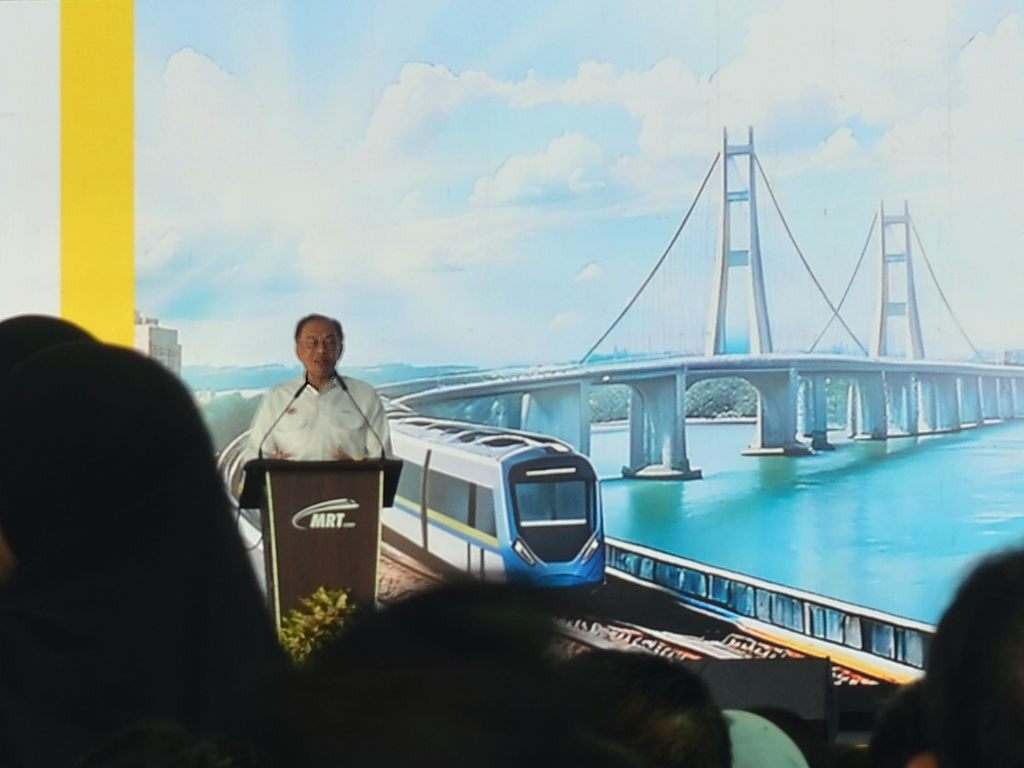
Prime Minister Anwar Ibrahim at the groundbreaking ceremony in 2025

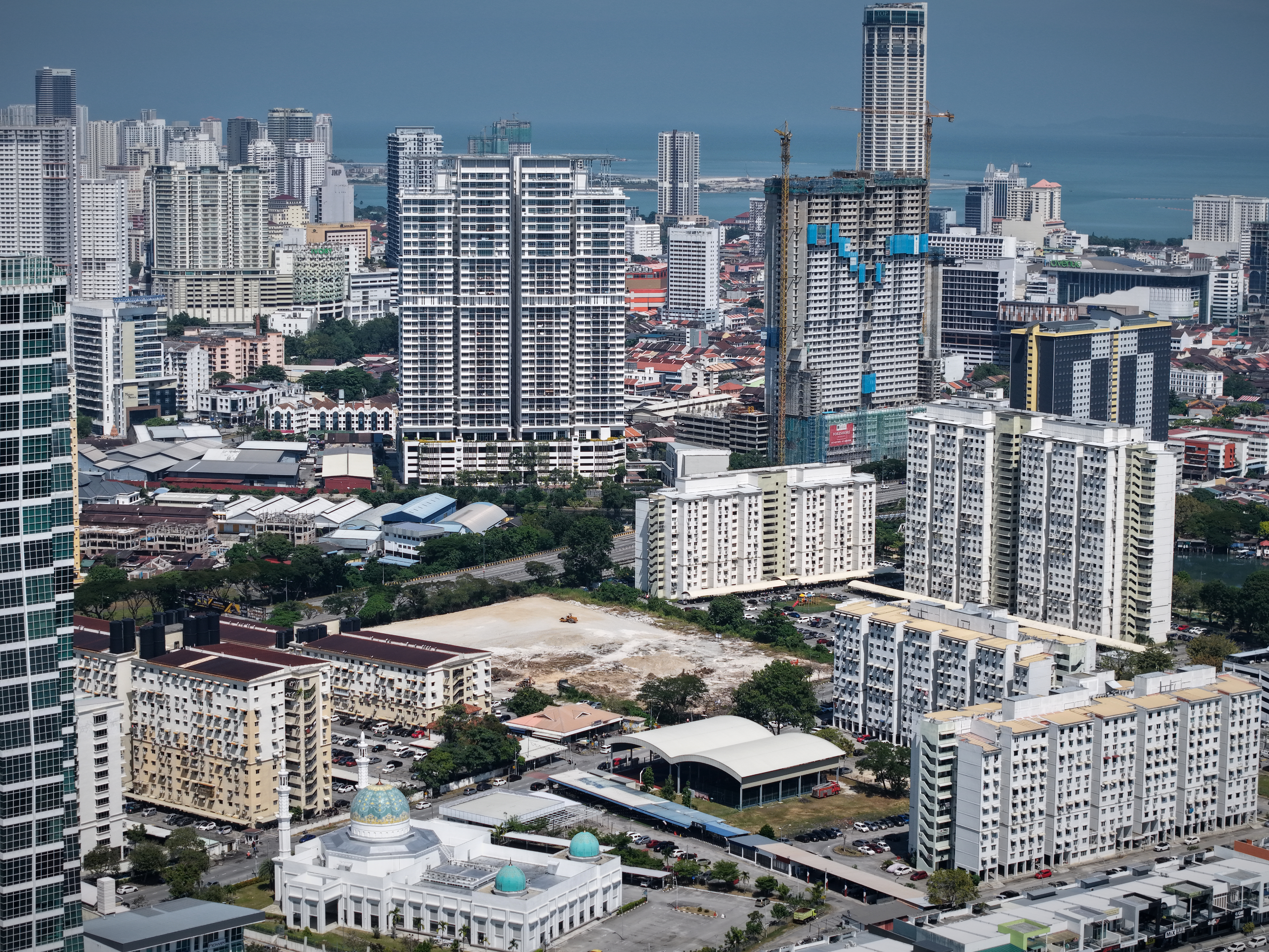
Cleared site of the Bandar Sri Pinang station as of January 2025

Construction is divided into three phases. SRS Consortium is responsible for the first segment – civil construction of the elevated section between the Komtar station and Silicon Island. The second phase consists of a 5.8 km (3.6 mi) cross-strait extension from the Macallum station to Penang Sentral at Butterworth, with an open tender anticipated to be called by July 2025. The cross-strait section will involve the construction of a bridge spanning shipping lanes, which necessitates negotiations between MRT Corp and the Penang Port Commission to ensure its design has sufficient clearance for cargo vessels. In December 2024, MRT Corp announced an open tender for the third phase, which seeks to appoint a turnkey contractor for the engineering, procurement, construction, testing, commissioning and maintenance of the rail system.

The Bandar Sri Pinang station was also announced as the first station scheduled for construction. A groundbreaking ceremony was held on 11 January 2025. Prime Minister Anwar, who presided over the ceremony, expressed hope that the LRT line preserves Penang's unique identity while setting "new standards for infrastructure in Malaysia", and reiterated its potential to "stimulate high-value investments, foster new industries, and bring economic benefits to Penang and the northern corridor as a whole". By June 2026, physical work had begun across the entire line, and construction is expected to intensify.

The line is expected to be operational by 2031.

== Planning and development ==
=== Transit-oriented development ===
The construction of the Mutiara Line has prompted discussion on transit-oriented development (TOD) along the urban corridor. In a 2026 monograph published by the Penang Institute, state assemblyman Joshua Woo Sze Zeng highlighted that the long-term impact of the line depends on integrating land-use, housing, and transport policies around its stations.

The study identified three primary conditions for effective TOD along the corridor: clustering mixed residential, commercial, and civic functions around station footprints; ensuring safe pedestrian access and feeder-bus links; and introducing private-vehicle demand management, such as parking reforms, once reliable transit alternatives are established. The paper advocated applying land value capture mechanisms—including public land leasing, development rights sales, and infrastructure levies—to reinvest accessibility gains into local infrastructure. It also addressed the complexity of urban land assembly in mature strata areas such as Jelutong, recommending structured relocation packages, tenant safeguards, and affordable-housing quotas to prevent residential displacement as property values rise around stations.

=== Potential extensions ===
In June 2026, MRT Corp mentioned that the line could potentially be extended to Tanjung Bungah at the north of the island, and to Bukit Mertajam and Batu Kawan on the mainland.

== Stations ==
LRT Mutiara Line alignment
LRT Mutiara Line route and stations. Click to enlarge.

The following stations were finalised by the Penang state government and Malaysia Rapid Transit Corporation (Note: Formerly Mass Rapid Transit Corporation Sdn Bhd) (Note: Formerly Mass Rapid Transit Corporation Sdn Bhd) as of November 2024.

Station service legend
Station contains parking for "park and ride" initiatives

Township	Station	Station Code	Platform type	Operation date	Transfers & Notes
Seberang Perai
Butterworth	Penang Sentral	S31	Terminus	c. 2031	KTM ETS; KTM Komuter North; 1 Ipoh–Butterworth line; 2 Padang Besar–Butterworth line; Penang ferry service; Rapid Penang public bus terminal: 17 Penang Sentral–Sungai Petani; 62 Penang Sentral–Kulim; 601 Penang Sentral–Kepala Batas; 603 Penang Sentral–Kuala Muda; 604 Penang Sentral–Taman Desa Murni; 605 Penang Sentral–Teluk Air Tawar; 613 Penang Sentral–Padang Serai; 701 Penang Sentral–Bukit Mertajam; 702 Penang Sentral–Bukit Mertajam (Permatang Pauh); 703 Penang Sentral–Seberang Jaya; 709 Penang Sentral–Machang Bubok; 801 Penang Sentral–Nibong Tebal; EB60 Penang Sentral–Sungai Petani; EB80 Penang Sentral–Parit Buntar
Butterworth	Jalan Bagan Luar	S30	Unknown	c. 2031	Provisional Station
Butterworth	Crossing across the Penang Strait				
George Town
City centre	Komtar	S20	Terminus	c. 2031	Tanjong Tokong line (proposed); Ayer Itam line (proposed); George Town tram line (proposed); Rapid Penang public bus terminal: 11 Weld Quay–Batu Lanchang; 12 Weld Quay–Bandar Sri Pinang; 101 Weld Quay–Teluk Bahang; 102 Teluk Bahang–Penang International Airport; 103 Komtar–Pulau Tikus–Komtar; 104 Komtar–Tanjong Bungah; 201 Weld Quay–Paya Terubong; 202 Weld Quay–Paya Terubong (Farlim); 203 Weld Quay–Ayer Itam; 204 Weld Quay–Penang Hill; 206 Weld Quay–Lotus's Tengku Kudin; 301 Weld Quay–Relau; 302 Weld Quay–Batu Maung; 303 Weld Quay–Bukit Gedung; 304 Gurney–Bukit Gedung; 306 General Hospital–Penang International Airport; 401 Weld Quay–Teluk Kumbar; 401E Weld Quay–Balik Pulau; 502 Weld Quay–Balik Pulau (Pekan Genting); CAT Congestion Alleviation Transport; CAT14 Komtar–Bukit Mertajam
City centre	Macallum	S19	Unknown	c. 2031	Interchange station to Komtar or Penang Sentral
City centre	Crossing across the Pinang River				
City centre	Bandar Sri Pinang	S18	Unknown	c. 2031	–
Jelutong	Sungai Pinang	S17	Unknown	c. 2031	Penang skycab system (proposed)
Jelutong	East Jelutong	S16	Unknown	c. 2031	–
Jelutong	Penang Waterfront	S15	Unknown	c. 2031	George Town–Butterworth line (proposed)
Gelugor	Gelugor	S14	Unknown	c. 2031	–
Gelugor	Jalan Universiti	S13	Unknown	c. 2031	Universiti Sains Malaysia
Bukit Jambul	Batu Uban	S12	Unknown	c. 2031	–
Bukit Jambul	Sungai Dua	S11	Unknown	c. 2031	Sungai Nibong bus terminal
Bukit Jambul	Branch towards rail depot				
Bukit Jambul	Sungai Nibong	S10	Unknown	c. 2031	–
Bukit Jambul	Bukit Jambul	S09	Unknown	c. 2031	–
Bayan Baru	SPICE	S08	Unknown	c. 2031	–
Bayan Baru	Jalan Tengah	S07	Unknown	c. 2031	–
Bayan Baru	FIZ North	S06	Unknown	c. 2031	–
Bayan Baru	FIZ South	S05	Unknown	c. 2031	–
Bayan Lepas	Sungai Tiram	S04	Unknown	c. 2031	–
Bayan Lepas	Penang International Airport	S03	Unknown	c. 2031	Penang International Airport
Bayan Lepas	Permatang Damar Laut	S02	Unknown	c. 2031	–
Bayan Lepas	Crossing across the Strait of Malacca				
Silicon Island	PSR-A	A01	Terminus	c. 2031	Provisional station

== See also ==
- Malaysian national projects
- Penang Transport Master Plan
- Rail transport in Malaysia
- Rapid Penang
- Transport in Penang
