= Transport in Penang =

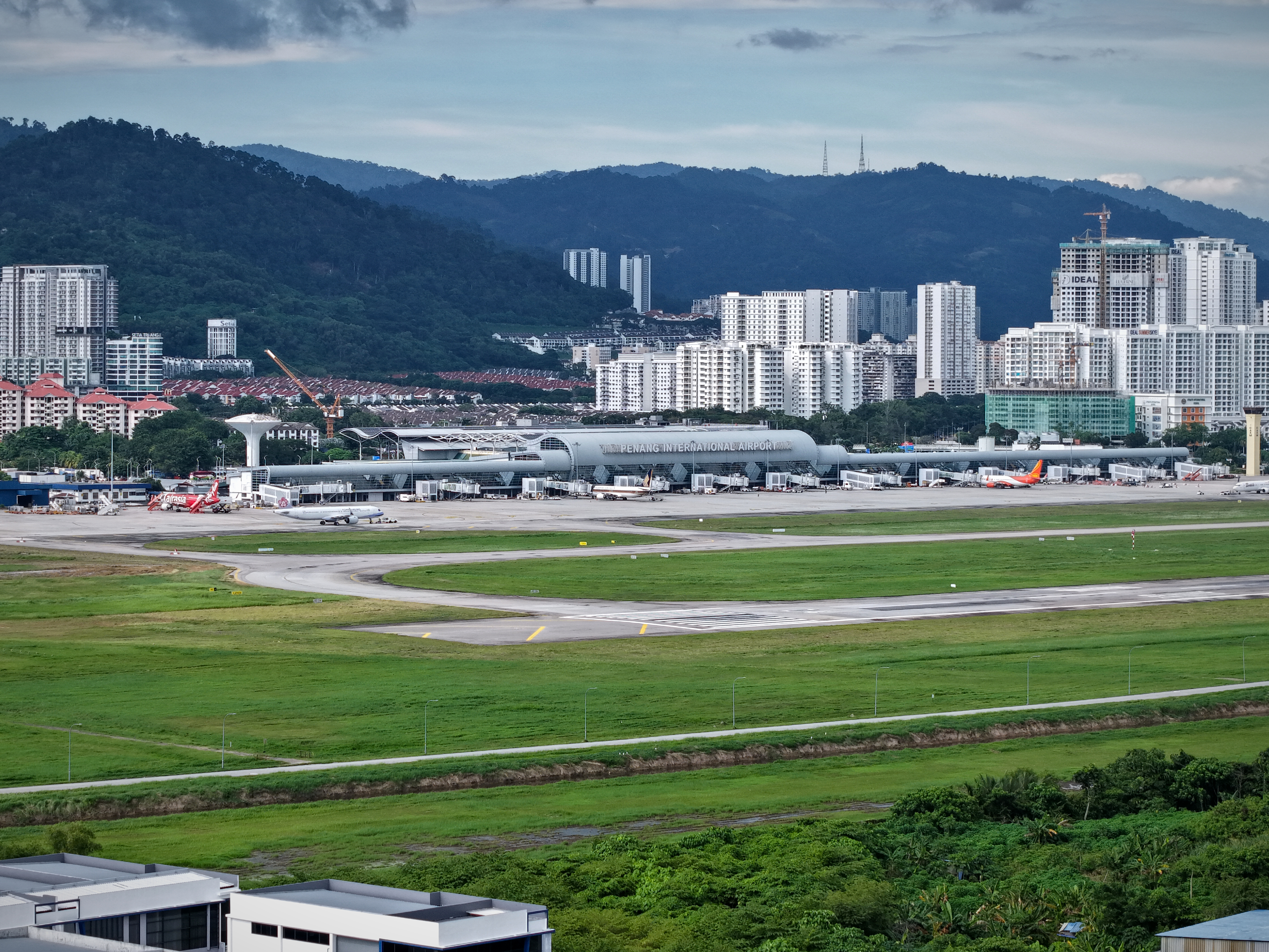
Penang International Airport has services to several major Asian cities, including Kuala Lumpur, Singapore, Hong Kong, Shanghai and Dubai.

As the core of Malaysia's second largest conurbation, Penang has a relatively developed transport infrastructure. The state is well-connected by land, air and sea. The Penang International Airport is Malaysia's second busiest by aircraft movements and the busiest by export volume, while the Port of Penang is the main transshipment hub of northern Malaysia. The island city of George Town is physically connected to mainland Seberang Perai by two road bridges and the oldest ferry service in the country. The North–South Expressway and Keretapi Tanah Melayu's west coast line – two major arteries along western Peninsular Malaysia – run through the state.

Within the state, Rapid Penang forms the backbone of urban public transport, operating public bus services throughout the conurbation. Penang Sentral serves as the main intermodal transport hub of northwestern Malaysia. The Penang Hill Railway is the only operational funicular railway system in the country. As part of additional investments in transport, a light rapid transit system, the Mutiara LRT, is expected to be completed by December 2031.

== Road transport ==
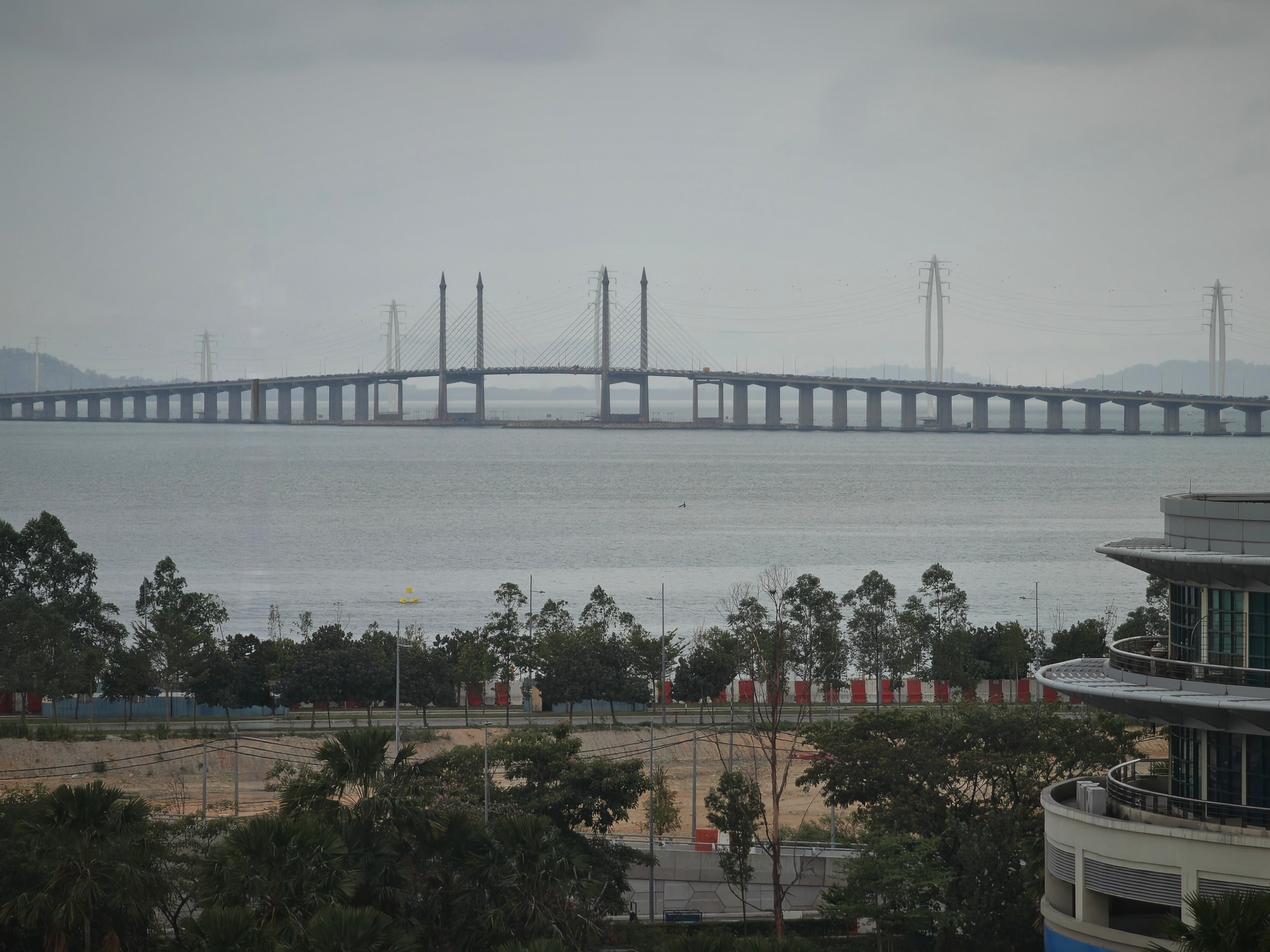
The Penang Bridge, with an overhead power grid in the background, c. 2025.

The first roads of George Town – Light, Beach, Chulia and Pitt streets – were created in a grid-like configuration soon after Francis Light founded the settlement in 1786. This urban planning method allowed for efficient division, transaction and assessment of land, as well as military deployment. Under the British, a network of roads was gradually extended across Penang Island.

In 1985, the 13.5 km (8.4 mi) Penang Bridge was completed, establishing the first physical connection between George Town and mainland Seberang Perai. In 2014, the 24 km (15 mi) Second Penang Bridge was opened to the south, becoming the longest bridge in Southeast Asia at that time.

Seberang Perai is accessible through the North-South Expressway, a 966 km (600 mi) expressway that stretches along the western part of Peninsular Malaysia. Major toll routes within Seberang Perai include the Butterworth Outer Ring Road (BORR) and the Butterworth-Kulim Expressway.

As of 2023, Penang's road system, excluding toll routes, measured 6,725.1 km (4,178.8 mi) in length. This included 187.4 km (116.4 mi) of federal roads, 3,497.3 km (2,173.1 mi) of state roads and 3,040.4 km (1,889.2 mi) of municipal roads. Within George Town, the Tun Dr Lim Chong Eu Expressway is a coastal highway that runs along the city's eastern seaboard, connecting the city centre with the two bridges. Federal Route 6 is a pan-island trunk road that circles the city, while the George Town Inner Ring Road is the main thoroughfare within the city centre.

=== Public buses ===
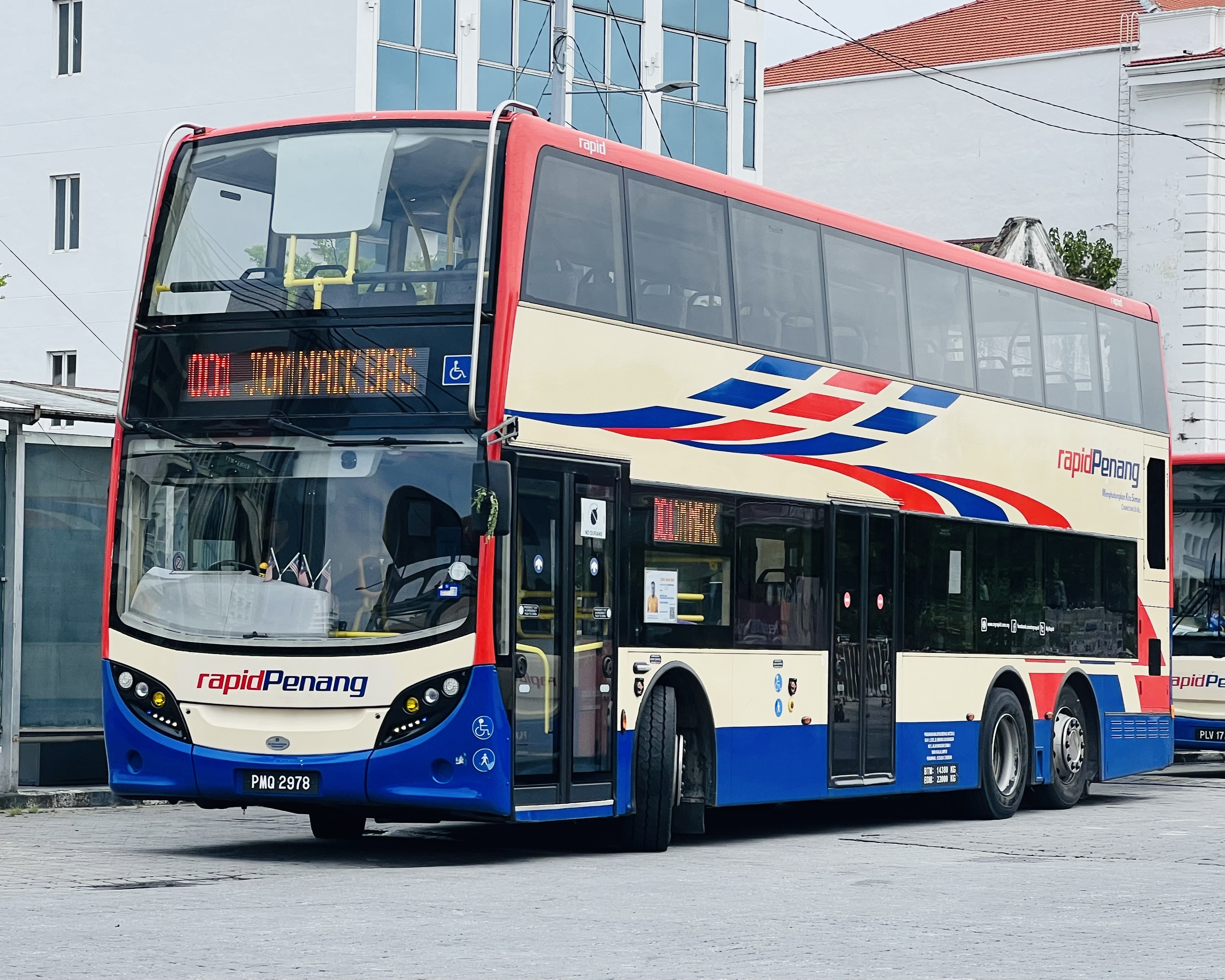
An Alexander Dennis Enviro500 MMC double decker operated by Rapid Penang

Trolleybuses were introduced in George Town in 1925, eventually replacing the existing tramlines by 1936. Following World War II, diesel-powered buses were also adopted. After the independence of Malaya, the George Town City Council (predecessor to the Penang Island City Council) initiated the replacement of trolleybuses with diesel-powered buses. The final trolleybus was retired in 1961, after which transit buses dominated Penang's public transport system.

Over time, Penang's public buses deteriorated due to financial mismanagement of the several competing private operators. In 2004, the Yellow Bus Company, one of the major public bus operators in the state, abruptly ceased operations. In 2006, the Penang state government, under Chief Minister Koh Tsu Koon, attempted to revive the public bus system by reassigning routes to designated operators. This initiative was unsuccessful, prompting Koh to request intervention from the Malaysian federal government.

In response, Prasarana Malaysia, a government-owned company, launched Rapid Penang in 2007. The service began with a fleet of 150 buses and has since expanded to become the sole public bus operator in Penang. As of 2025, Rapid Penang operates approximately 350 buses across 47 routes within the George Town Conurbation.

=== Interstate buses ===
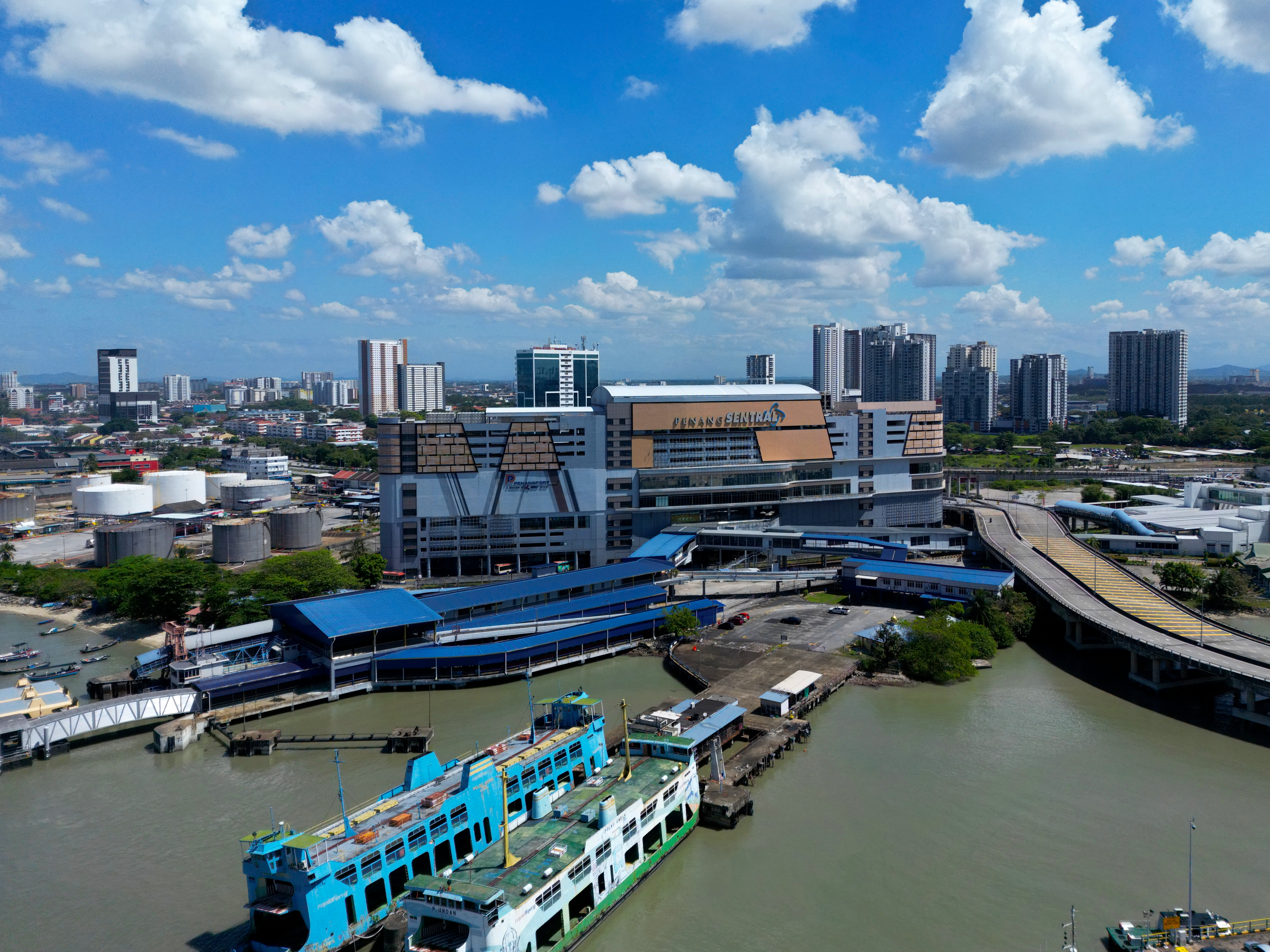
Penang Sentral in Seberang Perai

Interstate bus services operate from Penang Sentral, the main intermodal transport hub of northwestern Malaysia. Opened in 2018, the hub integrates Rapid Penang and interstate bus services, linking to the adjacent Butterworth railway station and the Sultan Abdul Halim Ferry Terminal. Nevertheless, some interstate bus services continue to operate from the Sungai Nibong Bus Terminal in George Town.

=== Bicycles ===
The trishaw was formerly one of the primary modes of transport within downtown George Town. Trishaws still ply the city's streets, albeit catering primarily to tourists.

To promote urban mobility, pedestrian and cycling infrastructure throughout Penang is being upgraded. In 2010, the Penang state government, under Chief Minister Lim Guan Eng, proposed the construction of 200 km (120 mi) of cycling paths throughout George Town. In 2016, George Town became the first city in Malaysia to operate a public bicycle-sharing service with the launch of LinkBike. As of 2021, LinkBike operated a fleet of 250 bicycles, available for rent from 29 stations throughout the city.

== Rail transport ==
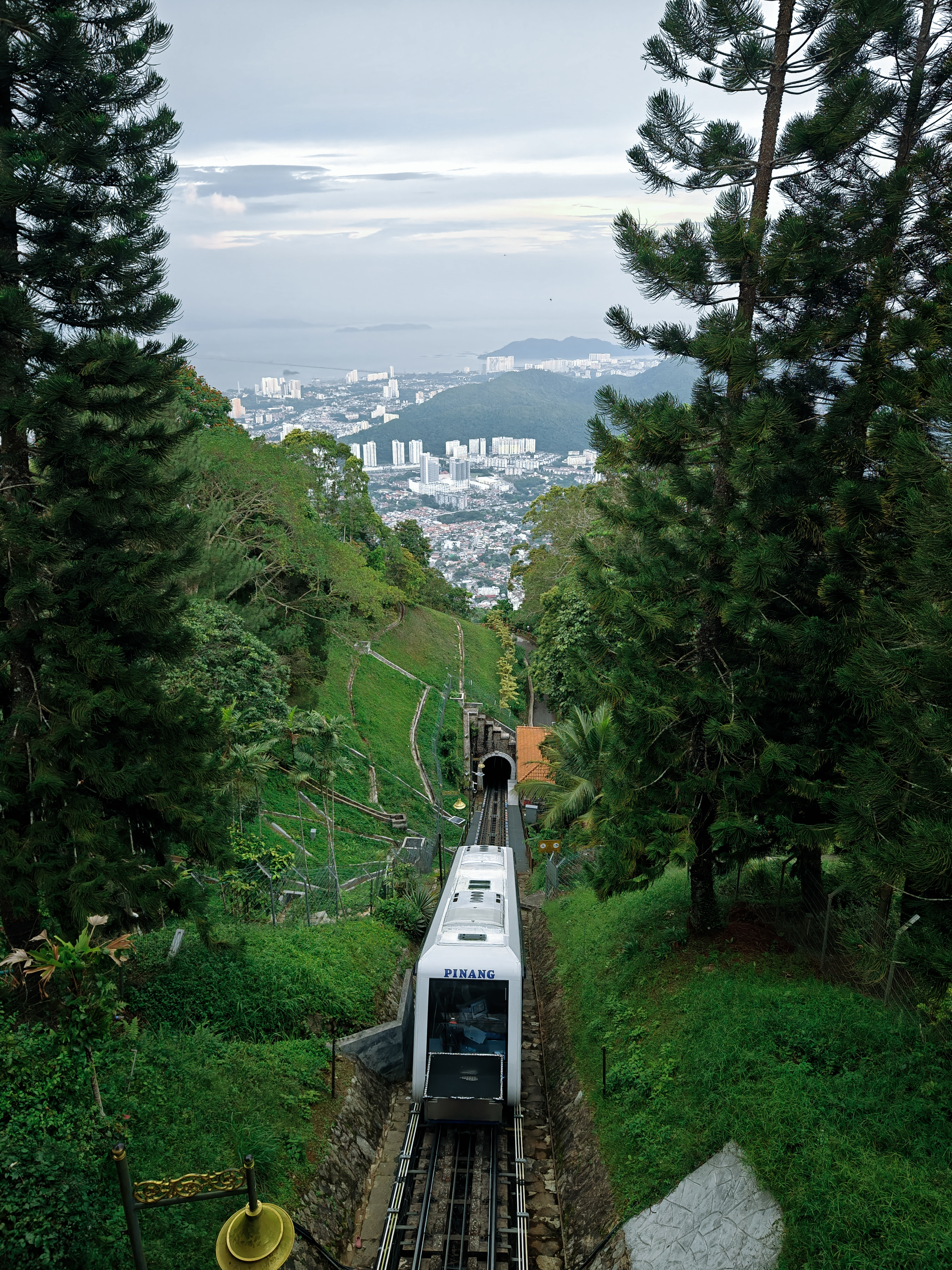
Penang Hill Railway

The first tramlines in George Town were established in the 1880s, connecting Weld Quay to Ayer Itam and Waterfall roads. The original tramline operated on a single-metre gauge and spanned a distance of 7.5 miles (12.1 km), using both steam trams and horse-drawn carriages. However, the tram service faced challenges, including irregular frequencies, which hindered its ability to compete with cheaper rickshaws. Electric trams replaced horse-drawn and steam trams by 1906, and remained in service until 1936.

In Seberang Perai, a railway was built by 1899, connecting Bukit Mertajam and Perai. By 1902, this railway was integrated with Perak's rail network via Nibong Tebal, before being extended northward into Kedah. The line ultimately became part of the West Coast line, which traverses the length of western Peninsular Malaysia. The railway is currently operated by Keretapi Tanah Melayu (KTM).

=== Interstate railway ===
The Butterworth railway station is the primary terminal for northwestern Malaysia. Apart from regular KTM services, Butterworth is one of the main stops of the Eastern & Oriental Express between Bangkok and Singapore. Other KTM stations within Seberang Perai include Tasek Gelugor, Bukit Tengah, Bukit Mertajam, Simpang Ampat and Nibong Tebal.

=== Funicular railway ===
The Penang Hill Railway is a funicular railway that ascends to the peak of Penang Hill in George Town. Completed in 1923, it is the only operational funicular system in Malaysia. The railway operates on some of the world's steepest gradients, with a slope angle of 27.9°. In 2022, the Penang Hill Railway recorded a ridership of 1.48 million passengers.

== Air transport ==
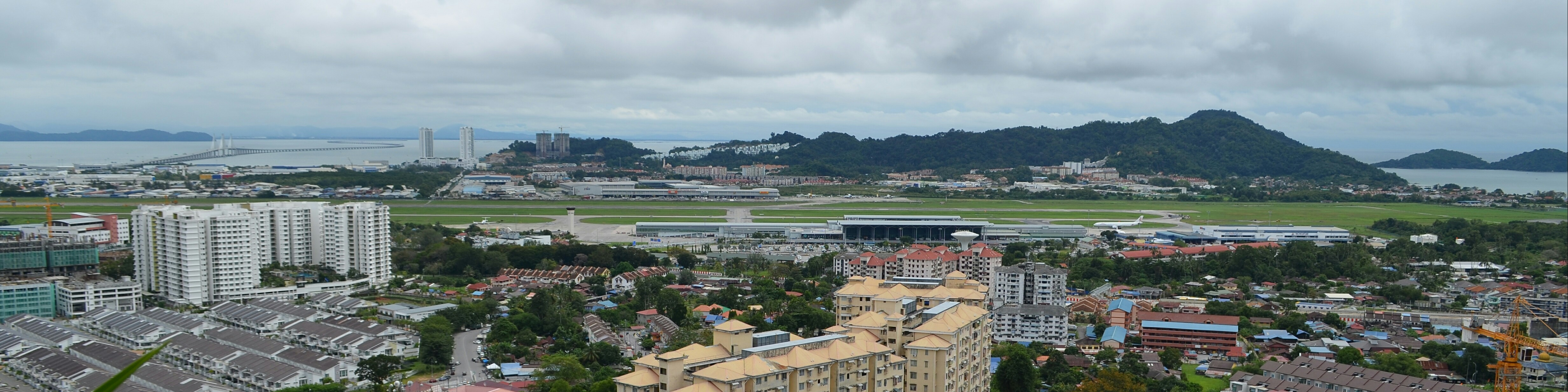
View of Penang International Airport and the Second Penang Bridge in 2017

The Penang International Airport (PIA) is situated 16 km (9.9 mi) south of downtown George Town. It is the main airport for northwestern Malaysia, with services to major regional cities including Kuala Lumpur, Singapore, Bangkok, Taipei, Hong Kong, Xiamen, Shanghai, Doha and Dubai. PIA is the second busiest airport in Malaysia in terms of aircraft movements after Kuala Lumpur International Airport and recorded over 7.6 million passengers in 2024. It is also Malaysia's second busiest in terms of cargo tonnage, handling more than 103,000 t (101,000 long tons; 114,000 short tons) within the same year. Additionally, it managed the highest export value of all entry points nationwide, totalling RM365 billion in 2023.

== Maritime transport ==
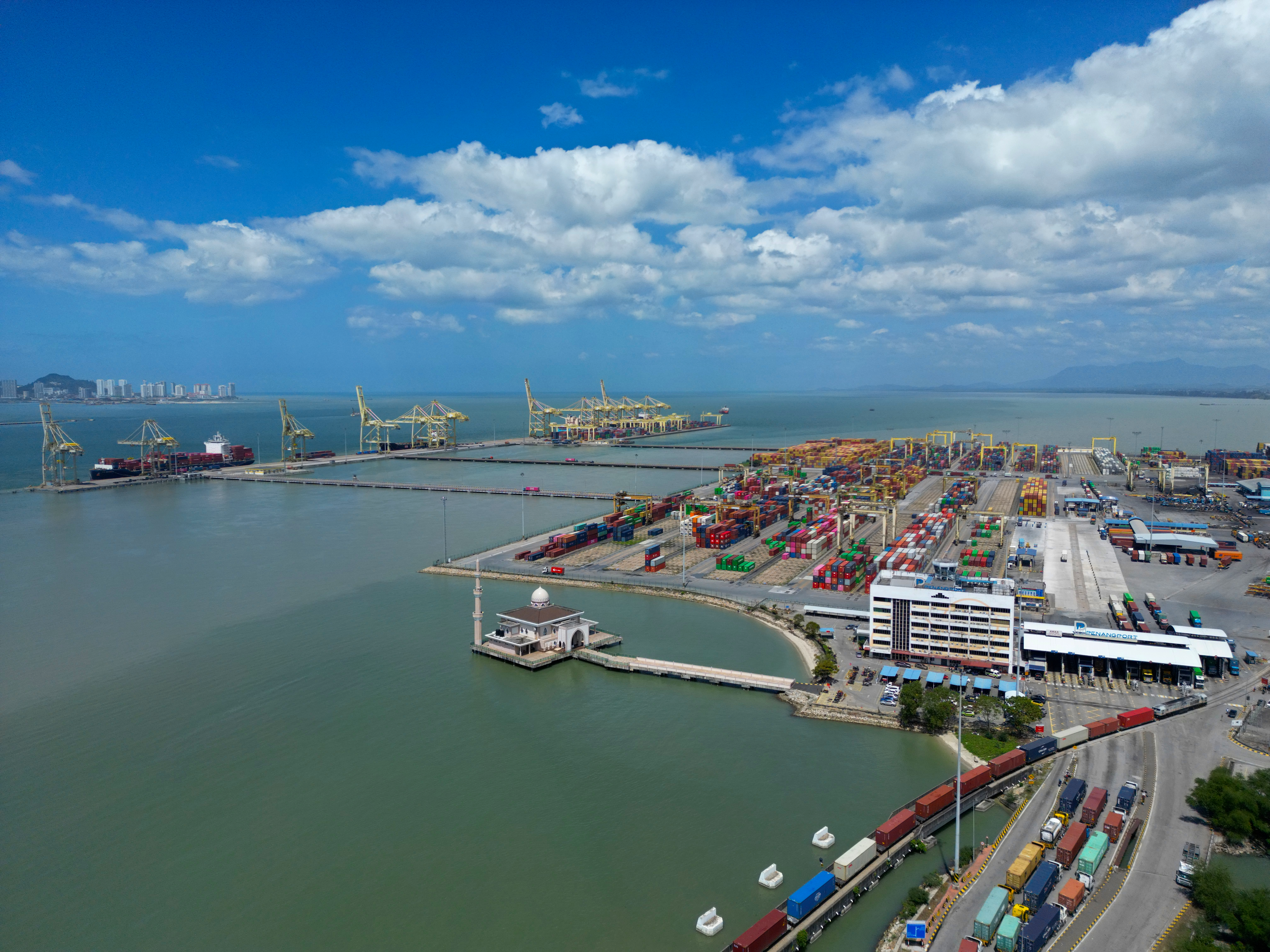
The Port of Penang was declared a Free Commercial Zone (FCZ) in 2021.

=== Ports and harbours ===
Penang was once a crucial British trading port, but its maritime trade saw a decline after George Town lost its free port status in 1969, coupled with the rise of Port Klang near Kuala Lumpur. Nevertheless, the Port of Penang remains the main harbour for northwestern Malaysia and southern Thailand. In 2024, it processed over 1.4 million TEUs of cargo, ranking it as the third busiest seaport in Malaysia. The port includes the North Butterworth Container Terminal (NBCT), the Perai Bulk Cargo Terminal (PBCT) and several smaller berthing facilities along the coast of Seberang Perai.

=== Passenger transport ===
A ferry off the Raja Tun Uda Ferry Terminal in George Town.

Swettenham Pier, located within downtown George Town, accommodates cruise ships and serves as a key entry point into the city. In 2017, it recorded 125 port calls, surpassing Port Klang as the busiest cruise shipping terminal in Malaysia. The pier is capable of accommodating some of the world's largest cruise liners, such as the Queen Mary 2, and hosts occasional visits from warships.

The cross-strait Penang ferry service is the oldest in Malaysia, originating from privately-run services established in 1894. It connects George Town and Seberang Perai, and was formerly the only transportation link between the island city and the mainland until the completion of the Penang Bridge in 1985. At present, four ferries ply the Penang Strait between both cities daily.

== Future developments ==
=== Rapid transit systems ===
In 1981, the Japan International Cooperation Agency (JICA) carried out a study focused on improving transportation infrastructure in Penang. Among others, the study recommended converting major roads into exclusive bus lanes, particularly along economically dense corridors connecting downtown George Town to Bayan Lepas and Butterworth to Bukit Mertajam. It also proposed the development of a new rail-based system linking downtown George Town with Bayan Lepas and Ayer Itam.

Subsequent studies were conducted by Universiti Sains Malaysia and Halcrow Group between 1996 and 1997 to further assess infrastructure development strategies. In 2002, the Penang state government, then led by Chief Minister Koh Tsu Koon, proposed a RM2 billion monorail project for George Town. The proposed monorail project garnered support from successive Malaysian prime ministers Mahathir Mohamad and Abdullah Ahmad Badawi. However, it was ultimately scrapped in 2008 after Pakatan Rakyat (predecessor to Pakatan Harapan) wrested control of Penang in the state election that year.

Newly elected Chief Minister Lim Guan Eng subsequently sought to address the underinvestment in transportation across Penang. The situation was exacerbated by a high rate of car ownership and worsening traffic congestion in the state. As of 2020, Penang had 2,772,378 private vehicles for a population of 1,740,405, resulting in a ratio of 1.59 vehicles per person. Traffic congestion was particularly severe along the downtown George Town–Bayan Lepas corridor, where average daily traffic reached 64,144 vehicles in 2018.

In 2009, the state government appointed a committee to develop a new transportation masterplan for the entire state. Two years later, AJC Planning Consultants, in partnership with Halcrow Group and Singapore Cruise Centre, were tasked with conducting new studies for this masterplan. Halcrow presented its findings in 2012, which included strategies for public transport, highway development, an accessibility report and recommendations for institutional reforms. These findings laid the groundwork for the Penang Transport Master Plan (PTMP), which proposed a RM10 billion light rapid transit (LRT) system and trams, as well as three new highways and an undersea tunnel to connect George Town and Seberang Perai.

In 2015, the Bayan Lepas LRT was announced, alongside the appointment of SRS Consortium as the Project Delivery Partner (PDP) for the PTMP. Since public transportation comes under the purview of the Malaysian federal government, the state government submitted the proposed system to the federal Ministry of Transport for approval in 2016. However, due to political tensions between the federal and state governments, the proposed LRT line only secured federal funding in 2023, under Prime Minister Anwar Ibrahim's administration. The Bayan Lepas LRT was subsequently renamed the Mutiara LRT after the federal government assumed control of the project from the state. Construction of the line, the first domestic light rail system outside the Klang Valley, commenced in 2025 and is expected to be complete by 2031.

=== Aerial lift transport ===
In 2019, then federal Minister of Finance Lim Guan Eng announced a cable car system to complement the existing Penang Hill Railway, which had seen a ridership of 1.74 million in 2018. This proposal aimed to reduce reliance on the railway. However, a political crisis in 2020 led to the cancellation of federal funds for the project. Despite this, Chief Minister Chow Kon Yeow pushed ahead with formulating a public–private partnership framework for the proposed system. The cable car project eventually gained approval from federal environmental regulators in 2024. Construction of the Penang Hill cable car system has commenced and is anticipated to be complete by 2026.
