= Komtar station =

Future light rail station in Penang, Malaysia

Komtar
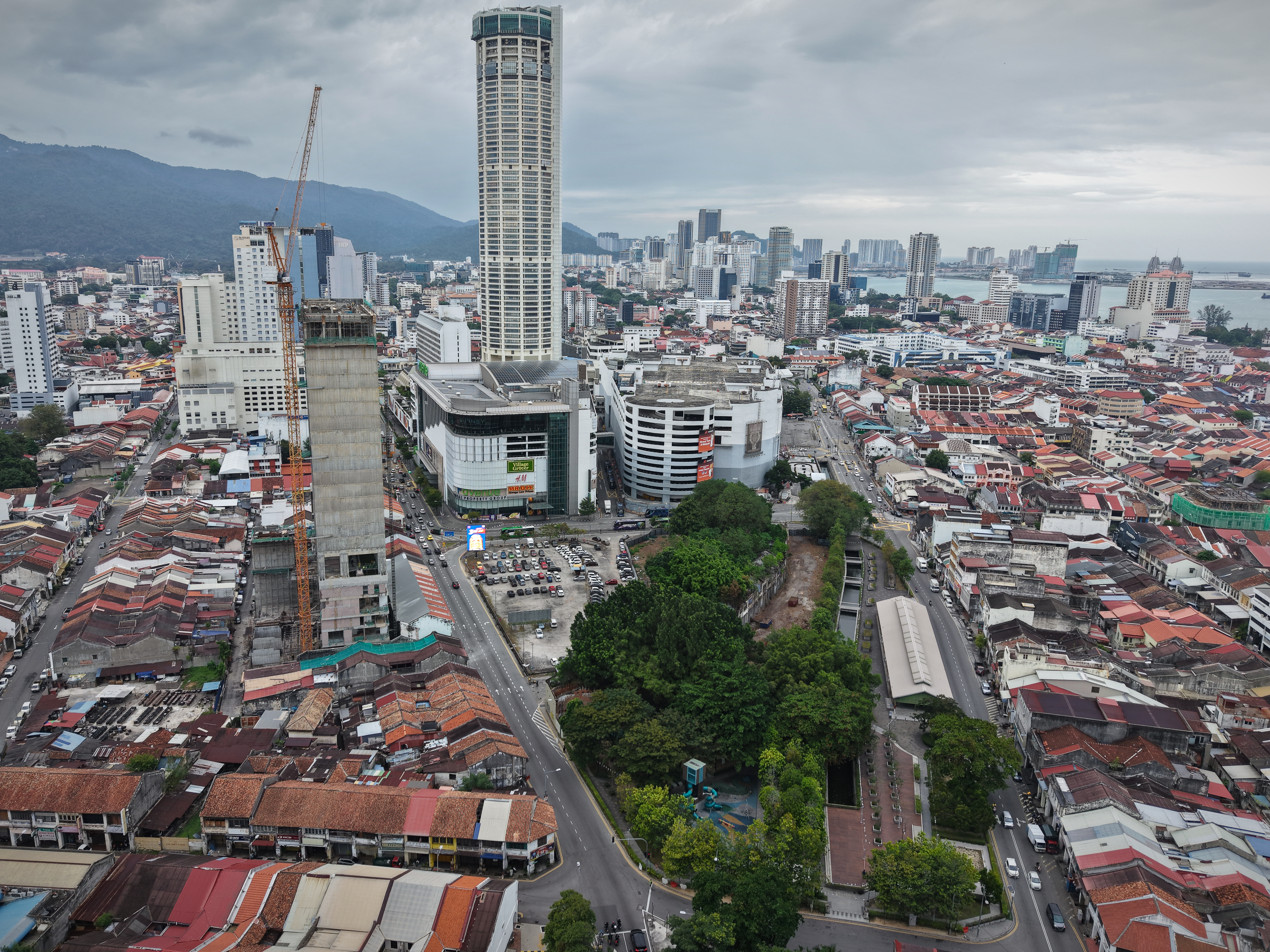
- Site of the station as of January 2025

General information
- Location: Magazine Road; George Town, Penang
- Coordinates: 5.4124336°N 100.3324157°E
- System: LRT and monorail terminal
- Owner: Mass Rapid Transit Corporation
- Lines: Mutiara line; Tanjong Tokong line; Ayer Itam line
- Connections: George Town tram system Rapid Penang public bus system: 101, 102, 103, 104, 201, 201*, 202, 203, 204, 206, 301, 302, 303, 304, 306, 401E, 502, CAT, CAT14, CAT HOSPITAL

Construction
- Structure type: Elevated

History
- Opened: 2031; 5 years' time
Location

The Komtar station is a future elevated light rail transit station on the Mutiara line in George Town, Penang. It will be situated at the intersection of Magazine Road, Carnavon and Tek Soon streets, adjacent to the Sia Boey Park.

The station is projected to become a major terminal and interchange station of the Mutiara, Tanjong Tokong and the Ayer Itam lines. It has connections towards the terminal of a proposed tram system in George Town, and the Komtar bus terminal, which serves as the primary public bus terminal serving the city.

The station complex is also planned as part of the fifth phase of development at Komtar. Once completed, it is expected to become the main rail station in George Town. Besides this, the station is part of the western end of an elevated link across the Penang Strait towards the Penang Sentral station in Seberang Perai. Construction is expected to be completed by 2031, in line with the completion of the Mutiara line.

== History ==
The site of the Komtar station was previously part of the historic Sia Boey Market, which emerged in 1806 as one of the busiest street markets in central George Town. During the initial planning of the Penang Urban Centre between 1969 and 1970, the site around Sia Boey Market was designated for demolition and replacement under the project's fifth phase of development. After the project evolved into Komtar, the land which the market stood upon was sold in July 1991 for RM31 million, although no progress was done, despite plans for a mixed retail, office, and residential development set for construction in 1995 or 1996.

=== Planning ===
In 2002, the Penang state government repurposed Sia Boey Market into a centralised transportation hub, with a terminal of a proposed light rail transit line in Penang Island, a precursor to the present Mutiara line. In 2004, anticipating the construction of the transit line, Sia Boey Market closed permanently. However, the project stalled and was never revived to its previous state. In 2012, the site was planned for the construction of an arts district known as the Penang Heritage Square, but progress halted when the arts district was relocated to Macallum Street Ghaut nearby to make way for another integrated transport hub. This revival did not succeed, and by the mid-2010s the project stalled again due to funding concerns and political opposition from the federal government.

The introduction of the Penang Transport Master Plan (PTMP) in 2015 designated the Komtar station as a major interchange station and terminal of several proposed light rail transit and monorail routes. It functions as the terminus station of the Mutiara line, the Tanjong Tokong line, Ayer Itam line, and the George Town tram line. Further redesigns of the Mutiara line made the Komtar station the western end of an elevated rail bridge across the Penang Strait towards a station at Penang Sentral at Seberang Perai. Construction of the station is expected to be complete by 2031.

== Layout ==
=== Rail services ===
The Komtar station is proposed to be served by the following rail lines:

Train line
Direction and next station
Mutiara line
Southbound towards Macallum (Downtown George Town) →
Eastbound towards Penang Sentral (Seberang Perai) →
Tanjong Tokong line

(southern terminus)

Northbound towards Pykett (Downtown George Town) ←
Ayer Itam line

(eastern terminus)

Westbound towards Times Square (Downtown George Town) →

=== Connections ===
The Komtar station is proposed to be connected to the following stations:

- George Town tram line (western terminus): Eastbound towards Carnavon Street
- Rapid Penang public bus terminal (Komtar Bus Terminal): 101, 102, 103, 104, 201, 201*, 202, 203, 204, 206, 301, 302, 303, 304, 306, 401E, 502, CAT, CAT14, CAT HOSPITAL
