= Tanjong Tokong line =

Proposed light rail transit line in Penang, Malaysia

Tanjung Tokong line
- Route alignment of the line

Overview
- Status: Proposed
- Owner: Mass Rapid Transit Corporation
- Locale: Penang
- Termini: Komtar; Tanjung Tokong
- Stations: 8
- Website: penanginfra.com

Service
- Type: Light rapid transit or monorail
- Depot(s): Unknown

History
- Planned opening: To be announced

Technical
- Line length: 7 km (4.3 mi)
- Character: At-grade and elevated
- Track gauge: Unknown

The Tanjong Tokong line, also spelt as the Tanjung Tokong line, is a proposed light rail transit or monorail system in Penang. The 7 kilometres (4.3 mi) line is planned to connect George Town's city centre with its northern suburb of Tanjong Tokong. The line will have eight stations, with potential extensions towards Tanjong Bungah and Batu Ferringhi.

The line is a component of the Penang Transport Master Plan, and will interchange with the under-construction Mutiara line and proposed Ayer Itam line. Along with the Mutiara line, the line may be part of the northern end of Penang's first light rail transit alignment from Bayan Lepas to Tanjong Bungah.

Following the federal takeover of the Mutiara line, the Tanjong Tokong line is planned to be incorporated into a future extension of the Mutiara line.

== Station listing ==
There are eight stations proposed over the 7 kilometres (4.3 mi) route of the Tanjong Tokong line. The line's southern terminus is located at Komtar, while its northern terminus is located at Tanjong Tokong.

=== List of stations ===
Station service legend
Station contains parking for "park and ride" initiatives

Locality	Station	Platform type	Operation date	Transfers
City centre	Komtar	Unknown	c. 2030	MTL Mutiara line (under construction); Ayer Itam line (proposed); George Town tram line (proposed) Rapid Penang public bus terminal: 11 Weld Quay–Batu Lanchang; 12 Weld Quay–Bandar Sri Pinang; 101 Weld Quay–Teluk Bahang; 102 Teluk Bahang–Penang International Airport; 103 Komtar–Pulau Tikus–Komtar; 104 Komtar–Tanjong Bungah; 201 Weld Quay–Paya Terubong; 201* Weld Quay–Paya Terubong–Weld Quay; 202 Weld Quay–Paya Terubong (Farlim); 203 Weld Quay–Ayer Itam; 204 Weld Quay–Penang Hill; 206 Weld Quay–Tesco Jalan Tengku Kudin; 301 Weld Quay–Relau; 302 Weld Quay–Batu Maung; 303 Weld Quay–Bukit Gedung; 304 Gurney–Bukit Gedung; 306 General Hospital–Penang International Airport; 401 Weld Quay–Teluk Kumbar; 401E Weld Quay–Balik Pulau; 502 Weld Quay–Balik Pulau (Pekan Genting); CAT Congestion Alleviation Transport; CAT14 Komtar–Bukit Mertajam
City centre	Pykett	Unknown	c. 2030	–
City centre	Jalan Sultan Ahmad Shah	Unknown	c. 2030	–
City centre	Kelawai	Unknown	c. 2030	Rapid Penang public bus station: 101 Weld Quay–Teluk Bahang; 102 Penang International Airport–Teluk Bahang; 103 Komtar–Pulau Tikus–Komtar; 104 Komtar–Tanjong Bungah; 304 Bukit Gedung–Gurney
City centre	Gurney Paragon	Unknown	c. 2030	Rapid Penang public bus station: 101 Weld Quay–Teluk Bahang; 102 Penang International Airport–Teluk Bahang; 103 Komtar–Pulau Tikus–Komtar; 104 Komtar–Tanjong Bungah
City centre	Gurney Drive	Unknown	c. 2030	Rapid Penang public bus station: 101 Weld Quay–Teluk Bahang; 102 Penang International Airport–Teluk Bahang
Tanjong Tokong	Island Plaza	Unknown	c. 2030	Rapid Penang public bus station: 101 Weld Quay–Teluk Bahang; 102 Penang International Airport–Teluk Bahang
Tanjong Tokong	Tanjong Pinang	Unknown	c. 2030	Rapid Penang public bus station: 101 Weld Quay–Teluk Bahang; 102 Penang International Airport–Teluk Bahang
Tanjong Tokong	Tanjong Tokong	Unknown	c. 2030	–

== See also ==
- Rapid Penang
- Kelana Jaya line
