= Silicon Island =

Artificial island in Penang, Malaysia

Native name: Pulau Silikon
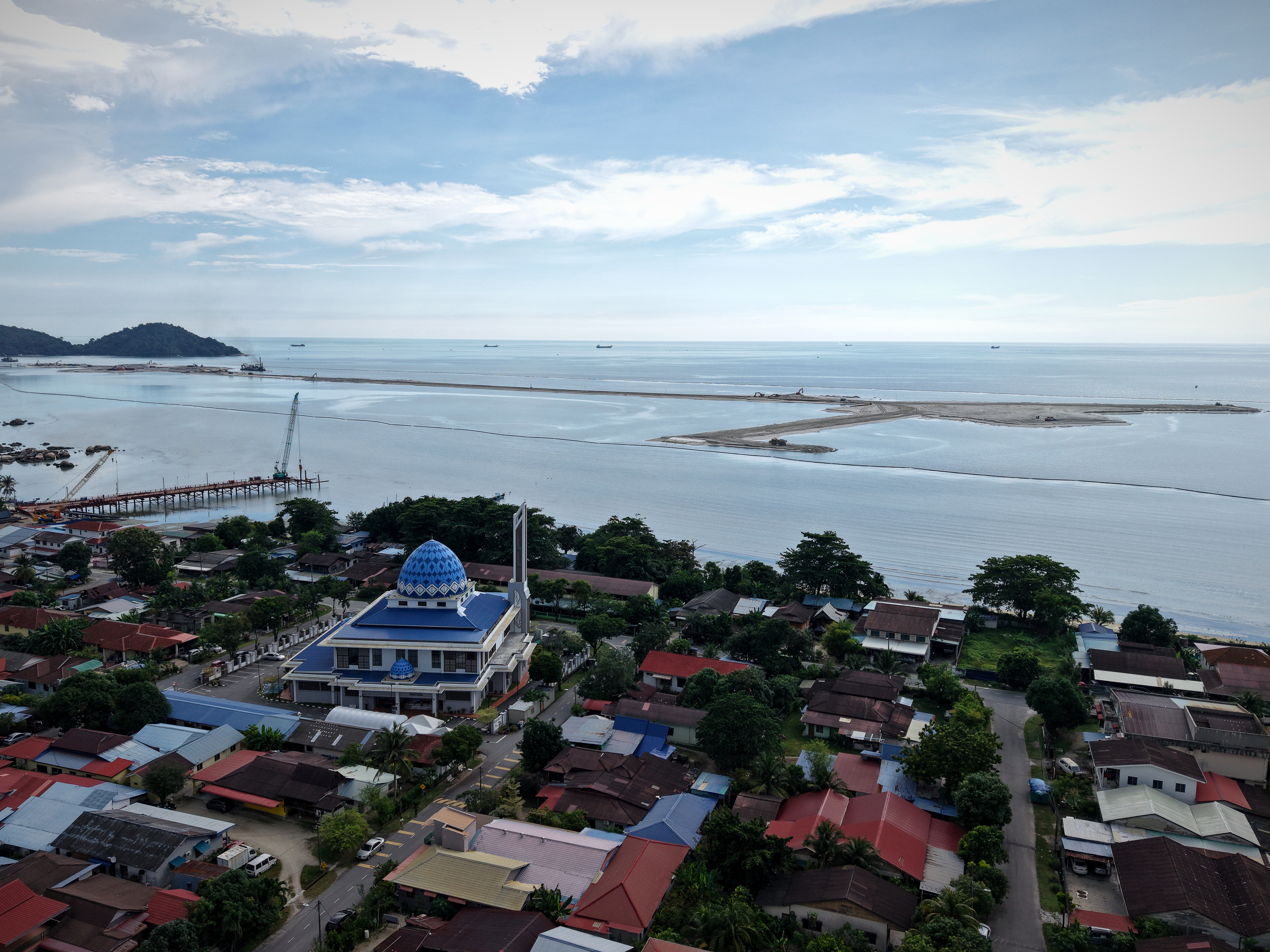

Geography
- Location: Strait of Malacca
- Coordinates: 5°15′36″N 100°16′07″E
- Type: Artificial island
- Archipelago: Malay Archipelago
- Area: 2,300 acres (930 ha)

Administration
- Malaysia
- State: Penang
- City: George Town
- District: Southwest
- Mukim: Bayan Lepas

Silicon Island is a man-made islet currently under reclamation off the southern coast of Penang Island in the Malaysian state of Penang. It is located 350 m (1,150 ft) off the shoreline of Penang Island and lies within the jurisdiction of George Town.

Although ongoing reclamation works for Silicon Island officially commenced in 2023, the project, part of the Penang South Islands (PSI) master plan, had been in planning since 2015, and faced delays due to socioeconomic concerns and political developments. Silicon Island will cover an area of 2,300 acres (930 ha) and is intended to serve as an extension of the Bayan Lepas Free Industrial Zone (Bayan Lepas FIZ). Reclamation of the island is targeted to be completed by 2032.

== History ==
=== Background ===
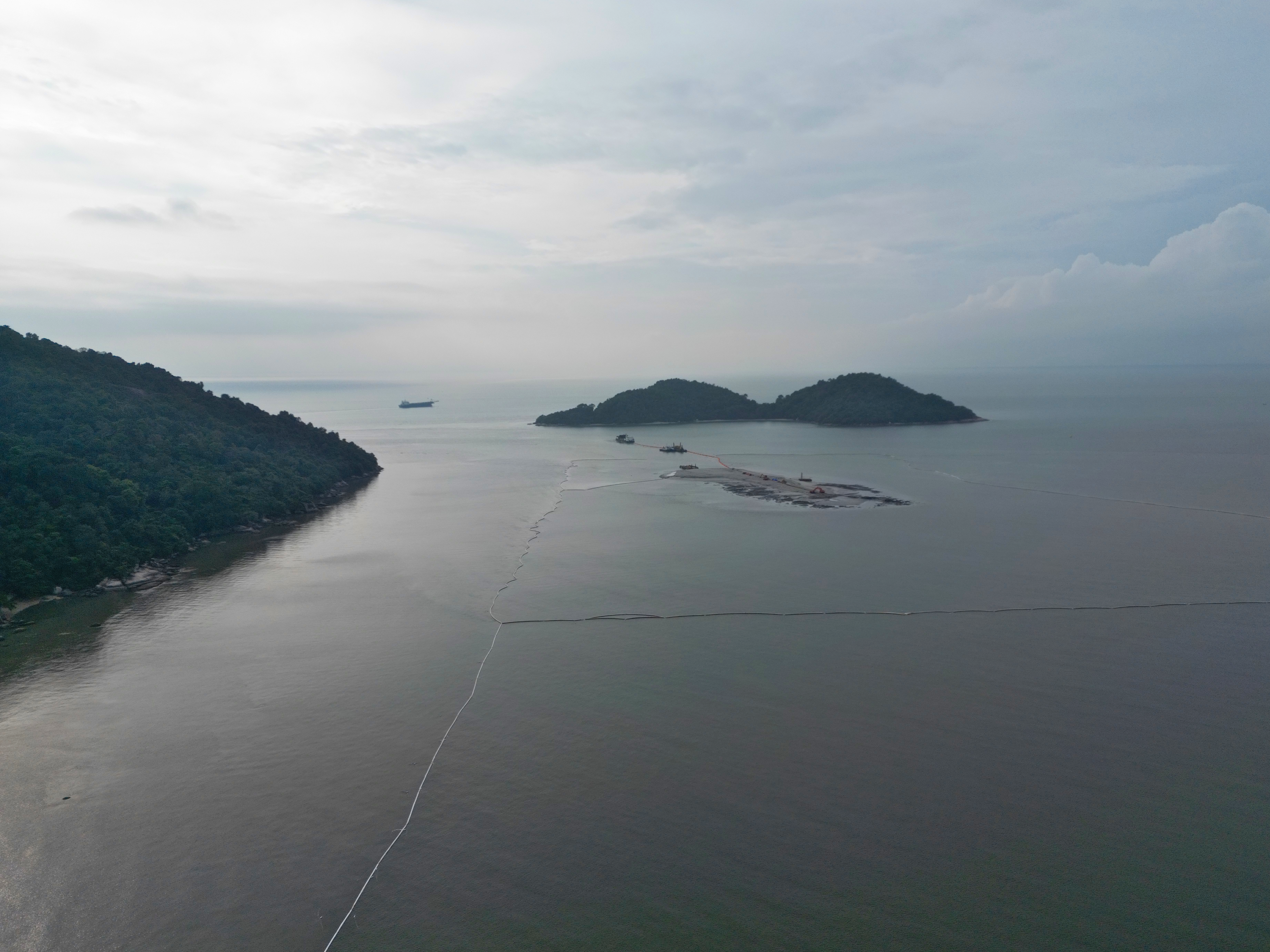
Silicon Island c. 2023

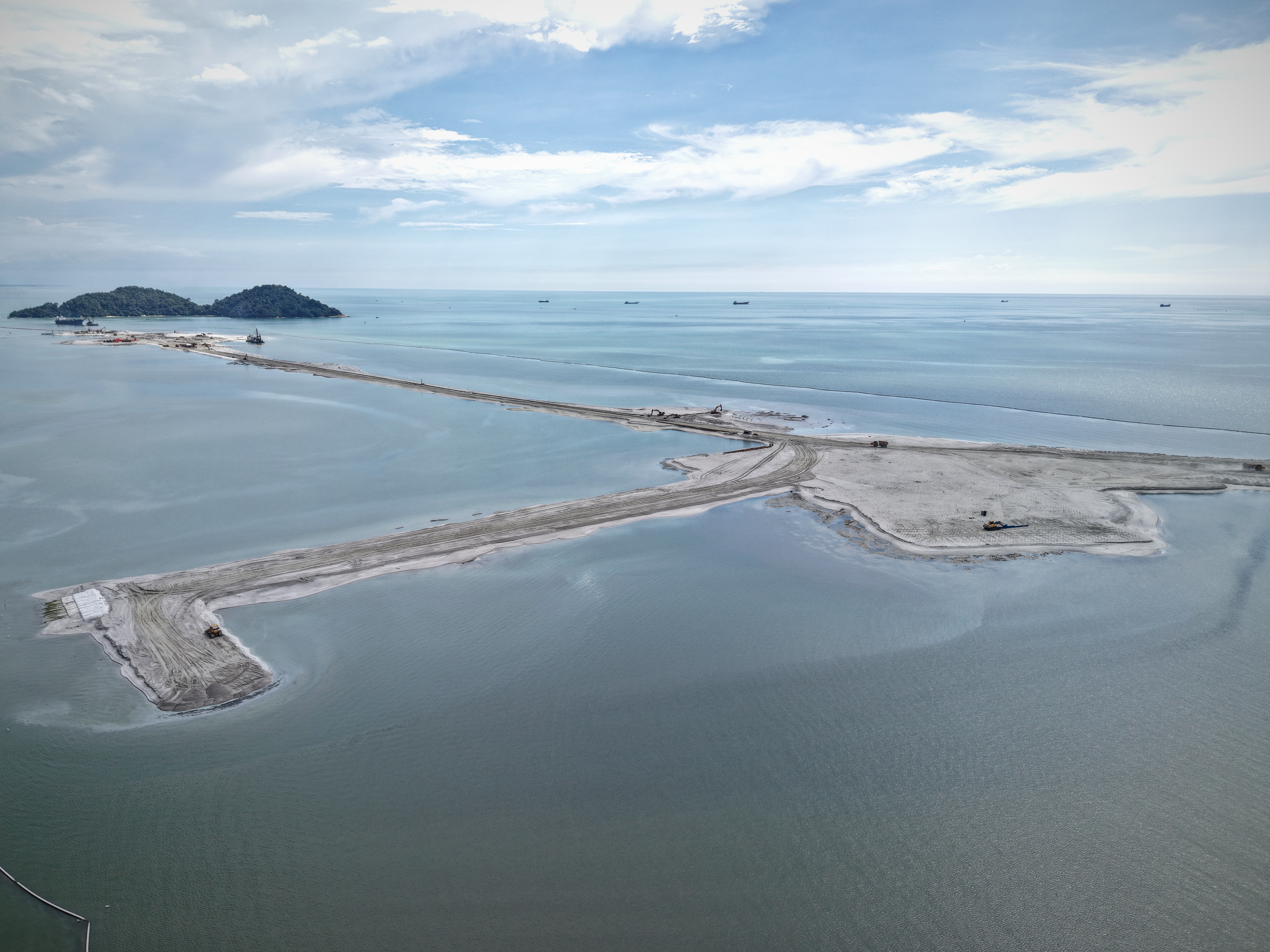
Silicon Island c. 2024

In 2015, the Penang state government announced the Penang Transport Master Plan (PTMP) to upgrade the state's transportation infrastructure. However, funding the PTMP became a contentious issue, as at that point, Penang was an opposition state governed by the Pakatan Rakyat bloc (now Pakatan Harapan). The Najib Razak administration had ignored requests by the state government to fund new public transport infrastructure within Penang. To finance the PTMP, it was originally proposed that the Project Delivery Partner (PDP) be granted reclamation rights for 1,500 acres (610 ha) of land around Gazumbo Island in the Penang Strait. However, the state government subsequently retracted the proposal due to concerns about the potential ecological impact on the area.

In November that year, Chow Kon Yeow, who was the Local Government, Traffic Management and Flood Mitigation Executive Councillor, confirmed that the southern coast of Penang Island had been identified for land reclamation to fund the PTMP. Reclamation of the area was projected to bring a five-fold economic multiplier effect, estimated at RM100 billion, and would provide additional space for any expansion of the Bayan Lepas Free Industrial Zone (Bayan Lepas FIZ).

SRS Consortium, consisting of Gamuda Berhad as the majority shareholder, Penang-based Loh Phoy Yen Holdings and Ideal Property Development, was appointed as the PDP for the PTMP. Following the appointment, the Penang South Reclamation (PSR) scheme was introduced, involving the reclamation of three islets off southern Penang Island. The reclaimed islets would be fully owned by the state government and auctioned off to finance the PTMP. The state government estimated that the sale of the reclaimed islets could generate RM70 billion in revenue and cover the cost of PTMP.

=== Receiving government support ===
An Environmental Impact Assessment (EIA) for the PSR was submitted to federal regulators in 2017. The EIA was rejected in 2018 due to shortcomings in the Fisheries Impact Assessment (FIA).

The PSR became a political issue during the elections that year, with the incumbent Barisan Nasional (BN) federal government – led by Najib – opposing the reclamation project on the grounds of safeguarding the livelihoods of affected fishermen. The PSR, along with the PTMP, was included in Pakatan Harapan's (PH) 68-point election manifesto for Penang. Following PH's electoral victory, there was an expectation that the PSR and PTMP would both receive federal approval.

A revised EIA was submitted in 2019 and subsequently granted conditional approval by federal regulators, which included an 18-point advisory aimed at mitigating potential impacts on the local community. In 2020, the PSR was rebranded as the Penang South Islands (PSI). Concurrently, a design competition was held, which was won by a multidisciplinary team that included Bjarke Ingels Group, Hijjas Kasturi Associates and Ramboll.

=== Opposition and political tussle ===
Nevertheless, opposition from some fishermen and special interest groups persisted, leading to an appeal to the federal Department of Environment (DOE). Opponents of the PSI also aligned themselves with the right-wing Malaysian Islamic Party (PAS) to pressure the state government to abandon the PSI. In 2021, the DOE rescinded its approval for the PSI's EIA. The state government, in response, sought a judicial review to contest the DOE's decision, while preparing a revised EIA for approval.

The federal election in 2022 resulted in a unity government headed by PH chairman Anwar Ibrahim. In April 2023, federal regulators regranted approval for the PSI, after which the state government withdrew its appeal for judicial review. In May, Prime Minister Anwar announced federal funding to expedite the development of the Mutiara LRT, one of the key components of the PTMP. Following Anwar's request to reevaluate the PSI, the state government, under Chief Minister Chow, decided to scale down the project from three to one islet. The remaining islet was rebranded as "Silicon Island".

Ahead of the 2023 state election, Perikatan Nasional, of which PAS is a member, pledged to scrap the PSI if elected to power. Ultimately, a PH–BN coalition retained control of the state government.

=== Reclamation works ===
Reclamation of Silicon Island commenced in September 2023, employing hydraulic sand fill along with prefabricated vertical drains and surcharge for ground treatment. The islet is being reclaimed to a minimum elevation of 3 m (9.8 ft) above sea level to mitigate the effects of high tides and storm surges. As of December 2024, 28 hectares (69 acres) of land had been created, with land designated for the Mutiara LRT depot expected to be completed by the end of 2025. State government officials have set a reclamation target of 300 to 400 acres (120 to 160 hectares) annually starting in 2025, with the islet expected to be fully reclaimed by 2032.

== See also ==
- Andaman Island
- List of islands of Malaysia
