= Komtar (disambiguation) =

Komtar is a civic complex in George Town, Penang.

Komtar may also refer to:

- Komtar station, proposed light rail transit station
- Komtar (state constituency)
- Komtar JBCC, shopping mall and office complex in Johor Bahru
