= Penang Transport Master Plan =

Transportation plan of the Penang state government

The Penang Transport Master Plan (abbrev. PTMP) is a strategic initiative developed by the Penang state government between 2012 and 2015, aimed at creating an integrated transportation system across the state. The multimodal plan, with an original estimated cost of RM27 billion, includes the introduction of urban rail lines and the construction of additional expressways to address the growing population density in Penang. As of 2025, some elements of the master plan are being implemented, including the Mutiara LRT and the Ayer Itam–Tun Dr Lim Chong Eu Expressway Bypass.

== Background ==
Penang had a population density of 1,659/km^{2} (4,300/sq mi) as of 2020, the highest of all Malaysian states, and ranked as the second most urbanised state with an urbanisation level of 92.5%. Within Penang, George Town had a population density of approximately 2,596/km^{2} (6,720/sq mi), making it one of the most densely populated cities in Malaysia.

This, combined with the high level of vehicle ownership, exacerbates traffic congestion within the state. As of 2020, Penang recorded 2,772,378 private vehicles for a population of 1,740,405, resulting in a ratio of 1.59 vehicles per person. Traffic congestion was particularly pronounced along the downtown George Town–Bayan Lepas corridor, where average daily traffic reached 64,144 vehicles in 2018.

In 1981, the Japan International Cooperation Agency (JICA) conducted a study aimed at enhancing transportation infrastructure in Penang, recommending the conversion of major roads into exclusive bus lanes, and the development of a rail system linking downtown George Town with Bayan Lepas and Ayer Itam. Subsequent studies by Universiti Sains Malaysia and Halcrow Group from 1996 to 1997 further evaluated these strategies. In 2002, the Penang state government, under then Chief Minister Koh Tsu Koon, proposed a RM2 billion monorail project for George Town. Although the proposal received support from successive Malaysian prime ministers Mahathir Mohamad and Abdullah Ahmad Badawi, it was eventually scrapped by 2008 after Pakatan Rakyat (predecessor to the present-day Pakatan Harapan coalition) wrested control of Penang in the state election that year.

== History ==
In 2009, the Penang Transport Council (PTC), which included non-governmental organisations (NGOs) and state executive councillors, proposed that the state government develop a master plan for long-term statewide transportation planning. The master plan was expected to encompass the construction of additional expressways, the implementation of a one-way street traffic management system and the adoption of an intelligent transportation system. By 2010, a tender was issued to appoint consultants to conceptualise the master plan.

In 2011, AJC Planning Consultants, in partnership with Halcrow Group and Singapore Cruise Centre, were tasked with conducting new studies for this masterplan. Halcrow presented its findings in the following year, which included strategies for public transport, highway development, an accessibility report and recommendations for institutional reforms. The Halcrow proposal recommended the expansion of public bus routes, and the introduction of bus rapid transit (BRT), tram and light rail transit (LRT) systems to achieve a 40:60 ratio of private vehicles to public transport.

Halcrow's findings laid the foundation for the PTMP, which was unveiled by then Chief Minister Lim Guan Eng in 2015. The initial cost of the master plan was projected to be RM27 billion. Lim also announced the appointment of SRS Consortium, comprising Gamuda, Penang-based Loh Phoy Yen Holdings and Ideal Property Development, as the Project Delivery Partner (PDP) for the PTMP. The consortium secured the contract in a request for proposal exercise, overcoming five other contenders – namely IJM Corporation, Prasarana Malaysia, Singapore-based CGC Group and two Hong Kong-based investors.

Securing funding for the PTMP proved contentious. As an opposition state, Penang lacked federal support for public transportation, which falls under the ambit of the federal government. Prime Minister Najib Razak had disregarded the state government's requests for financial assistance. Land reclamation rights for the PDP was subsequently suggested to finance the PTMP. Initially, an area of 1,500 acres (610 ha) around Gazumbo Island in the Penang Strait was proposed for land reclamation. However, the state government later retracted this proposal because of ecological concerns and chose instead to focus on land reclamation along the southern coast of Penang Island. The state government estimated that the sale of the reclaimed land could yield RM70 billion in revenue to help cover the costs of PTMP. Furthermore, the development of the newly-reclaimed land was anticipated to create an economic spillover of RM100 billion. The Penang South Reclamation (PSR) scheme, which has since transformed into the Silicon Island project, was introduced in late 2015.

== Description ==
The PTMP is a multimodal master plan consisting of various public transportation and highway components.

=== Mutiara LRT ===
A 17.5 km (10.9 mi) light rail line between Komtar and the Penang International Airport was first proposed in 2015 as the backbone of a future metro network in Penang. The line was subsequently extended to 30 km (19 mi), spanning the proposed islets under the PSR scheme. It received conditional approval from federal regulators in 2019, amid overwhelming public support for the project. However, political feuding between the federal and state governments in the aftermath of the Sheraton Move in 2020 further delayed the project's implementation. It was not until 2023 that federal funding was secured, under newly-elected Prime Minister Anwar Ibrahim. The project was renamed the Mutiara Line and in 2024, federal authorities assumed control and redesigned it to add a cross-strait extension to Seberang Perai. Construction of the 29.5 km (18.3 mi) Mutiara line commenced in 2025 and is expected to be completed by 2031.

=== Tanjong Tokong line ===
A 7 km (4.3 mi) monorail line has been proposed to connect Komtar with the northern suburbs of George Town, namely Tanjong Tokong and Tanjong Pinang. The line will consist of eight stations. Following the federal takeover of the Mutiara LRT, the Tanjong Tokong line will be incorporated as a future extension of the Mutiara line.

=== Ayer Itam monorail ===
A 13 km (8.1 mi) monorail line has been proposed to link Komtar with the western suburbs of George Town, namely Ayer Itam and Paya Terubong. The line will consist of 13 stations. Similar to the Tanjong Tokong line, the Ayer Itam line will also be included as a future extension of the Mutiara LRT.

=== Revival of George Town's tram service ===
Trams had been introduced within downtown George Town in the 1880s, when Penang was part of the British crown colony of the Straits Settlements. They became obsolete by 1936. The PTMP includes a proposal to revive George Town's tram service, specifically within the city's UNESCO World Heritage Site. The proposed tram line would comprise six stops between Komtar and Swettenham Pier, one of the major points of entry into the city.

=== Highway construction ===
In parallel with the conceptualisation of the PTMP in 2011, the Penang state government entered into a memorandum of understanding with the Beijing Urban Construction Group (BUCG) to build three highways – the Pan Island Link 1 (PIL1), Pan Island Link 2 (PIL2) and Pan Island Link 2a (PIL2a) – and a cross-strait tunnel as the third link between George Town and Seberang Perai. The tunnel is intended to complement the existing Penang Bridge and the Second Penang Bridge. While these projects were proposed separately from the PTMP, Halcrow's 2012 report included them, although it advised that the tunnel should only be considered for development by 2030.

BUCG formed a partnership with local firm Zenith Construction, creating Consortium Zenith Construction (CZC) in 2012. The consortium was appointed as the developer for the three highways and the undersea tunnel in the following year. In exchange for these projects, CZC received exclusive development rights for 44.5 ha (110 acres) of land at Gurney Bay, which eliminated the need for toll charges to finance construction.

Apart from the three highways and the tunnel, the PTMP encompasses several smaller road projects, including the North Coastal Paired Road, George Town Inner Ring Road and the Ayer Itam–Tun Dr Lim Chong Eu Expressway Bypass. The three roadways received approval from federal environmental regulators in 2017. Construction of the Ayer Itam–Tun Dr Lim Chong Eu Expressway Bypass began in 2021 and is expected to be completed by 2025.

=== Other components ===
The PTMP includes several other public transportation components.

- A cross-strait cable car line between downtown George Town and Penang Sentral in Seberang Perai. In 2019, the alignment of the proposed line, known as the "Sky Cab", was reportedly being revised. A planned LRT interchange has since been removed from planning.
- A proposed 28 km (17 mi) monorail line in Seberang Perai, between Butterworth and Bukit Mertajam, comprising 21 stations.
- A proposed 14 km (8.7 mi) BRT route in Seberang Perai, between Bukit Tambun and Batu Kawan, comprising 15 stations.

== Criticisms ==
Since its inception, the PTMP has faced opposition from special interest groups. Critics argued that the original Halcrow proposal prioritised public transport infrastructure over highway development and concerns have been raised regarding the environmental impact of the Silicon Island reclamation project. Opponents have also suggested that a BRT system would be more cost-effective than the proposed Mutiara LRT. Despite the LRT line receiving almost 98% public support, dissent against both the PTMP and the land reclamation persisted, with the interest groups aligning themselves with right-wing opposition Malaysian Islamic Party (PAS) to pressure the state government to abandon the projects.

Chief Minister Chow Kon Yeow has asserted that due process was followed in obtaining approvals from the Malaysian federal government for the Mutiara LRT, including engagements with local stakeholders, and suggested the detractors to "look at the bigger picture". Proponents of the PTMP and transport experts countered that bus systems such as the BRT and the autonomous rapid transit (ART) were inadequate for Penang's congested streets, and that rail-based systems would function as a more efficient people mover, unimpeded by traffic conditions. Among others, the elected assemblyman for Pulau Tikus Joshua Woo Sze Zeng questioned the motives of the special interest groups and PAS in opposing the PTMP, and noted that the opponents were unable to propose viable alternative financing for public transportation schemes in the state.

== See also ==
- Rapid Penang
