= List of bus routes in Penang =

Public bus networks in Penang, Malaysia

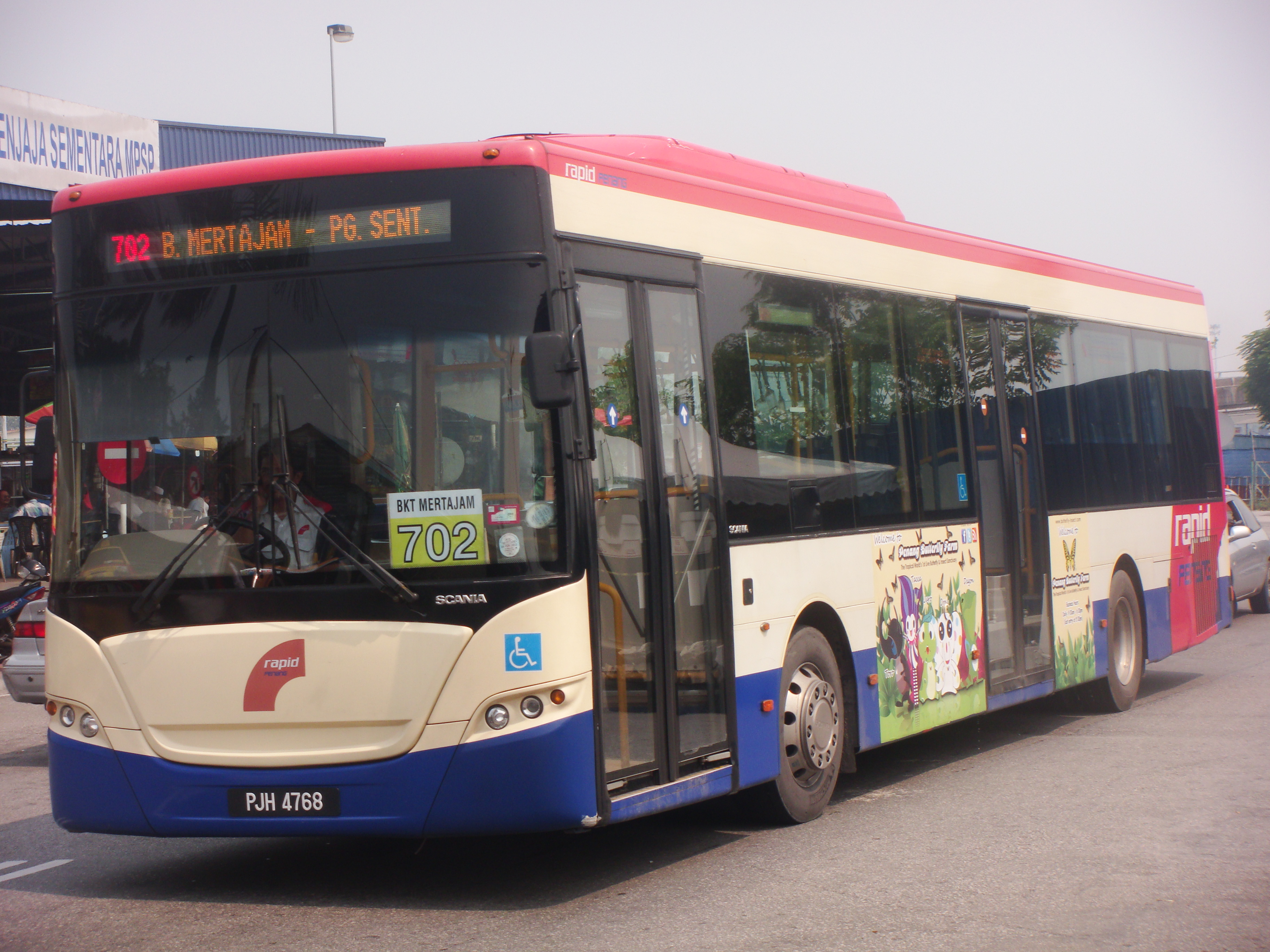
A Rapid Penang Scania K270UB bus (Route 702) equipped with wheelchair-accessible facilities in Bukit Mertajam.

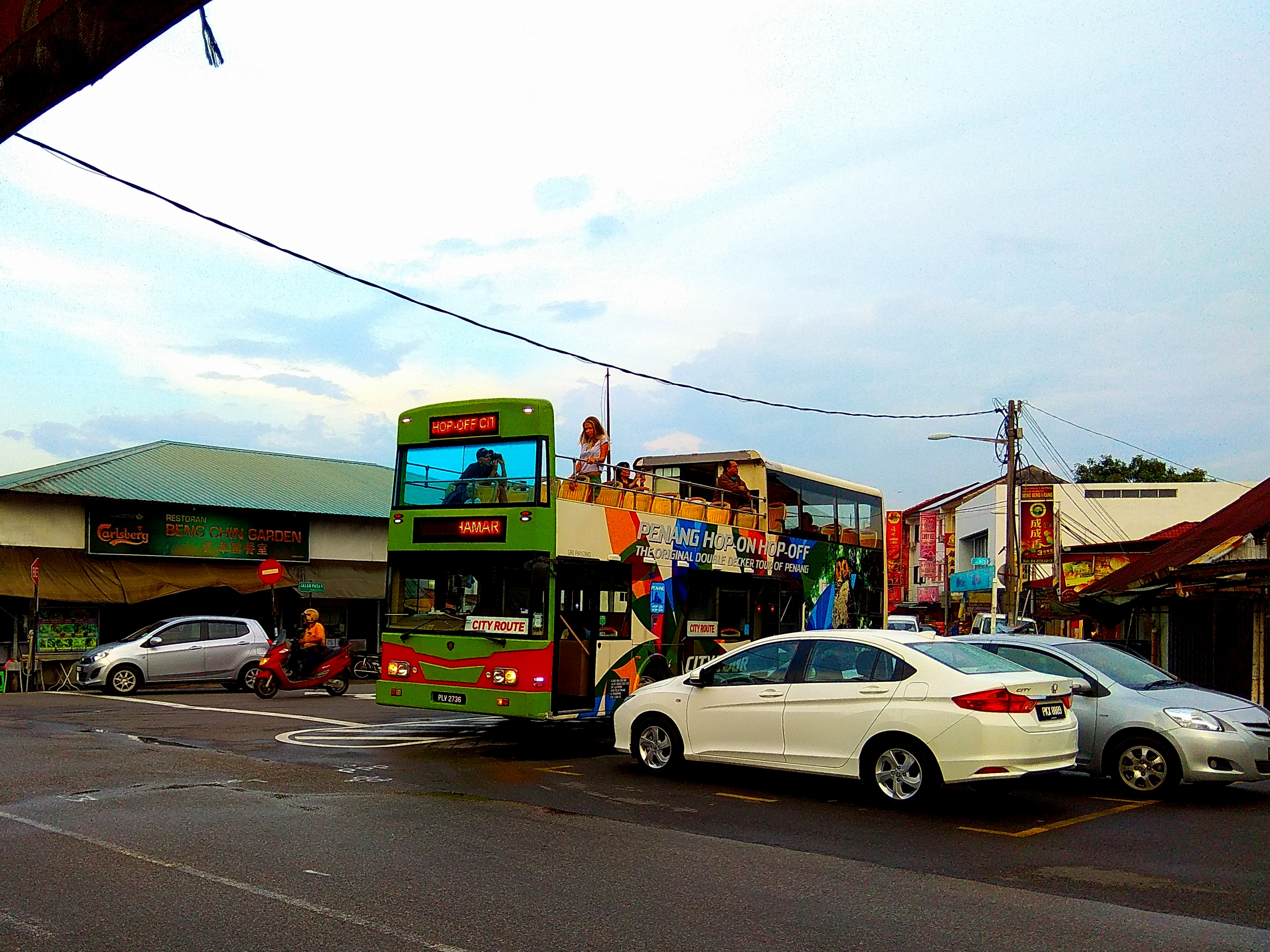
A double-decker Penang Hop-On Hop-Off sightseeing bus at Ayer Itam.

This is a list of bus routes in Penang, Malaysia. The primary operator of public bus services in the state is Rapid Penang, a subsidiary of the federal government-owned Prasarana Malaysia.

In addition to standard stage buses, the state features the Penang Hop-On Hop-Off service, a double-decker open-top sightseeing bus designed primarily for tourists in George Town and the coastal areas. As of 2025, Rapid Penang operated approximately 46 active routes covering the George Town Conurbation, including cross-strait and interstate routes into Kedah and Perak.

== History ==
Public bus services have operated on Penang Island since the 1950s. Historically, services were provided by five main entities: the Penang Island City Council (MPPP) Bus, and private companies such as Lim Seng Seng (known as the "Green Bus"), Hin Company (the "Blue Bus"), Yellow Bus and Sri Negara.

The MPPP Bus operated 14 routes, mostly serving non-profitable areas as a public service. Private operators divided the island's territory:

- Lim Seng Seng (Green Bus): Served Ayer Itam and Paya Terubong.
- Hin Company (Blue Bus): Served the northern coast, including Teluk Bahang and Tanjung Tokong.
- Yellow Bus: Served the southwest, including Batu Maung, Bayan Lepas, and Penang International Airport.
- Sri Negara: Operated short-haul routes within George Town, focusing on Anson Road and the General Hospital area.

By the early 1990s, rising car ownership and the opening of the Penang Bridge led to a decline in bus ridership. In 1993, the federal government instructed the City Council to divest its bus operations, which were taken over by Transit Link. A period of fierce competition ensued, particularly after the introduction of mini-buses in 1996, many of which were second-hand units from Kuala Lumpur.

In 2007, the federal government intervened to restructure the failing network, establishing Rapid Penang. This led to the eventual cessation of most private stage bus operators. Rapid Penang later expanded its services into Sungai Petani (Kedah) and Parit Buntar (Perak) in 2015.

To improve connectivity, the Penang State Government launched the Congestion Alleviation Transport (CAT) free bus scheme in 2008 within the George Town World Heritage Site. This was expanded in 2018 to other areas, though many suburban CAT routes were discontinued in 2021 due to funding and ridership issues, leaving only the George Town route and the Cross-Strait "CAT Bridge" services active.

== Fare system ==
Rapid Penang fares are distance-based. Concession fares (50% discount) are available for senior citizens, students, and persons with disabilities (OKU), provided they are Malaysian citizens.

In September 2019, Rapid Penang introduced the Pas Mutiara (Pearl Pass). For a monthly fee of RM50, commuters enjoy unlimited travel on all Rapid Penang bus services and the Penang Ferry Service.

Distance (km)	Fare (RM)
First 7 km	1.40
7 – 14 km	2.00
14 – 21 km	2.70
21 – 28 km	3.40
> 28 km	4.00

== Active routes ==
The following tables list the active bus routes operated by Rapid Penang as of 2025.

=== Penang Island ===
The hub for Penang Island is Weld Quay (Pengkalan Weld), connecting the ferry terminal with the island's extensive bus network.

Route	Origin	Destination	Service Type	First Trip	Last Trip	Frequency	Notes
CAT	Weld Quay	Komtar	Free Shuttle	06:00	23:45	10 – 15 mins	Free service within George Town Heritage Zone.
11	Weld Quay	Batu Lanchang	Trunk	05:40	21:35	30 – 40 mins	Via Jelutong and Perak Road.
12	Weld Quay	Bandar Sri Pinang	Trunk	06:00	19:30	40 – 50 mins	Via Macallum Street Ghaut.
13	Paya Terubong	Lotus's Penang (E-Gate)	Trunk	06:20	21:40	35 – 70 mins	Via Farlim and Batu Lanchang.
101	Weld Quay	Teluk Bahang	Trunk	05:30	23:30	10 – 12 mins	Coastal route via Batu Ferringhi and Tanjung Bungah.
102	Weld Quay	Penang International Airport	Trunk	06:00	23:35	75 mins	Express route connecting the airport to the northern beaches.
103	Komtar	Pulau Tikus	Trunk	05:40	21:30	15 – 20 mins	Loop service via Northam Road.
104	Komtar	Tanjung Bungah	Trunk	06:30	21:10	80 mins	Via Mount Erskine and Fettes Park.
201	Weld Quay	Paya Terubong (via Ayer Itam)	Trunk	05:30	18:20	10 – 15 mins	
202	Weld Quay	Paya Terubong (via Farlim)	Trunk	05:50	23:30	10 – 12 mins	
203	Weld Quay	Pekan Ayer Itam	Trunk	06:20	21:10	90 mins	Via Farlim.
204	Weld Quay	Penang Hill	Trunk	05:30	23:30	35 – 45 mins	Connects to the Penang Hill Funicular lower station.
206	Weld Quay	Lotus's Penang (E-Gate)	Trunk	06:00	22:30	100 mins	Via Green Lane.
301	Weld Quay	Relau	Trunk	05:45	23:30	15 mins	
302	Weld Quay	Batu Maung	Trunk	05:30	23:30	20 – 30 mins	Via Jalan Bukit Gambir.
303	Weld Quay	Bukit Gedung	Trunk	06:00	22:35	40 – 45 mins	
304	Gurney Drive	Bukit Gedung	Trunk	05:30	22:35	45 – 60 mins	
306	Penang International Airport	Penang General Hospital	Trunk	05:30	22:35	40 mins	Via Scotland Road and Western Road.
308	Sungai Nibong	Gertak Sanggul	Trunk	06:00	22:30	80 mins	Via Teluk Kumbar.
T310	Universiti Sains Malaysia	Queensbay Mall	Trunk	06:00	22:30	20 – 30 mins	
401	Weld Quay	Teluk Kumbar	Trunk	05:55	22:30	60 mins	
401E	Weld Quay	Balik Pulau	Trunk	05:45	23:30	20 mins	Express service via Tun Dr Lim Chong Eu Expressway.
502	Weld Quay	Pekan Genting, Balik Pulau	Trunk	05:30	23:30	30 – 40 mins	Via Paya Terubong mountain road.
403	Balik Pulau	Pulau Betong	Trunk	06:00	19:00	90 – 120 mins	Loop service.
404	Balik Pulau	Pantai Acheh	Trunk	06:00	19:15	105 – 120 mins	

=== Seberang Perai (Mainland) ===
The main hub for the mainland is Penang Sentral in Butterworth, which integrates bus, ferry, and train services.

Route	Origin	Destination	Service Type	First Trip	Last Trip	Frequency	Notes
601	Penang Sentral	Kepala Batas	Trunk	06:00	22:30	30 – 40 mins	
603	Penang Sentral	Kuala Muda	Trunk	07:10	22:30	80 – 90 mins	
604	Penang Sentral	Taman Desa Murni	Trunk	07:10	18:20	140 – 180 mins	Via Sungai Dua.
605	Penang Sentral	Teluk Air Tawar	Trunk	06:15	20:00	60 – 70 mins	Via Mak Mandin.
613	Penang Sentral	Padang Serai	Trunk	06:20	22:30	70 – 80 mins	Interstate route to Kedah.
701	Penang Sentral	Bukit Mertajam	Trunk	06:15	22:30	15 – 25 mins	
606	Bukit Mertajam	Kepala Batas	Trunk	08:00	17:15	180 mins	
610	Kepala Batas	Tasek Gelugor	Trunk	06:00	-	-	Single trip only. Loop service.
702	Penang Sentral	Bukit Mertajam	Trunk	06:00	22:30	45 mins	Via Jalan Permatang Pauh.
703	Penang Sentral	Seberang Jaya	Trunk	06:00	22:30	25 – 50 mins	Serves Bandar Sunway.
706	Penang Sentral	Taman Pelangi	Trunk	07:30	17:25	150 mins	Via Juru.
707	Bukit Mertajam	Taman Pelangi	Trunk	07:30	20:00	180 mins	
708	Bukit Mertajam	Junjung	Trunk	07:30	18:15	155 – 160 mins	
709	Penang Sentral	Machang Bubok	Trunk	06:00	19:50	110 – 130 mins	
801	Penang Sentral	Nibong Tebal	Trunk	05:40	22:30	40 – 50 mins	Via Perai.
EB60	Penang Sentral	Sungai Petani	Intercity	06:30	22:30	30 – 45 mins	Connects to Kedah.
EB80	Penang Sentral	Parit Buntar	Intercity	07:10	22:30	60 mins	Connects to Perak.
802	Bukit Mertajam	Nibong Tebal	Trunk	06:00	22:00	60 mins	Via Simpang Ampat.
803	Nibong Tebal	Sungai Acheh	Trunk	06:00	14:00	-	Two trips only. Loop service.

=== Cross-Strait "CAT Bridge" ===
These routes utilize the Penang Bridge to connect the Island and the Mainland.

Route	Origin	Destination	Service Type	First Trip	Last Trip	Frequency	Notes
CAT13	Seberang Jaya	Bayan Baru	Free Shuttle	06:00	20:20	60 – 65 mins	Operates during morning and evening peak hours only. Serves the Bayan Lepas Free Industrial Zone.
CAT14	Bukit Mertajam	Komtar	Free Shuttle	06:00	19:00	30 mins	Operates during morning and evening peak hours only.

== Other operators ==
While Rapid Penang is the primary public transport provider, several private operators continue to run specific stage bus routes with financial support from the Ministry of Transport's Interim Stage Bus Support Fund (ISBSF). These services primarily function as interstate connectors, linking key hubs in Seberang Perai (such as Penang Sentral and Bukit Mertajam) with towns in southern Kedah (such as Kulim and Sungai Petani).

Operator	Route	Origin	Destination	First Trip	Last Trip	Frequency	Notes
Lean Hock Bus	20	Bukit Mertajam	Padang Serai	06:50	18:50	160 mins	Via Penanti and Lunas. Interstate route to Kedah.
Lean Hock Bus	51	Bukit Mertajam	Lunas	05:55	18:10	85 – 90 mins	Interstate route to Kedah.
Lean Hock Bus	107	Bukit Mertajam	Kulim	06:25	19:25	60 mins	Via Machang Bubok. Interstate route connecting to Kulim Bus Station.
Lean Hock Bus	15/16/17	Bukit Mertajam	Taman Perwira	05:55	19:40	75 mins	Local commercial route via Alma and Permatang Tinggi.
Lean Hock Bus	62	Penang Sentral	Kulim	06:20	19:20	90 mins	Express service via Butterworth–Kulim Expressway (BKE).
Gopi Travel & Tours	17	Penang Sentral	Sungai Petani (Jalan Petri Terminal)	06:10	19:40	30 – 60 mins	Via Butterworth and Kepala Batas. Interstate route (alternative to Rapid Penang EB60).

== Rapid on-demand (DRT) ==
Rapid Penang has introduced Demand-Responsive Transit (DRT) van services in selected zones under the "Kummute" brand.

Zone Code	Service Area	Operator
T110B	Gurney Drive, Tanjung Bungah & Tanjung Tokong	Kummute
T111B	George Town	Kummute
T210B	Farlim, Ayer Itam, Paya Terubong	Kummute
T311B	Jelutong	Kummute
T313B	Bayan Baru & Bayan Lepas	Kummute
T410B	Balik Pulau	Kummute
T611B	Bertam	Kummute
T710B	Sunway & Butterworth	Kummute
T711B	Bukit Mertajam (BM City)	Kummute
T810B	Batu Kawan & Sungai Bakap	Kummute
T811B	Nibong Tebal, Parit Buntar, Bandar Baharu	Kummute

== Former routes ==
The following routes were previously operated by Rapid Penang or other local operators but have since been discontinued or merged. This includes the extensive suburban CAT feeder network, which ceased in 2021.

Route	Origin	Destination	Notes
10	Weld Quay	Botanic Gardens	Discontinued.
200	Weld Quay	State Mosque	Replaced by 201/202/203.
305	Sungai Nibong	Teluk Tempoyak	Discontinued.
307	Weld Quay	Bukit Gedung	Discontinued.
501	Balik Pulau	Teluk Bahang	Discontinued. This route famously connected the two ends of the island via the coastal hill road.
AT	Weld Quay	Penang Airport	Airport Transit. Replaced by Route 401E and 102.
BEST A/B/C	Various	Free Industrial Zone	"Bridge Express Shuttle Transit" for factory workers. Replaced by CAT Bridge.
CAT Feeders	Various	Various	Routes CT1 through CT12 (Air Itam, Balik Pulau, Alma, etc.) were free community feeder buses introduced in 2018 and discontinued in 2021.

== See also ==
- Bus transport in Malaysia
- Prasarana Malaysia
- Penang Sentral
