= Machang Bubok =

- Village in Seberang Perai
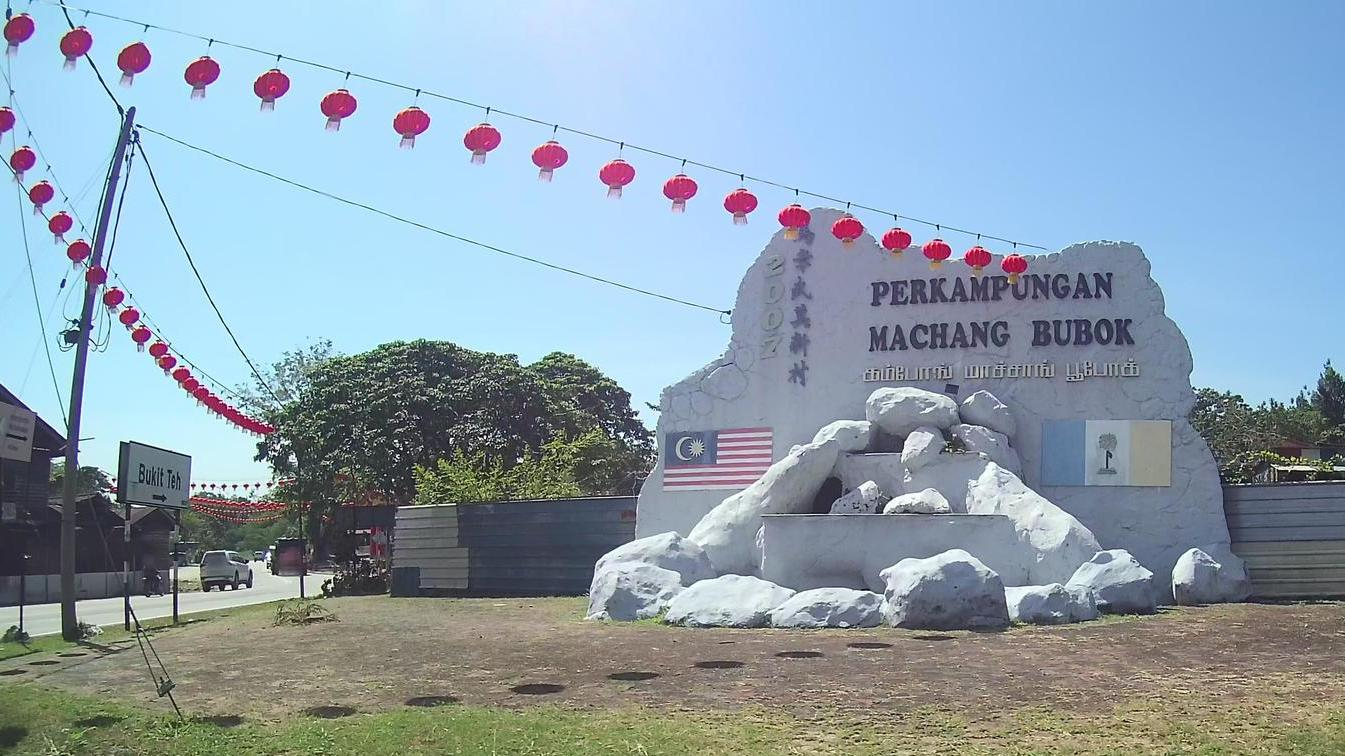

- Location within Seberang Perai in Penang
- Coordinates: 5°20′0″N 100°30′0″E
- Country: Malaysia
- State: Penang
- City: Seberang Perai
- District: Central Seberang Perai
- Time zone: UTC+8 (MST)
  - Summer (DST): Not observed
- Postal code: 140xx

Machang Bubok is a new village within the city of Seberang Perai in the Malaysian state of Penang.

As of date November 2011, the Machang Bubok village has 2134 people and 85% of the population consists of Chinese. About 12% of them are Malays and less than 3% are Indians. The major language spoken in this village is Hakka. This village has about 421 houses. Many city dwellers visit this village during holidays and festive seasons because the air is fresher and the food is delicious and inexpensive.

== See also ==
- Cherok Tok Kun
- Bukit Mertajam
- Kulim
