= Sungai Nibong Bus Terminal =

Bus station in George Town, Penang, Malaysia

Sungai Nibong Bus Terminal Terminal Bas Sungai Nibong
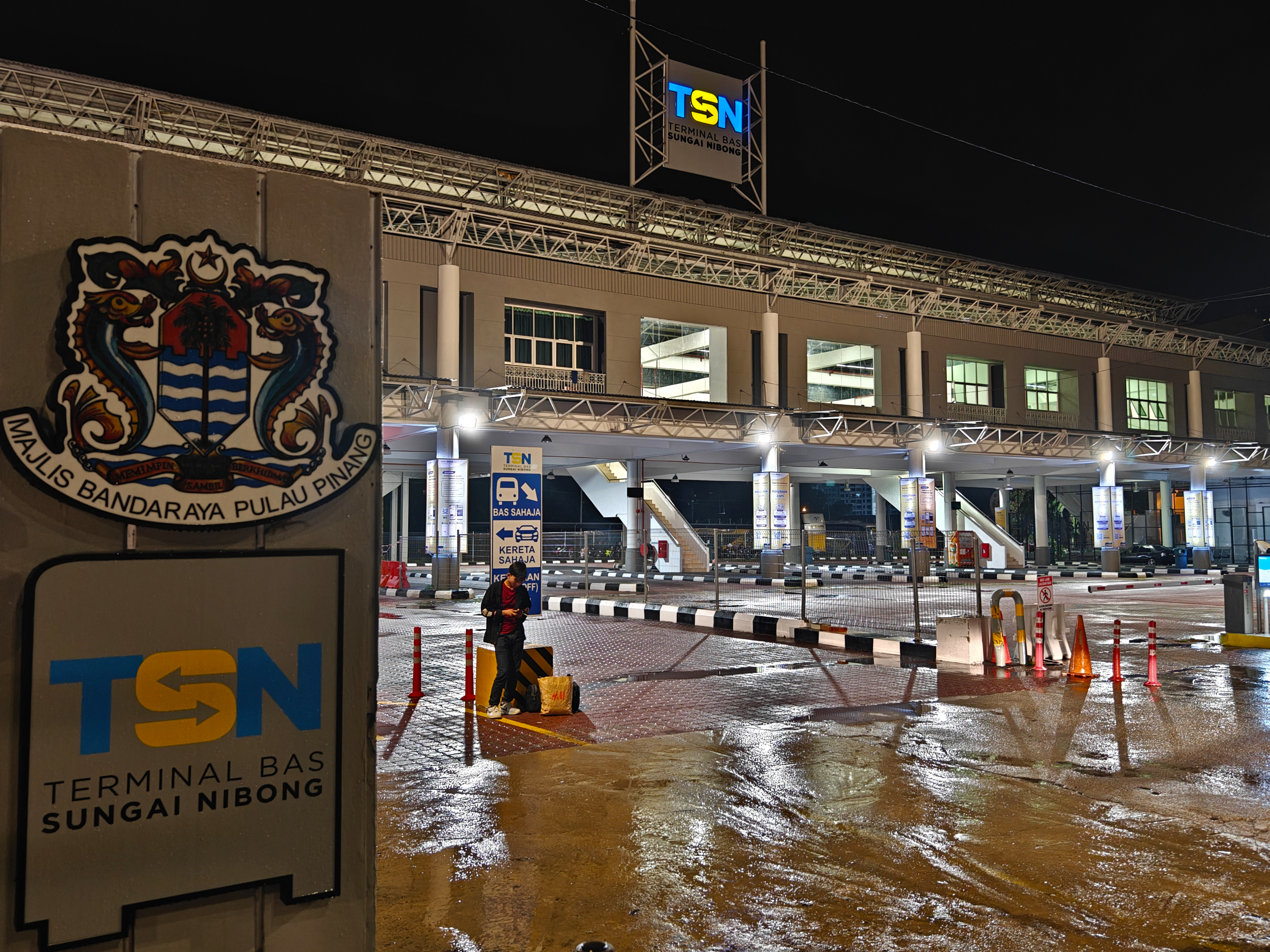

General information
- Location: Jalan Sultan Azlan Shah, George Town; Penang; Malaysia
- Coordinates: 5.343175°N 100.30048°E
- System: Bus station
- Owner: Penang Island City Council
- Operator: UDA Holdings

Construction
- Structure type: At-grade
- Parking: Available with payment
- Accessible: Y

History
- Opened: April 2005

Services
Rapid Penang
Intercity buses
Taxis
Location

The Sungai Nibong Bus Terminal is a bus station in George Town within the Malaysian state of Penang. Built in 2004, the terminal serves as the main intercity bus hub for the city, with services to the rest of Peninsular Malaysia and Singapore, along with Rapid Penang public transit services. Spanning an area of 42,112 sq ft (3,912.3 m^{2}), the terminal, owned by the Penang Island City Council, has a capacity of 1,000. It is also slated to form part of the proposed Mutiara LRT system.

== History ==
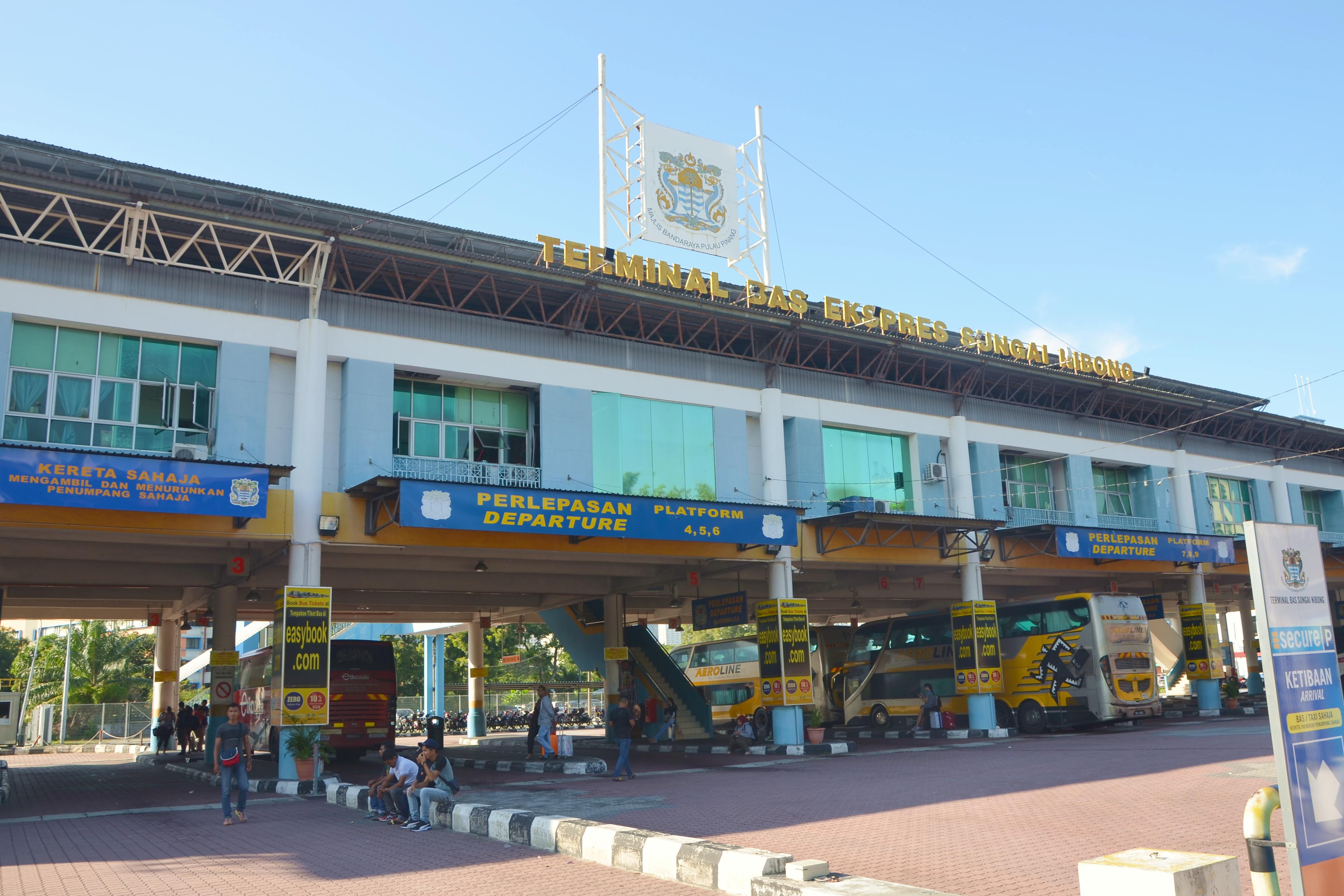
Sungai Nibong Bus Terminal prior to upgrades between 2021 and 2024.

The Sungai Nibong Bus Terminal was constructed in 2004 and officially opened to the public in April 2005, serving as a hub for intercity and transit bus services. In the years after its launch, the terminal faced challenges such as complaints about touts and insufficient amenities.

In 2021, Easybook, an online transport service provider, was granted a contract to revamp the terminal. The refurbishment included the integration of universal design amenities, implementation of automated ticketing systems and other infrastructure improvements. The upgrade project was completed in 2024 with a total cost of RM7 million, an increase from the initial estimate of RM6.2 million. UDA Holdings was appointed to manage the terminal, with plans to introduce retail spaces within the facility.

The terminal is also set to be part of the proposed Mutiara LRT line, which envisions a transit-oriented development around the terminal including a new train station and a maintenance depot at a nearby public space.

== Public transport ==
Rapid Penang operates five bus routes through the terminal, connecting it with various parts of George Town.

- 102: Sungai Nibong bus terminal–Penang National Park–Penang International Airport
- 303: Sungai Nibong bus terminal–Weld Quay–Bukit Gedung
- 304: Sungai Nibong bus terminal–Gurney Drive–Bukit Gedung
- 308: Sungai Nibong bus terminal–Gertak Sanggul
- 401: Sungai Nibong bus terminal–Weld Quay–Teluk Kumbar

== See also ==
- Penang Sentral
