= Penang Sentral =

Transit-oriented development in Seberang Perai, Penang, Malaysia

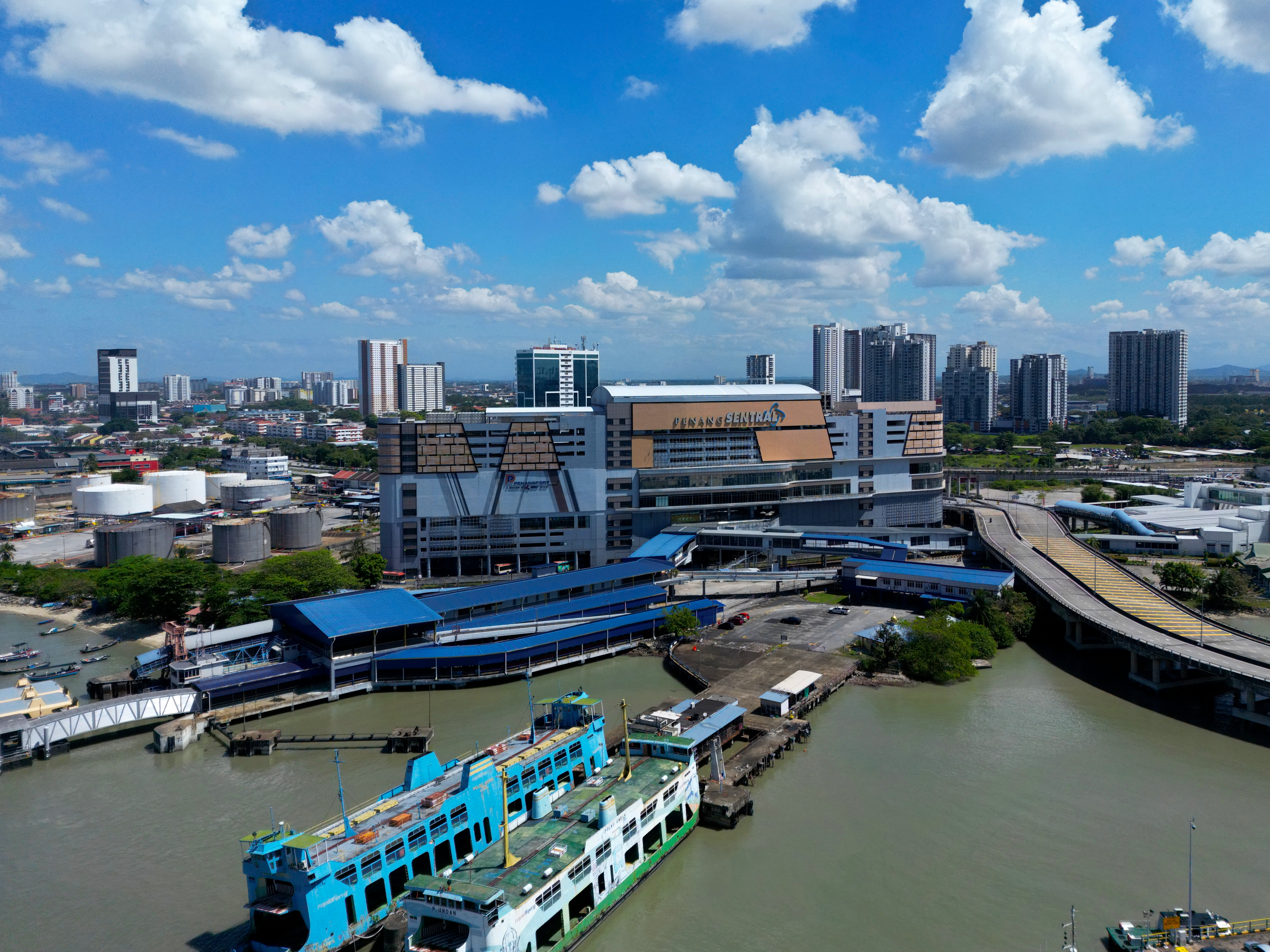

General information
- Location: Bagan Dalam, Butterworth, Penang, Malaysia.
- System: Transit-oriented development hub and Intermodal passenger transport station
- Owner: Main building: MRCB; Butterworth station : KTMB; Ferry Terminal : Penang Port
- Connections: Access to Sultan Abdul Halim Ferry Terminal and Butterworth railway station through footbridge

Construction
- Structure type: Subsurface
- Parking: Available with payment
- Accessible: Y

Other information
- Website: www.penangsentral.com.my

History
- Opened: 22 November 2018; 7 years ago

Services
Rapid Penang
Intercity buses
Taxis
Location

Penang Sentral is an intermodal transit-oriented development in Butterworth, Penang, Malaysia. Proposed as the main transportation hub within the George Town Conurbation, the first phase of the Penang Sentral project opened on 22 November 2018.

Modeled after KL Sentral in Kuala Lumpur, the first phase of Penang Sentral will serve as the terminal for both public and intercity buses, and is physically connected to the adjacent Butterworth railway station and the Penang Ferry terminal. The project will eventually comprise an integrated terminal for all bus, rail and sea transportation services within Penang. Future phases of the project also include commercial, retail and residential developments.

== History ==
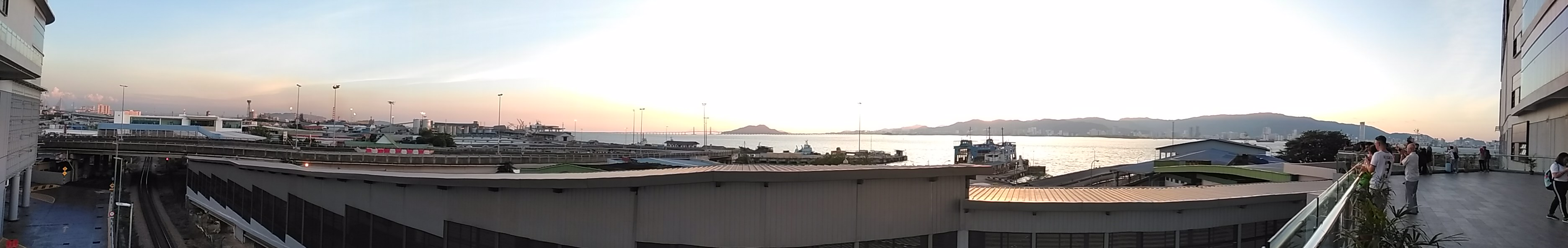
Panoramic view of Penang Sentral open deck

Touted as the gateway to northern Malaysia by its developers, the Penang Sentral project was announced by the then Malaysian Prime Minister, Abdullah Badawi in 2007. The project, covering a 12.8-hectare (32-acre) site in the heart of Butterworth, was to be jointly undertaken by Malaysian Resources Corporation Berhad (MRCB) and Perlaburan Hartanah Bumiputera Berhad.

Veritas Architects was put in charge of the design works of the proposed transit-oriented development, while the construction of Phase 1 was allocated to a subsidiary of MRCB, Penang Sentral Sdn Bhd. Penang Sentral was modeled after KL Sentral, which also incorporated commercial and residential elements. The entire project was divided into eight phases, of which the second, third and fourth phases comprised a shopping complex, three office blocks and a 36-storey hotel respectively.

However, since its launch in 2007, the Penang Sentral project has suffered repeated delays. Land acquisition became the main stumbling block, as the parcels of land earmarked for the development were owned by several parties, namely the Malaysian federal government, the Penang state government, highway concessionaires and Keretapi Tanah Melayu, the national railway operator. As a result, construction of Phase 1 of Penang Sentral only began in earnest in 2015.

== Station layout ==
1 Bus platform		Driveway
	← Rapid Penang Island platform Intercity bus→
	Driveway
2	Concourse Level	Non-integrated Connections to and, Customer Service Counter, Ticket Vending Machine, Convenience Store and Taxi Stand
3	Convenience Store, parking

== Routes ==
Platform	Code	Route	Operator
A 02	703	Penang Sentral - Lotus's Seberang Jaya	Rapid Penang
A 03	601	Penang Sentral - Kepala Batas	Rapid Penang
A 04	613	Penang Sentral - Padang Serai	Rapid Penang
A 04	603	Penang Sentral - Kuala Muda	Rapid Penang
A 05	604	Penang Sentral - Desa Murni	Rapid Penang
A 05	605	Penang Sentral - Pekan Darat	Rapid Penang
A 06	701	Penang Sentral - Bukit Mertajam via Jalan Baru	Rapid Penang
A 07	702	Penang Sentral - Bukit Mertajam via Permatang Pauh	Rapid Penang
A 09	707	Penang Sentral - Taman Pelangi	Rapid Penang
A 09	709	Penang Sentral - Machang Bubok	Rapid Penang
A 10	801	Penang Sentral - Nibong Tebal	Rapid Penang
A 11	EB60	Penang Sentral - Sungai Petani	Rapid Penang
A 12	EB80	Penang Sentral - Parit Buntar	Rapid Penang
	17	Penang Sentral - Sungai Petani	Tanjung Mewah
	62	Penang Sentral - Kulim	Lean Hock Bus

== Gallery ==
Penang Sentral's stage bus platform.

Penang Sentral's Rapid Penang bus platform is located at the Level 1 of the plaza.

Lean Hock Company also providing bus services to Kulim, Kedah

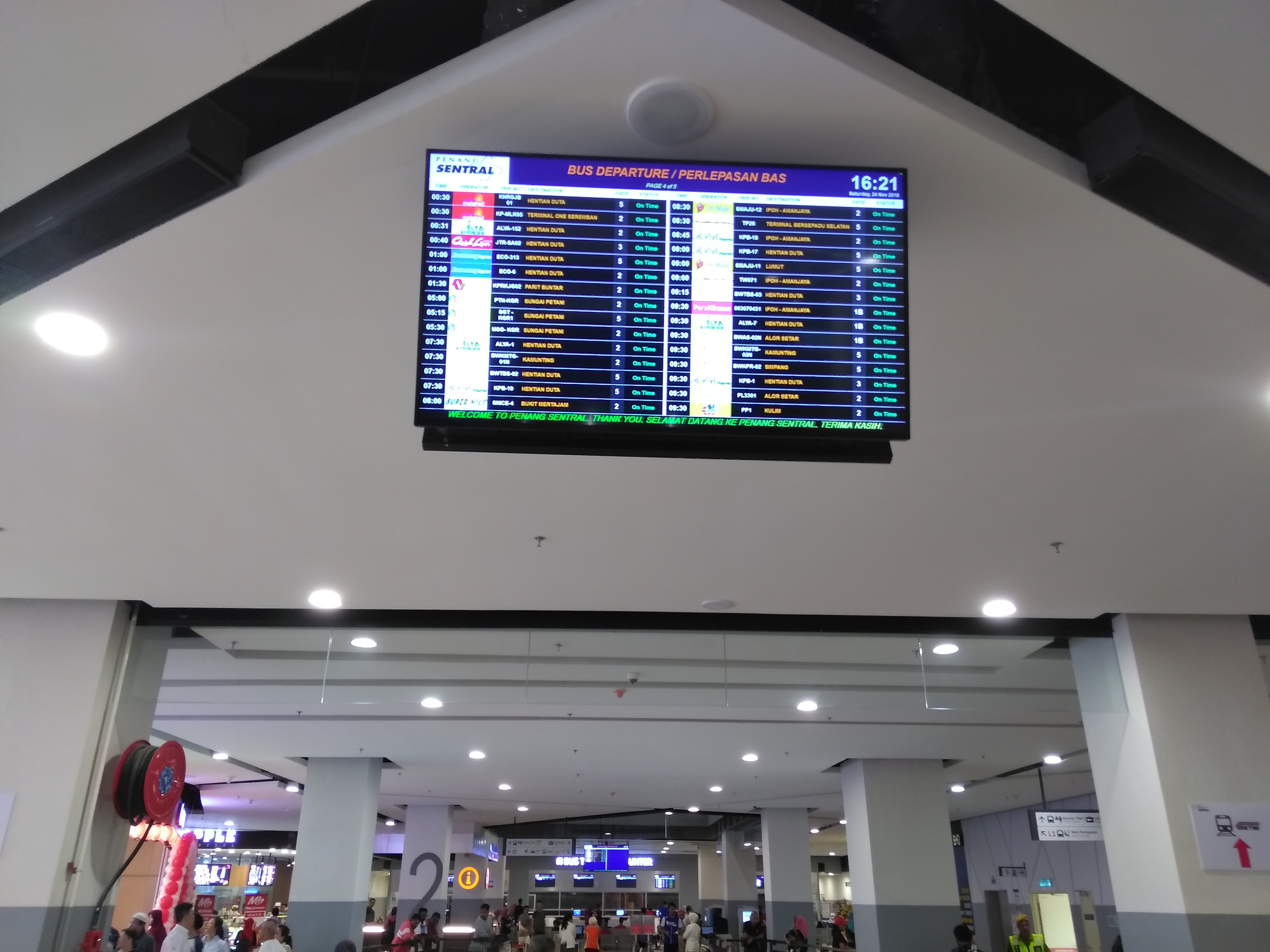
Penang Sentral bus Passenger information display system indicates the departure time of each intercity bus route.

Bus ticketing counter at 2 floor

Temporary footway to Butterworth railway station from Penang Sentral Level 2

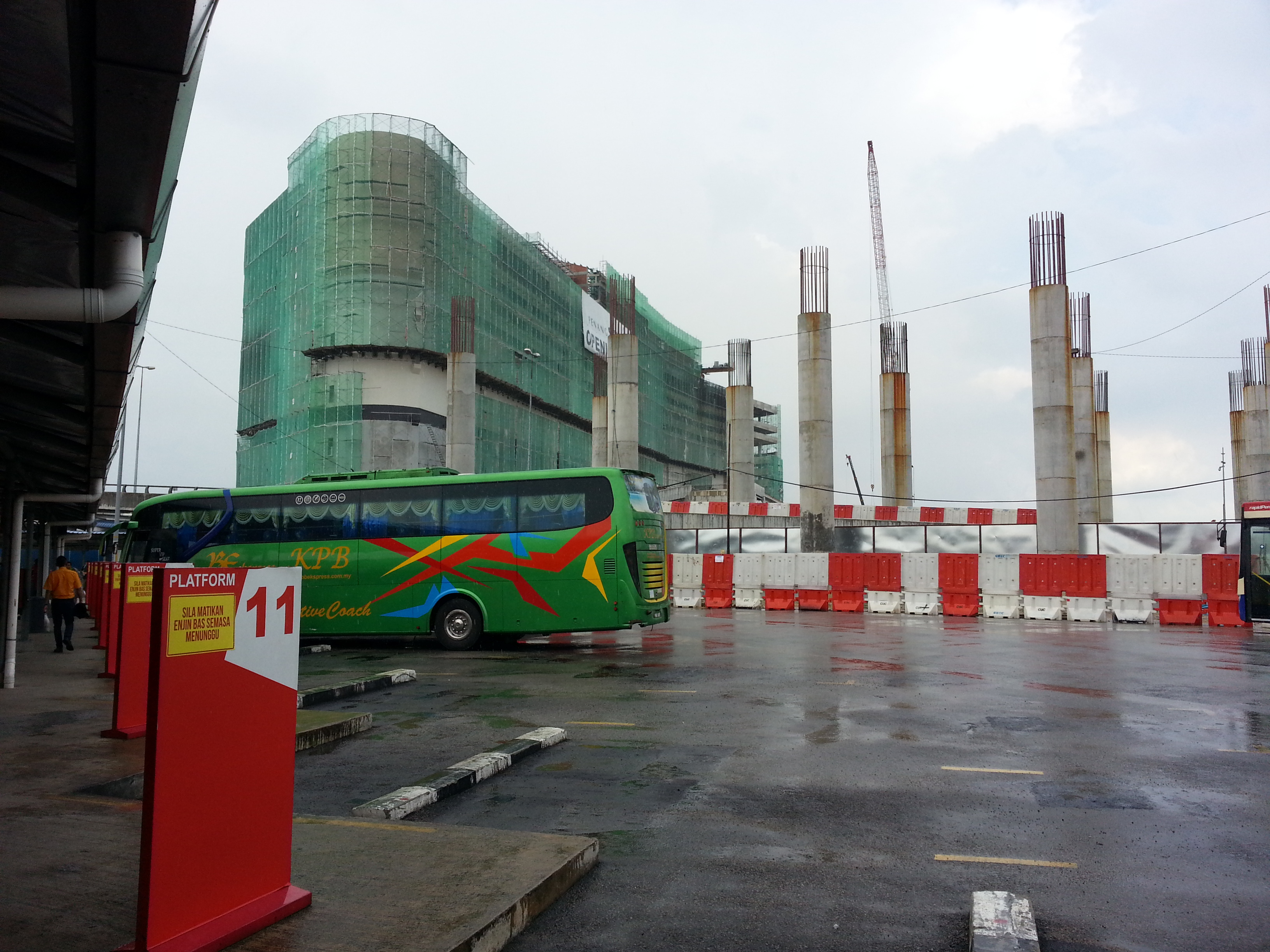
The under construction Penang Sentral

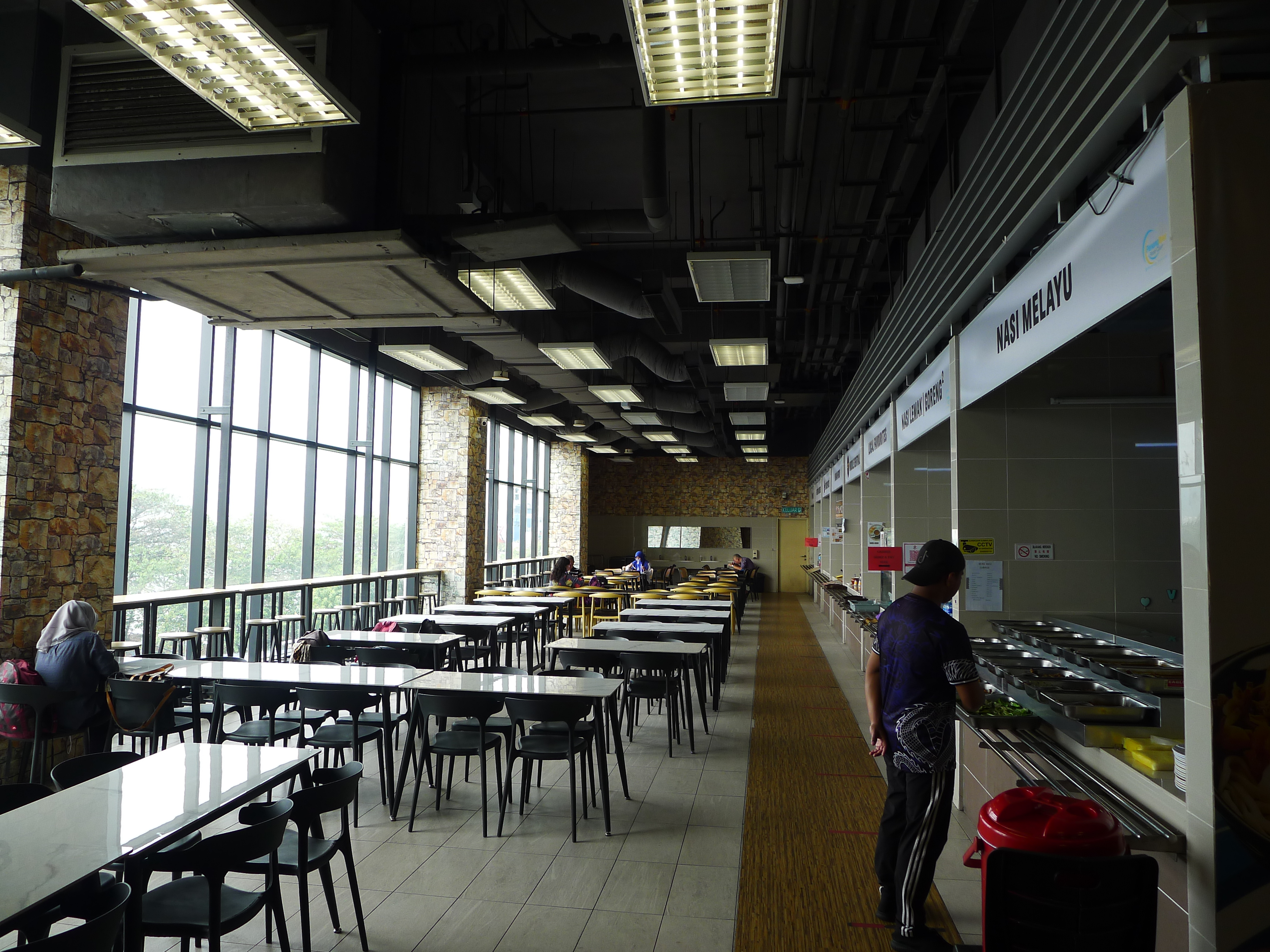
Food court located at the third floor, which is recently reopened in 2024.

UTC Seberang Perai, a centralized one-stop government services hub occupying Levels 3 and 4 of Penang Sentral.

== See also ==
- Sungai Nibong bus terminal
