= Penang Strait =

Strait in Malaysia

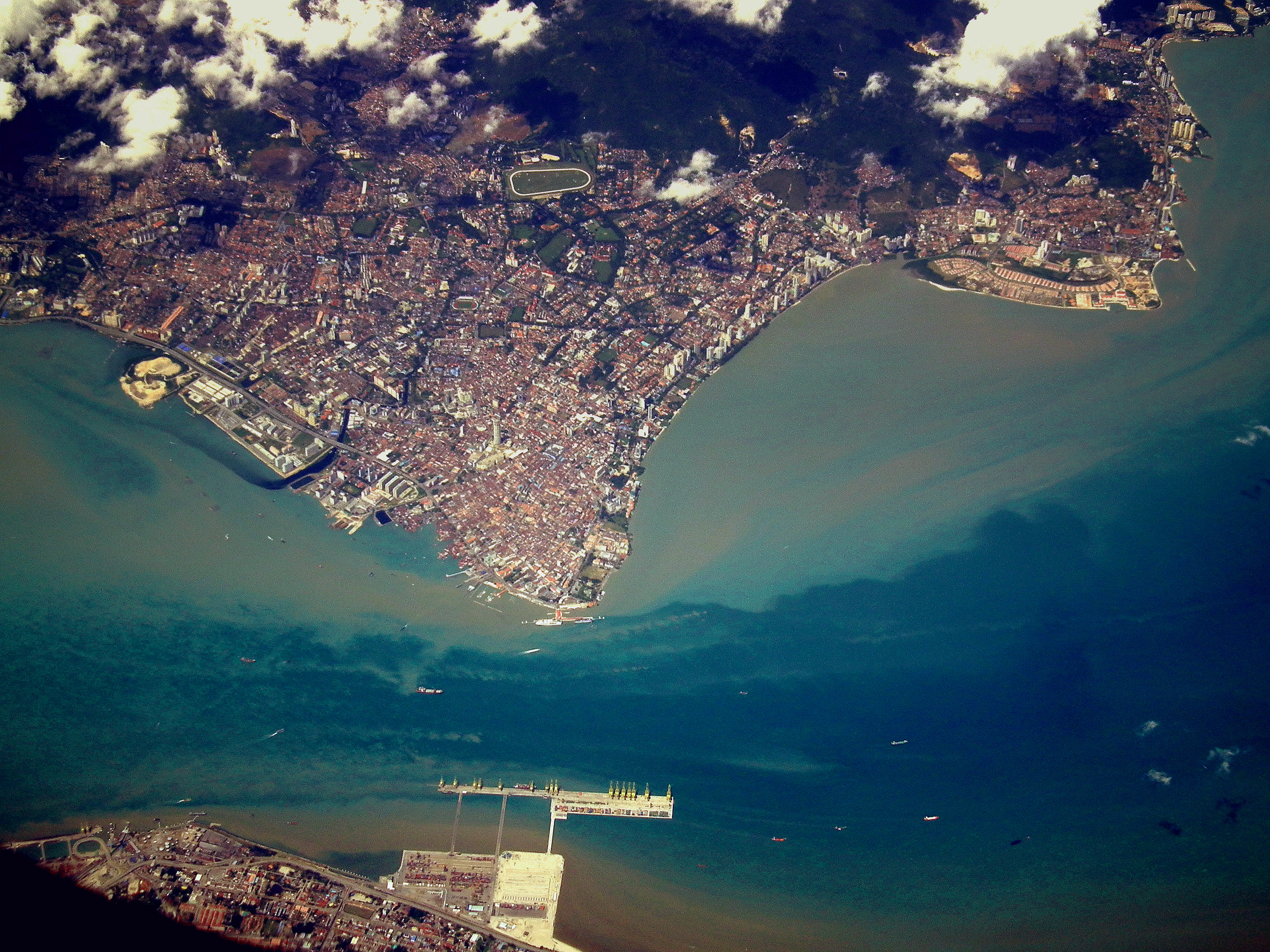
- George Town on Penang Island (top) and Butterworth on the Malay Peninsula (bottom).

- Location within Malaysia
- Location: Penang
- Coordinates: 5.3371°N 100.35°E
- Part of: Strait of Malacca
- Primary inflows: Penang Island: Pinang River; Seberang Perai: Perai River; Muda River
- Basin countries: Malaysia
- Max. width: 3–11.265 km (1.864–7.000 mi)
- Islands: Aman Island, Gedung Island, Jerejak Island
- Settlements: Penang Island: George Town; Bayan Lepas; Batu Maung; Seberang Perai: Butterworth; Perai; Batu Kawan

The Penang Strait is an 11-kilometre-wide (6.8 mi) strait that separates Penang Island from mainland Malay Peninsula. Penang Island is to the west of the channel, while Seberang Perai, the mainland half of the State of Penang, is to the east. The northern and southern ends of the channel join the Strait of Malacca, one of the world's busiest maritime routes.

The strait provides deepwater passage to the Port of Penang, which is located in Butterworth in Seberang Perai. In addition, Swettenham Pier in George Town, Penang's capital city that is situated on Penang Island, is a popular destination for cruise ships, serving as one of the major entry points into Penang.

Since the foundation of Penang as a trading outpost of the British Empire in 1786, the Penang Strait has historically been a busy shipping route.

== Geography ==
The Penang Strait separates Penang Island from the Malay Peninsula to the east. It connects with the Strait of Malacca to the north and south.

The strait can also be further divided into the North Channel and the South Channel. The North Channel refers to the body of water north of the northeastern promontory of Penang Island, where George Town is situated, whereas the South Channel covers the body of water south of that promontory.

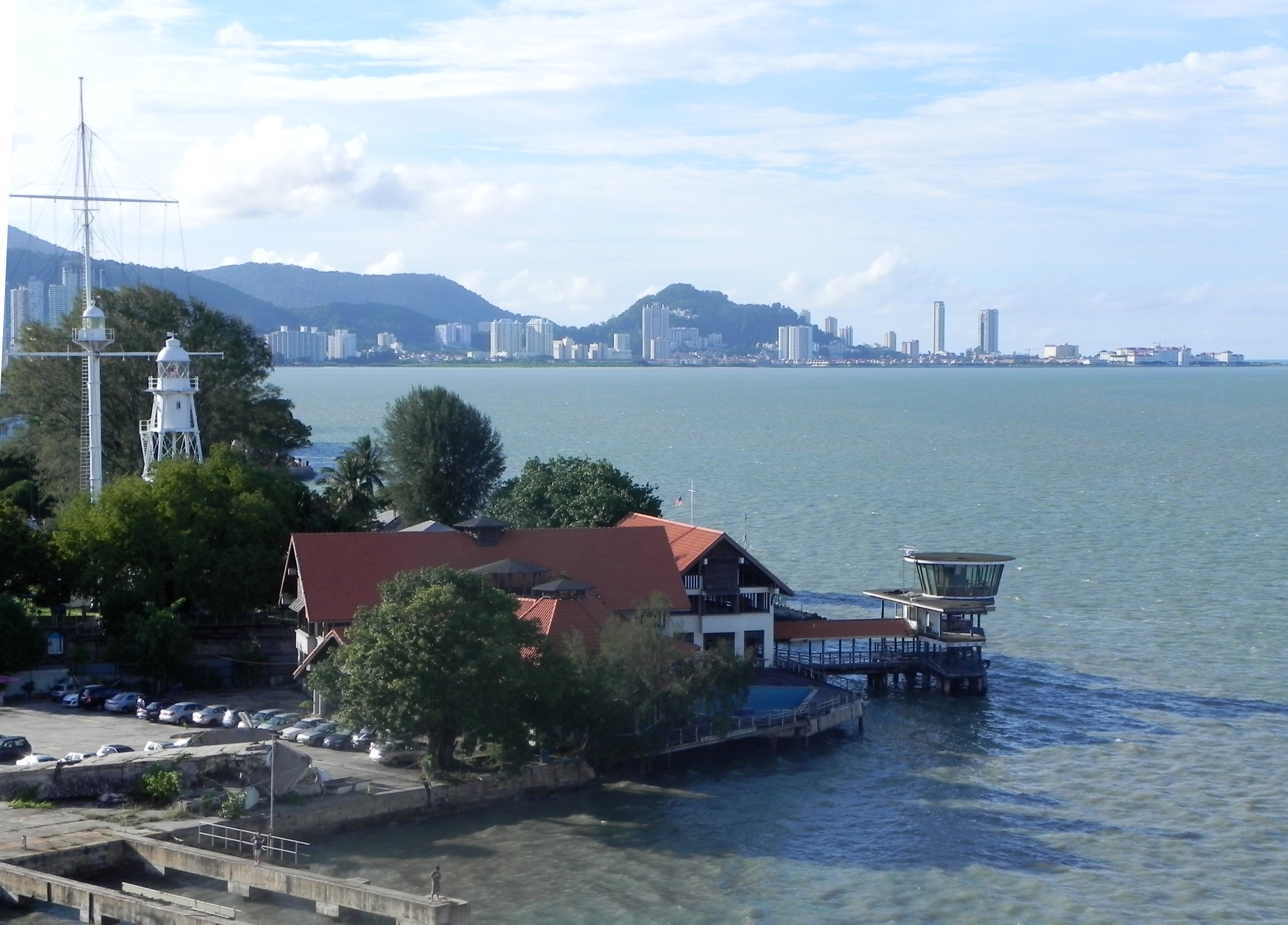
The North Channel off the northern coastline of George Town

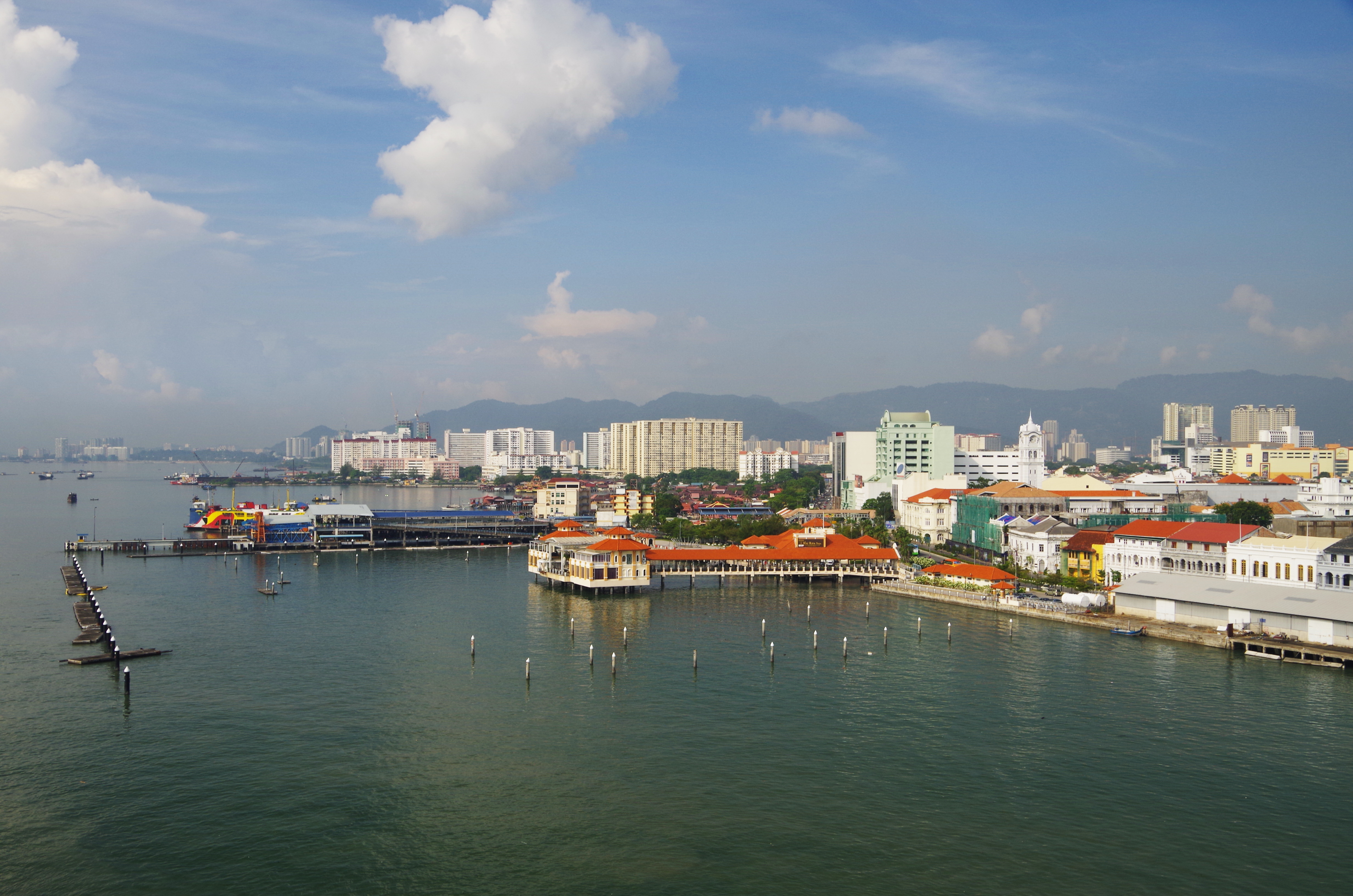
The South Channel along the eastern shoreline of George Town

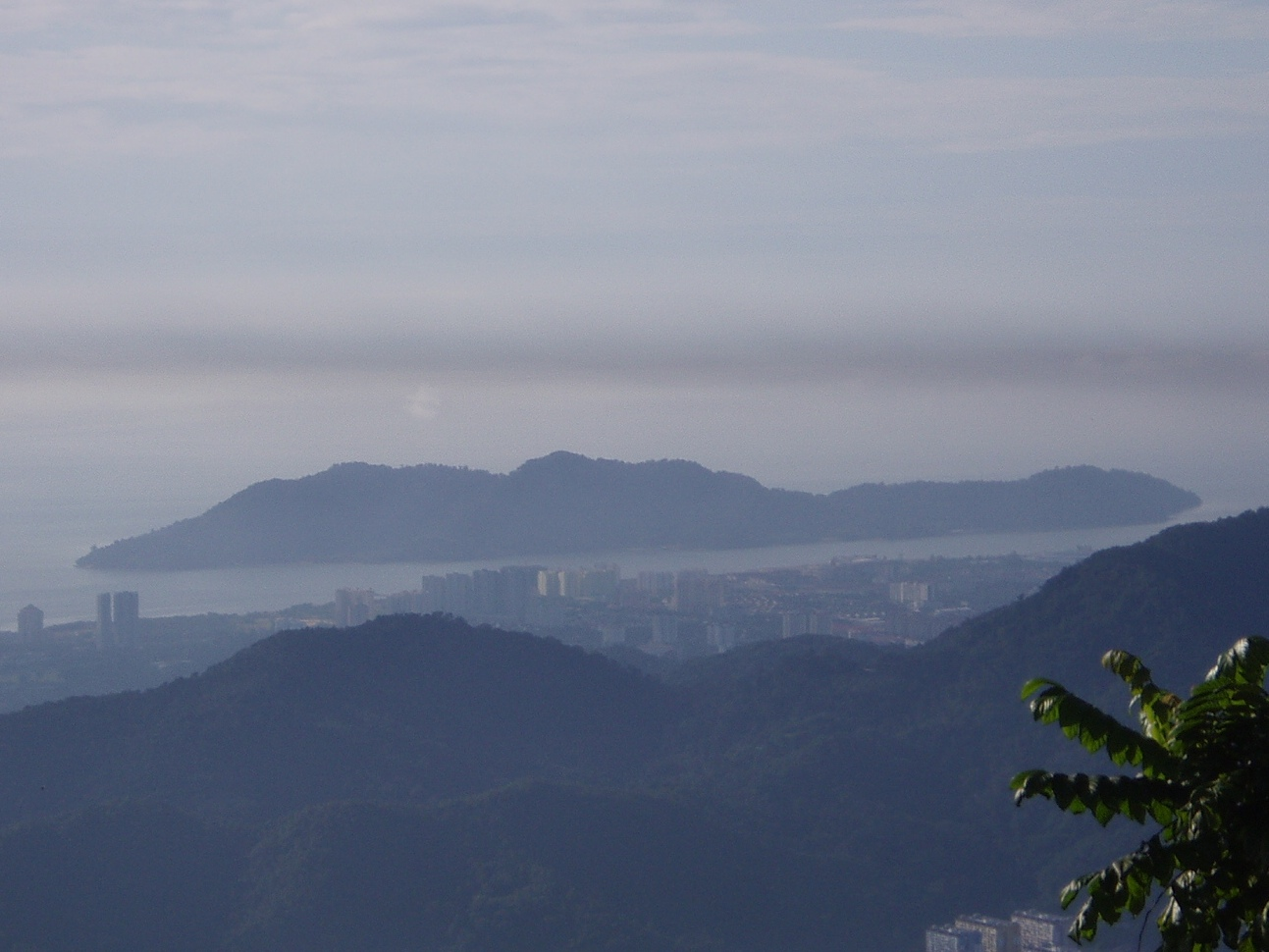
Jerejak Island, the largest island within the Penang Strait

=== Tributaries ===
The rivers that flow into the Penang Strait are listed as follows.

Penang Island:

- Pinang River
- Gelugor River
- Bayan Lepas River

Seberang Perai:

- Perai River
- Muda River
- Kerian River
- Juru River
- Jawi River

=== Islands ===
A handful of islands and islets lie within the South Channel of the Penang Strait. The largest of all is Jerejak Island, located off the southeastern coast of Penang Island. The largely forested island was once the site of a leper asylum, which was then converted into a maximum security prison before its eventual closure in 1993.

Other islets within the strait are Aman Island and Gedung Island, both of which are located off the southern coast of Seberang Perai. Man-made islets were also created during the construction of the Penang Bridge in the 1980s.

== History ==
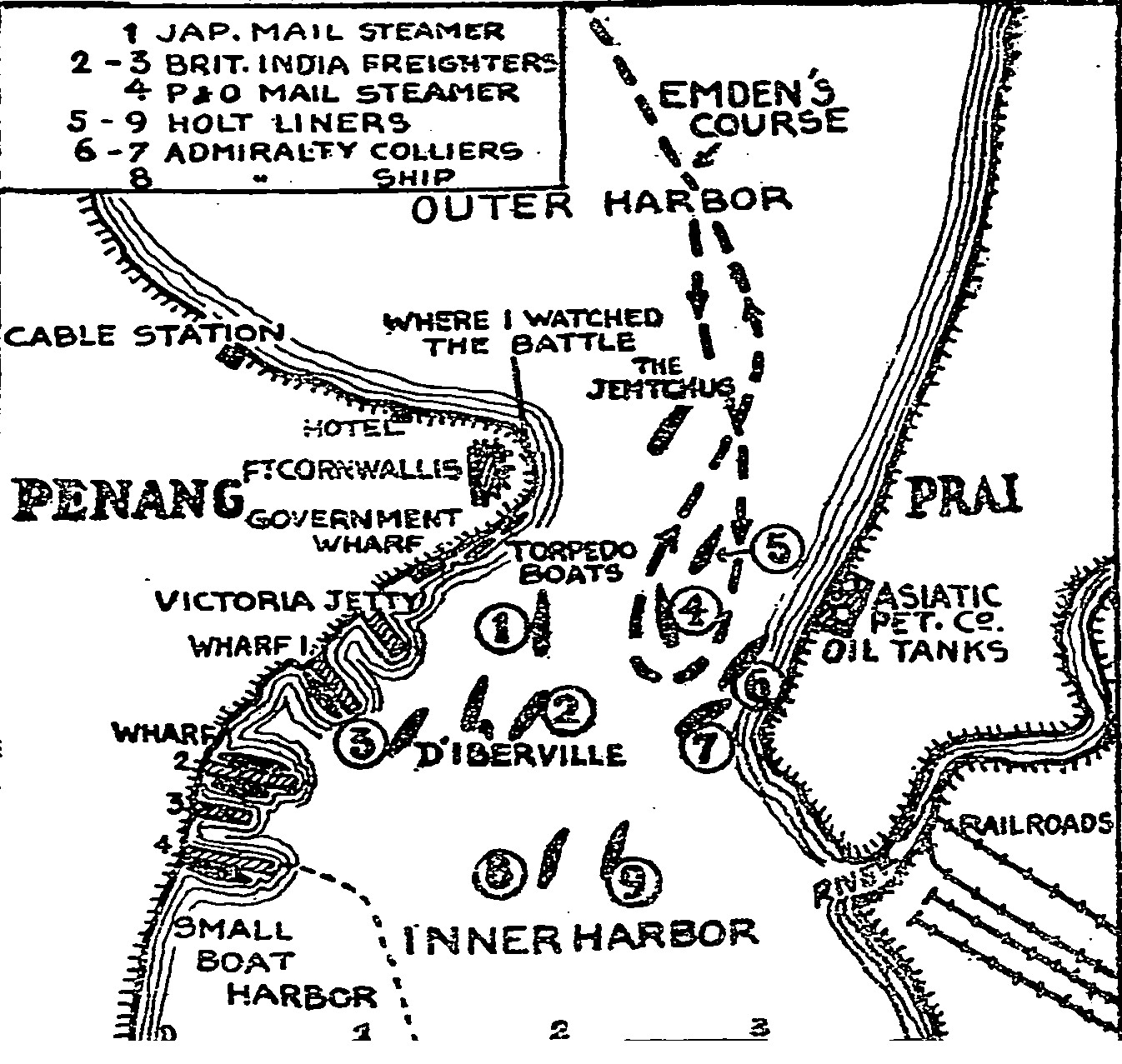
The Battle of Penang occurred in the Penang Strait on 28 October 1914. This map was produced by the New York Times.

Ever since the establishment of George Town in 1786, the Penang Strait has served as an important shipping route within the State of Penang. Up until the 1970s, the main harbour facilities were situated at Weld Quay in George Town. The reclamation of Weld Quay in the late 19th century allowed larger ships to dock off the city's waterfront, as the depth of the seas off Weld Quay was deeper.

In 1974, the Port of Penang's cargo facilities were shifted to Butterworth across the strait. Thus, cargo and container shipping are mainly handled in Butterworth, while Swettenham Pier in George Town continues to receive cruise ships to this day. In 2015 alone, Swettenham Pier recorded 145 port calls, the highest in Malaysia. Meanwhile, Butterworth's port facilities handled more than 1.2 million TEU of cargo in 2013, making it one of the busiest harbours in the country.

The Penang Strait was also the scene where the initial shots of the Battle of Penang were fired on 28 October 1914. The Imperial German Navy cruiser, SMS Emden, sailed into the strait disguised as a British ship before shelling and torpedoing the Imperial Russian Navy cruiser, Zhemchug. SMS Emden then sailed northwest towards the Malacca Straits, sinking another French warship along the way.

Towards the end of World War II, the Penang Strait was also mined by the Allied forces, using air-dropped mines to impede Japanese merchant shipping.

On 17 January 2010, a dragon boat tragedy occurred when the strong currents resulted in a boat collision, capsizing a dragon boat and killing 6 paddlers on board. The incident raised concerns by several officers, especially Shamsir Mohamed, officer of the Marine Department (northern region) and Lai Chew Hock, chairman of the Penang Dragon Boat Association, regarding the suitability for conducting water sports in the Penang Straits. Shamsir cited busy traffic, unpredictable weather, and strong currents for his concerns, while Chew Hock claimed the area was unsuitable for any water sports activities due to debris from fishing boats and strong currents. However, Lim Choo Hooi, chairman of Penang Forward Sports Club, refuted the claim, saying that neither the wave tides nor the monsoon season posed a problem for training sessions. Coaches would need to check sea and weather conditions prior to conducting training sessions. He also said that the tragedy site was protected from tsunamis and strong waves and had been used for training for three years, making it one of the safest stretches of public shoreline.

== Transportation and Infrastructure ==
Routes across Penang Strait as of 2014

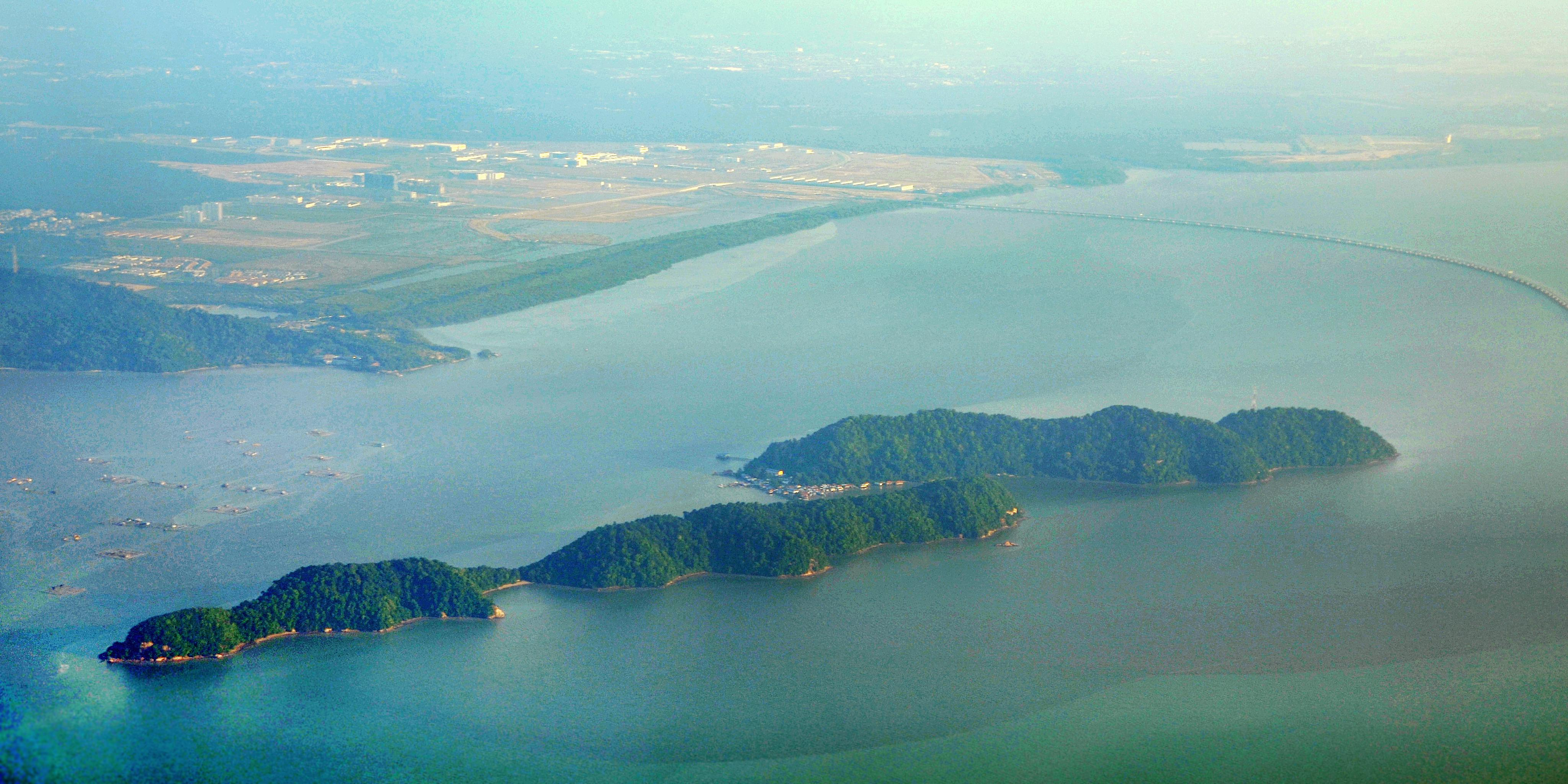
Aerial view of Gedung Island (left) and Aman Island (right) with Juru and the eastern end of the Penang Second Bridge in the background

=== Bridges ===
Two bridges now traverse the Penang Strait - the Penang Bridge and the Second Penang Bridge. The Penang Bridge, completed in 1985, connects Perai on the mainland with the suburb of Gelugor on Penang Island. In 2014, the Second Penang Bridge further south was opened for public use, thereby substituting the Penang Bridge as the longest bridge in Southeast Asia. The Second Penang Bridge runs between Batu Kawan on the mainland and Batu Maung on the island.

To bolster Penang's electricity grid, Tenaga Nasional Berhad (TNB) initiated a RM500 million cross-straits electric grid project in 2022. This significant investment aims to deliver a substantial 2,000 megawatts (MW) of power from the national grid to the island. The project encompasses an 8.5-kilometre-long (5.3 mi) monopole transmission line, while six of the 31 towers will boast a unique betel nut design, making them a visually striking landmark alongside the iconic Penang Bridge.

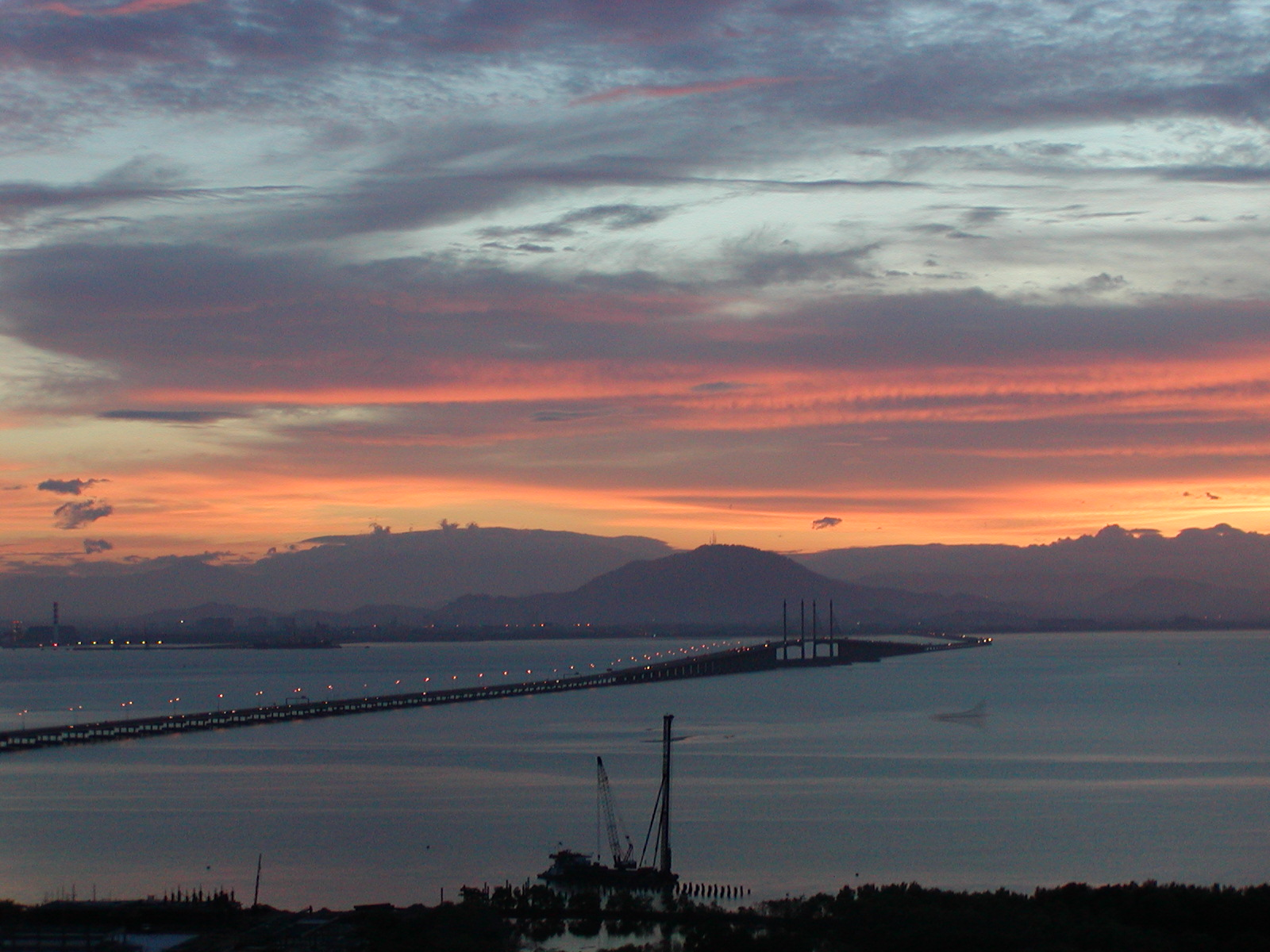
The 13.5-kilometre-long (8.4 mi) Penang Bridge traverses the South Channel between Gelugor on Penang Island and Perai in the mainland.

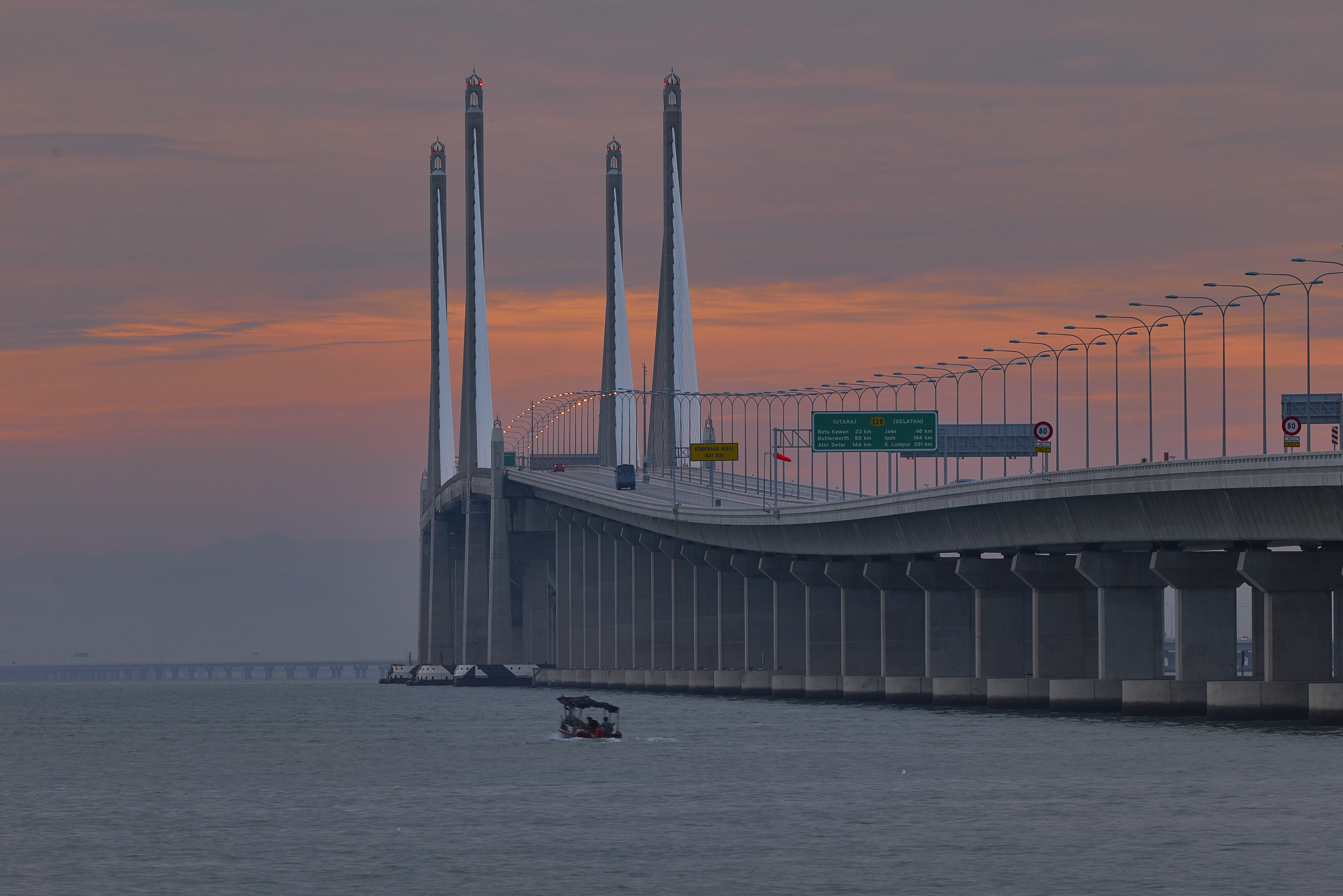
The 24 km (15 mi) Sultan Abdul Halim Muadzam Shah Bridge connecting Batu Maung and Batu Kawan.

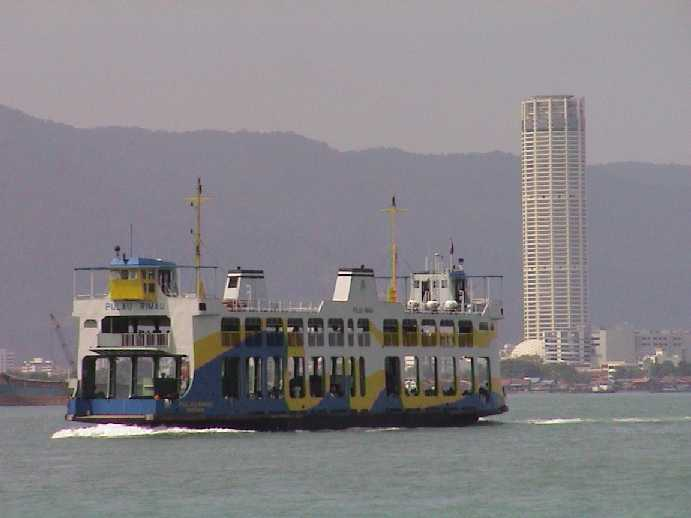
A Penang Ferry crossing the Penang Strait.

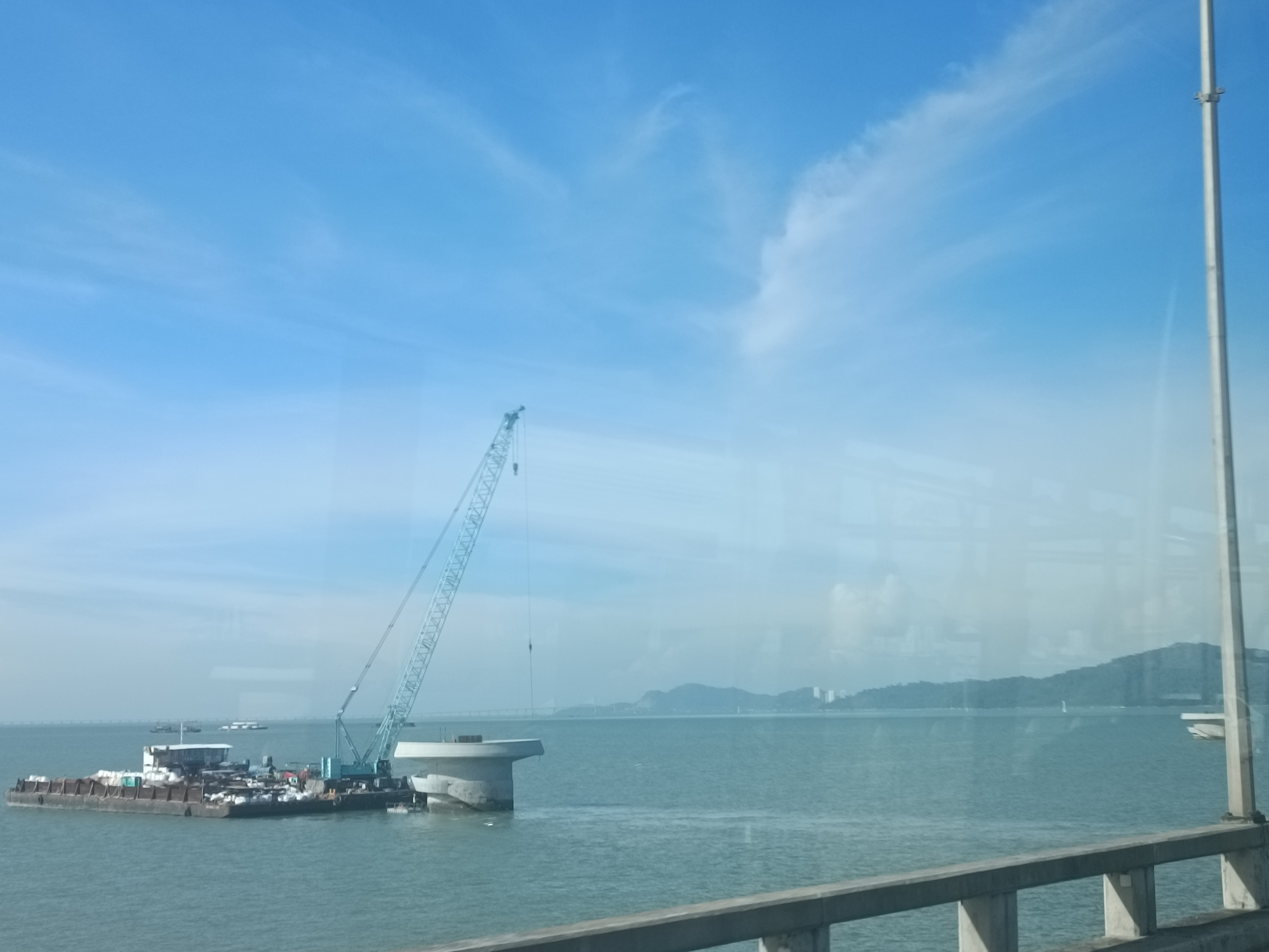
TNB monopoles under construction as of 2024 seen from Penang Bridge

=== Ferry ===
In addition to the two bridges, Penang ferry service is another transportation link between Penang Island and the mainland (Penang Sentral). Unlike the two bridges, the ferry service operates out of a terminal within the heart of George Town, offering a direct link into the city centre for those entering from the mainland.

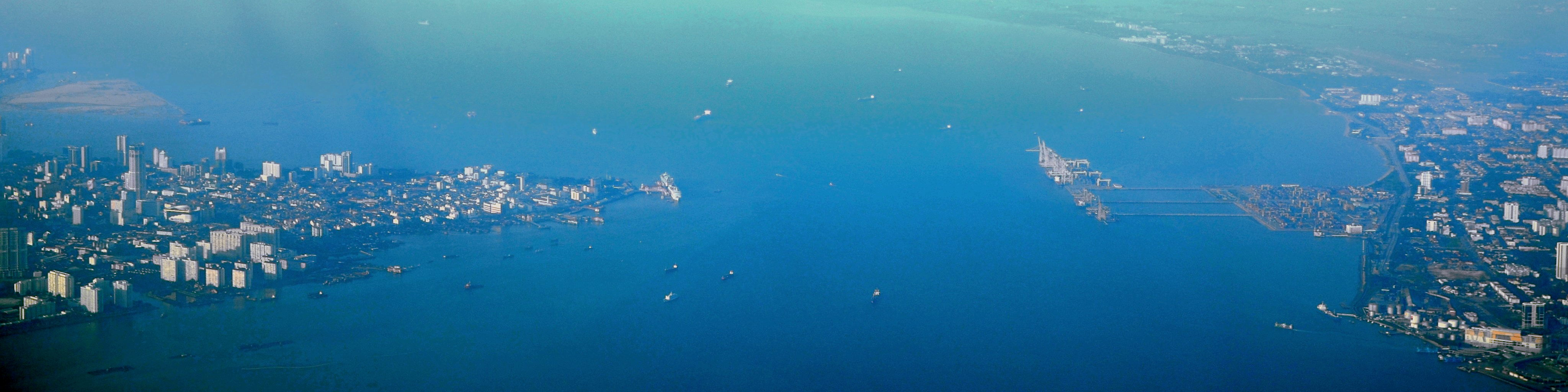
Ferry crossing between the North and South Channels

== Literature ==
- Bjorn Kjerfve "Oceanographic Observations and Numerical Modeling of Circulation and Dispersion in Penang Strait, Malaysia." Belle W. Baruch Institute for Marine Biology and Coastal Research, University of South Carolina
