= Clan Jetties =

Neighbourhood of George Town, Penang, Malaysia

- Neighbourhood of George Town
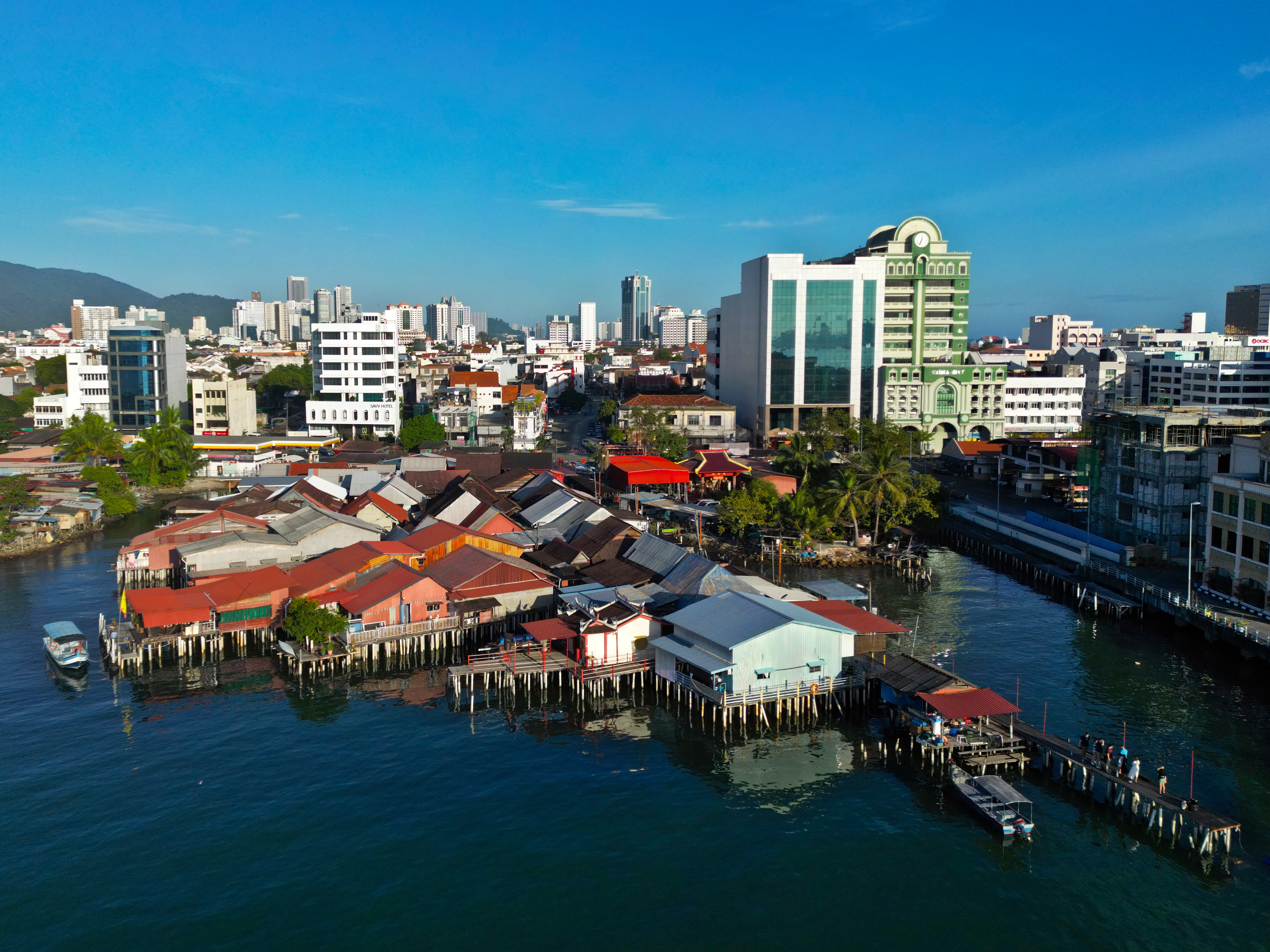
- Lim Jetty
- Interactive map of Clan Jetties
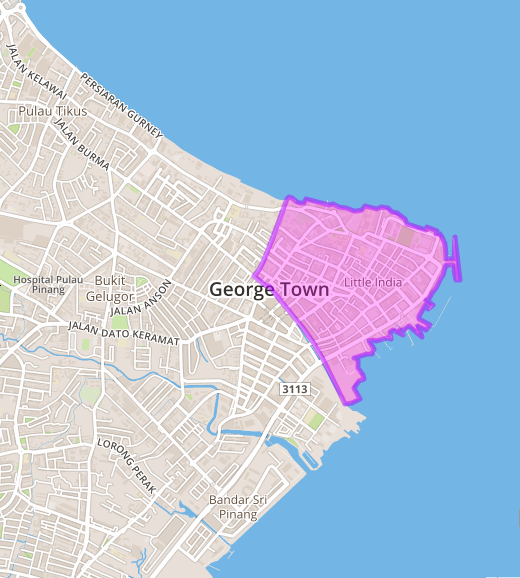
- Location within George Town in Penang
- Coordinates: 5°24′47.304″N 100°20′28.6074″E
- Country: Malaysia
- State: Penang
- City: George Town
- District: Northeast
- Time zone: UTC+8 (MST)
  - Summer (DST): Not observed
- Postal code: 10300

UNESCO World Heritage Site
- Type: Cultural
- Criteria: ii, iii, iv
- Designated: 2008 (32nd session)
- Part of: George Town UNESCO Core Zone
- Reference no.: 1223
- Region: Asia-Pacific

The Clan Jetties form a residential neighbourhood within the city of George Town in the Malaysian state of Penang. Situated within the city's central business district, it now comprises seven wooden villages lining the coastal road of Weld Quay, each owned by residents of a specific Chinese clan – Ong, Lim, Chew, Tan, Lee, Mixed Clan and Yeoh jetties.

The community of Clan Jetties came into existence gradually over a period spanning from the 1880s to the 1960s. In total, nine clan villages were built, but developments post-independence reduced their number to the current seven. After the city centre was designated a World Heritage Site by UNESCO in 2008, the Clan Jetties became a heritage tourism destination.

== History ==
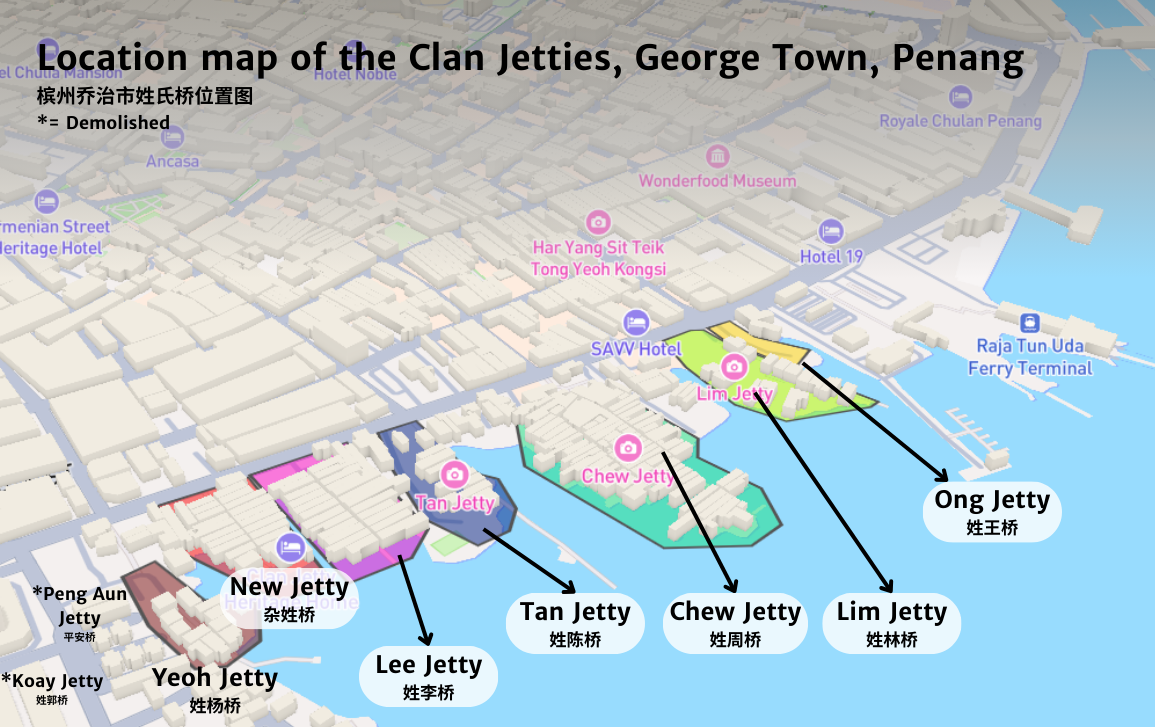
Locations of the jetties

George Town as an entrepôt had attracted waves of immigration from southern China. The Hokkien-speaking immigrants from Fujian, in particular, had settled within the vicinity of the coastline, at areas such as at Tok Aka Lane, Acheen Street, Armenian Street and Stewart Lane.

In 1882, land was reclaimed along the former shoreline, creating what is now Weld Quay. This made it possible to build ghats along the reclaimed coastline, which in turn allowed for the construction of landing jetties. The jetties became the main point of arrival for new Chinese immigrants, and were gradually taken over by members of specific clans for the loading and unloading of cargo, as well as for sampan mooring. Rudimentary accommodations were built, which eventually became communal residences for these clans.

The Clan Jetties saw constant expansion as the immigrants from Fujian continued to arrive. Clan associations provided the immigrants, who preferred to settle in clan lines, with accommodation, employment and protection. Over time, the clans became segmented by occupation. The Ongs, Lims, Chews and Lees predominantly worked as boatmen, while the Tans, Yeohs and Koays were involved primarily in charcoal and firewood trading.

Before Malaya attained independence, the British authorities had promised residents of the Clan Jetties legal recognition of their homes. Following independence however, the residents were only provided with Temporary Occupation Licenses (TOL) that needed to be renewed annually, a status quo that remains to this day. This left residents vulnerable to development pressure as there were no guarantees of compensation if their houses were acquired for development.

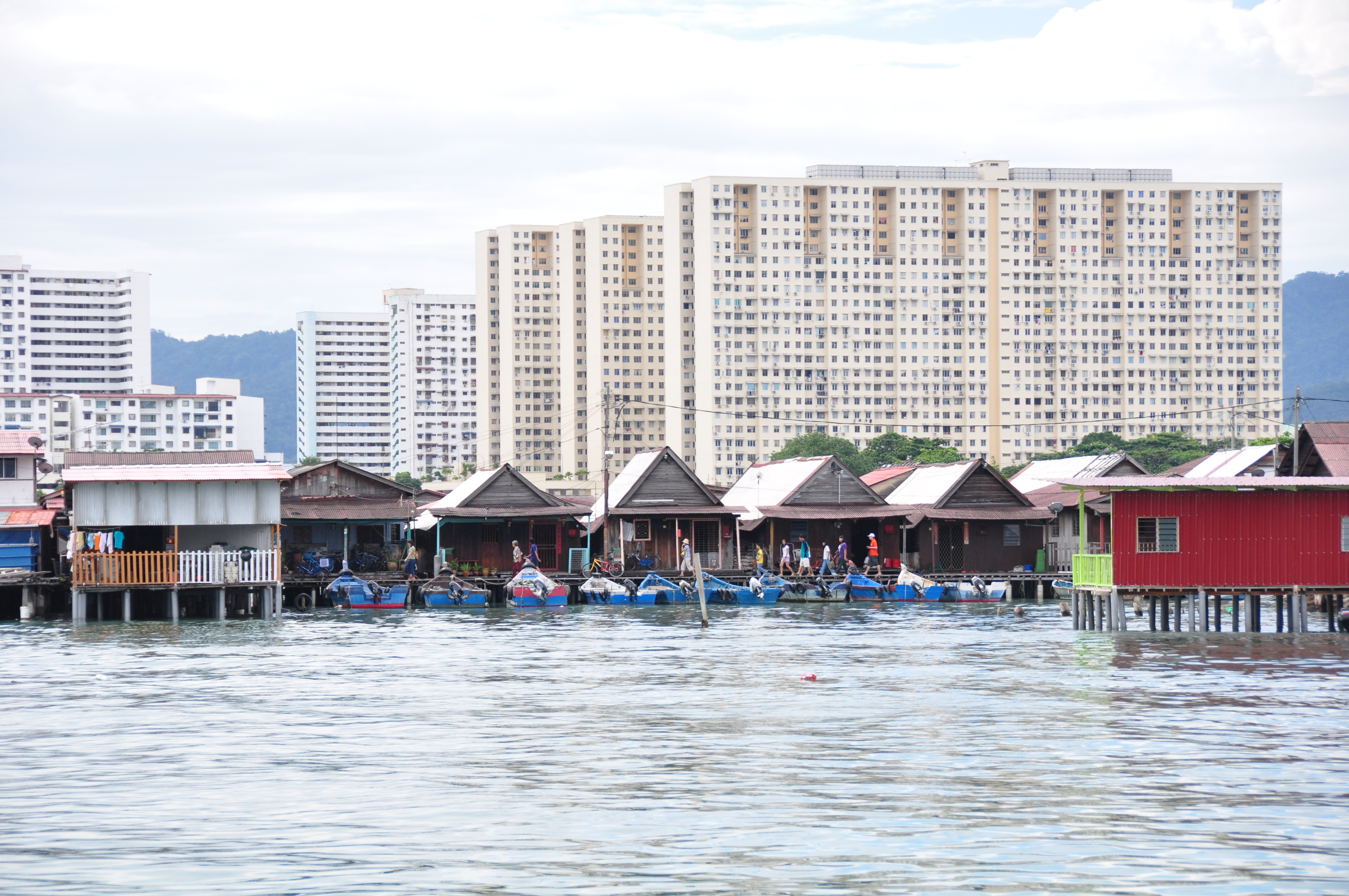
The Koay and Peng Aun jetties were demolished in 2006 to make way for high-rise residences (in the background).

The Clan Jetties were once considered “slums” in the face of "neoliberal urbanisation" policies that promoted the city's vertical growth. The Barisan Nasional-led state government at the time sought to demolish the Clan Jetties and relocate its inhabitants to high-rise complexes. The proposed demolition of the Clan Jetties, along with economic development that caused a shift in the workforce away from labour-intensive jobs, caused an exodus of the younger population from the area. The remaining residents of the Clan Jetties and local interest groups protested the redevelopment of the area, partly due to fears of the underlying racial agenda that favoured Malay land ownership under Prime Minister Mahathir Mohamad and concerns about the potential loss of intangible heritage.

The Koay and Peng Aun jetties were eventually destroyed in 2006. The UNESCO listing of the city centre as a World Heritage Site in 2008 prevented further redevelopment of the Clan Jetties, while simultaneously transforming the area into a tourist attraction. The shift towards heritage tourism has since led to additional concerns about liveability and gentrification at the jetties, exacerbated by the ageing population of the area. As part of ongoing efforts to preserve the Clan Jetties, the Penang Island City Council has designated almost all buildings at the Clan Jetties as Category II-protected structures and introduced guidelines to limit the overdependence on tourism.

=== Ong Jetty ===
The Ong Jetty, the northernmost point of the Clan Jetties, was primarily occupied by the Ong clan from Luanmeishe in Tong'an, Xiamen. The jetty consisted of simple structures that served as resting sheds for the clan's boatmen. The jetty was eventually incorporated into the present-day Raja Tun Uda Ferry Terminal.

=== Lim Jetty ===
The Lim Jetty is dominated by the Lim clan, who originally hailed from Houcunzhuang in Tong'an, Xiamen. The jetty suffered severe damage during the Japanese invasion in 1941 and was subsequently rebuilt after the war. It is characterised by houses with zinc roofs that are segregated into two distinct areas, with a single row of wooden huts lining the seafront walkway. The Lim Jetty is also home to a few places of worship that are dedicated to Chinese deities such as Mazu, Yama and Shennong, among others.

=== Chew Jetty ===
The most visited of the Clan Jetties, the Chew Jetty was developed by the Chew clan originating from Xinglinshe in Tong'an, Xiamen. It is the focal point of the annual Jade Emperor’s birthday celebrations falling on the ninth day of the Chinese New Year. The jetty also houses places of worship dedicated to Chinese deities, including Baosheng and Xuantian. Following the inscription of the city centre as a UNESCO World Heritage Site, heritage tourism grew at Chew Jetty, resulting in an estimated 30% of the houses being converted into commercial outlets as of 2017.

=== Tan Jetty ===
The Tan Jetty is predominantly occupied by the Tan clan from Bingzhoushe in Tong'an, Xiamen. The forefathers of the Tan Jetty community initially settled at Armenian Street before moving to the present-day jetty, where they constructed sheds to serve as rain shelters. The jetty also houses shrines dedicated to Chinese deities Tan Goan-kong and Mazu.

=== Lee Jetty ===
The Lee Jetty was originally located at the Raja Tun Uda Ferry Terminal. The development of the ferry terminal in the early 1960s forced the Lee clan – who hailed from Duishancun in Tong'an, Xiamen – to relocate to the current Lee Jetty. The jetty has one shrine dedicated to Baosheng.

=== Mixed Clan Jetty ===
Also known as the 'New Jetty', the Mixed Clan Jetty was built in 1962. Unlike the other jetties that are primarily occupied by separate clans, this jetty accommodates residents of various surnames. Construction of the new jetty followed stricter post-independence planning requirements from the state's Land Office. Two of the houses were demolished to make way for water-carrying submarine pipelines in 1973.

=== Yeoh Jetty ===
The southernmost point of the Clan Jetties, the Yeoh Jetty was dominated by the Yeoh clan of Xiayangcun in Haicheng. The jetty was damaged during the Japanese invasion, displacing most of its original inhabitants. Following post-independence land reclamation, much of the jetty now sits on dry land.

=== Demolished jetties ===
==== Koay Jetty ====
The Koay Jetty was developed in the 1950s by the Koay clan from Baiqipu in Hui'an County, whose ancestors were Hui Muslim traders from Quanzhou. The Koays who migrated to Penang eventually assimilated with the wider Chinese community and distanced themselves from their original Muslim faith. The Koay Jetty once served as a hub for charcoal trade. After independence, land reclamation led to the jetty being engulfed by mangrove forest. The jetty was destroyed in 2006 to accommodate newer residential developments.

==== Peng Aun Jetty ====
Peng Aun Jetty (Chinese: 平安; Pe̍h-ōe-jī: Pêng-an; lit. 'peace') came into existence in the 1960s and was home to residents with different surnames. It too was demolished along with the Koay Jetty in 2006 to make way for residential developments.

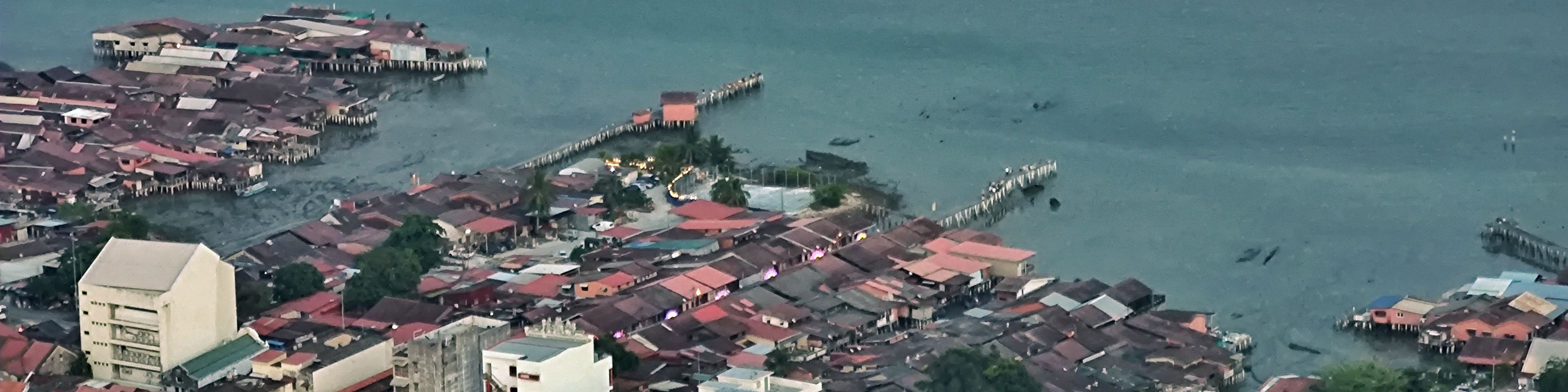
The Clan Jetties viewed from the Komtar tower
