= Aman Island =

Islet in South Seberang Perai District, Penang, Malaysia

Native name: Pulau Aman
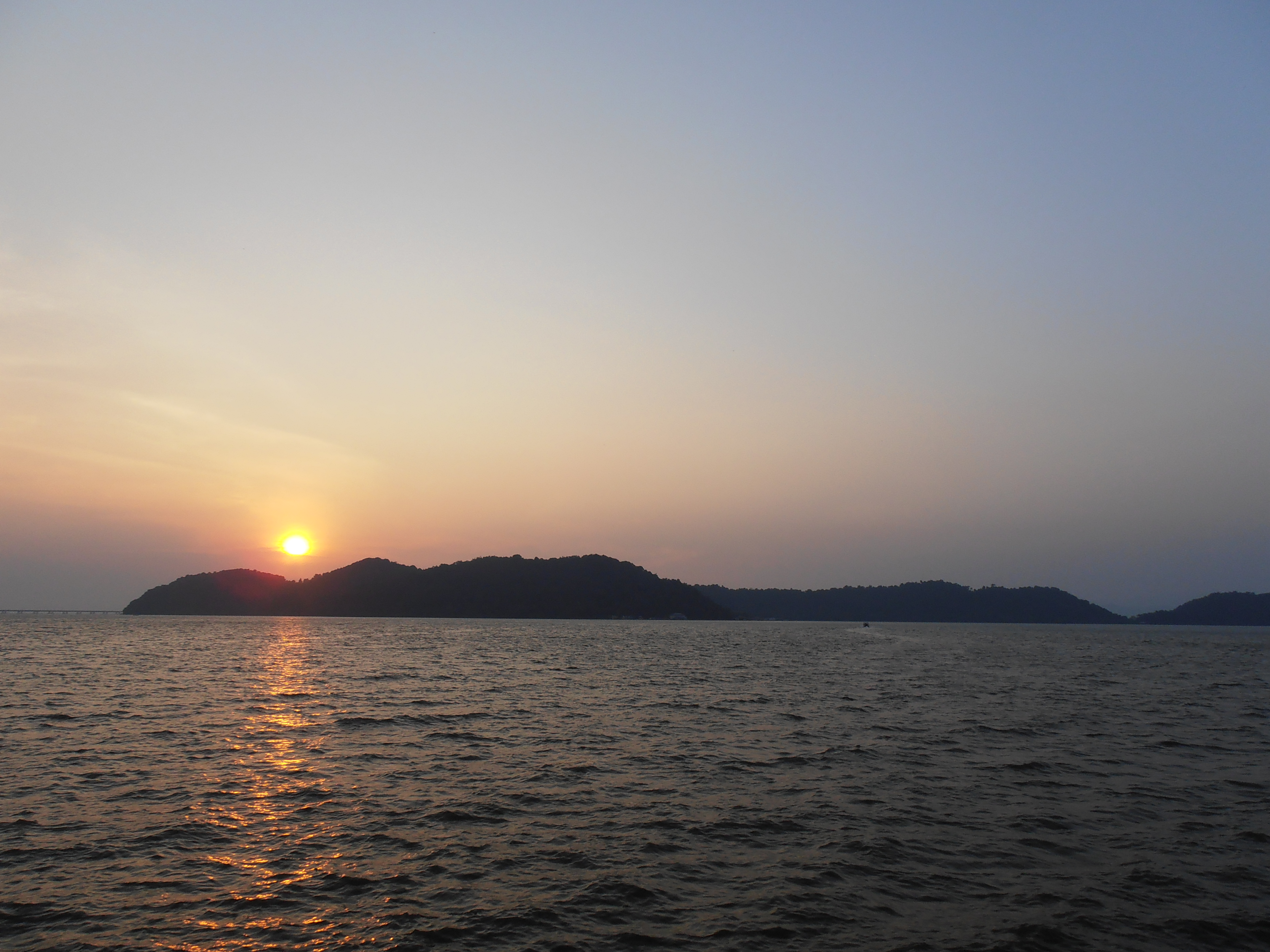

Geography
- Location: Penang Strait
- Coordinates: 5°15′43.6536″N 100°23′15.5472″E
- Archipelago: Kra Islands

Administration
- Malaysia
- State: Penang
- City: Seberang Perai
- District: South Seberang Perai
- Mukim: 16

Aman Island is an islet in South Seberang Perai District, Penang, Malaysia, located off the coast of Seberang Perai.

Known as the "Island of Peace", it is a home to a traditional Malay village. Places of interest in Aman Island include Jalan Telaga Emas, Batu Perompak, and the nearby Gedung Island.

== Demographics ==
Ethnicities within Aman Island in 2020
Ethnicities / Nationality	Percentage
Malays	100%

The Aman and Gedung islands constitute Mukim 16, a subdivision within Seberang Perai. Aman Island is home to a fishing village, while Gedung Island is uninhabited. As of 2020, Aman Island had a population of 191, consisting entirely of Malays. Mukim 16 was the only entirely Malay subdivision in Penang.

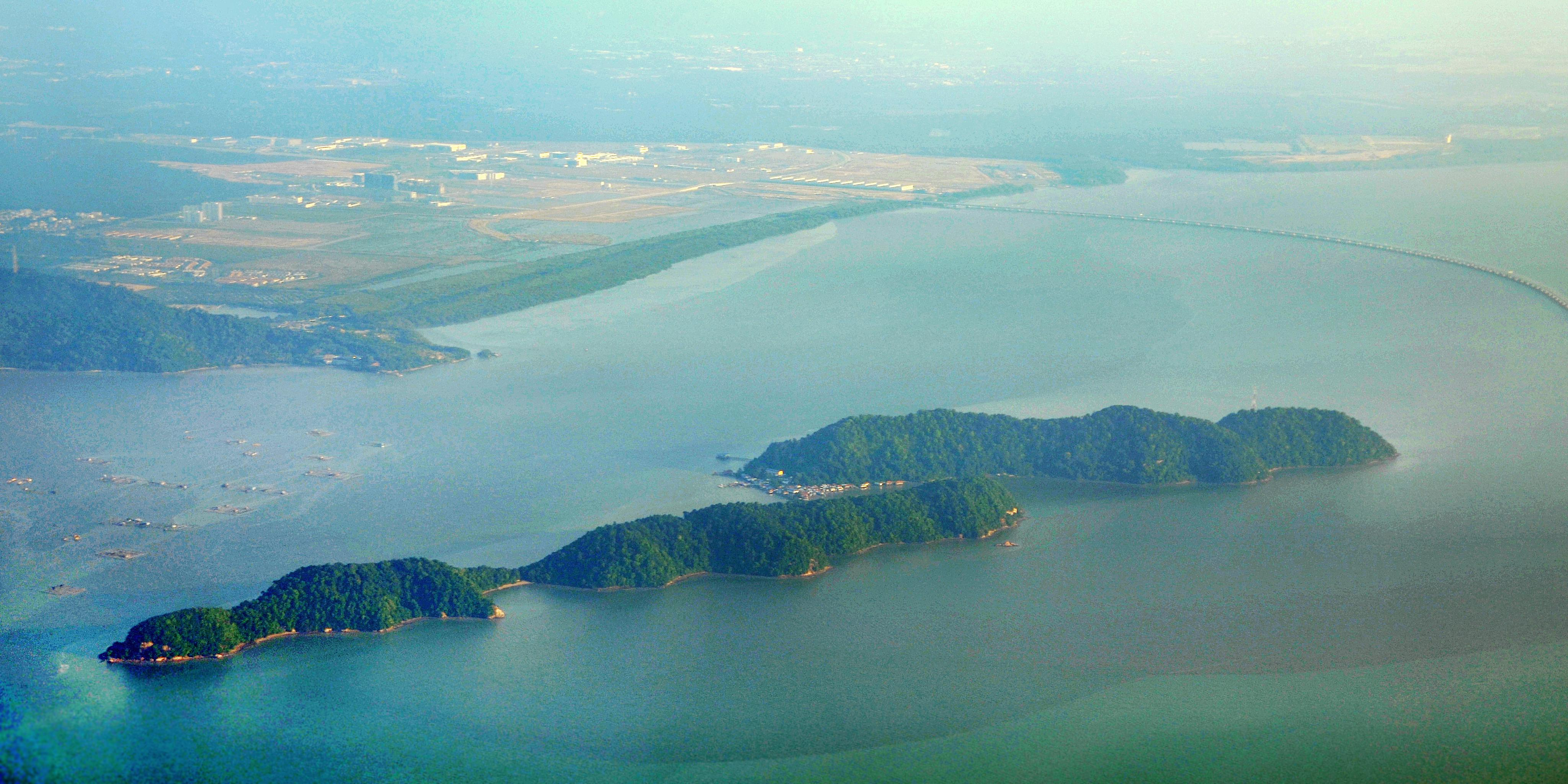
Aerial view of Gedung Island (left) and Aman Island (right) with Juru and the eastern end of the Penang Second Bridge in the background

== See also ==
- List of islands of Malaysia
