= Gedung Island =

Islet in South Seberang Perai District, Penang, Malaysia

Native name: Pulau Gedung
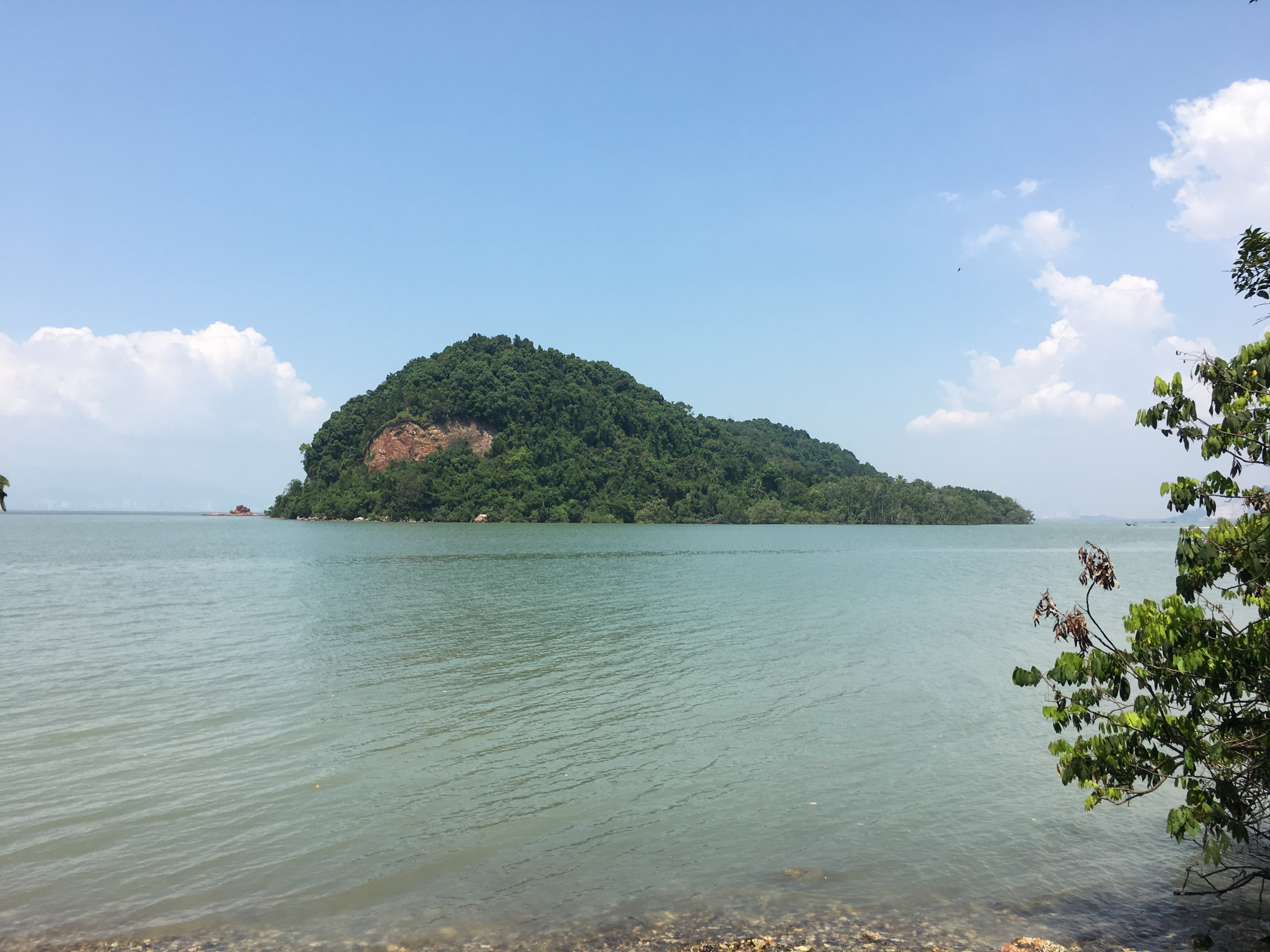
- Gedung Island as viewed from Aman Island

Geography
- Location: Penang Strait
- Coordinates: 5°16′37.542″N 100°23′13.704″E
- Archipelago: Kra Islands

Administration
- Malaysia
- State: Penang
- City: Seberang Perai
- District: South Seberang Perai
- Mukim: 16

Gedung Island is an islet in South Seberang Perai District, Penang, Malaysia, located off the coast of Seberang Perai. Unlike neighbouring Aman Island, it is uninhabited, but is visited occasionally by hikers and nature enthusiasts.

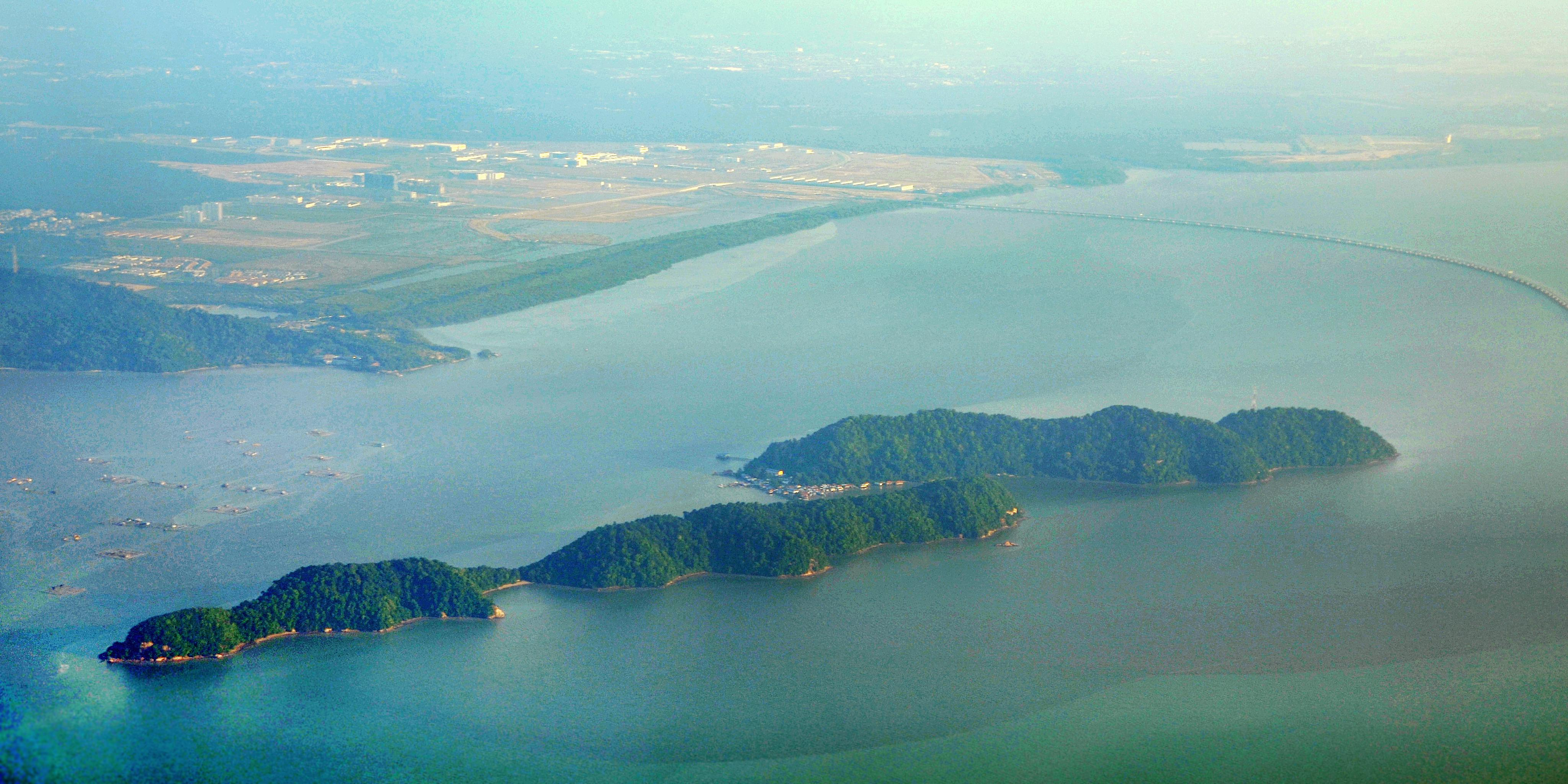
Aerial view of Gedung Island (left) and Aman Island (right) with Juru and the eastern end of the Penang Second Bridge in the background

Batu Payung islet, an outcrop comprising red rock and sand lies off its southwestern coast and is popular with fishing enthusiasts. Some nearby residents claim that Zheng He visited it before reaching Penang Island.

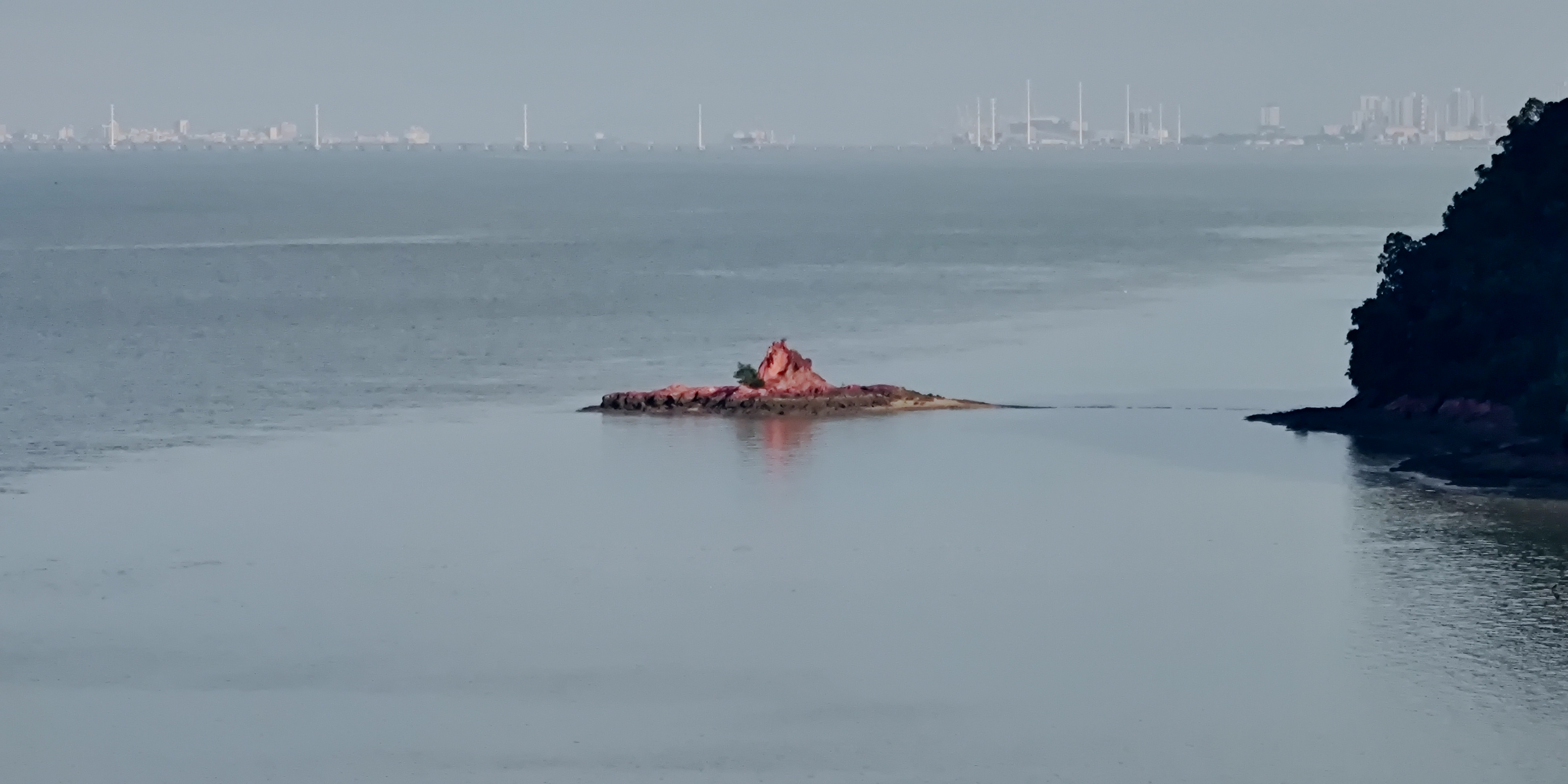
Batu Payung islet off Gedung Island, viewed from Aman Island with George Town and Butterworth in the background

== See also ==
- List of islands of Malaysia
