= Swettenham Pier =

Pier in George Town, Penang, Malaysia

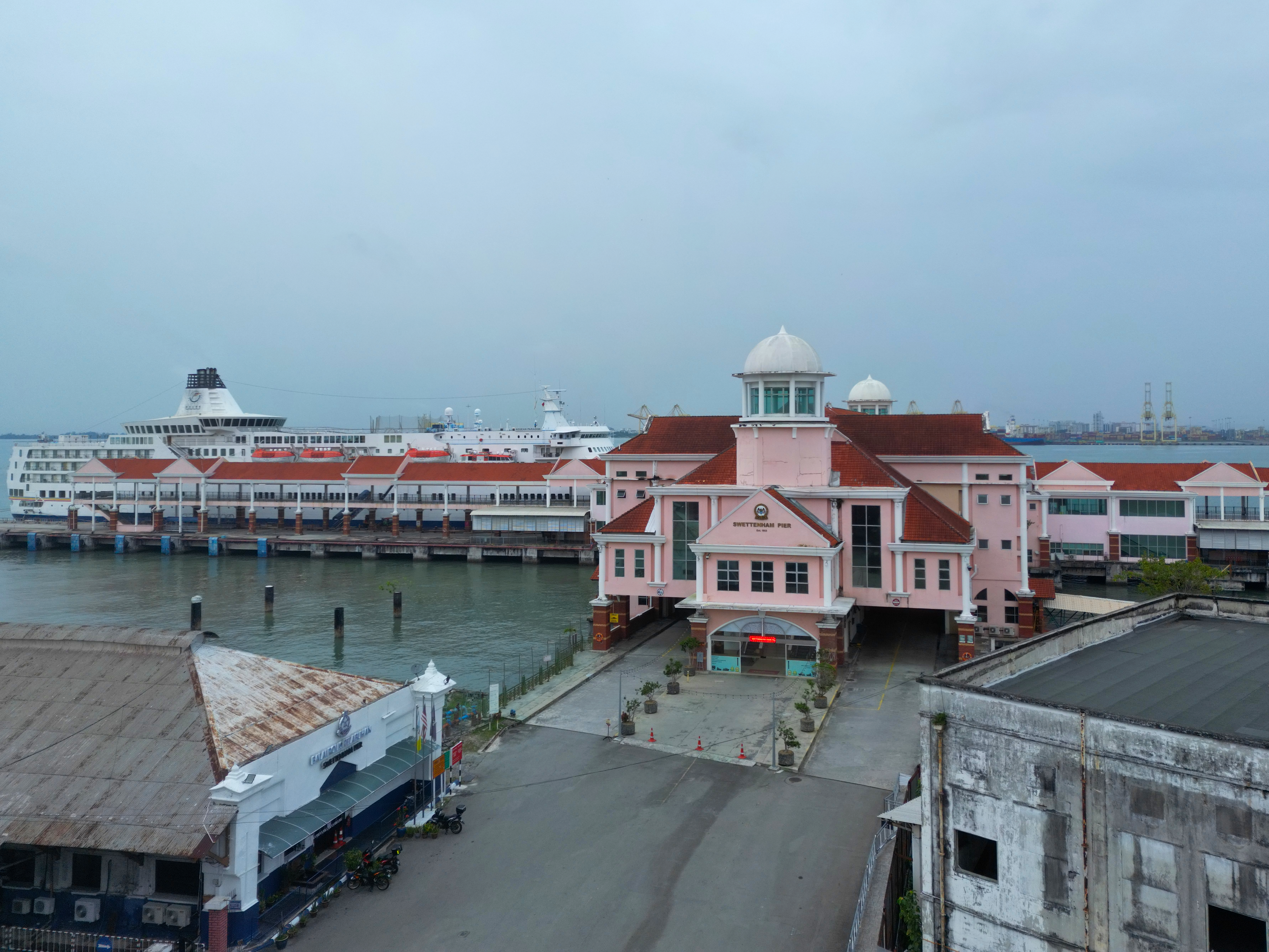
- Carries: Cruise vessels
- Spans: Penang Strait
- Location: George Town, Penang
- Coordinates: 5.418933°N 100.346329°E
- Owner: Penang Port Commission
- Maintained by: Penang Port Sdn Bhd

Characteristics
- Construction: Coude, Sons & Matthews
- Total length: 400 m (1,300 ft)

History
- Opening date: 1904; 122 years ago
- Location within George Town, Penang
- Location within George Town, Penang

UNESCO World Heritage Site
- Type: Cultural
- Criteria: ii, iii, iv
- Designated: 2008 (32nd session)
- Part of: George Town UNESCO Core Zone
- Reference no.: 1223
- Region: Asia-Pacific

Swettenham Pier is a pier within the city of George Town in the Malaysian state of Penang. Established in 1904, it is the busiest port-of-call in Malaysia for cruise shipping. The pier plays a vital role as a major entry point for tourists into Penang, aside from the Penang International Airport and land connections.

Other than cruise shipping, Swettenham Pier, located at Weld Quay, has hosted warships as well. Navy ships from several nations, including Singapore, Thailand and the United States, have berthed at the pier in the past.

== History ==
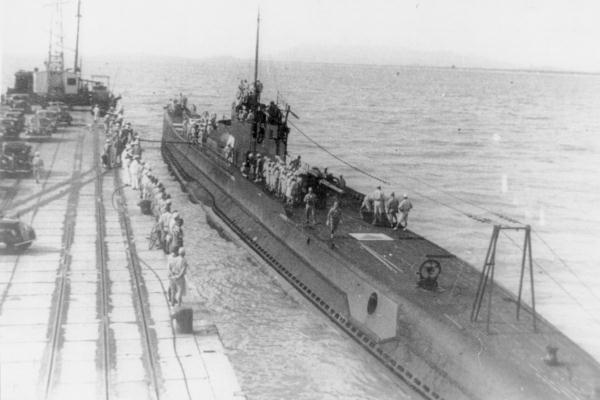
Japanese submarine I-10 at Swettenham Pier in 1942

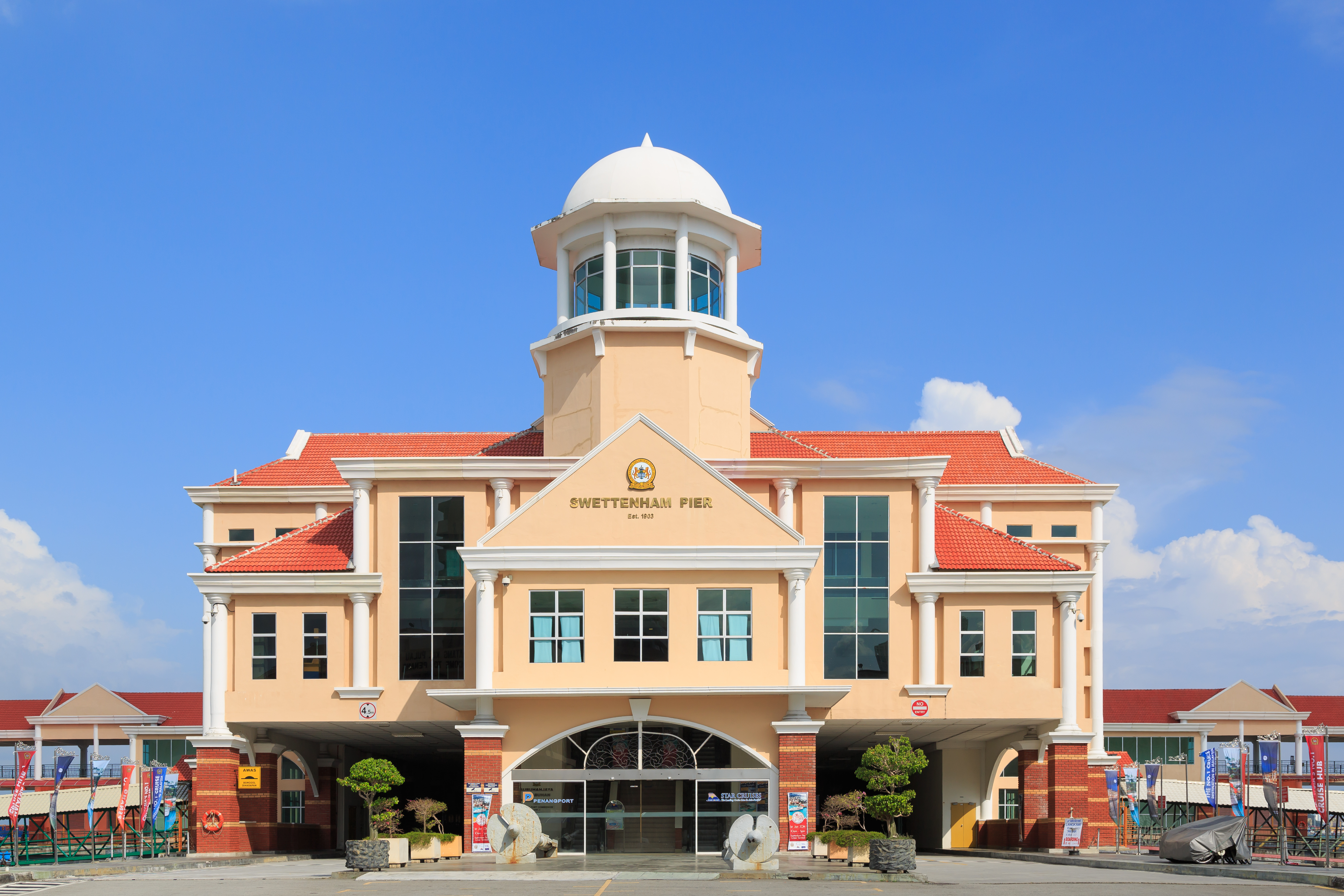
Swettenham Pier Cruise Terminal building, completed in 2009, contains immigration clearance facilities.

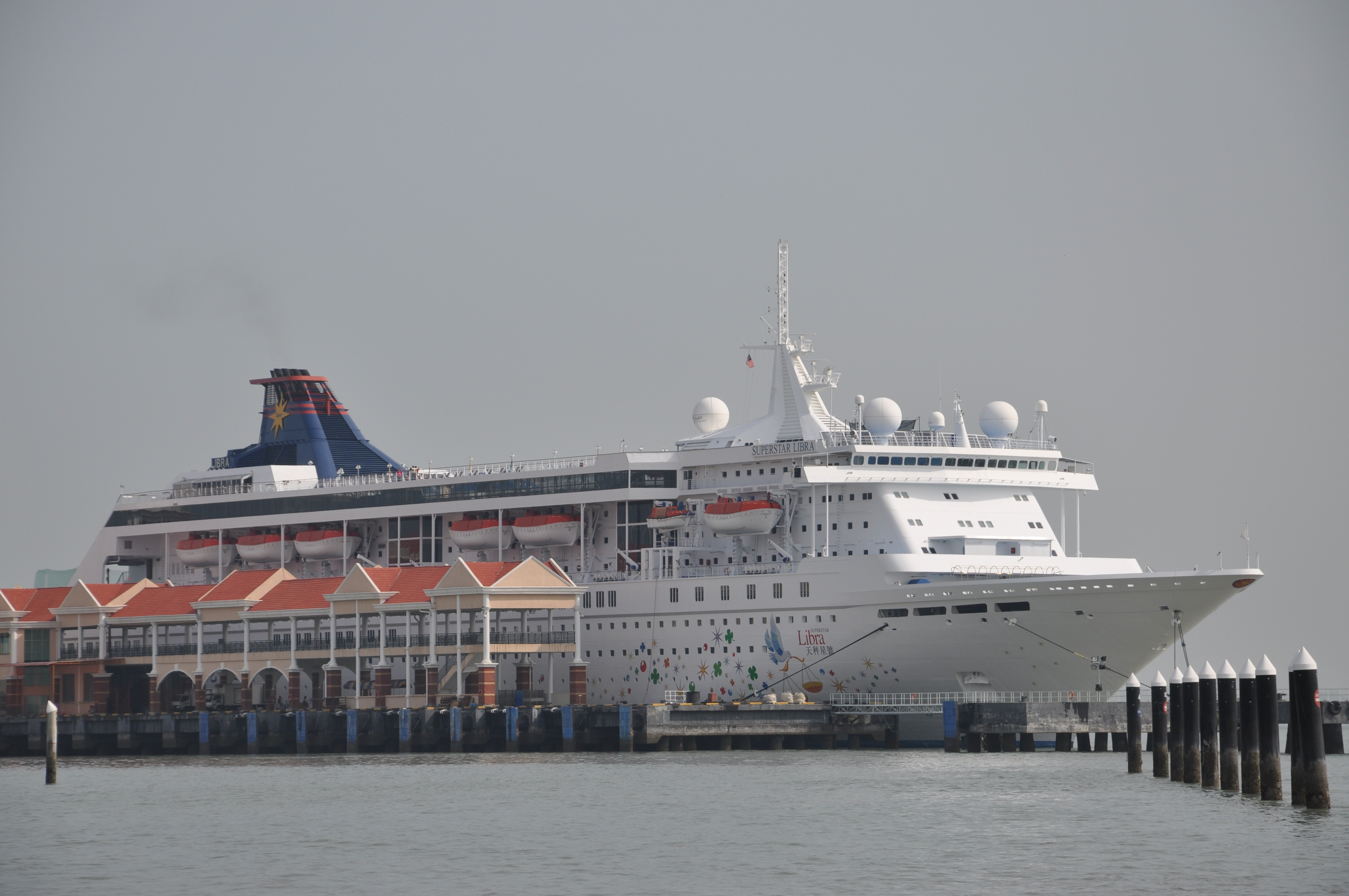
SuperStar Libra cruise ship at Swettenham Pier

Towards the end of the 19th century, as maritime traffic into the Port of Penang continued to increase and railway lines in the Malay Peninsula were being built, the expansion of the Port of Penang became crucial. The construction of Swettenham Pier, undertaken by engineers Coude, Sons and Matthews, commenced in 1901. Upon its completion in 1904, the T-shaped pier provided 600 ft (180 m) of wharfage.

Originally, the pier was known as the 'Iron Pier'. It was subsequently renamed Swettenham Pier, in honour of Frank Swettenham, the then Governor of the Straits Settlements.

Swettenham Pier's initial capacity proved insufficient. In 1911, the pier was extended by 345 ft (105 m) to the north and 255 ft (78 m) to the south, bringing the overall length of the pier to 1,200 ft (370 m).

Between 1942 and 1944, at the height of World War II, the pier was used as a submarine base by the Japanese, German and Italian navies.

Up until the late 1960s, steamers and other cargo vessels with a draft of up to 27 ft (8.2 m) used to dock at Swettenham Pier. The pier's heyday was abruptly ended, however, with the revocation of George Town's free port status by the Malaysian federal government in 1969.

In the early 2000s, Swettenham Pier was upgraded into a cruise shipping terminal. The Swettenham Pier Cruise Terminal, with a new three-storey building and an aerobridge, was completed in 2009. George Town's cruise tourism industry has been booming ever since, with Swettenham Pier soon attracting cruise ships of increasing size, such as the RMS Queen Mary 2. In 2017, Swettenham Pier overtook Port Klang as the busiest cruise shipping harbour in Malaysia.

Plans have also been drawn up for the expansion of Swettenham Pier in the near future to accommodate larger cruise ships.

== Operational statistics ==
Year	Total international arrivals
2014	110,715
2015	187,494
2016	213,566
2017	358,529
2018	341,138
2019	409,943
2020	85,691
2021	0
2022	439,012
2023	573,178
2024	650,518

== See also ==
- George Town ferry terminal
