= Port of Penang =

Seaport in the Malaysian state of Penang

Port of Penang Pelabuhan Pulau Pinang
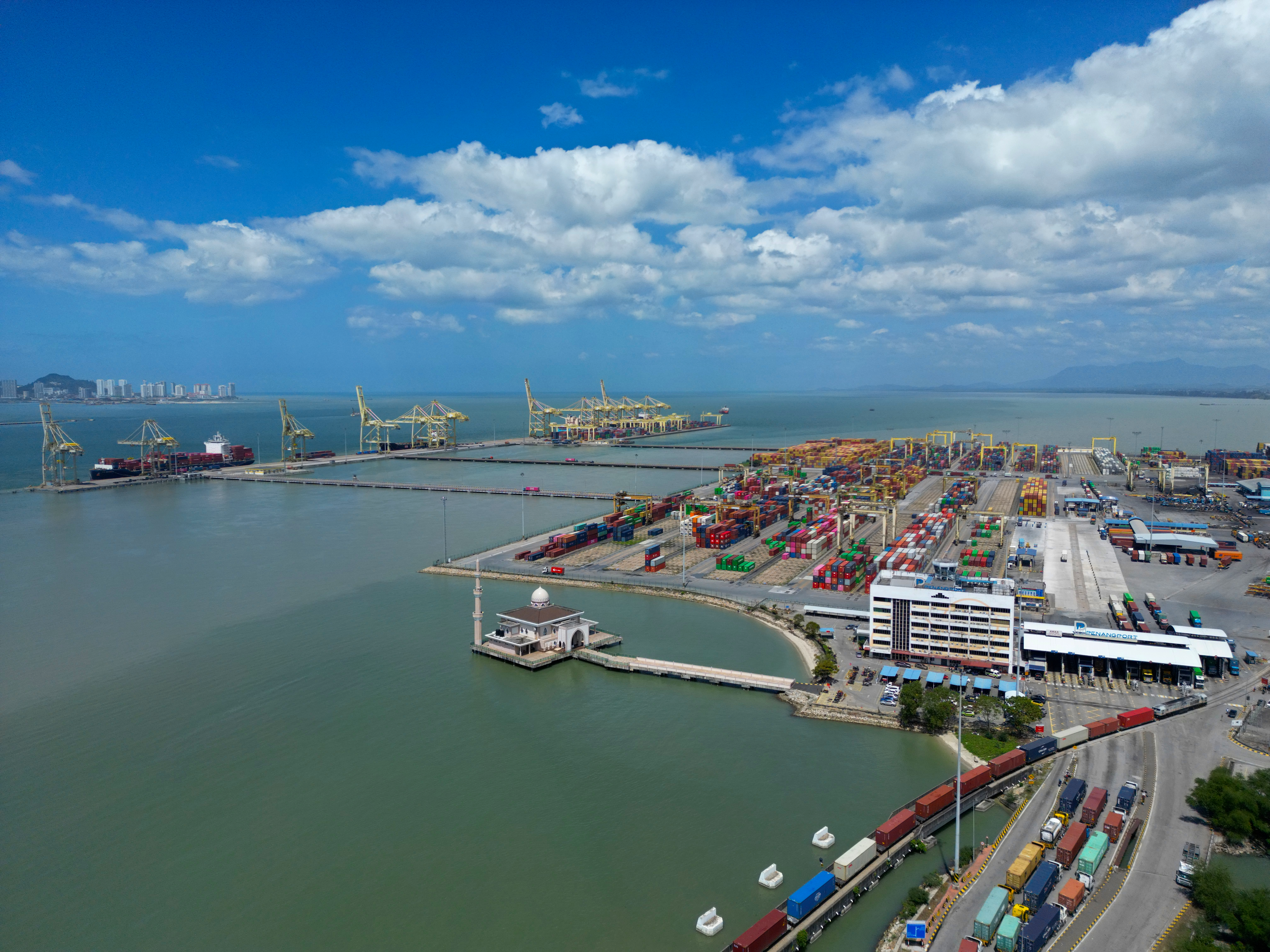
- Click on the map for a fullscreen view

Location
- Country: Malaysia
- Location: Penang
- Coordinates: 5.4157°N 100.36603°E
- UN/LOCODE: MYNTL

Details
- Opened: 1786
- Operated by: Penang Port Sdn Bhd
- Owned by: Penang Port Commission
- Type of harbour: coastal natural
- No. of berths: 26
- Draft depth: 12.0 m.

Statistics
- Annual cargo tonnage: 32.2 million (2024)
- Annual container volume: 1.4 million TEU (2024)
- Website https://www.penangport.com.my/

The Port of Penang is a deepwater seaport within the Malaysian state of Penang. It consists of terminals along the Penang Strait, including five in Seberang Perai and one in George Town. The Port of Penang was the third busiest harbour in Malaysia as of 2024, handling nearly 1.42 million TEUs of cargo, as well as the busiest port-of-call within the country for cruise shipping.

Established in 1786 with the founding of George Town as a free port by the British East India Company, the Port of Penang played a crucial role in Penang's economy, which largely depended on maritime trade. However, the free port status was revoked by the Malaysian federal government in 1969. The Port of Penang was then relocated to Seberang Perai in 1974 to facilitate the handling of larger container vessels. Today, the Port of Penang remains the main harbour and transshipment hub of northern Malaysia.

== History ==
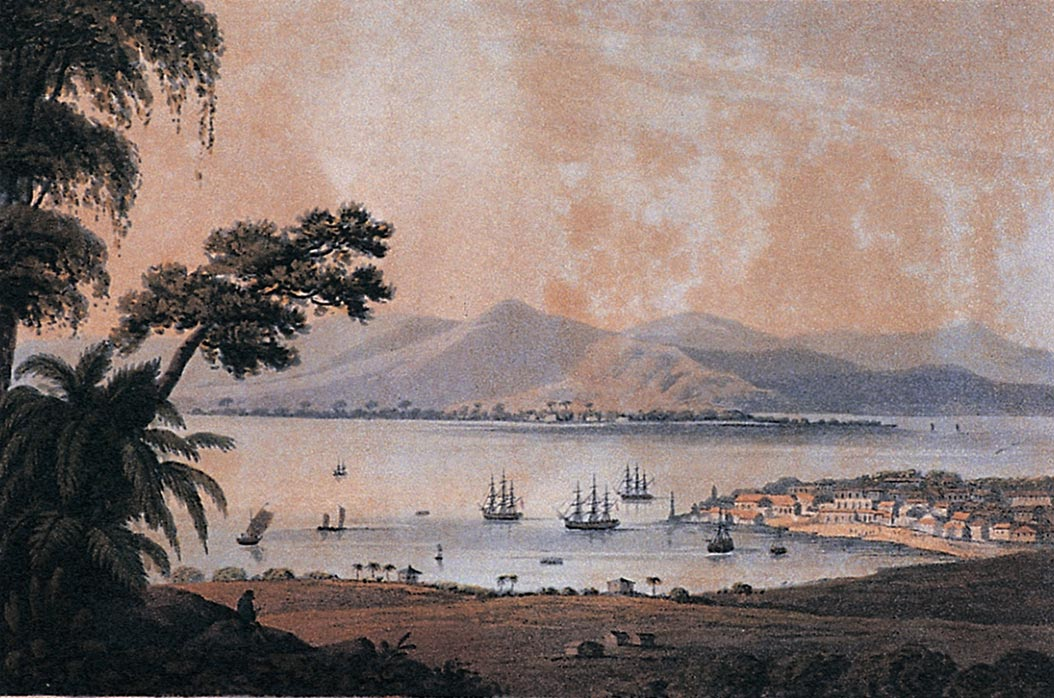
An 1814 print depicting vessels in George Town.

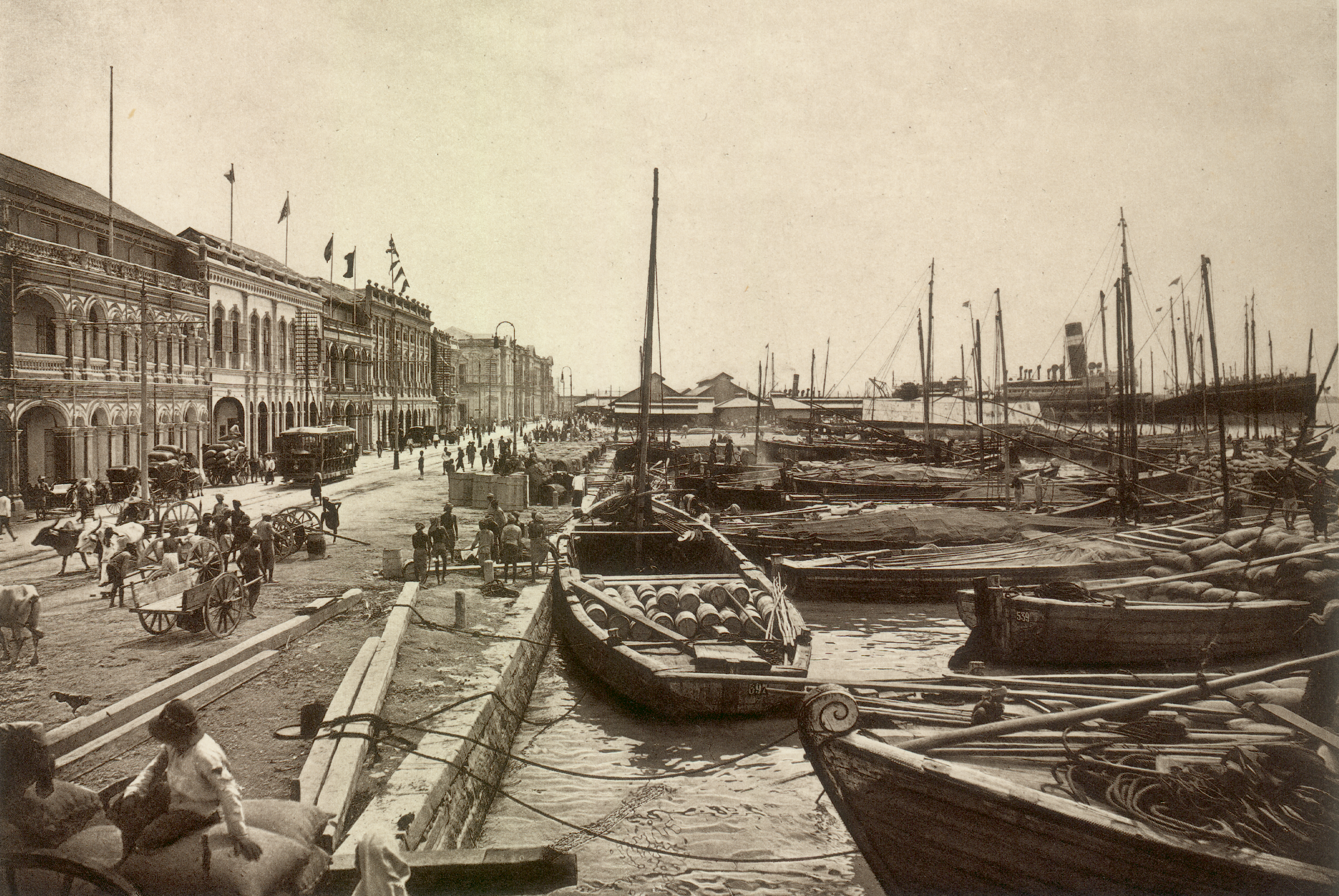
The Port of Penang at Weld Quay, George Town in the 1910s. Land reclamation in the 1880s allowed for the expansion of the harbour.

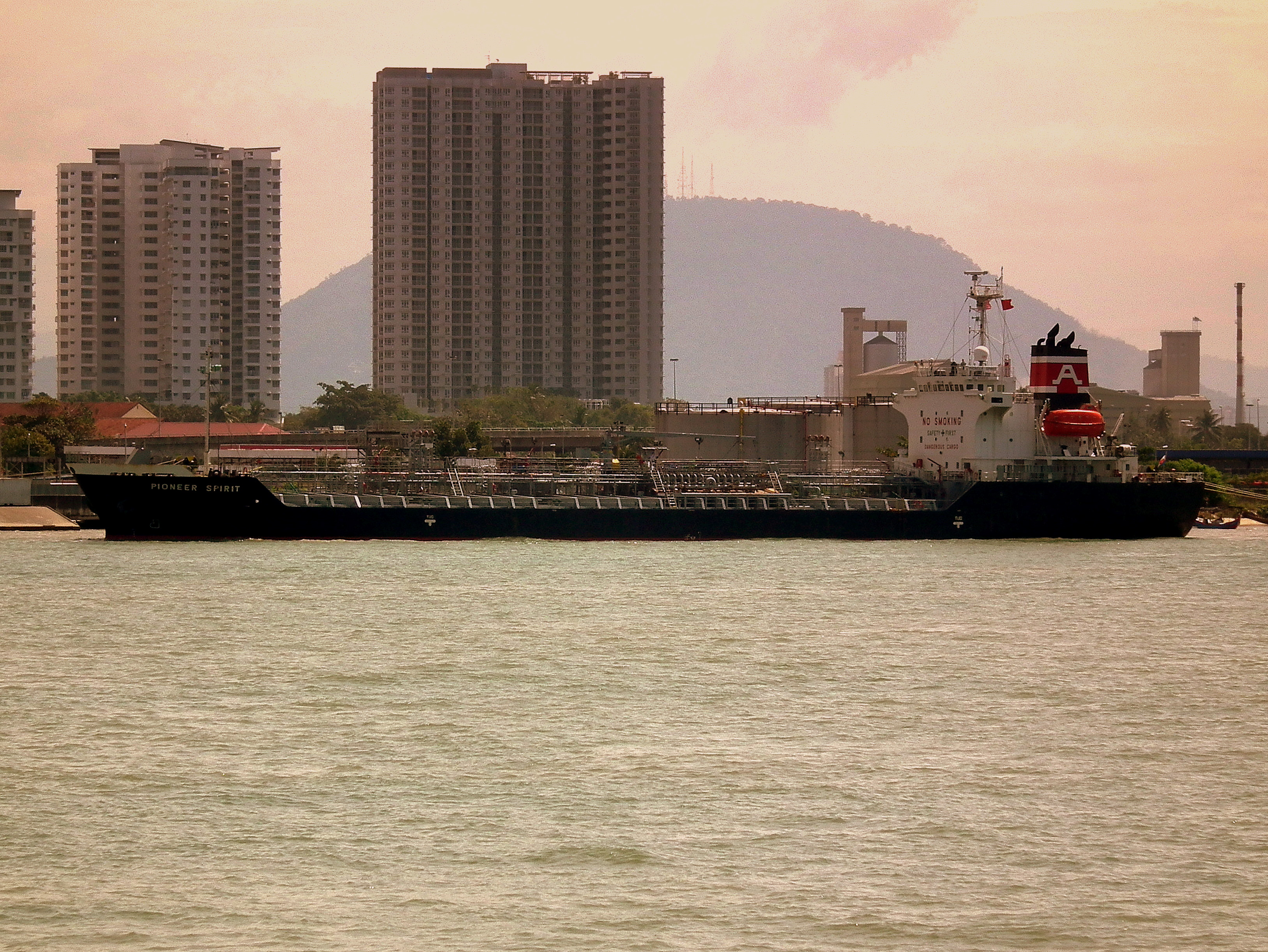
A cargo vessel at the Vegetable Oil Pier

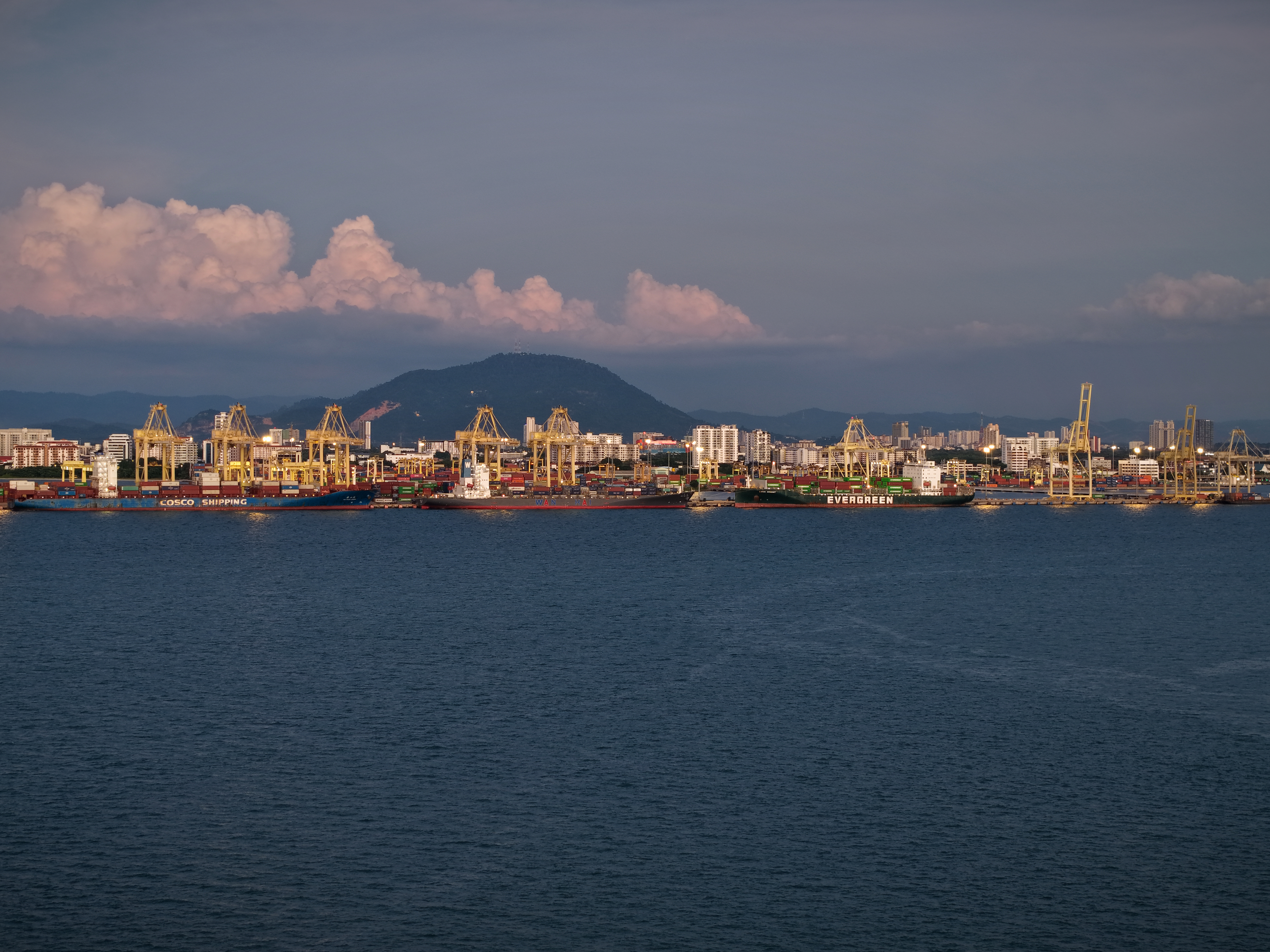
Cargo ships at the North Butterworth Container Terminal (NBCT)

The Port of Penang was established with the founding of George Town by Francis Light in 1786. Light, who had been tasked by the British East India Company to form trade relations in the Malay Peninsula, deduced that by obtaining Penang Island, the British could check Dutch and French territorial ambitions in Southeast Asia. Due to its location in the Malacca Strait along the maritime trade route between India and China, the island could be put to use as a "convenient magazine for trade"; Light added that if "Malay, Bugis and Chinese will come to reside here, it will become the Exchange of the East if not loaded with impositions and restrictions".

The Port of Penang, originally sited in George Town, was founded as a free port, meaning that goods could be traded without the imposition of taxes, duties or tariffs. The measure was intended to attract merchants from the existing Dutch harbours in the region. Consequently, the number of incoming vessels increased exponentially from 85 in 1786 to 3,569 in 1802. In the early 19th century, the Port of Penang became a major conduit for spice exports in Southeast Asia. Spice harvested from agricultural farms throughout Penang would be shipped out for export from the harbours of George Town.

The primacy of the Port of Penang along the Malacca Strait was short-lived, however. After the founding of Singapore by Stamford Raffles in 1819, the Port of Singapore rapidly surpassed the Port of Penang as the preeminent harbour in the region, due to the former's more strategic geographic position.

In spite of that, the Port of Penang continued to prosper throughout the 19th century. External developments, such as the opening of the Suez Canal and the advent of steamships, meant that the Port of Penang became the first port-of-call east of the Indian subcontinent. Meanwhile, the tin mining boom in the Malay Peninsula and southern Siam led to the growth of the Port of Penang as a major tin-exporting harbour, directly challenging the Port of Singapore. Tin from the Kinta Valley and Siam were transported to George Town for smelting, before being exported via the Port of Penang to European and American industries. For several years in the late 19th century, tin exports from the Port of Penang, as well as tin imports into George Town, exceeded those of Singapore.

In the late 1880s, a massive land reclamation in George Town was undertaken to allow for the expansion of the Port of Penang. Following the land reclamation, coastal streets, such as Weld Quay, were created, while new piers and warehouses, including Swettenham Pier, were built. In addition, the first cross-strait ferry service between George Town and Butterworth was launched in 1894. Ferries to Butterworth departed from the several piers along Weld Quay, such as Kedah Pier, Church Street Pier and the FMSR Pier.

During the Japanese occupation of Penang in World War II, the Port of Penang was put to use as a major Axis naval base. Between 1942 and 1944, George Town served as the port of call and a replenishment hub for the submarines of the Imperial Japanese Navy, the Kriegsmarine (of Nazi Germany) and the Regia Marina (of the Kingdom of Italy). At the end of the war, British Royal Marine commandos landed at the Port of Penang on 3 September 1945 under Operation Jurist, liberating Penang Island by the end of the day.

Despite British assurances that George Town would retain its free port status after the independence of Malaya, the free port status was eventually revoked by the Malaysian federal government in 1969. This sparked massive unemployment within Penang, and coupled with the rapid development of Port Klang near Kuala Lumpur, led to the decline of the Port of Penang's maritime trade, as Port Klang assumed the role as Malaysia's main seaport.

In 1974, the Port of Penang was relocated from George Town to Butterworth to accommodate larger container vessels. Since then, the Port of Penang's cargo and container operations are handled at six facilities in mainland Seberang Perai. Meanwhile, Swettenham Pier, the sole remaining harbour facility in George Town, was redeveloped into a cruise shipping terminal in 2009. The pier has since evolved into Malaysia's busiest harbour for cruise ships, overtaking Port Klang in 2017.

== Facilities ==
The Port of Penang consists of seven facilities along the Penang Strait. Six of these are located in Seberang Perai on the mainland, particularly the towns of Butterworth and Perai. Swettenham Pier is the Port's sole terminal on Penang Island.

Location of Port of Penang facilities

The five cargo and container terminals are situated in Butterworth and Perai, whereas Swettenham Pier is the sole passenger-only cruise terminal.

| Location | Terminal | Type | Number of berths | Length (m) | Capacity (kTEU) | Capacity (ton) |
|---|---|---|---|---|---|---|
| Butterworth | North Butterworth Container Terminal | Container | 7 | 1,500 | 2,000 | |
| Butterworth | Butterworth Wharves | Break-bulk cargo | 6 | 1,050 | | 2,500,000 |
| Butterworth | Vegetable Oil Pier | Liquid-bulk cargo | 1 | | | 136,970 |
| Perai | Perai Bulk Cargo Terminal | Dry-bulk cargo | 5 | 632 | | 3,900,000 |
| Perai | Perai Wharves | Dry-bulk cargo | | | | |
| George Town | Swettenham Pier | Passenger | 3 | 400 | | |

== Operating statistics ==
Annual cargo statistics
| Year | Total | |
| Year | Container throughput (TEU) | Cargo throughput (million tonnes) |
|---|---|---|
| 2011 | 1,198,843 | 29,390,817 |
| 2012 | 1,165,733 | 29,577,052 |
| 2013 | 1,123,713 | 30,080,834 |
| 2014 | 1,265,712 | 30,046,660 |
| 2015 | 1,317,352 | 30,314,149 |
| 2016 | 1,437,120 | 30,978,389 |
| 2017 | 1,523,828 | 32,772,658 |
| 2018 | 1,510,376 | 34,408,897 |
| 2019 | 1,490,645 | 33,127,528 |
| 2020 | 1,387,987 | 30,034,628 |
| 2021 | 1,278,006 | 29,178,716 |
| 2022 | 1,299,940 | 30,152,611 |
| 2023 | 1,443,506 | 32,087,587 |
| 2024 | 1,416,450 | 32,274,792 |
