= Weld Quay, George Town =

Road in the Malaysian state of Penang

Weld Quay
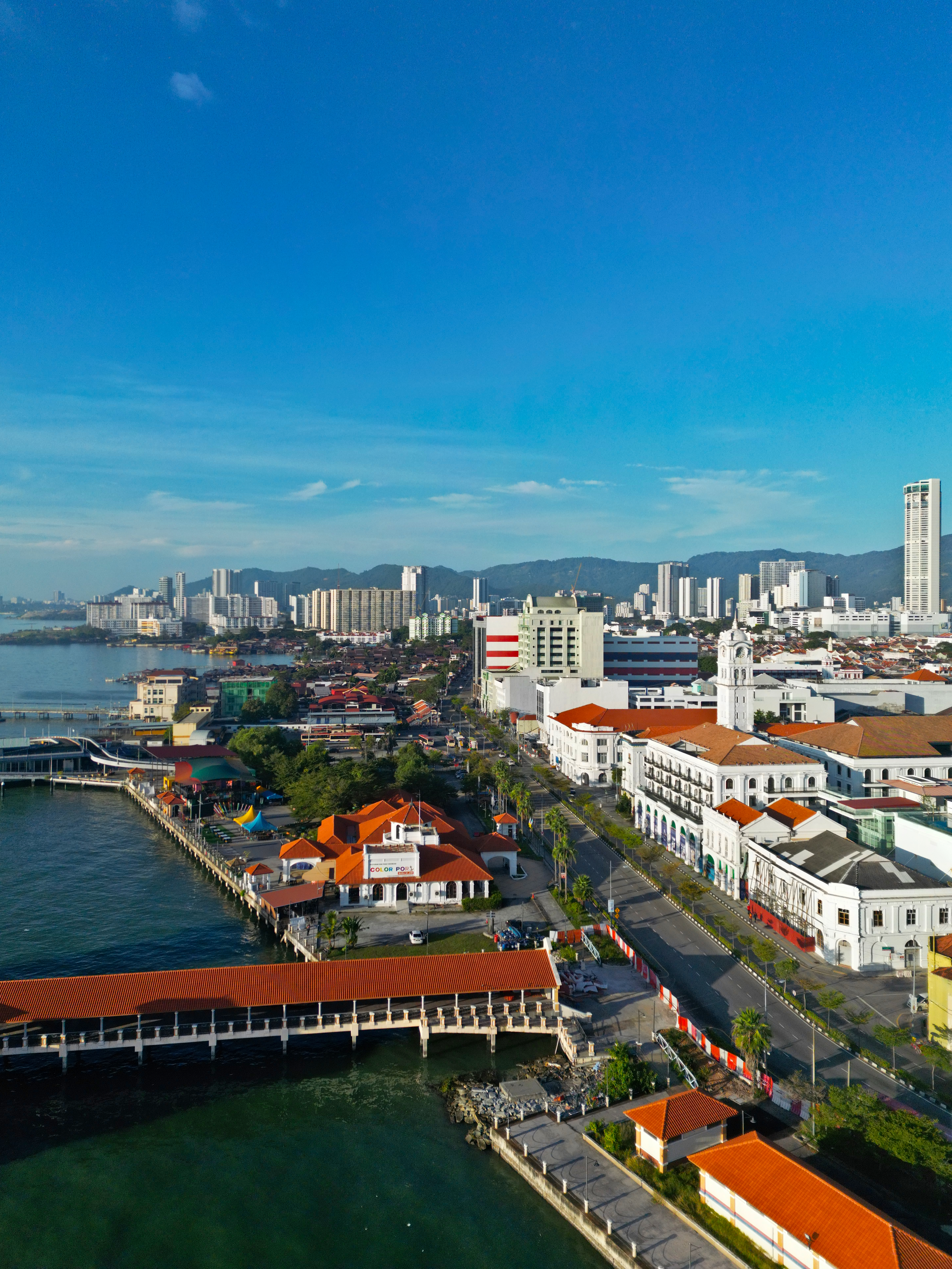
- Interactive map of Weld Quay
- Native name: Malay: Pengkalan Weld; Chinese: 海墘; Tamil: கிடங்கு தெரு
- Maintained by: Penang Island City Council
- Location: George Town
- Coordinates: 5.415780°N 100.34354°E
- North end: King Edward Place
- South end: Tun Dr Lim Chong Eu Expressway

Construction
- Inauguration: Mid-1880s
- PENGKALAN WELD Weld Quay10300 P. PINANG

UNESCO World Heritage Site
- Type: Cultural
- Criteria: ii, iii, iv
- Designated: 2008 (32nd session)
- Part of: George Town UNESCO Core and Buffer Zones
- Reference no.: 1223
- Region: Asia-Pacific

Weld Quay is a coastal road in the city of George Town within the Malaysian state of Penang. One of a handful of places worldwide that was named after a Prime Minister of New Zealand, the road runs along the city's eastern shoreline, connecting the Tun Dr. Lim Chong Eu Expressway with Light Street and Beach Street.

Weld Quay was created as part of a massive land reclamation project in George Town in the late 19th century, which pushed the coastline further east. During the heyday of British rule, Weld Quay was home to the Port of Penang, which was then one of the major ports in Malaya. The Chinese Clan Jetties at the road was originally built to house the Chinese labourers employed at the harbour.

Now part of the city's UNESCO World Heritage Site, major transportation hubs are still located along Weld Quay today, such as Swettenham Pier and the Raja Tun Uda Ferry Terminal, the latter being used for the cross-strait Rapid Ferry services. A public bus terminal adjacent to the ferry terminal allows ferry passengers to board Rapid Penang buses to various parts of the city.

== Etymology ==
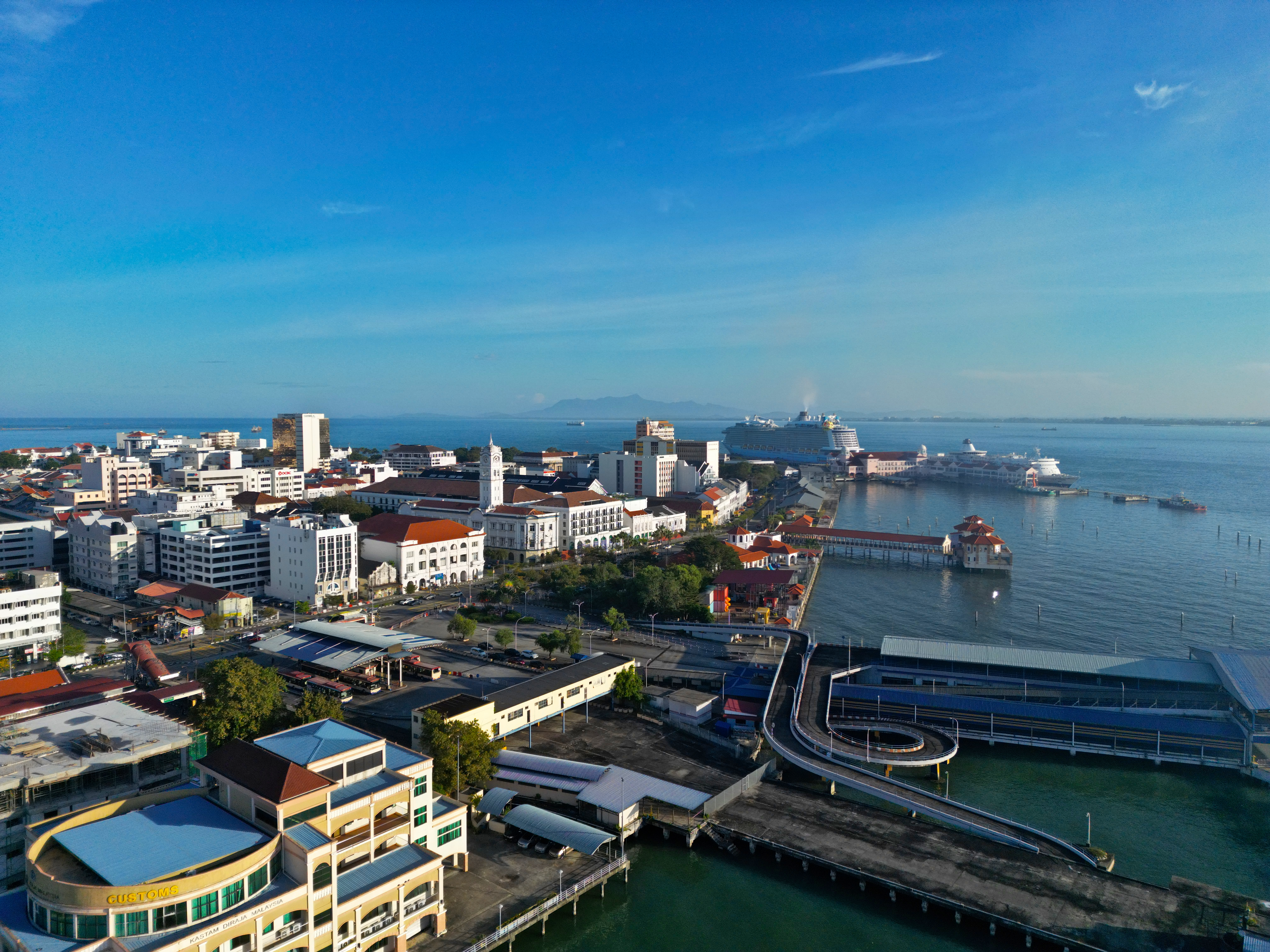
Aerial view of Weld Quay, facing north towards Swettenham Pier

Weld Quay was named after Frederick Weld, who became the Prime Minister of New Zealand in 1864. He also served as the Governor of the Straits Settlements between 1880 and 1887. During his tenure as the Governor, a large-scale land reclamation project was carried out in George Town in order to extend the city's eastern shoreline and create more land for the Port of Penang.

In Tamil, this place is known as Kitangu Street (கிடங்கு தெரு). Kitangu Street is translated as 'street of warehouses'. As it was a major port during the British period, many warehouses were located in this place

== History ==
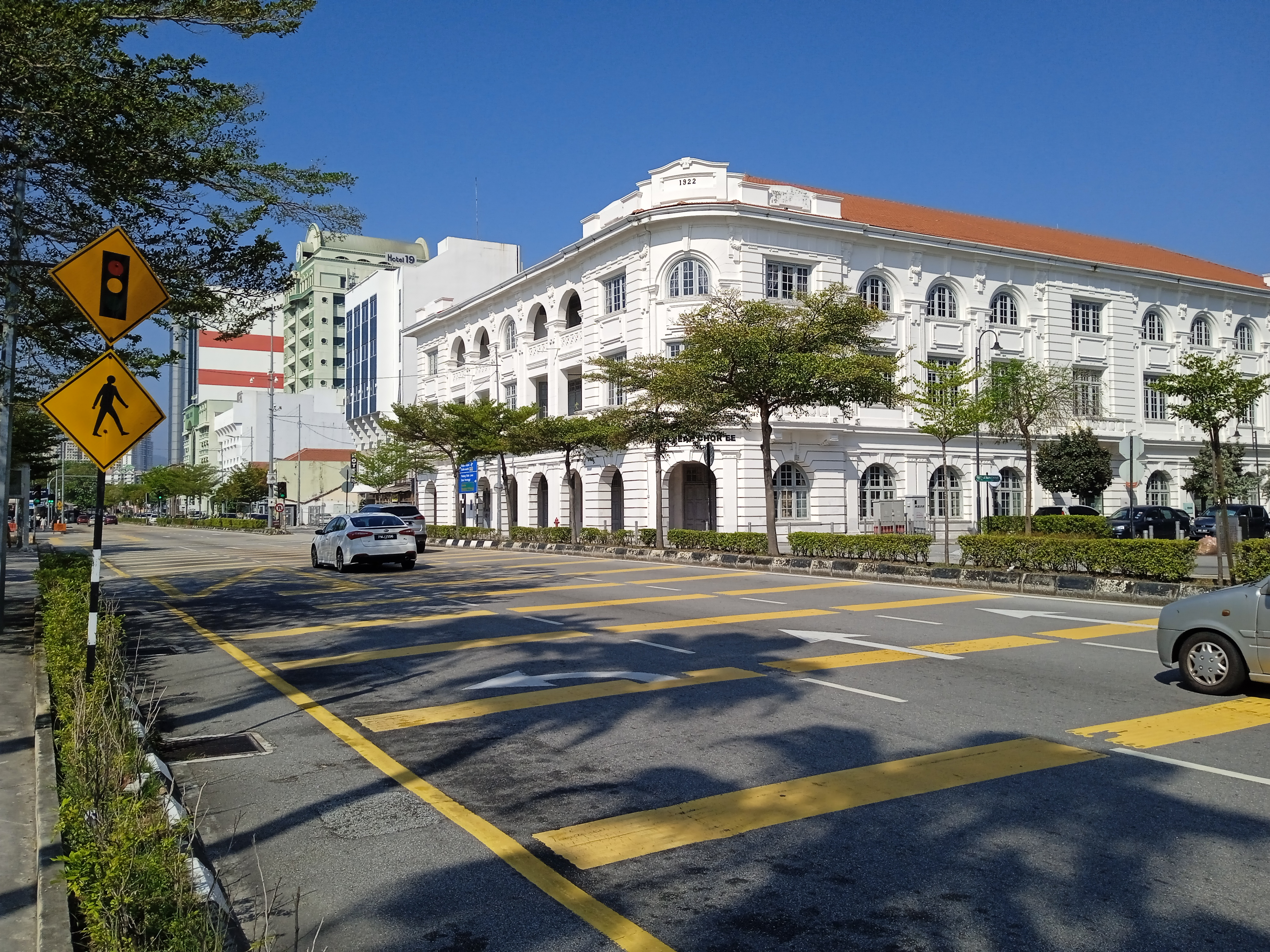
Wisma Yeap Chor Ee, one of the colonial buildings that line Weld Quay.

Weld Quay was laid out during the land reclamation project between 1883 and 1889 that was carried out to provide more land for harbour activities. Prior to the land reclamation, the sea had reached right up to Beach Street.

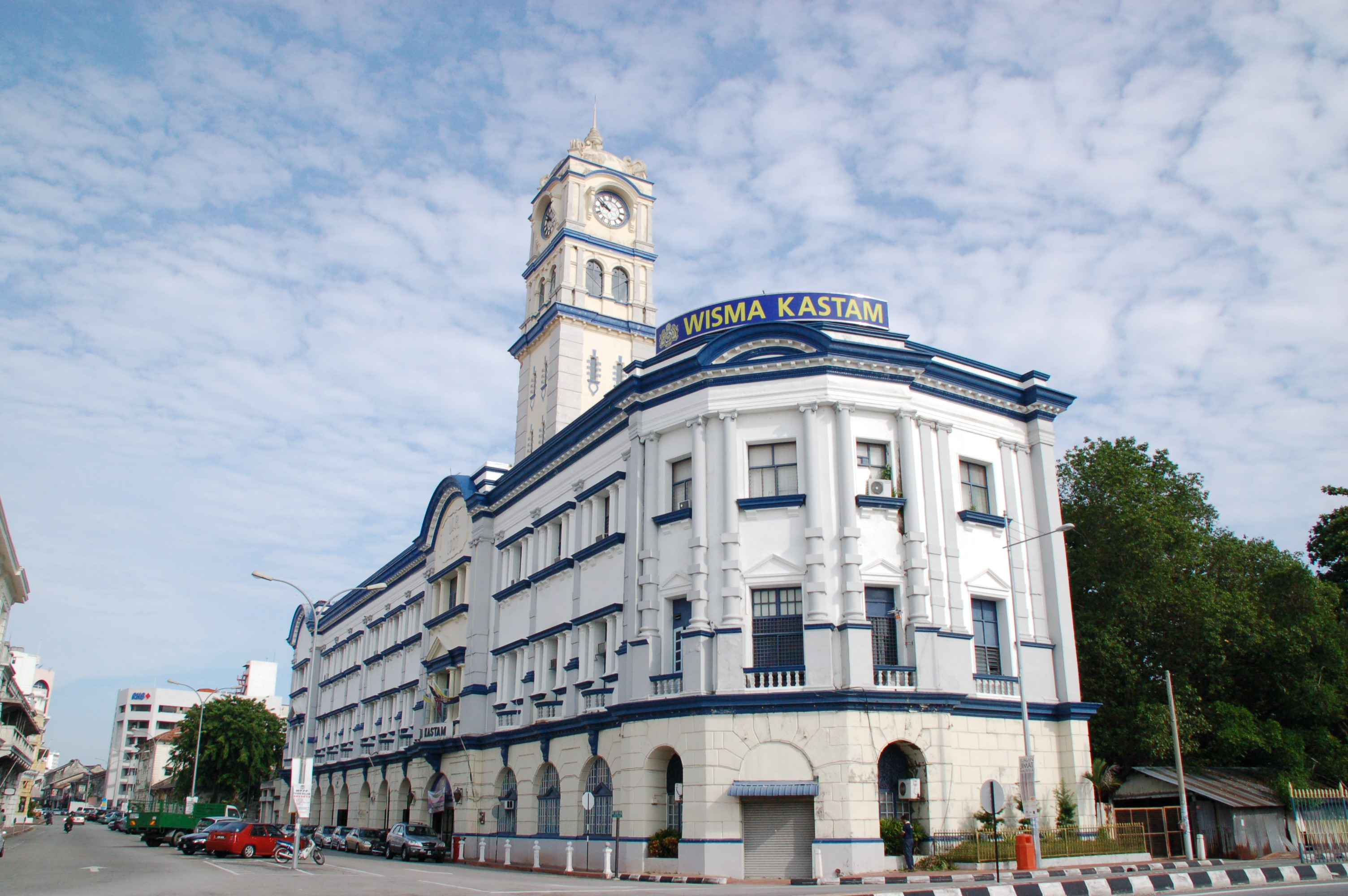
The old Malayan Railway Building at Weld Quay, now Wisma Kastam

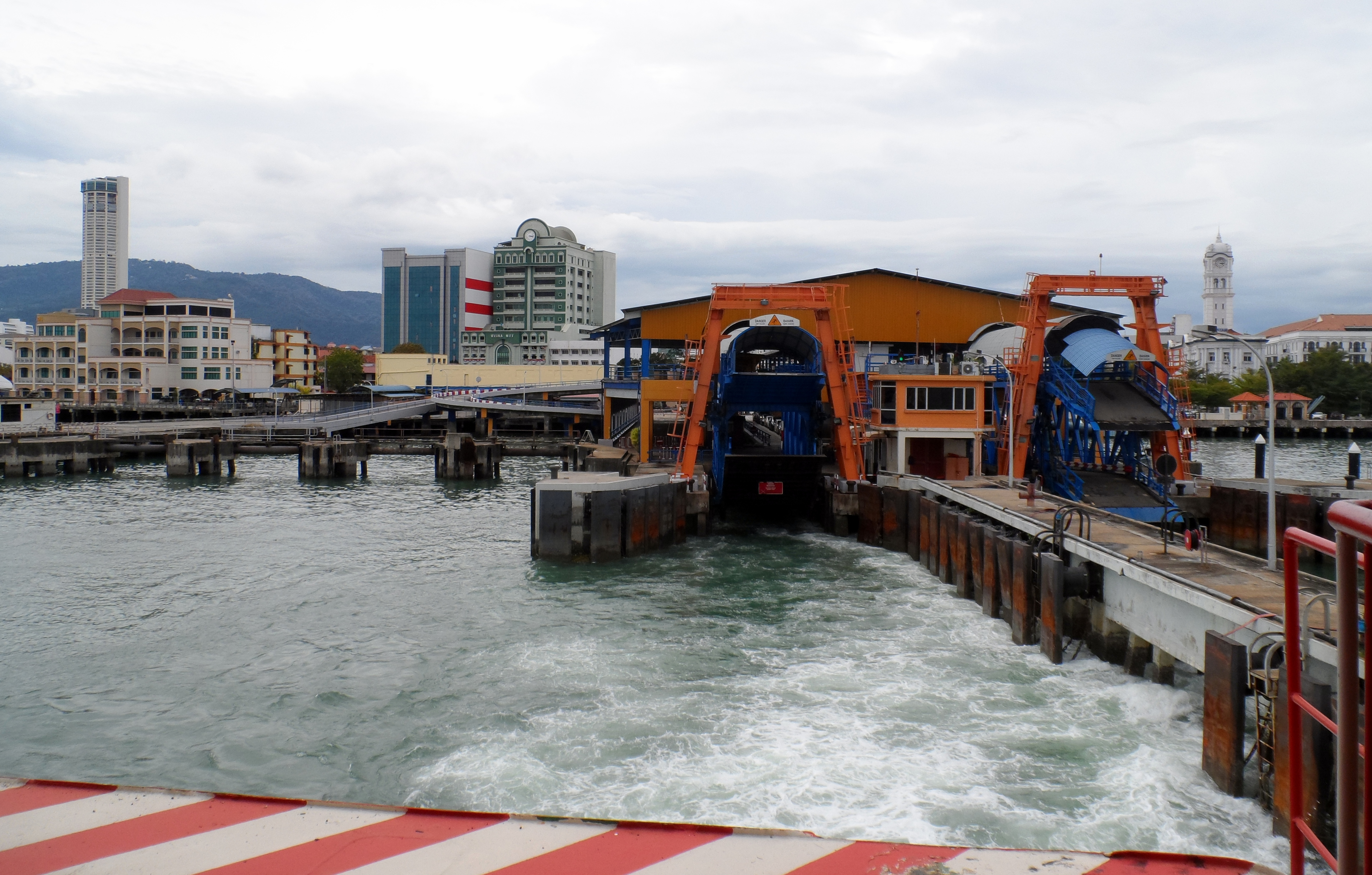
Raja Tun Uda Ferry Terminal

Subsequently, a number of piers, as well as warehouses, were built along Weld Quay to facilitate harbour trade. Notably, Swettenham Pier, Penang's first deep wharf, was completed in 1904 and now serves cruise ships berthing at the city. The old railway building still stands to this day as the most imposing colonial building along Weld Quay; it was built in the 1900s to allow train passengers from Penang Island to purchase their tickets before boarding one of the cross-strait ferries to Butterworth, where the train station is located.

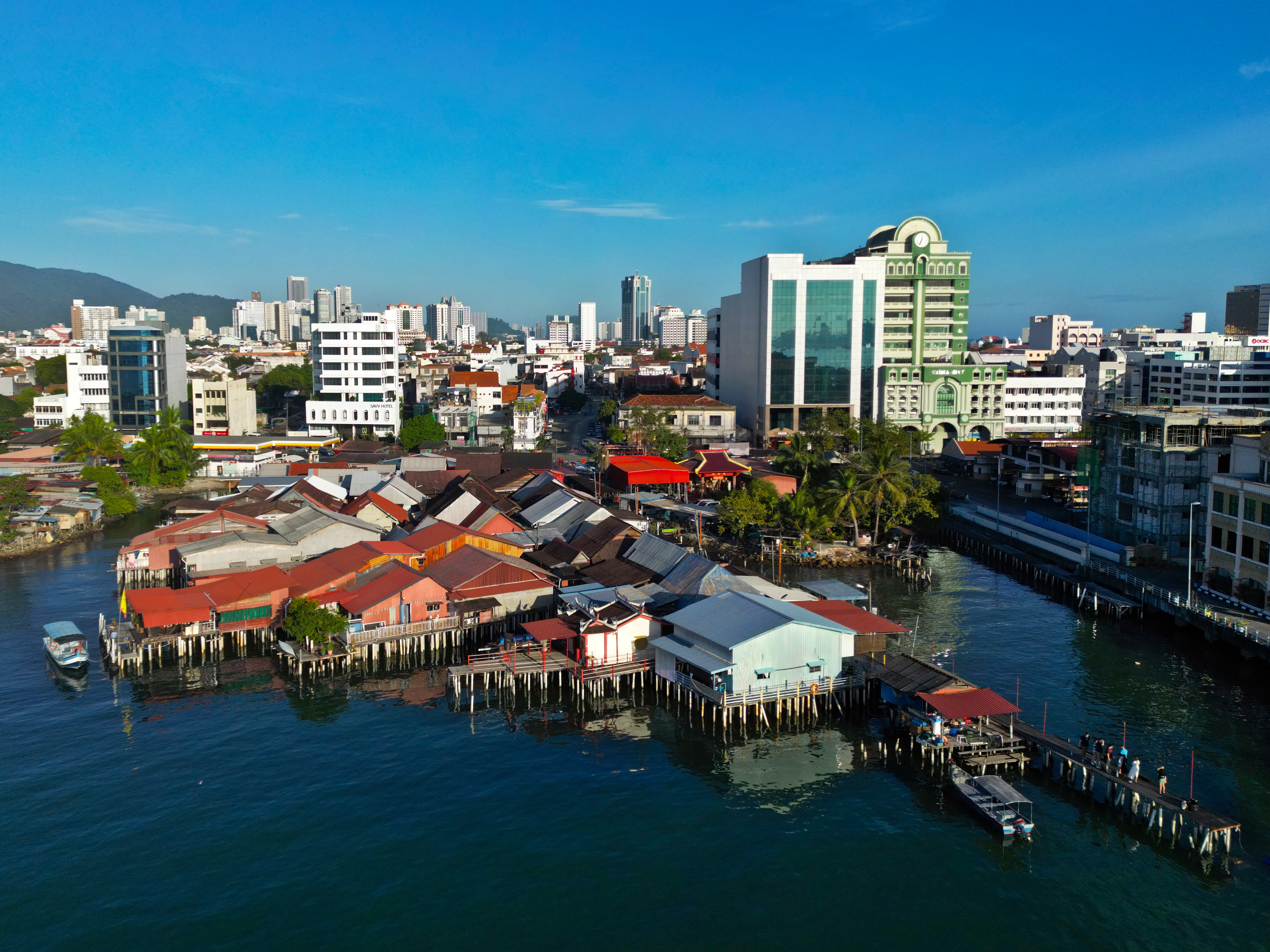
The Clan Jetties at Weld Quay

Meanwhile, Chinese coolies working at the harbour also built clan-based seaside settlements at the southern section of Weld Quay. Now known as the Clan Jetties, the wooden piers built by the Chinese were divided between the different surname-based clans, such as Lee, Yeoh and, the most famous of all, Chew. The Chew Jetty has become one of the focal points of the Chinese New Year celebrations in Penang in recent years.

In the olden days, the development of the Port of Penang into one of the most important entrepôts in British Malaya made Weld Quay one of the more bustling areas in George Town. Cruise ships and coastal steamers either docked at Swettenham Pier or anchored in the Penang Strait, while lighters and merchant vessels loaded and unloaded their cargo at Victoria Jetty. Human passengers boarded the cross-strait ferries at the FMSR Jetty (now Raja Tun Uda Ferry Terminal), while cars embarked from Church Street Pier. Mercantile firms and traders, including Yeap Chor Ee, also sited their offices within the elegant colonial buildings along Weld Quay.

Today, only the Raja Tun Uda Ferry Terminal and Swettenham Pier remain in use, with the latter becoming one of the main entry points for tourists into Penang.

== Landmarks ==
- Swettenham Pier
- Raja Tun Uda Ferry Terminal
- Federated Malay States Railways Building (currently Wisma Kastam)
- Wisma Yeap Chor Ee
- Clan Jetties

== See also ==
- List of roads in George Town
- Architecture of Penang
