= Pulau Pinang (ship) =

Museum ship in Penang, Malaysia

Coordinates: 5°24′52.7″N 100°20′36.5″E

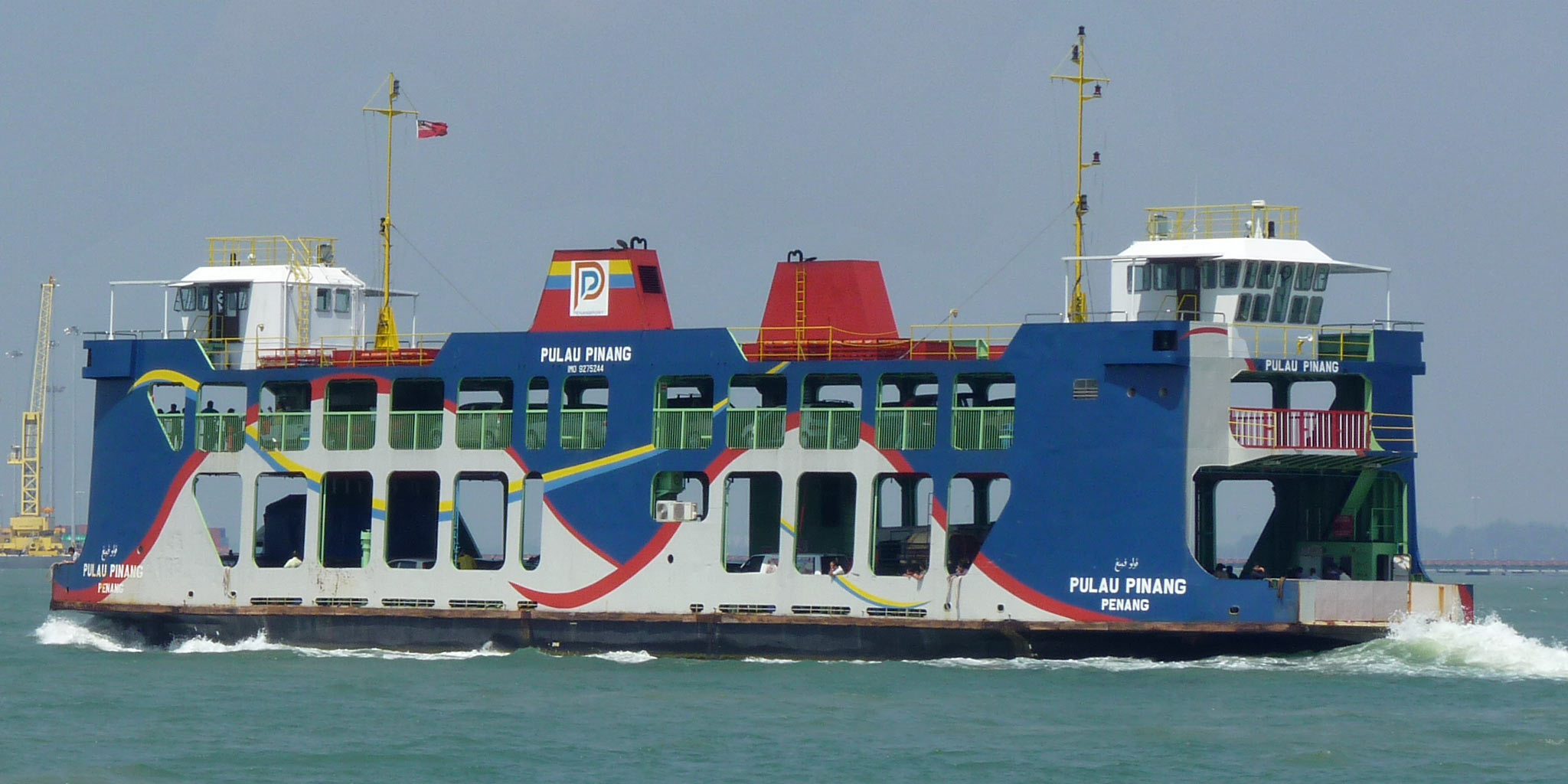
- Underway while in service, 2011

History

Malaysia
- Name: Pulau Pinang
- Namesake: Penang
- Operator: Penang Port Sdn Bhd, Rapid Ferry Sdn Bhd, Printhero Merchandise (M) Sdn Bhd
- Route: Raja Tun Uda Ferry Terminal, George Town – Sultan Abdul Halim Ferry Terminal, Butterworth
- Builder: PSC-Naval Dockyard, Lumut
- In service: 2002
- Out of service: 2019
- Identification: IMO number: 9275244
- Status: preserved as a museum ship

General characteristics
- Class & type: Pinang-class RORO ferry
- Tonnage: 486 GT ; 146 NT
- Length: 56 m (184 ft)
- Beam: 11.61 m (38 ft 1 in)
- Height: main deck to upper deck: 4.88 m (16.0 ft); upper deck to bridge deck: 2.6 m (8 ft 6 in)
- Draught: 1.83 m (6.0 ft)
- Depth: 3.71 m (12 ft 2 in)
- Decks: 4
- Installed power: 1,664 kW (2,231 shp)
- Propulsion: 2 x Wärtsilä 6L20 diesel engine; 2 x Voith Schneider Propeller
- Speed: 11.5 knots (21 km/h; 13 mph)

Pulau Pinang is a retired Pinang-class RORO ferry that was in the Penang ferry service. She was the last double-decker passenger-vehicle vessel to enter the service.

She is now permanently moored at Tanjong City Marina, within George Town in the Malaysian state of Penang as a museum ship, housing the Penang Ferry Museum.

== Design ==
Two Pinang-class ferries, Pulau Pinang and Pulau Payar were built by PSC-Naval Dockyard in Lumut, Perak for the Penang ferry service. Pulau Pinang is the second ferry of the service named in honour of the state. Pulau Pinang is 56 metres long, 11.61 metres wide and displaces 486 gross tons. She has four decks: Navigation deck, upper deck, main deck and engine room.

The navigation deck is the topmost deck. It has a wheelhouse each on the fore and aft of the deck, with a funnel on each side of the deck's port and starboard side. Buoyant apparatuses and lifebuoys are also stored in this deck.

The aft wheelhouse

Buoyant apparatuses on the navigation deck

The upper deck and main deck were passenger areas. The upper deck carried a mix of pedestrians and vehicles, while the main deck only carried vehicles. The passenger areas could be entered and exited through gates fixed at each deck's fore and aft ends. Both decks were fitted with life jackets, with only the main deck fitted with lifebuoys. The engine room is inside the hull, housing the ferry's machinery, control room and store rooms.

One of the Wärtsilä 6L20 engines

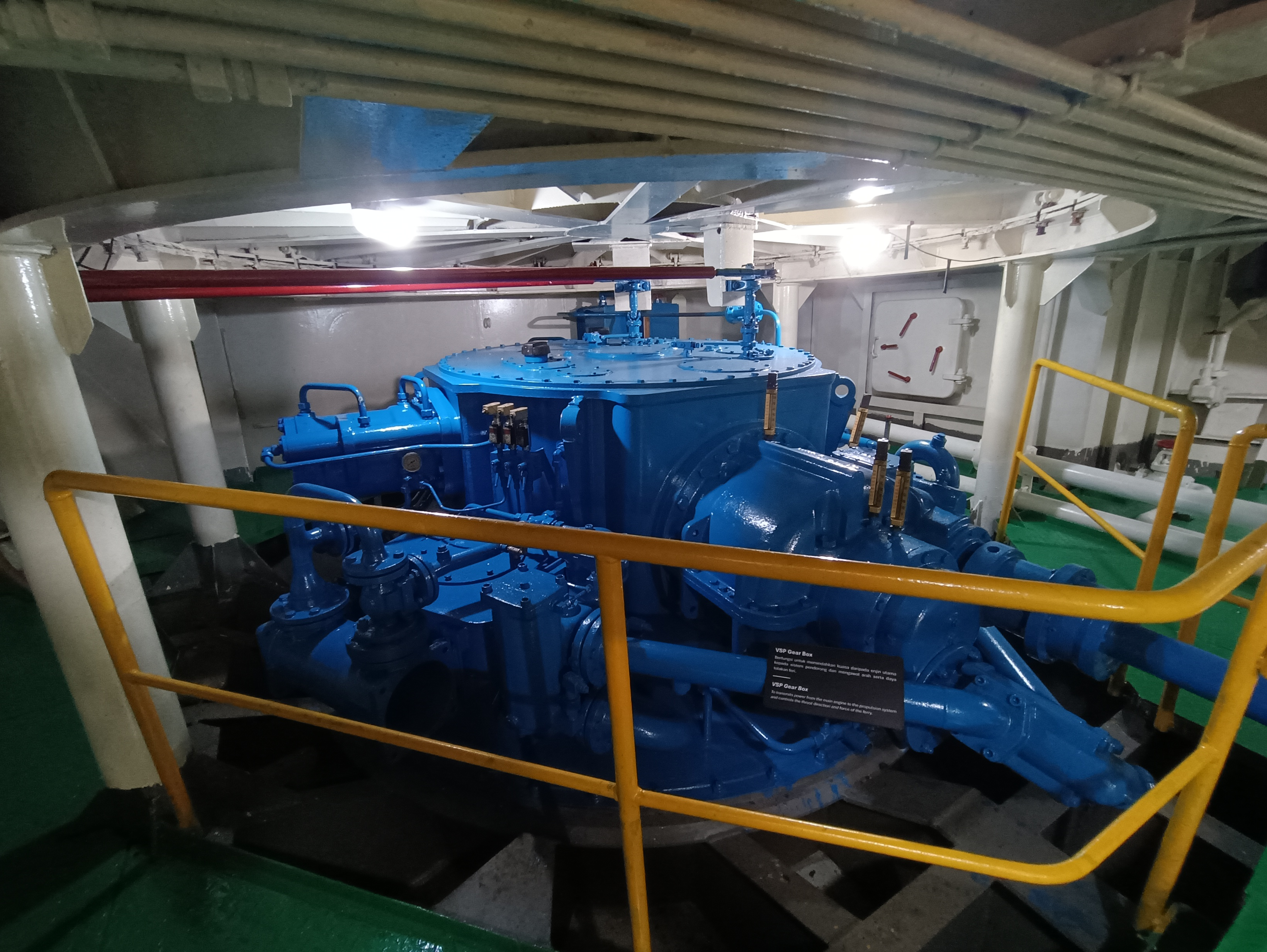
Gearbox of Schneider Propeller

Pulau Pinang was propelled by a pair of Voith Schneider Propellers, with one positioned at her fore and the other at her aft. Each of them were driven by a separate Wärtsilä 6L20 diesel engine. The engines provided 1,664 kilowatts of power, which were able to push her speed to 11.5 knots. During her service life she sported two paint schemes – a red, white and blue combo in the late 2000s and thereafter, green and white with sketches of Penang's landmarks.

== Ferry service ==
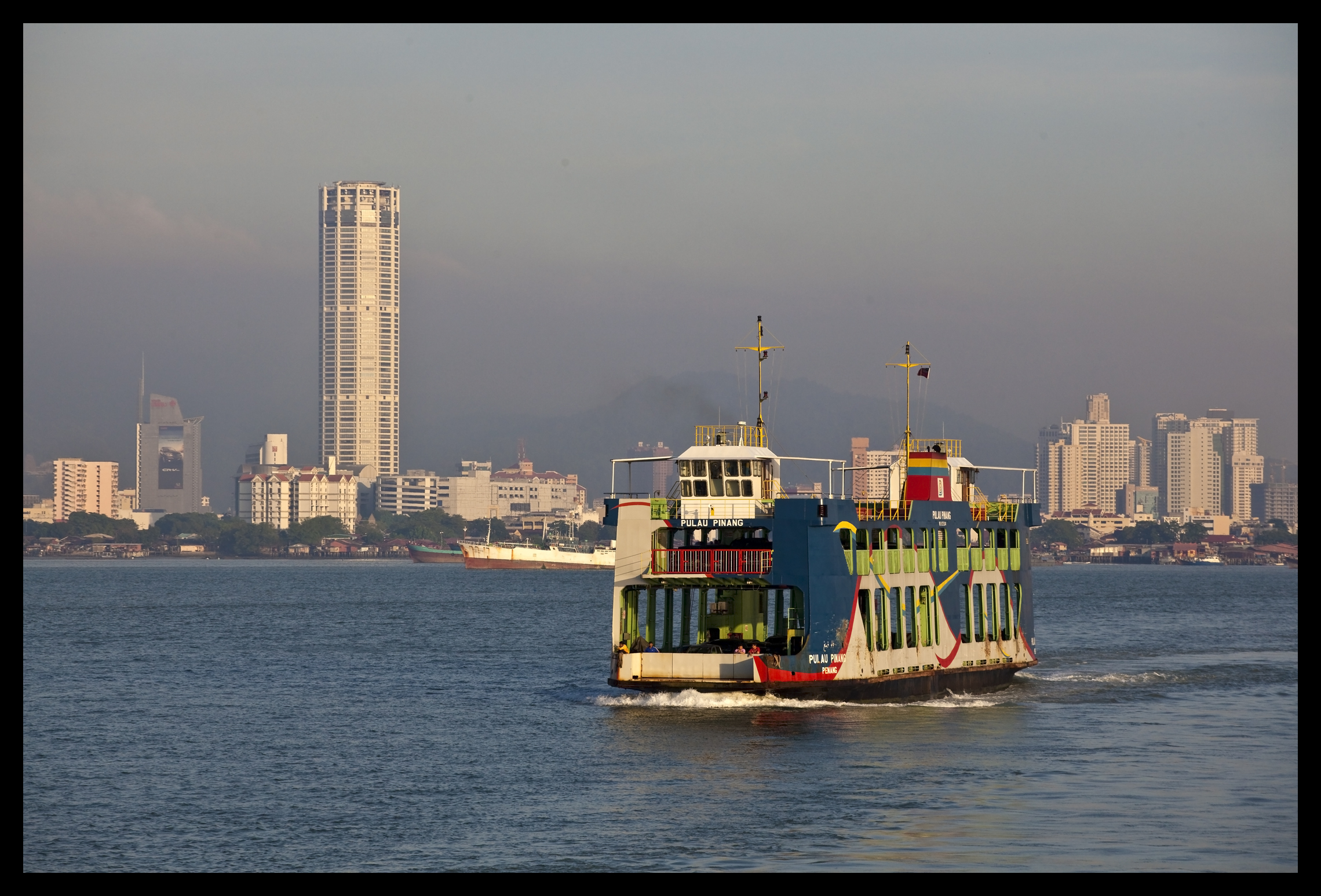
Underway from George Town in 2010

Pulau Pinang, along with her sister ship Pulau Payar, were put into service in 2002 for the Penang ferry service operated by Penang Port Sdn Bhd to replace older ferries. In May 2018 her operation was transferred to Rapid Ferry Sdn Bhd as the service was acquired by Prasarana Malaysia.

Due to persistent engine trouble, costly repairs and a lack of parts, Pulau Pinang was taken out of service by November 2019. She, together with the entire old ferry fleet, was retired at the end of 2020.

== Penang Ferry Museum ==
Penang Ferry Museum
- Pulau Pinang berthed at Tanjong City Marina, 2026
- Established: 2025
- Location: Tanjong City Marina, George Town, Penang
- Type: Maritime museum
- Website: penangferrymuseum.com

=== Preservation ===
Pulau Pinang was planned to be converted into a museum ship after retirement, and thus was laid up near the Bagan Dalam slipway, waiting for a successful bidder. During the finalisation of her leasing process, she was found partially sunken in June 2021, sparking public outcry on social media. It was found that her sinking was caused by water seeping in from leaks in her engine room. Efforts were made to pump out the water so that repairs could be commenced.

Printhero Merchandise (M) Sdn Bhd won the tender and was granted a 10-year lease to restore and manage Pulau Pinang. With conversion works about 80% complete, she was towed to Swettenham Pier Cruise Terminal by October 2024. A few days after docking at the terminal she sprang a leak and started listing heavily. She was quickly beached in shallower waters to avert more serious outcomes. After two weeks of extensive repairs, she was finally refloated, before being moved to her permanent berthing place at Tanjong City Marina where she was attached to dolphins which guide her during the rise and fall of the tide.

As the Penang Ferry Museum, Pulau Pinang sports the iconic yellow livery donned by the old ferry fleet of the service. Her exterior is also painted with characters of artist Azmi Hussin. Her open-air Upper Deck and Main Deck are refitted into air-conditioned exhibits.

=== Interpretation ===
The Penang Ferry Museum had a limited opening on 30 August 2025 and a soft opening on Malaysia Day the same year. She was then officially opened to the public on 12 January 2026. All four decks of the ferry has been made accessible to the public.

==== Main deck ====
The museum is entered through the main deck via a pier side gangway. From the entrance a photo tunnel leads into the History Gallery, which traces a chronological timeline of the Penang port and ferry service. The gallery also documents the Sultan Abdul Halim ferry terminal bridge collapse as a miniature diorama. Next is the Replica Gallery, featuring scale models of Penang's ferries since the service began in 1894. After that is the Ferry Collection, which displays salvaged artefacts from old ferries and a Voith Schneider Propeller taken out of Pulau Pinang. Then, visitors can enter the Screening Room which recreates past ferry crossings through colourised archival footage. Visitors could then access the engine room and the upper deck through the Memory Lane. The Automotive Showcase is near the exit, displaying two Morris Minor vintage cars to demonstrate how the ferries once transported vehicles.

Diorama of the Sultan Abdul Halim ferry terminal bridge collapse

Scale models of Pinang-class ferries

Artifacts from the old ferry fleet

One of the vintage cars on display

==== Upper deck ====
The upper deck contains an outdoor ferry seating area that preserved the old benches for pedestrian passengers. The indoor area includes:

- Activity Area for conducting educational programmes for school groups.
- Diorama Gallery that depicts miniature dioramas of colonial Weld Quay, the ferry service and the Penang Strait. The gallery is a work in progress as of April 2026.
- Art Gallery exhibiting artworks about the ferry service.
- Merchandise Store.

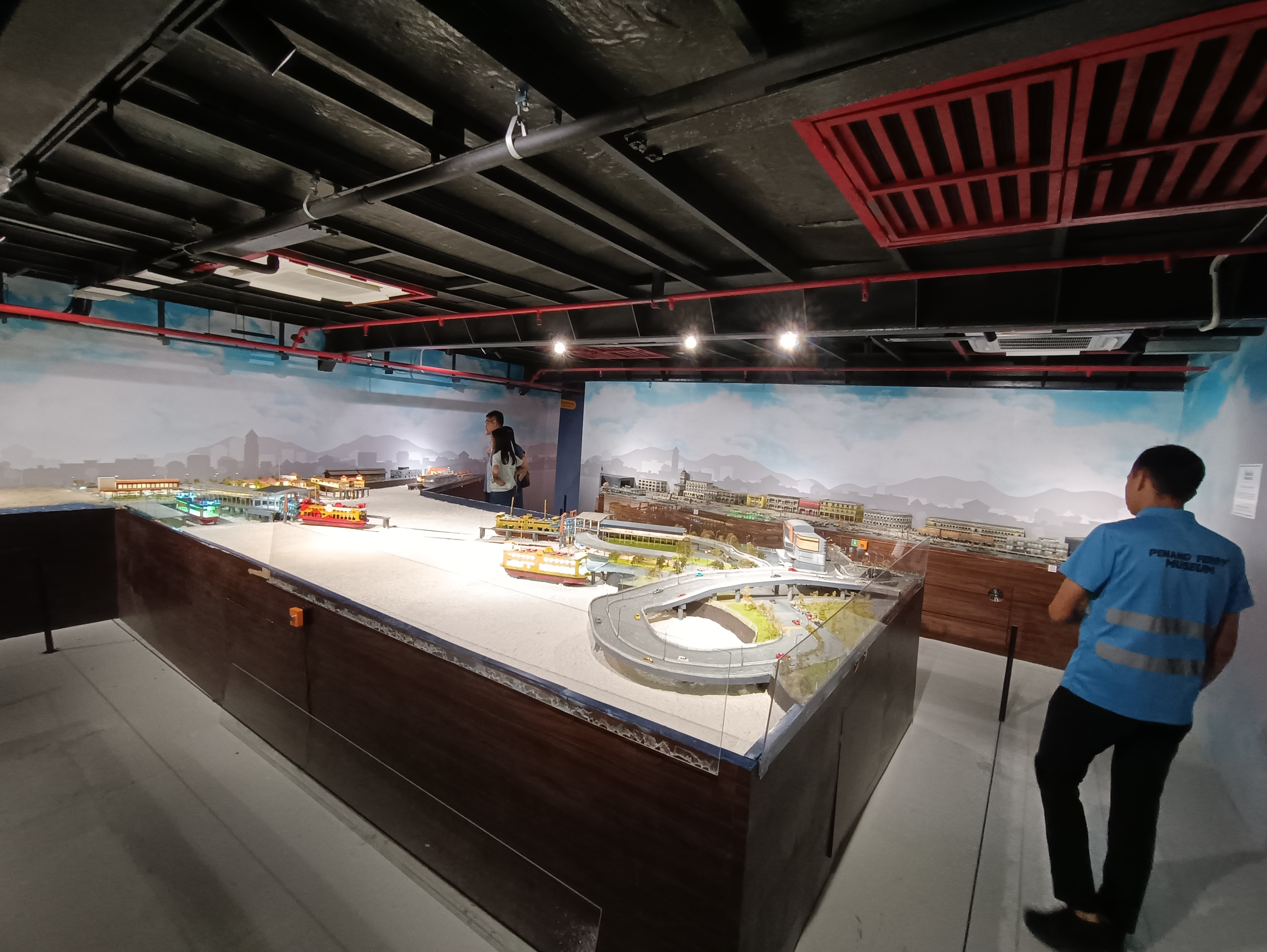
Diorama Gallery

Diorama of colonial Weld Quay

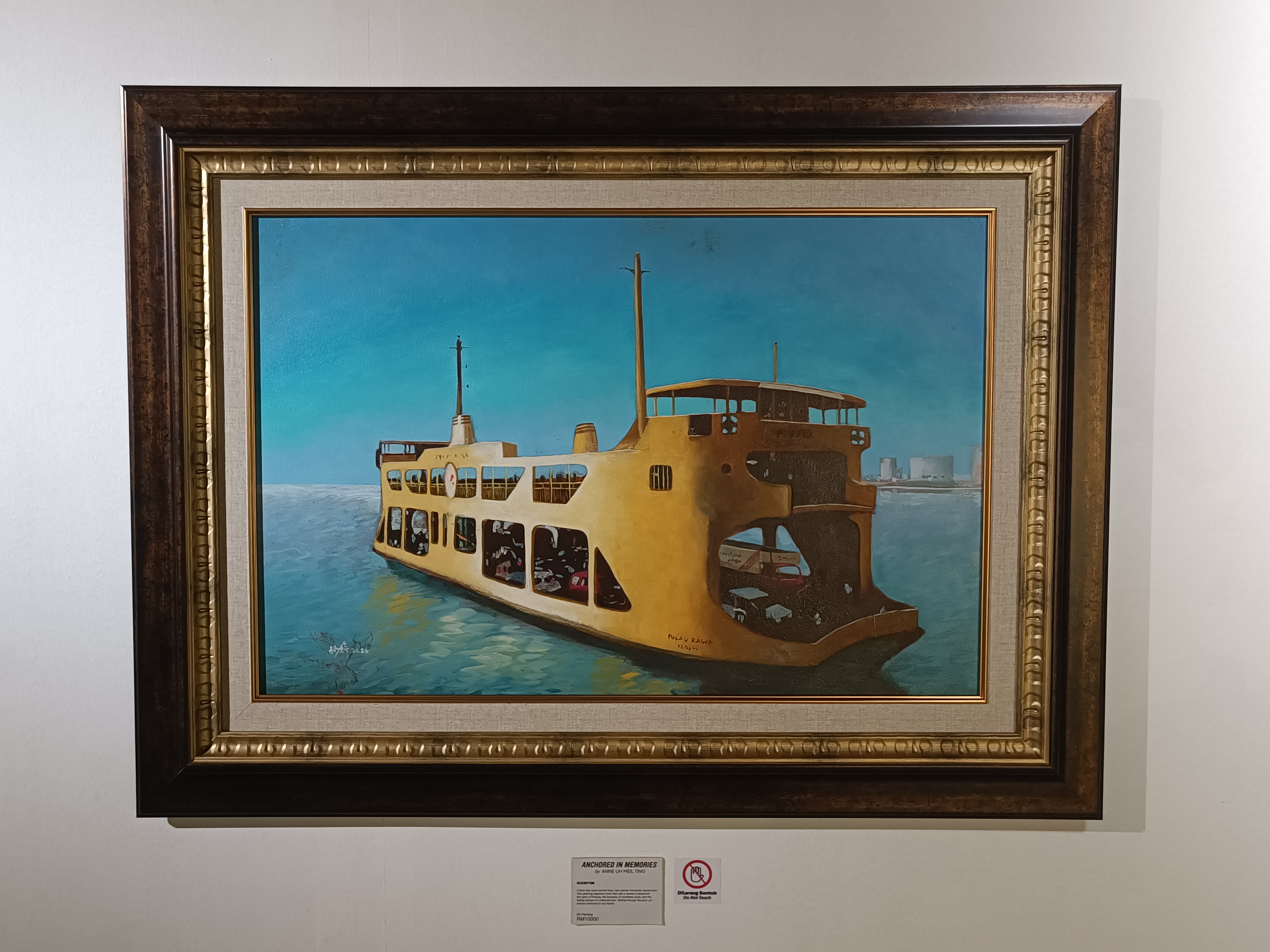
Artwork on display in the Art Gallery

==== Navigation deck ====
The navigation deck provides a panoramic view of the Penang Strait, with information boards for landmarks. The wheelhouses on the deck can be entered by the public. A cafe is planned for this area.

Information board for landmarks

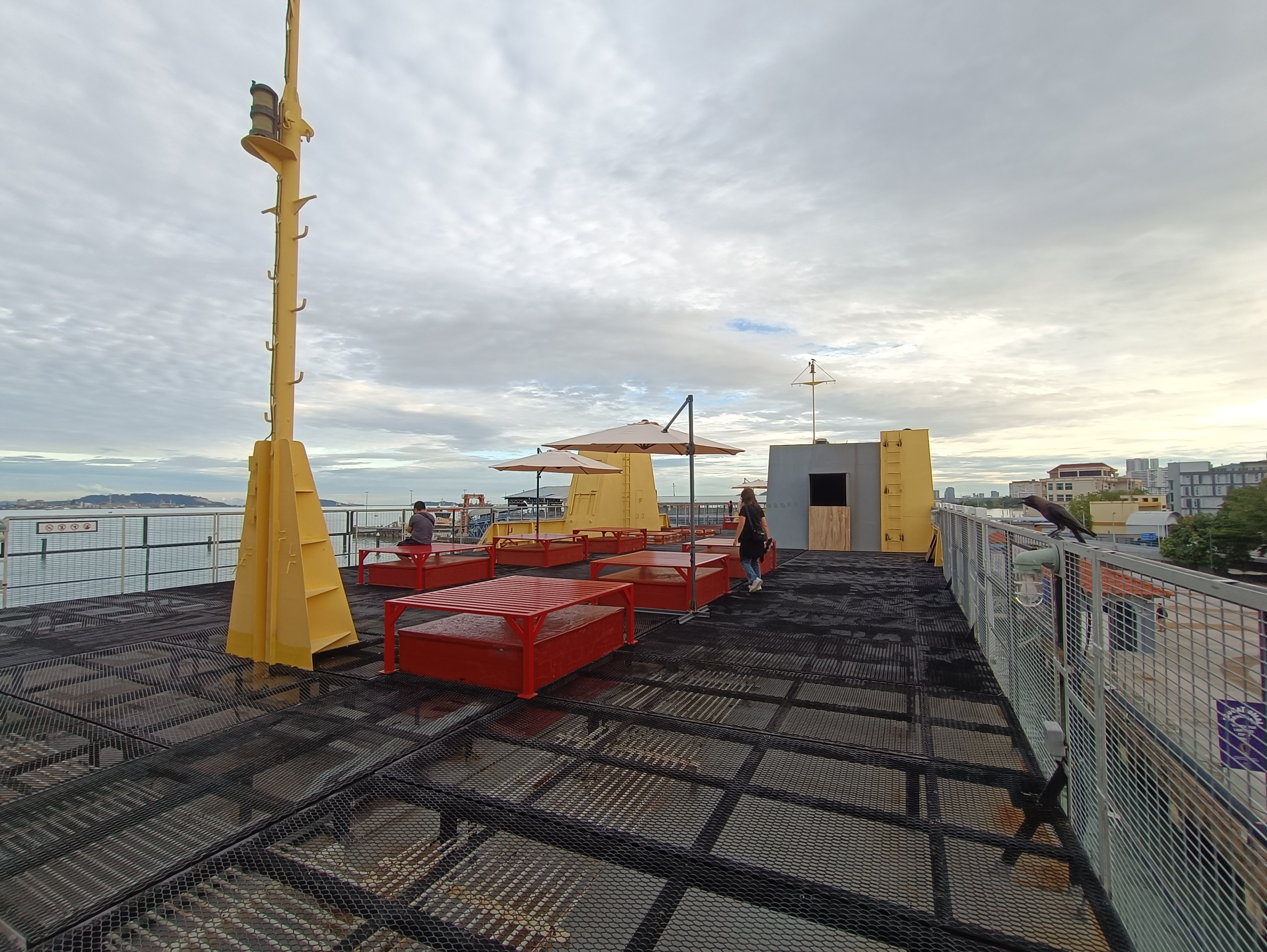
Navigation deck

Inside the aft wheelhouse

==== Engine room ====
In the engine room, visitors can view the ferry's diesel engines, control room, and other machinery, along with a virtual reality experience. An extra VIP ticket must be purchased to enter the engine room.

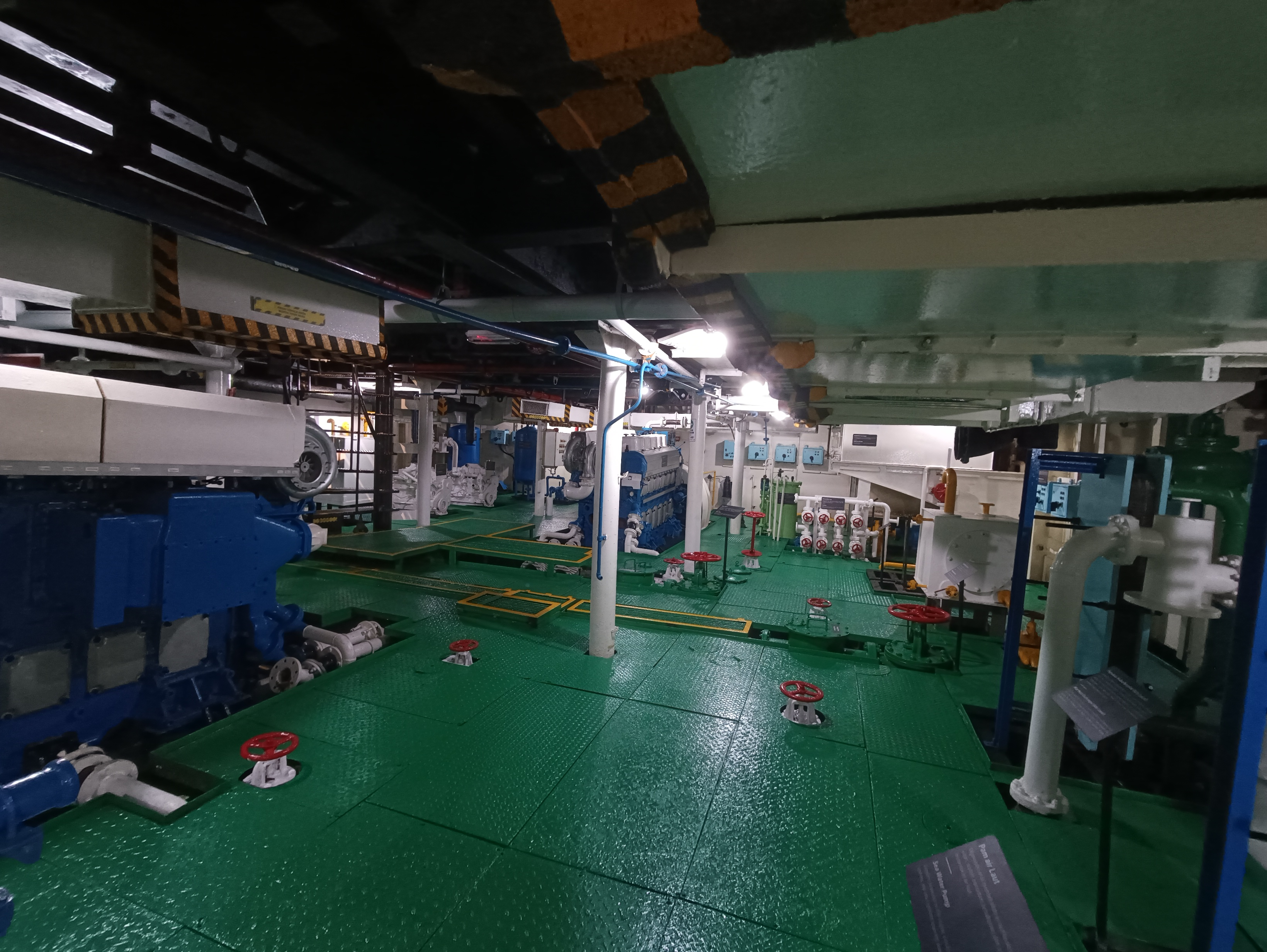
Engine room

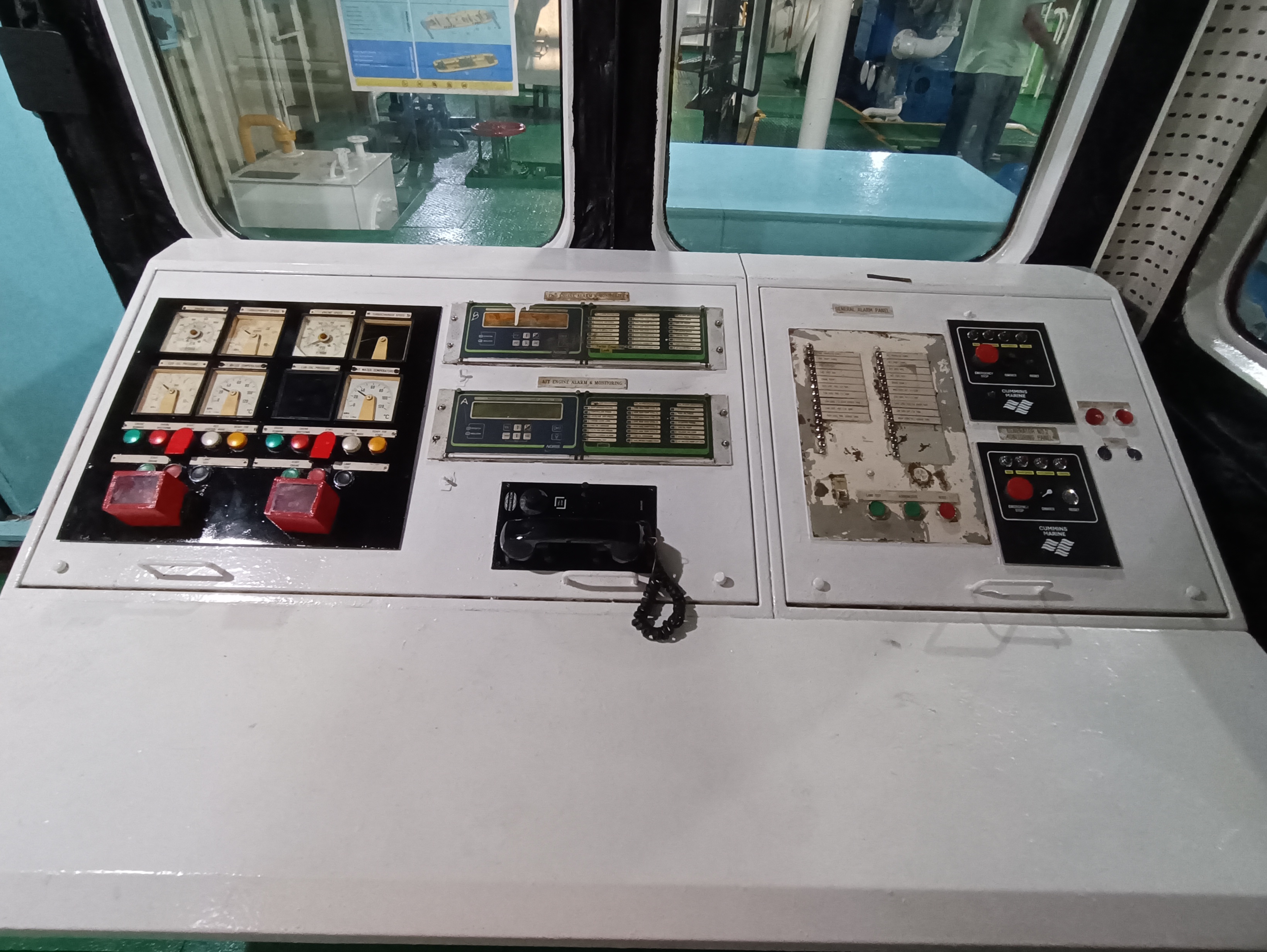
Inside the control room

== Gallery ==
Tour map

Diagrams of the old ferry fleet

Fire control plan

Instructions for the helmsman

Navigation mast

Information on emergency sound signals

One of the dolphins attached to the ferry

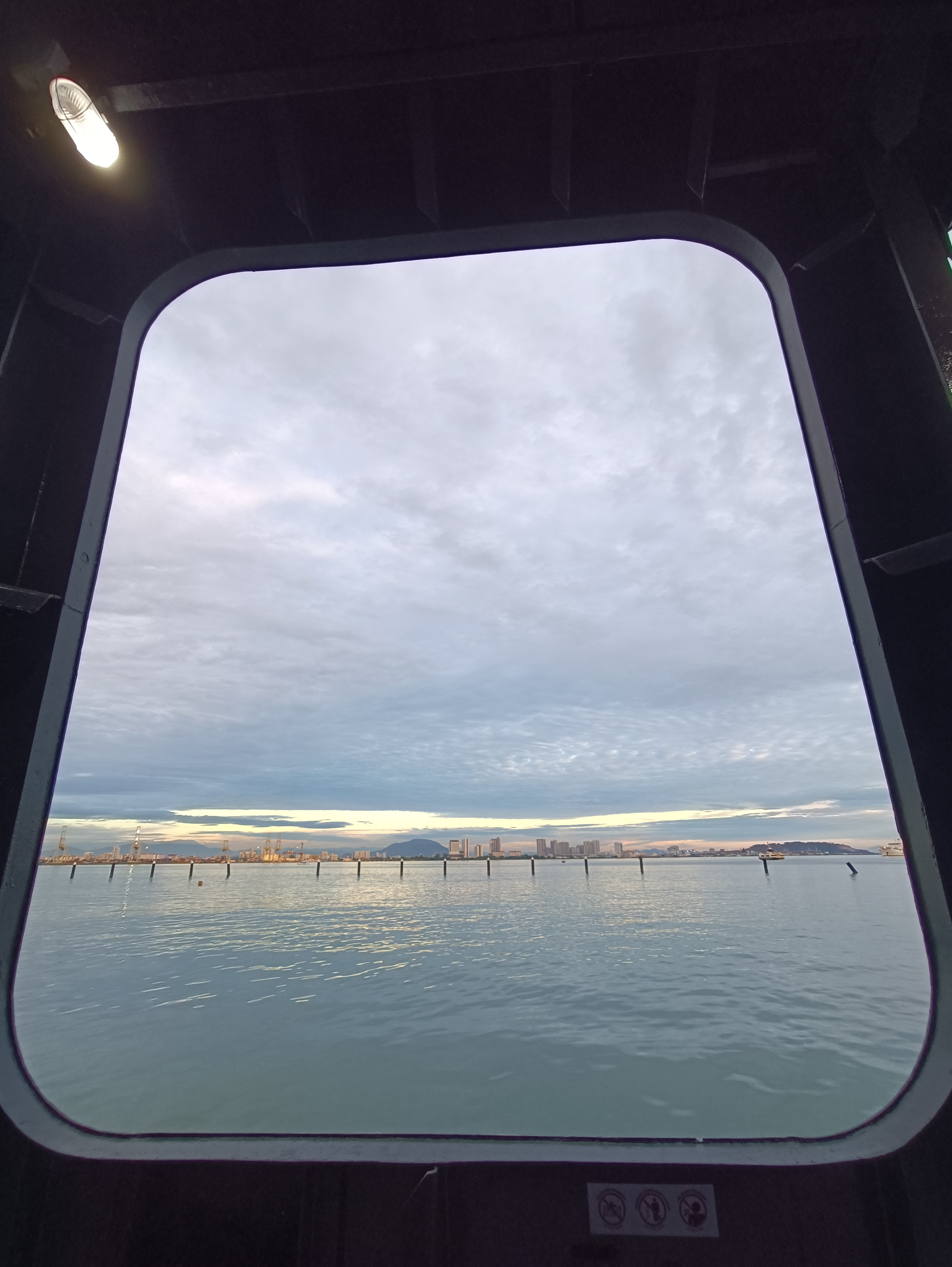
View out of a window of the ferry

== See also ==
- List of tourist attractions in Penang
- List of museums in Malaysia
- List of museum ships
