= Penang (disambiguation) =

Penang is a state in Peninsular Malaysia.

Penang may also refer to:

== Places ==
- Penang Island, the main constituent island of Penang

== Others ==
- Penang FA, a football club based in George Town, Penang, Malaysia
- Penang (restaurant chain)
- Penang Hokkien, a dialect of Hokkien spoken in the district of Penang, Malaysia
- Pulau Pinang, a ferry named after the state.

== See also ==
- Pinang (disambiguation)
