= MV Empire Day =

World War II merchant ship of the United Kingdom

History
- Name: Empire Day
- Owner: Ministry of War Transport
- Operator: Stephens Sutton Ltd (1941– ); Lyle Shipping Co Ltd ( –1944)
- Port of registry: Sunderland, United Kingdom
- Builder: William Doxford & Sons Ltd
- Yard number: 673
- Launched: 27 March 1941
- Completed: July 1941
- Out of service: 7 August 1944
- Identification: United Kingdom Official Number 168914; Code Letters BCMG
- Fate: Torpedoed and sunk, 7 August 1944

General characteristics
- Type: CAM ship (1941–1943); Cargo ship (1943–1944)
- Tonnage: 7,242 GRT; 5,021 NRT; 10,255 DWT
- Length: 428 ft 8 in (130.66 m)
- Beam: 56 ft 5 in (17.20 m)
- Draught: 27 feet 4 3/4 inches (8.350 m)
- Depth: 35 ft 5 in (10.80 m)
- Installed power: 516 nhp
- Propulsion: 2SCSA diesel engine
- Complement: 34, plus 8 DEMS gunners
- Armament: 1 Hawker Sea Hurricane (1941–1943); 1 × 4-inch gun; 1 × 12-pdr gun; 2 × 20 mm guns

Location of the attack by U-198 on Empire Day off the coast of what is now Tanzania

MV Empire Day was a 7,241 GRT cargo ship that was built in 1941 as a CAM ship by William Doxford & Sons Ltd, Sunderland, Co Durham, United Kingdom for the Ministry of War Transport (MoWT). In 1943, she was converted to a standard cargo ship. She served until August 1944 when she was torpedoed and sunk by U-198.

== Description ==
The ship was built in 1941 by William Doxford & Sons Ltd, Sunderland, Co Durham. She was yard number 673.

The ship was 428 feet 8 inches (130.66 m) long, with a beam of 56 feet 5 inches (17.20 m). She had a depth of 35 feet 5 inches (10.80 m) and a draught of 27 feet 4 3/4 inches (8.350 m). She was assessed at 7,242 gross register tons (GRT), 5,021 net register tons (NRT). Her deadweight tonnage (DWT) was 10,255.

The ship was propelled by a 516 nominal horsepower diesel engine.which had three cylinders of 23 5/8 inches (60 cm) diameter by 91 5/16 inches (231.9 cm) stroke. The engines was built by William Doxford & Sons Ltd, Sunderland.

== History ==
Empire Day was built for the MoWT as an Empire ship. Yard number 673, she was launched on 27 March 1941 and completed in July. She was initially placed under the management of Stephens Sutton Ltd. Management would later pass to Lyle Shipping Co Ltd. The United Kingdom Official Number 168914 was allocated and Code Letters BCMG were allocated. Her port of registry was Sunderland.

Built as a CAM ship, Empire Day could embark and operate a Hawker Sea Hurricane aircraft. The ship was armed with one 4-inch (100 mm) gun, one 12-pounder gun and two 20-millimetre (0.79 in) guns.

Empire Day sailed from Sunderland to the Tyne on 21 July 1941. Five days later, she joined Convoy EC 50, which had departed from Southend, Essex on 25 July and arrived at the Clyde on 28 July. Empire Day lost her anchor and chain, and did not arrive until 30 July. She departed the Clyde on 4 August and sailed to Belfast, County Antrim. On 12 August, she departed from Belfast Lough to join Convoy ON 6, which had departed from Liverpool, Lancashire the previous day and dispersed at sea on 11 August. Her destination was Halifax, Nova Scotia, Canada, where she arrived on 26 August. Loaded with a cargo of grain, she departed Halifax on 4 September as a member of Convoy HX 148, which arrived at Liverpool on 17 September.

Empire Day departed from Liverpool on 28 September as a member of Convoy ON 21, which dispersed at sea (45°05′N 52°37′W) on 14 October. Her destination was Halifax, where she arrived on 16 October. A cargo of grain was loaded and she departed from Halifax on 22 October as a member of Convoy HX 156, which arrived at Liverpool on 5 November. She departed from Liverpool in ballast on 13 November as a member of Convoy ON 36, which dispersed at sea (49°24′N 46°15′W) on 25 November. Her destination was Halifax, where she arrived on 28 November. Loaded with grain, she departed Halifax on 8 December as a member of Convoy HX 164, which arrived at Liverpool on 23 December.

Empire Day departed from Liverpool on 23 January 1942 as a member of Convoy ON 59, which dispersed at sea (41°30′N 52°53′W) on 6 February. She was carrying the convoy's vice-commodore. Her destination was Halifax, where she arrived the next day. Laden with grain, she returned with Convoy SC 70, departing on 15 February and arriving at Liverpool on 7 March. Empire Day was carrying the convoy's commodore. She departed from Liverpool on 17 March as a member of Convoy ON 77, which dispersed at sea (43°41′N 59°12′W) on 28 March. Her destination was Halifax, arriving the next day. She returned with a cargo of grain as a member of Convoy HX 184, which departed on 8 April and arrived at Liverpool on 20 April. Empire Day was noted as carrying her Hurricane, she was first CAM ship to leave Halifax carrying her aircraft for many weeks.

Empire Day departed from Liverpool on 22 May as a member of Convoy ON 97, which arrived at Halifax on 5 June. Laden with grain, she departed from Halifax on 14 June as a member of Convoy HX 194, which arrived at Liverpool on 26 June. She left the convoy at the Belfast Lough on 25 June, to join Convoy BB 191, which departed the next day and arrived at Avonmouth, Somerset on 27 June.

Empire Day departed from Avonmouth on 6 July and arrived at the Belfast Lough two days later. On 10 July, she joined Convoy ON 111, which had departed from Liverpool that day and dispersed at sea (41°15′N 71°25′W on 24 July. Her destination was Halifax, where she was to disembark her Hurricane. She arrived that day, and departed the next day for New York, United States, where she arrived on 27 July. Empire Day departed from New York on 16 August for Cape Cod Bay, Massachusetts, from where she departed on 19 August as a member of Convoy BX 34, which arrived at Halifax on 22 August. Carrying general cargo and steel, she departed from Halifax the next day as a member of Convoy HX 204, which arrived at Liverpool on 4 September.

Empire Day departed from Liverpool on 22 October to join Convoy KMS 1G, which departed from the Clyde that day and arrived at Algiers, Algeria on 8 November. She then sailed to Gibraltar, from where she sailed on 24 November to join Convoy MKS 2, which had departed from Algiers on 21 November and arrived at Liverpool on 3 December.

Empire Day departed from Liverpool on 31 December for the Clyde, arriving the next day. She departed the Clyde on 7 January 1943 as a member of Convoy KMS 7G, which arrived at Algiers on 21 January. She left the convoy at Gibraltar on 18 January. On 26 January, she joined Convoy TE 14, which arrived at Bône, Algeria on 30 January. She left the convoy at Algiers on 29 January, departing on 11 February to join Convoy ET 11, which had departed from Bône on 9 February and arrived at Gibraltar on 13 February. She departed Gibraltar on 22 February to join Convoy MKS 8, which had departed from Bône on 17 February and arrived at Liverpool on 1 March. She left the convoy in home waters, sailing to Newport, Monmouthshire where she arrived on 1 March.

Loaded with a cargo of coal, Empire Day departed from Newport on 11 March for Milford Haven, arriving the next day and departing the day after that to join Convoy ON 173, which departed from Liverpool on 13 March and arrived at Halifax on 29 March. On 24 March, Empire Day was straggling behind the convoy. Laden with grain, she departed from Halifax on 14 April to join Convoy HX 234, which had departed from New York and arrived at Liverpool on 29 April She left the convoy at the Clyde on 28 April. Empire Day departed from the Clyde on 5 June for Milford Haven, arriving the next day and departing the day after that as a member of Convoy WP 351, which arrived at Portsmouth on 9 June. She was the only merchant ship in the convoy, and was escorted by HMS La Combatante, HMS Limbourne, HMS Plover and HMS Stevenstone. She left the convoy at Falmouth, Cornwall on 8 June.

Empire Day departed from Falmouth on 18 June and sailed to Gibraltar, arriving on 24 June. She then formed Convoy TE 23, of which she was the only ship. She arrived at Algiers on 26 June, departing on 11 July to join Convoy ET 22, which departed from Bône on 12 July and arrived at Gibraltar the next day. She departed from Gibraltar on 22 July to join Convoy GUS 10, which had departed from Bizerta, Algeria on 18 July and arrived at the Hampton Roads, Virginia, United States on 9 August. Empire Day departed sailed on to New York, from where she departed on 2 September for the Hampton Roads, where she joined Convoy UGS 17, which departed on 3 September and arrived at Port Said, Egypt on 3 October. She left the convoy at Algiers, where she arrived on 25 September. She departed from Algiers on 16 November to join Convoy GUS 21, which had departed from Port Said on 7 November and arrived at the Hampton Roads on 5 December. Her destination was New York.

Empire Day departed from New York on 2 January 1944 for the Hampton Roads, where she joined Convoy UGS 29, which arrived at Port Said on 31 January. She then sailed to Suez and Aden, arriving there on 7 February. She then joined Convoy AB 30, which departed that day and arrived at Bombay India on 15 February. She departed from Bombay on 4 March as a member of Convoy BM 88, which arrived at Madras, India on 10 March. She left the convoy at Colombo, Ceylon on 9 March. She departed from Colombo on 25 March with Convoy JC 42, arriving at Calcutta, India on 1 April and returning with Convoy CJ 24, which departed on 15 April and arrived at Colombo on 22 April. Two days later, she departed for Lourenço Marques, Mozambique, where she arrived on 8 May.

Empire Day departed from Lourenço Marques on 21 May for Durban, South Africa, where she arrived the next day. She departed three days later as a member of Convoy DKA 18, which arrived at Kilindini Harbour, Kenya on 3 June. She departed from Kilindini Harbour on 15 June with Convoy KD 5, which arrived at Durban on 24 June. She left the convoy at Lourenço Marques on 23 June. Carrying a cargo of coal bound for Adem and Port Said, she departed from Lourenço Marques on 31 July as a member of Convoy DK 21A, which dispersed off Beira, Mozambique on 2 August. On 7 August 1944, Empire Day was torpedoed and sunk by U-198 some 200 nautical miles (370 km; 230 mi) east of Dar es Salaam, Tanganyika (7°06′S 42°00′E). All 34 crew and eight DEMS gunners survived. Her chief officer was taken prisoner by U-198. He was killed when U-198 was sunk by HMS Findhorn and HMIS Godavari off the Seychelles on 12 August. He is commemorated on the Tower Hill Memorial. The survivors from Empire Day landed on Zanzibar island, which they reached on 11 August and the sinking of Empire Day was then reported. Her loss had not been realised as she was unable to send out a Mayday at the time of her sinking.
