= Sultan Abdul Halim ferry terminal bridge collapse =

1988 disaster in Butterworth, Penang, Malaysia

- View of the affected ferry terminal after the tragedy
- Date: July 31, 1988
- Time: 16:40 MYT (UTC+8)
- Location: Sultan Abdul Halim Ferry Terminal; Butterworth, Penang. Malaysia; 5.3947°N 100.3641°E
- Cause: Overloading of passengers in the waiting area of the terminal
- Deaths: 32
- Injuries: 1,634

The Sultan Abdul Halim ferry terminal bridge collapse was a disaster of the Penang Ferry Service which occurred on 31 July 1988, at the Sultan Abdul Halim Ferry Terminal in Butterworth, Penang, Malaysia. The collapse caused the deaths of 32 people and injured 1,634 people. It was blamed on overcrowding and the jetty being made out of steel bars.

Transport Minister Ling Liong Sik pledged a full and open inquiry to determine its causes, with Chief Minister Lim Chong Eu promising to help the victims through a welfare fund.

== Cause ==
=== Two simultaneous festivities ===
The cause was extreme crowding at the Sultan Abdul Halim Ferry Terminal of about 10,000 people. There were two simultaneous festivities involving the Chinese ethnic group, namely the Kwan Yin Goddess festival in George Town and the St. Anne's Church anniversary in Bukit Mertajam, Penang. The decorated float procession was held at the Esplanade and at Padang Kota [field between Dato Keramat Road and Anson Road] as well as passing through main streets of Georgetown. Statues of this goddess were paraded along streets decorated with colourful lights in the middle of the city on Sunday 31 July 1988 night. There was a call for Buddhist devotees from the Chinese ethnic group to attend the event because it was held only once every 60 years according to the Chinese calendar (a once-in-a-lifetime occasion) and this festivity was believed to bring prosperity because Kwan Yin means 'Goddess of Generosity'. Tourists from Singapore, Hong Kong and Taiwan also came at that time.

St. Anne's Church in Bukit Mertajam was also holding a large festival for its anniversary. Many Christian ethnic Chinese worshipped at this church on Sunday morning and proceeded to Penang in the afternoon to visit and observe the Buddhist ceremony.

=== Packed bridge ===
Penang Bridge which opened on 14 September 1985 did not accommodate public transport. Many people chose to go to the island to enjoy the scenic Malacca Strait and sunset, and continue to the Esplanade on foot.

=== Packed jetty ===
The Sultan Abdul Halim Ferry Terminal had two levels. The lower level was for cars and other small vehicles to roll-on/roll-off. The upper level was for passengers from and to the Butterworth bus station. The terminal, built in 1956 could not withstand the 'assault' of 10,000 passengers. Its columns were made of reinforced concrete and floor of thick boards. The floor beams, fencing and walls, made of dense steel, covered the passageway for vehicles beneath. At 4:40 p.m., the beams buckled and snapped. The floor boards consequently collapsed. The steel walls and roof caved in. The passengers above slid and were crushed by columns and platform boards. Vehicles beneath were smashed.

== Victims ==
32 people were killed and 1,674 people were injured. Victims were taken to Butterworth Hospital, Bukit Mertajam Hospital and other hospitals. The fire brigade struggled to extricate victims. The left passage was completely stopped. But the right passage could still operate, letting passengers travel to the island and back. The wreckage was left for a while for investigation and expansion planning.

This news of the ferry terminal collapse was reported on the 8:00 p.m. TV3 main news.

== Effects ==
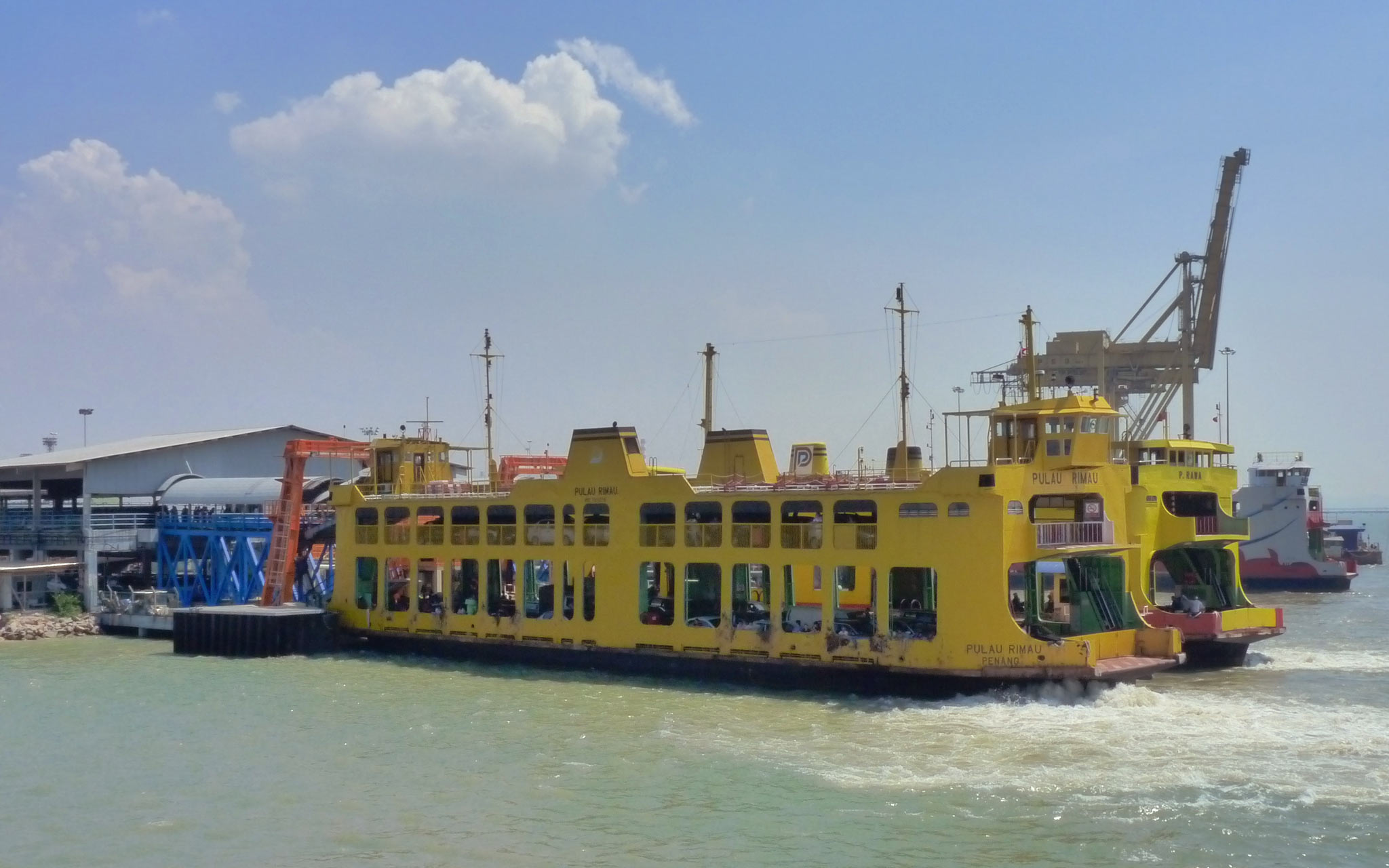
Penang ferries docked at the Butterworth ferry terminal. The collapsed section is behind the yellow ferries.

After the incident, the Penang Port Commission studied the suitability and efficiency of the use of ferries between Butterworth and Raja Tun Uda Ferry Terminal at the Penang side. Express bus passengers were dropped not only at the Butterwoth bus station but also at Sungai Dua and Gelugor. Given the relative speeds of crossing the strait by ferry versus the Penang Bridge, most regular commuters now prefer the bridge.

The Sultan Abdul Halim Ferry Terminal was rebuilt with several modifications.

== In popular culture ==
On 11 April 2015, TV3 (Malaysia)'s documentary programme "Detik Tragik" (Tragic Moments) produced an episode about the ferry terminal bridge collapse. This was followed by Fail Bomba of Radio Televisyen Malaysia (RTM) in 2017.
