= Empire Day (disambiguation) =

Empire Day may refer to:

- Empire Day
- "Empire Day" (Star Wars Rebels)
- MV Empire Day
