= James Wilfred Jefford =

Vice-Admiral James Wilfred Jefford CB CBE
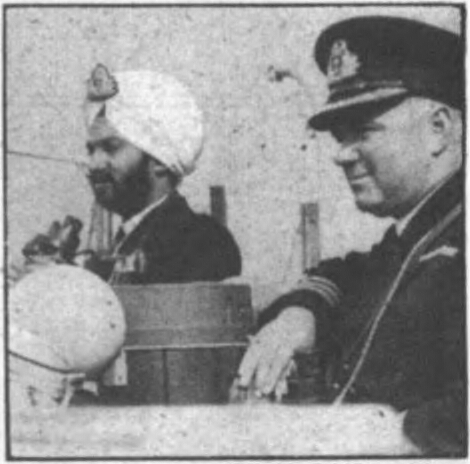
- Cdr J W Jefford, RIN, with his Navigating Officer Lt Cdr Mahindroo on aboard HMIS Godavari

Commander-in-Chief of Pakistan Navy
- In office 15 August 1947 – 30 January 1953
- Preceded by: Office established
- Succeeded by: VADM H.M.S. Choudri

Personal details
- Born: 1901
- Died: 1980 (aged 78–79)
- Citizenship: (British Raj) British India; Pakistan

Military service
- Years of service: 1922-1953
- Rank: Vice-Admiral
- Battles/wars: World War II; Indo-Pakistani War of 1947

Vice-Admiral James Wilfred Jefford CB CBE (22 March 1901 – 1 January 1980) was the first Commander-in-Chief of the Royal Pakistan Navy, serving from its inception in 1947 until 1953. Most of his early career was in the Royal Indian Navy.

Jefford served in the Royal Navy as a midshipman during the First World War and was commissioned into the Royal Indian Marine as a sub-lieutenant on 23 March 1922. He was successively promoted to lieutenant, RIM (23 March 1925) to lieutenant-commander, RIN, to acting commander, RIN, in 1940 and to substantive commander, RIN (10 January 1941)., On 10 September 1946, Jefford was promoted to captain, RIN, and to commodore, RIN the following year.

On the inception of the Dominion of Pakistan in 1947, Commodore Jefford transferred to the special list of the Royal Navy and was appointed Flag Officer commanding the new Royal Pakistan Navy with the acting rank of rear-admiral (15 August 1947). He retired from the Royal Indian Navy on 1 September 1948 with the rank of captain, but retained his acting rank of rear-admiral and his place on the special list of the Royal Navy while commanding the Royal Pakistan Navy. His title was upgraded to Commander-in-Chief in 1950, and he was promoted to substantive rear-admiral that year. He was promoted to a CBE in the 1951 New Year Honours list (from an OBE conferred in 1947). Vice-Admiral in the Royal Pakistan Navy, in 1953, the same year that his command was terminated.

He was Chairman of the Penang Harbour Board from 1955 to 1957 and also of the Penang Port Commission from 1956 to 1957, when he retired.

During the Second World War he commanded HMIS Indus and HMIS Godavari.

== Notes ==
Military offices
New title Pakistan Navy established	Commander-in-Chief, Royal Pakistan Navy; 1947 – 1953	Succeeded by HMS Choudri
