= HMS Findhorn =

1943 River-class frigate of the Royal Navy

History

United Kingdom
- Name: Findhorn
- Namesake: Findhorn
- Ordered: 6 October 1941
- Builder: Canadian Vickers
- Laid down: 25 August 1942
- Launched: 5 December 1942
- Commissioned: 25 June 1943
- Fate: Returned to US Navy on 20 March 1946

General characteristics
- Class & type: River-class frigate
- Displacement: 1,370 long tons (1,390 t); 1,830 long tons (1,860 t) (deep load)
- Length: 283 ft (86.26 m) p/p; 301.25 ft (91.82 m)o/a
- Beam: 36.5 ft (11.13 m)
- Draught: 9 ft (2.74 m); 13 ft (3.96 m) (deep load)
- Propulsion: 2 × Admiralty 3-drum boilers, 2 shafts, reciprocating vertical triple expansion, 5,500 ihp (4,100 kW)
- Speed: 20 knots (37.0 km/h)
- Range: 7,200 nautical miles (13,334 km) at 12 knots (22.2 km/h), with 440 long tons (450 t; 490 short tons) of oil
- Complement: 107
- Armament: 2 × QF 4-inch (102 mm) Mk.XIX guns, single mounts CP Mk.XXIII; up to 10 × QF 20 mm Oerlikon AA guns on twin mounts Mk.V and single mounts Mk.III; 1 × Hedgehog 24 spigot A/S projector; up to 150 depth charges

HMS Findhorn (K301) was a River-class frigate of the Royal Navy (RN). Findhorn was built in Canada for the United States Navy, however, she was loaned to the Royal Navy as part of the Lend-Lease program. She served during World War II.

Findhorn was one of 151 River-class frigates launched between 1941 and 1944 for use as anti-submarine convoy escorts, named after rivers in the United Kingdom. The ships were designed by naval engineer William Reed, of Smith's Dock Company of South Bank-on-Tees, to have the endurance and anti-submarine capabilities of the Black Swan-class sloops, while being quick and cheap to build in civil dockyards using the machinery (e.g. reciprocating steam engines instead of turbines) and construction techniques pioneered in the building of the Flower-class corvettes. Its purpose was to improve on the convoy escort classes in service with the Royal Navy at the time, including the Flower class.

In October 1943 Findhorn escorted the battleship HMS Royal Sovereign on her journey from Norfolk, Virginia, to Argentina, and finally to Greenock, Scotland.

On 12 August 1944, Findhorn and HMIS Godavari were sent to hunt down the German submarine U-198 after she had been sighted by aircraft from the escort carrier HMS Shah. Godavari made radar contact first and directed the two ships to close in. Eventually after firing many Hedgehog depth charges explosions were heard aboard Findhorn, and U-198's sinking was confirmed the next day by a large oil slick. This was the only U-boat sunk in the Indian Ocean by a hunter-killer group of the entire war.

For the remainder of the Second World War Findhorn mainly severed in convoy escort duties until she was returned to US service in March 1946.
