= Pinang =

Pinang may refer to:

- Areca nut
- Penang, state in Malaysia
- Pangkal Pinang, Indonesia
- Pinang, Tangerang, a district of Tangerang City, Banten, Indonesia
- Tanjung Pinang, Indonesia

== See also ==
- Penang (disambiguation)
