= Penang ferry service =

Ferry service in the Malaysian state of Penang

Penang Ferry Service
- A catamaran off the Raja Tun Uda Ferry Terminal in George Town
- Locale: Penang
- Waterway: Penang Strait
- Transit type: Passenger and motorcycle ferries
- Owner: Penang Port Commission
- Operator: Penang Port Sdn Bhd
- Began operation: 1894; 132 years ago
- System length: 3 km (1.9 mi)
- No. of lines: 1
- No. of vessels: 4
- No. of terminals: 2
- Yearly ridership: 2,125,834 (2024)
Route map

The Penang ferry service is a public ferry system in the Malaysian state of Penang. It operates within the Penang Strait and connects George Town with mainland Seberang Perai. Operated by Penang Port Sdn Bhd (PPSB), the service comprises a fleet of four catamarans that operate between the Raja Tun Uda and Sultan Abdul Halim terminals.

Established in 1894 by local entrepreneur Quah Beng Kee and his brothers, the ferry service is the oldest in Malaysia. In 1924, the Penang Harbour Board (PHB), a predecessor of the present-day Penang Port Commission (PPC), took over the operation of cross-strait ferry services and the subsequent year saw the introduction of vessels capable of transporting automobiles. This ferry service remained the only transportation link between George Town and the mainland until the completion of the Penang Bridge in 1985. In 1994, PPSB acquired the service from the PPC.

From 2017 to 2020, the ferry service came under the management of Prasarana Malaysia and was rebranded as Rapid Ferry. However, persistent maintenance issues and an aging fleet led to a brief suspension of the service in 2020. PPSB regained control of the service in 2021 and introduced smaller passenger-only speedboats as a temporary measure. In 2023, the current fleet of four catamarans became operational. Throughout 2024, the ferries recorded a ridership of 2.1 million passengers and 747,785 vehicles.

== History ==
=== Establishment and expansion ===
The first cross-strait ferry service between George Town and Province Wellesley (now Seberang Perai) was launched in 1894 by local entrepreneur Quah Beng Kee and his brothers. Operating under the Beng Brothers brand, the service utilised small launches to transport passengers from Kedah Pier in George Town to Mitchell Pier at Butterworth. At the time, the fleet consisted of three steamers and seven smaller steam launches. In addition to the ferry service, the Beng Brothers managed transportation routes to various locations, including Teluk Air Tawar, Bagan Ajam, Bagan Luar, Simpang Ampat, Bukit Tambun and Kuala Kurau.

In 1897, Quah Beng Kee acquired his siblings' shares in the Beng Brothers and began operating the ferry service under Guan Lee Hin Steamship Company, which later evolved into the Eastern Shipping Company Limited. The company also expanded its routes to include other parts of British Malaya, as well as Sumatra, Siam and Burma.

In 1914, following the outbreak of World War I, the Straits Settlements government requisitioned all private vessels, including those owned by the Eastern Shipping Company. Apart from the Battle of Penang, the war had a minimal impact in Malaya and the vessels were returned to their owners by the end of the year.

In 1922, the ferry service between the Kedah and Mitchell piers was acquired by the Straits Steamship Company Limited. In December 1924, control of the ferry service was transferred to the Penang Harbour Board (predecessor of the present-day Penang Port Commission). All other local ferry services were discontinued, with the exception of a separate ferry service that transported passengers of the Federated Malay States Railways to Perai.

Mitchell Pier was found to be inadequate in depth during low tide for automobile-carrying ferries, which the harbour board deemed necessary to accommodate the growing use of cars in Malaya at that time. This prompted the construction of new piers at Church Street Ghaut in George Town and Bagan Luar at Butterworth. In 1925, a decked-in lighter, towed by a steam launch, was introduced to facilitate automobile transportation. The trial service proved successful, leading to the construction of a new steam-powered vessel – named the Seberang – by the Singapore Harbour Board (SHB) in the same year. To accommodate increasing ridership, the SHB constructed two additional vessels, the Tanjong and the Kulim, by 1929.

Ridership continued to rise and by 1937, the Seberang was deemed insufficient in size for vehicular traffic. The SHB consequently constructed the Bagan in 1938 to replace the Seberang. In 1939, the three ferries – Tanjong, Kulim and Bagan – recorded a ridership of 1.856 million passengers and 113,000 vehicles.

In December 1941, during the Japanese invasion of Malaya, the British scuttled the Kulim in the Penang Strait to prevent its use by Japanese forces. The Tanjong, which had suffered engine damage, was sunk by gunfire. The Bagan was put to use for the evacuation of Europeans to Singapore and subsequently to Sumatra. The vessel was seized by the Imperial Japanese Navy during the final leg of its journey and subsequently used to support the conquest of the Dutch East Indies.

=== Post-war restoration ===
Under Japanese occupation, Penang had no effective ferry service. The Japanese operated an irregular service using a wooden vessel for passengers and decked-in lighters towed by launches for vehicles. After Japan's defeat in 1945, the British Military Administration reinstated the ferry service, temporarily deploying four Z-type tank landing crafts acquired from the British Army. The following year, the Penang Harbour Board was reconstituted and the Bagan was returned to Penang, resuming cross-strait services. Two of the landing crafts were modified and renamed the Senangin and the Lidah, while the other two, renamed the Talang and the Tenggiri, were refitted with a new passenger deck to enhance passenger comfort.

In 1946, the ferry service recorded a ridership of approximately 247,000 passengers. By 1956, ridership had increased nearly threefold, reaching about 711,000 passengers. In 1951, the harbour board proposed an increase in service frequency to one ferry every 15 minutes. To facilitate a comprehensive overhaul of the ferry service, the harbour board engaged consulting engineers Bruce White, Wolfe Barry & Partners from London in 1953. The resulting study recommended replacing the existing fleet with a new generation of ferries designed for enhanced capacity, power and maneuverability, with separate decks for passengers and vehicles. Additionally, the study advised the construction of new terminals, each designed with double berths to increase service frequency. In 1956, the Penang Port Commission (PPC) subsumed the harbour board as the port authority of the Port of Penang and assumed control of the ferry service.

In 1955, contracts were awarded for the construction of new double-ended ferries featuring end-loading capabilities for vehicular embarkation and disembarkation. The contract for a single prototype was awarded to the SHB, while Cheoy Lee Shipyard in Hong Kong received a contract for four additional vessels. The SHB-built prototype, named Pulau Pinang, commenced service in 1957. It had a weight of 180 tonnes and was equipped with a cycloidal propulsion system, while retaining the older side-loading capability that was compatible with existing piers until new ferry terminals were completed.

The four ferries constructed in Hong Kong – named Pulau Aman, Pulau Langkawi, Pulau Tioman and Pulau Pangkor – were launched into service in 1959. Later that year, the new terminals – Raja Tun Uda in George Town and Sultan Abdul Halim at Butterworth – were inaugurated by Malaya's Prime Minister Tunku Abdul Rahman.

=== Decline ===
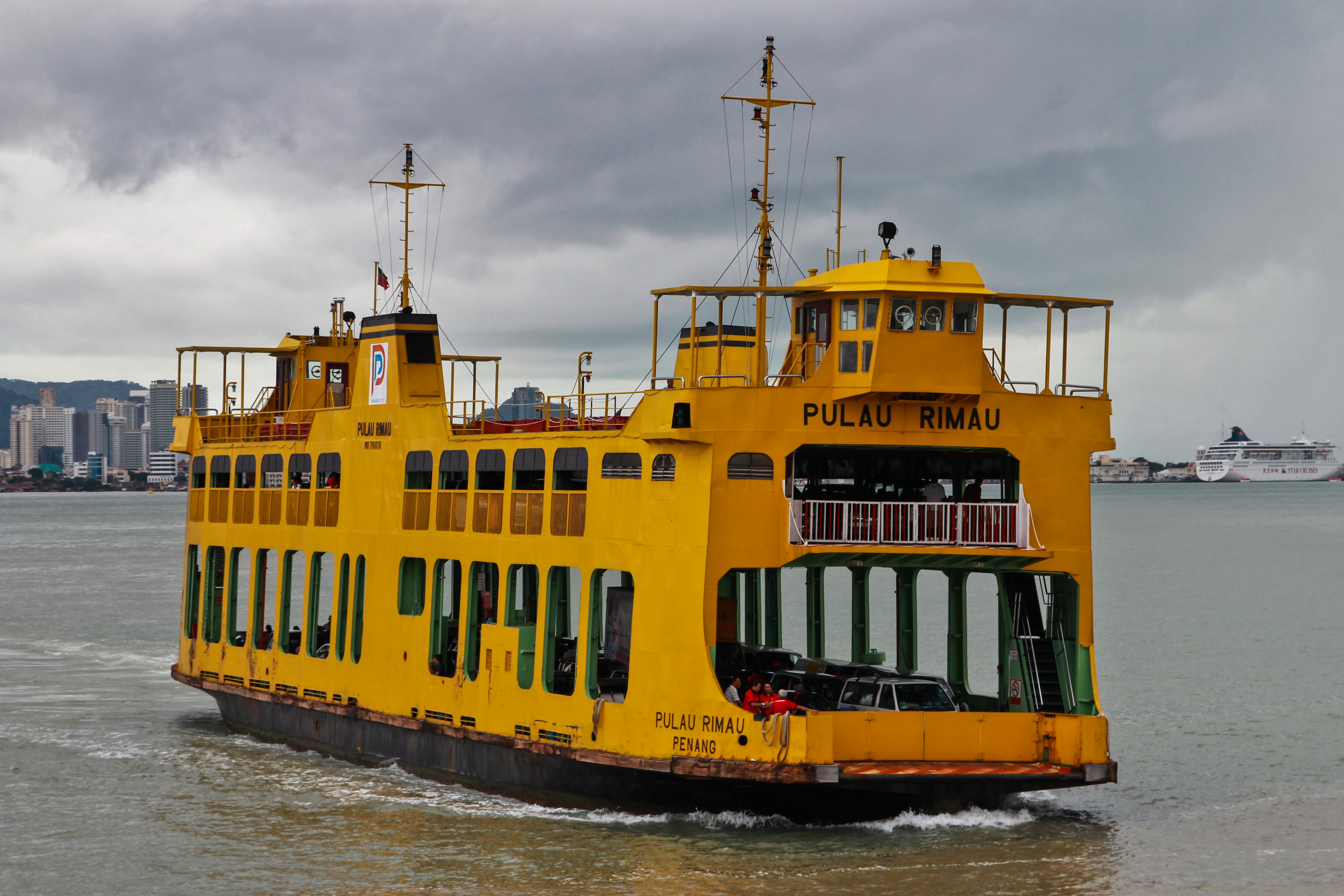
Pulau Rimau c. 2012, sporting the iconic yellow livery of the old ferry fleet.

In post-independence Penang, the ferry service maintained its role as the only mode of cross-strait transportation between George Town and Seberang Perai. A total of 15 vessels were commissioned between 1959 and 2002. The overreliance on ferries resulted in traffic congestion at the ferry terminals. In the 1970s, Malaysian Prime Minister Abdul Razak Hussein mooted the construction of a bridge linking Penang Island to the mainland, which became the Penang Bridge. Following its opening in 1985, vehicular traffic shifted to the bridge, which led to a decrease in demand for the ferry service.

On 31 July 1988, a pedestrian bridge at the Sultan Abdul Halim terminal collapsed due to overcrowding, killing 32 passengers. This incident adversely affected the reputation of the ferry service, which was also plagued by an aging fleet, rising maintenance costs and a scarcity of spare parts from Europe. In 1994, the ferry service was acquired from the PPC by Penang Port Sdn Bhd (PPSB), a government-linked company under the Minister of Finance (Incorporated). However, by the 2010s, PPSB reported annual losses amounting to tens of millions of ringgit, with the ferry service requiring RM22 million yearly to sustain daily operations.

In May 2018, Prasarana Malaysia, the operator of the Rapid Penang public bus service, acquired the ferry service and terminals from PPSB, which then rebranded the service as Rapid Ferry. However, the ferries were still plagued by persistent maintenance issues. By 2020, only two ferries remained in operation and mechanical failures became frequent, resulting in numerous service disruptions. At the end of 2020, all ferries, except for Pulau Angsa, were retired from service. PPSB reabsorbed the ferry service on 1 January 2021.

=== Revival ===
As PPSB reassumed management of the ferry service in 2021, speedboats were introduced as a temporary measure while new catamarans were being constructed. The last of the older fleet, Pulau Angsa, remained in service transporting motorcyclists and bicycles, but was decommissioned later that year and subsequently acquired by the Penang state government. In August 2023, four new catamarans, built in Vietnam, were introduced into service, replacing the speedboats that had been in use since 2021. Unlike the older automobile-carrying ferries, the catamarans were designed specifically to transport motorcycles and bicycles, in addition to passengers on foot.

On 1 September 2026, the ferry Teluk Bahang had a collision with the tanker MV Mekar Jaya. The ferry was sailing towards Pengkalan Sultan Abdul Halim when it collided with the tanker sailing from Butterworth Deep Water Wharf to Swettenham Pier Cruise Terminal. Out of 140 passengers aboard the ferry, 21 were injured. Investigations of the incident is still ongoing, with an initial report submitted to a Transport Ministry task force.

== Ferry fleet ==
The four catamarans in the current fleet are named after coastal suburbs and areas in Penang.

=== Current ===
Deck configuration	Name	Year in service	Deadweight tonnage	IMO ship identification number	Image
Passenger, motorcycles and bicycles	Teluk Bahang	2023	150	9977610	
Passenger, motorcycles and bicycles	Teluk Duyung	2023	150	9977646	
Passenger, motorcycles and bicycles	Teluk Kumbar	2023	150	9977622	
Passenger, motorcycles and bicycles	Teluk Kampi	2023	150	9977634	

=== Retired ===
Upper deck configuration	Name	Year in service	Deadweight tonnage	IMO ship identification number	Image	Remark
Passenger	Seberang	1925	N/A	N/A		Replaced by Bagan in 1938 and subsequently sold off.
Passenger	Kulim	1929	N/A	N/A		Scuttled in the Penang Strait during the Japanese invasion of 1941.
Passenger	Tanjong	1929	N/A	N/A		Sunk by gunfire in the Penang Strait during the Japanese invasion of 1941.
Mixed	Bagan	1938	N/A	N/A		Seized by the Imperial Japanese Navy in 1941, returned to service in 1946.
Mixed	Pulau Pinang	1957	N/A			Sold and repurposed as KMP Aeng Mas in the Madura Strait.
Mixed	Pulau Aman	1959	139	5286831		Destroyed in a fire in Johor in 2003.
Mixed	Pulau Langkawi	1959	139	5286867		
Mixed	Pulau Pangkor	1959	139	5286893		
Mixed	Pulau Tioman	1959	139	5287017		
Mixed	Pulau Lumut	1965	139	6422913		Last spotted at Sepanggar in Kota Kinabalu as of 2018.
Mixed	Pulau Redang	1971	139	7030470		
Passenger	Pulau Labuan	1971	139	7038408		
Mixed	Pulau Undan	1975	262	734724		To be scrapped as of 2024.
Mixed	Pulau Rawa	1975	262	7343736		Scrapped in the Perak River.
Mixed	Pulau Talang Talang	1975	262	7343748		In dry dock in Manjung as of 2024; to be scrapped.
Mixed	Pulau Rimau	1980	100	7911076		Converted into a restaurant sited near Queensbay Mall.
Mixed	Pulau Angsa	1981	100	8010491		Acquired by the Penang state government in 2021.
Mixed	Pulau Kapas	1981	280	8101082		Sunk at the Sultan Abdul Halim Terminal in 2024.
Vehicle	Pulau Payar	2002	440	9254393		In storage; to be repurposed into a restaurant.
Vehicle	Pulau Pinang	2002	440	9275244		Preserved as a museum ship (Penang Ferry Museum).
Passenger	Kenangan 1,2 and 3	1999	156	8958784		Replaced by present-day catamarans in 2023.

== Operational statistics ==
Annual ridership of the Penang ferry service
Year	Lorries	Cars	Motorcycles	Bicycles	Foot passengers	Remarks
2026	0	0	443,587	3,984	1,453,610	As of July 2026
2025	0	0	775,877	8,118	2,347,066	
2024	0	0	737,132	10,653	2,125,834	
2023	0	0	303,789	7,860	1,900,009	
2022	0	0	359,972	6,216	1,182,150	
2021	0	0	302,423	5,998	499,408	
2020	5,821	226,695	418,326	10,871	625,926	
2019	12,517	498,922	765,725	11,964	1,536,373	
2018	19,351	475,933	835,322	12,263	1,383,581	
