= MV Empire City =

World War II merchant ship of the United Kingdom

History
- Name: Empire City
- Owner: Ministry of Transport
- Operator: A Weir & Co Ltd
- Port of registry: (United Kingdom) Sunderland
- Builder: Swan, Hunter & Wigham Richardson Ltd
- Launched: 15 July 1943
- Completed: November 1943
- Identification: Code Letters BFLB; United Kingdom Official Number 180046

General characteristics
- Type: Cargo ship
- Tonnage: 7,295 GRT; 4,941 NRT
- Length: 428 ft 8 in (130.66 m)
- Beam: 56 ft 5 in (17.20 m)
- Depth: 35 ft 5 in (10.80 m)
- Installed power: 2SCSA diesel engine
- Propulsion: Screw propeller
- Crew: 50, plus 20 DEMS gunners
- Armament: Anti-torpedo nets

Location of the sinking of Empire City off Mozambique.

Empire City was a 7,295 GRT cargo ship which was built in 1943 by William Doxford & Sons Ltd, Sunderland for the Ministry of War Transport (MoWT). She was torpedoed and sunk on 6 August 1944 by U-198.

== Description ==
Empire City was built by William Doxford & Sons Ltd, Sunderland. She was launched on 15 July 1943.

The ship was 428 feet 8 inches (130.66 m) long, with a beam of 56 feet 5 inches (17.20 m) and a depth of 35 feet 5 inches (10.80 m). She had a GRT of 7,295 and a NRT of 4,941.

The ship was propelled by a 2-stroke Single Cycle Single Action diesel engine, which had eight cylinders of 23 5/8 inches (60 cm) diameter by 91 5/16 inches (231.9 cm) stroke.

== History ==
Empire City was built for the MoWT. She was placed under the management of the A Weir & Co Ltd. Her port of registry was Sunderland. The Code Letters BFLB and the United Kingdom Official Number 180046 were allocated.

Empire City was a member of a number of convoys in the Second World War.

ON 212

Convoy ON 212 departed Liverpool on 19 November 1943 and arrived at New York on 5 December. Empire City had departed from Milford Haven, Pembrokeshire on 18 November. She was equipped with anti-torpedo nets on this voyage.

DKA 21

Empire City was a member of Convoy DKA 21, which departed Lourenço Marques, Portuguese East Africa bound for Port Said, Egypt via Aden. Empire City was carrying a cargo of 8,403 tons of coal. On 6 August 1944, she was torpedoed and sunk by U-198 off Mocímboa da Praia, Portuguese East Africa (11°33′S 41°25′E). Two crew (Engineers) were killed. The surviving 48 crew and 20 DEMS gunners were rescued. They were landed at Pekawi, Portuguese East Africa. U-198 was sunk on 12 August. Those lost on Empire City are commemorated at the Tower Hill Memorial, London.
