= HMS Choudri =

Pakistani admiral (1911-2004)

Vice Admiral HMS Choudri HPk MBE
- ایچ ایم ایس چوہدری
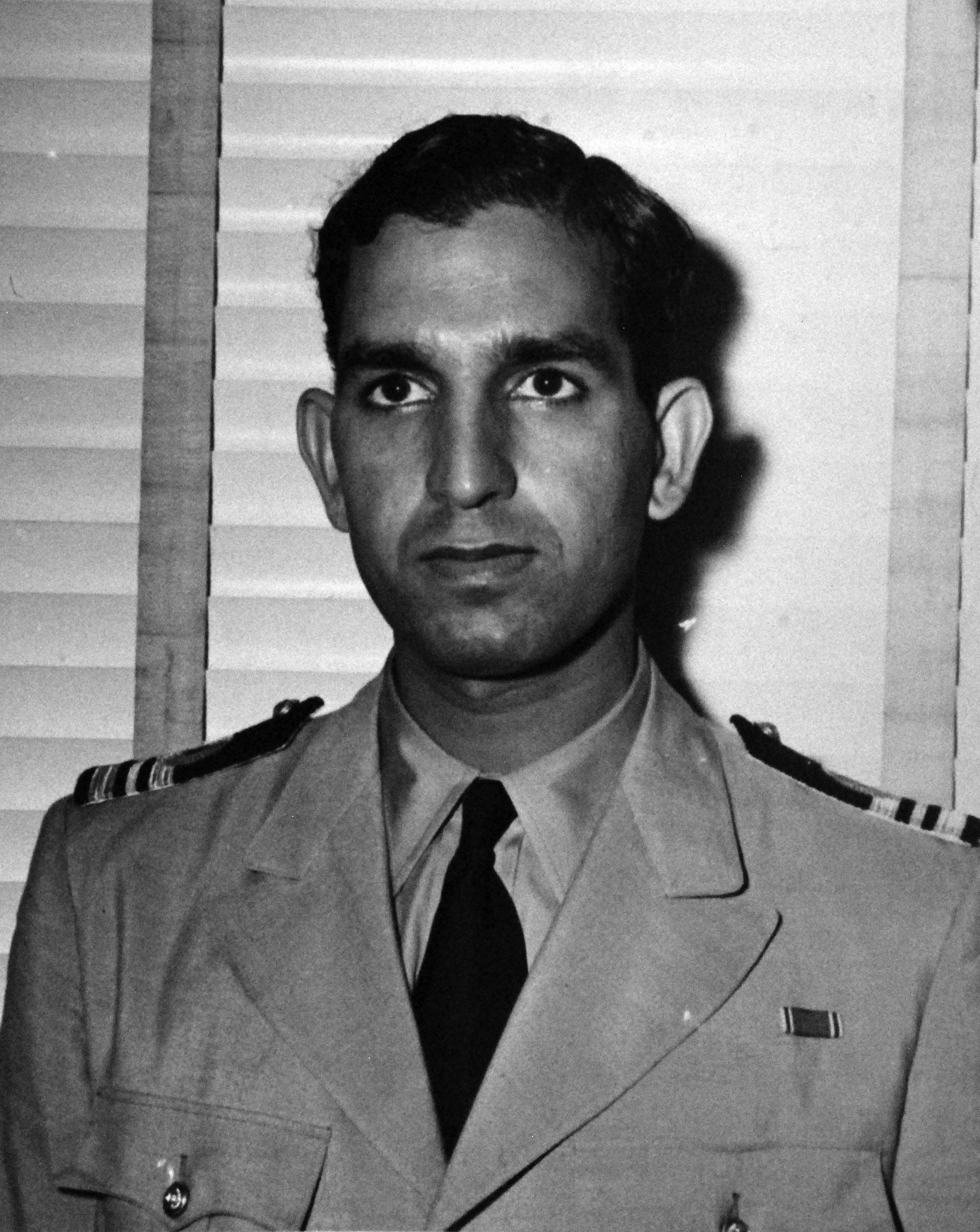
- Lt. Commander Choudhri, 1943

2nd Commander-in-Chief Pakistan Navy
- In office 31 January 1953 – 28 February 1959
- President: Iskander Mirza (1956–1958); Ayub Khan (1958-1969)
- Governors General: Malik Ghulam Muhammad (1951-1955); Iskandar Mirza (1955-1956)
- Preceded by: James Wilfred Jefford
- Succeeded by: Afzal Rahman Khan

Personal details
- Born: Mohammad Siddiq Choudri; 10 May 1911 Batala, Gurdaspur, British Raj
- Died: 27 February 2004 (aged 92) PNS Shifa Hospital, Sindh, Pakistan
- Cause of death: Heart attack
- Spouse: Raffia Aslam (m. 1945)
- Children: 2
- Relatives: Nazir Ahmed (brother-in-law)
- Education: Forman Christian College (BSc (Hons)); Britannia Royal Naval College; Imperial Defence College

Military service
- Branch/service: Royal Indian Navy (1930-1947); Pakistan Navy (1947-1959)
- Years of service: 1930–1959
- Rank: Vice Admiral
- Commands: HMIS Rohilkhand (J180); HMIS Godavari
- Battles/wars: World War II; East African campaign; Operation Appearance; Pacific War; Burma campaign (1944–1945)

Haji Mohammad Siddiq Choudri (Note: Urdu: حاجی محمد صدیق چوہدری; Sometimes spelled as Hajee Mohammed Siddiq Choudri or Muhammad Siddique Chaudhry) (10 May 1911 — 27 February 2004) better known as HMS Choudri, (Note: Sometimes spelled as H.M.S. Choudri, H.M.S. Chaudhri, H.M.S. Chaudri, or H.M.S. Choudhry.) was a businessman, industrialist, and the first native and second Commander-in-Chief of the Pakistan Navy, serving from 1953 to 1959. He also briefly held the role of deputy chief martial law administrator in the military regime of General Ayub Khan following the 1958 Pakistani military coup.

Born in Batala, Choudri performed the Islamic pilgrimage to Mecca with his mother in the late 1920s and thus came to be known as Haji. After studying Industrial chemistry at the Forman Christian College, he and his elder brother, CM Latif, founded the Venus Brothers soap factory in 1930, using rudimentary training from college. Their product, Boss Soap, was modeled after Lever Brothers Lifebuoy Soap and earned a reputation for quality, despite initial skepticism from Hindu consumers who mistakenly believed it contained cow fat, and strong competition from the company's Sunlight Soap.

Eventually, his brother Latif suggested he pursue a career in the Royal Indian Marines. After failing the exam, Choudri succeeded on his second attempt when a family friend convinced him to retake it. The British Indian government intended to send him to England for training as long as he paid half the costs. The family had a long discussion about the offer—Latif was very keen on it, Choudri was concerned about being able to afford it, and their mother was against the plan.

On his graduation from the Britannia Royal Naval College and return to India in 1933, Choudri was the first Indian to obtain an executive commission into the Royal Indian Navy and was assigned to HMIS Hindustan, which was the newest frigate in the Indian fleet.

== Early life ==
As per the family biography, Mohammad Siddiq Choudhri was born in 1909, but according to naval records he was born on 10 May 1911. He was the youngest child of Mehr Miran Baksh, a Zamindar from Batala, and his second wife Allah Rakhi.

In 1912, when Choudri was either three years old, or possibly only one year old depending on which of the two birth dates is most accurate, his father died. Though illiterate himself, Mehr Miran Baksh's final wish to Allah Rakhi was to have all three of their sons educated, a request he repeatedly emphasised on his deathbed.

== Personal life ==
Choudri married Raffia Aslam on 7 October 1945 in Bombay. She was the sister of Razia, the wife of Dr. Nazir Ahmad. They had two sons, Rishad and Umair.

At a ceremony at the Portsmouth Historic Dockyard on 5 July 1957, Raffia renamed the HMS Diadem to PNS Babur on its transfer to the Pakistan Navy.

=== Assets ===
During a 1988 debate in the Senate of Pakistan, it was reported that (Retd) Vice Admiral Choudhri was among several civilian and military officers who imported duty-free vehicles between 5 June 1977 and 20 March 1985. He imported a Mercedes-Benz 240D in 1981.

== Service years ==
=== Royal Indian Navy and World War II service ===
He passed the open examination for the Royal Indian Navy in Delhi in November 1930 and was the first Indian to be admitted to the Executive branch in 1931. In September 1931, he joined the HMS Erebus. In 1932, he was appointed as midshipman on a destroyer for four months and then took courses in gunnery, torpedo, navigation, signals, and minesweeping. After training in England, Sub-lieutenant Choudri returned to British India in September 1933.

A 1935 edition of Proceedings stated, "His home is in the Punjab, and as the first Indian to be a potential commanding officer of one of India's fighting ships his career will be watched with keen and sympathetic interest. So far, his progress is described as excellent."

During World War II in March 1941, the 15th Punjab Regiment was the first to land on Italian shores and was carried by HMIS Parvati, an auxiliary minesweeper, under Commanding Officer Lieutenant HMS Choudri.

On a mission near the Italian-controlled port of Assab in the Red Sea on 30 April 1941, the Parvati was ordered to patrol the area due to suspected mines near the harbor. Later that day, British cruiser HMS Ceres arrived and directed the Parvati and motor launch Eureka to assist in a reconnaissance mission. While following the Ceres, the Parvati spotted and avoided one floating mine, but shortly after, struck another unseen mine. The explosion caused severe damage and the front of the ship quickly began to sink. Choudri immediately ordered the crew to abandon ship and stayed aboard to direct the evacuation and signaled nearby ships that the vessel was sinking. As the Parvati went under, he jumped into the sea and was pulled underwater several times by the suction of the sinking ship. He managed to survive by holding onto a floating wooden box for more than an hour before being rescued by the motor launch Eureka. The Parvati sank within about a minute and a half after hitting the mine. There were 16 casualties and 21 survivors.

In 1942, he was sent to Britain where he qualified as a specialist officer in the Torpedo branch and then went to the United States in 1943 where he delivered lectures on the role of the Royal Indian Navy. In March 1944, Lieutenant Commander Choudri was appointed Commanding Officer of the minesweeper, HMIS Rohilkhand.

On 10 February 1945, acting Lieutenant Commander Choudri was appointed Commanding Officer of HMIS Godavari, one of the newer sloops of the Navy. In the 1945 Birthday Honours List, he was appointed an Additional Member of the Military Division of the Most Excellent Order of the British Empire (MBE).

In October 1945, he was promoted to the rank of Commodore. He was appointed to a committee to advise the Government of India on nationalisation of the Defence services on 13 November 1946.

==== Partition ====
Captain Choudri was among four officers—two Muslim and two Hindu—appointed to the sub-committee responsible for dividing the assets of the Royal Indian Navy between the newly proposed states of India and Pakistan.

=== Pakistan Navy ===
After the Partition of British India in August 1947, Captain Choudri transferred to the Royal Pakistan Navy and was appointed Chief of Staff under Vice Admiral Jefford. Around the same time, Choudri and Air Commodore Subroto Mukerjee, R.I.A.F., were elected as Vice-Presidents of the United Service Institution of India, which was being redesignated as the "United Services Institution of India and Pakistan." In 1948, Choudri became the first Pakistani naval officer to be promoted to the rank of Commodore.

In January 1950, Commodore Choudri went to the United Kingdom to attend the Imperial Defence College and in his absence, Admiral Jefford took over Chief of Staff duties. On 30 May 1950, it was announced that Commodore Choudri would succeed Rear Admiral Jefford as Commander-in-Chief of the Royal Pakistan Navy.

In 1951, Commodore Choudri decided that submarines and warships should be built indigenously, but was told that second-hand ships from the United Kingdom would be better off for Pakistan. In 1995, The News International wrote that because of this decision, "the Pakistani Navy has had to live with obsolete vessels".

==== Commander-in-Chief (1953-1959) ====
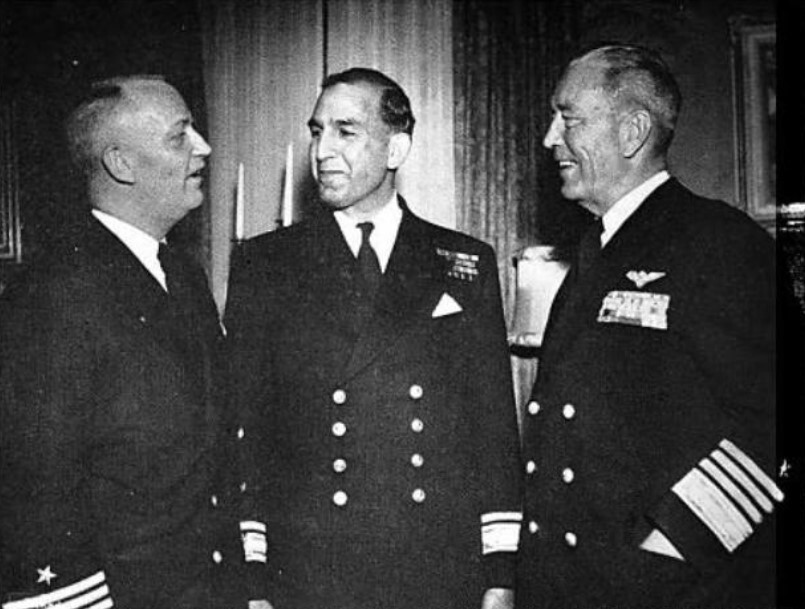
Rear Admiral Choudri (middle) and Admiral Radford (right) listen as Admiral Burke (left) shares naval reminiscences during a reception hosted by Ambassador Mohammad Ali Bogra, with Choudri as the guest of honor, 1956

On 31 January 1953, Rear Admiral Choudri took over as the first native and second Commander-in-Chief of the Royal Pakistan Navy from Vice Admiral Jefford.

In February 1956, the Athens Banner-Herald referred to him as "H.M.S.P. Choudri." According to the report, the "P" was added at the request of the British Navy because messages identifying him as "HMS Choudri" often led to confusion with the British destroyer HMS Chaudiere, especially when he was operating in the Mediterranean Sea. The article also noted that the Pakistani embassy hosted a reception in his honour during his visit to the United States. It further described him as "strictly the polished, drawing-room type when not on the bridge."

During his tenure as chief, Vice Admiral Choudri expanded, modernised, and made the navy self sufficient in many ways including the addition of a dockyard, depots, and training establishments. He also believed that: "the defence of East Pakistan has to be based on water."

A marine committee established in November 1958 under the Chairmanship of Vice Admiral Choudri released its report in October 1959 and recommended the creation of a national shipping corporation to strengthen Pakistan's role in global trade. The committee proposed that existing shipowners cooperate by assigning capable vessels from the country's coastal fleet to overseas trade routes. According to the Ministry of Commerce, these recommendations were quickly put into action through the establishment of Pakistan Shipping Line Limited, a consortium of six Pakistani shipping companies. The new company also planned to operate six ships on routes connecting Pakistan with the United Kingdom and continental Europe, and had already applied for berthing rights at foreign ports.

According to Altaf Gauhar, Admiral Choudri and General Ayub Khan had a "bitter" exchange at a Joint Chiefs of Staff meeting on 13 July 1958.

===== Resignation =====
Following a "stormy interview" with President Ayub Khan, he resigned as chief on 26 January 1959 and cited the government's "decisions concerning the present and the future shape and size of the Navy [which] have been taken in disagreement with the technical advice I have consistently rendered... in matters concerning the concept of our defense, the apportionment of our available defense budget... and the size and shape of our Navy etc. This advice has throughout been based on my sincere conviction that the Navy of the size and shape that I was pleading for was the right answer to the defense of the country from the naval point of view. I still adhere to that view."

According to (Retd) Rear Admiral Khalid Wasay, Choudri resigned because of longstanding disagreements with President Ayub Khan over the future of the Pakistan Navy. Choudri believed Pakistan needed a strong and modern navy, mainly due to the geographical separation between East and West Pakistan, and called for naval expansion and the acquisition of major warships. In contrast, Ayub Khan prioritised the Pakistan Army and Pakistan Air Force and opposed allocating significant resources to the navy.

Wasay also claims that tensions between the two extended beyond defence policy as Choudri successfully resisted Ayub Khan's attempts to become supreme commander of the Pakistan Armed Forces. Khalid described Ayub as "sea-blind," meaning unable to understand Pakistan's maritime needs and said Choudri was a professional naval officer devoted to strengthening the navy. As a result of Ayub's refusal to support the navy's expansion, Khalid said that Choudri ultimately "resigned in disgust."

According to M.H. Askari, another source of contention was Admiral Choudri's belief that if India were to impose a blockade of Pakistan's sea lines of communication, which could be done without a formal declaration of war, the Pakistan Army and the Pakistan Air Force would be rendered ineffective in a matter of weeks as they were dependent on foreign supplies. He also wrote that Choudri stressed the need for a suitable naval base in East Pakistan but received no support.

According to Vice Admiral Iqbal F. Qadir, Choudri was to depart without any farewell ceremonies. After the government announced Admiral Choudri's retirement and appointed Commodore Afzal Rahman Khan as his successor, Iqbal contacted Commodore Khan to find out what ceremonies were planned for the outgoing chief.

To Iqbal's surprise, Commodore Khan told him that Admiral Choudri was not to receive any farewell ceremony at all. He would simply leave office quietly, without any formal send off and without meeting senior naval officers. Commodore Khan told Iqbal that that he was following the orders he had received.

Iqbal was taken aback by this because he believed that an officer who had given so much in building Pakistan's Navy deserved to leave with dignity. He felt that it was unfair for such a senior officer to depart without acknowledging his service.

Iqbal then spoke with Captain S. M. Ahsan, the Deputy Chief of Naval Staff (Personnel), and told him that as the officer responsible for ceremonies, he should have advised the C-in-C Designate, Commodore Afzal Rahman Khan, that Admiral Choudri's departure required proper honours. Captain Ahsan suggested that Iqbal speak directly with Commodore Khan.

Although Khan was initially reluctant because he felt bound by the verbal orders he had received, he eventually agreed to discuss the matter further. Iqbal, Ahsan, and Commodore Khan met again where they pleaded with Khan to take the matter to President Ayub Khan. Commodore Khan agreed to bring the issue to the President's attention and a few days later he informed Iqbal that the President had approved a minimum level of farewell ceremonies for Admiral Choudri's departure. Iqbal described this as only a partial success as future farewell ceremonies became unprecedented in scale, far greater than what had initially been allowed.

== Later life and social work ==
Sometime after his retirement, he was elected Chairman of a special committee set up to reorganise the Federation of Pakistan Chambers of Commerce & Industry and was later elected as its first President. He established a technical school (now Pakistan Foundation High School) in Lahore with the support of his brothers, C.M. Latif and Shafiq Choudri in 1959.

In the late 1980s or early 1990s, he formed the "Foundation for Development through Moral Revival", a non-profit public charity trust. According to naval historian John B. Hattendorf, the purpose was to gather intellectuals and people interested in discussing matters of national importance.

He also established the Pakistan Institute of Maritime Affairs in 1991, The Foundation for Development of Moral Revival, and served as a Member of the Pakistan Hypertension League.

== Death ==
On the evening of 27 February 2004, Choudhri died from a heart attack at PNS Shifa Hospital, at the age of 92. He was buried with full military honours at the Army graveyard, Karachi on the night of 29 February.

The funeral ceremony was attended by Chief of Naval Staff Admiral Shahid Karimullah and former naval chiefs Muzaffar Hassan, Mohammad Shariff, Karamat Rahman Niazi, Tariq Kamal Khan, Iftikhar Ahmed Sirohey, Yastur-ul-Haq Malik, Saeed Mohammad Khan, and other senior serving and retired officers of the Pakistan Armed Forces.

== Legacy and Commemorations ==
Lieutenant Commander Raja Rab Nawaz, in his thesis at the Naval Postgraduate School published in December 2004, wrote: "Despite all the challenges that the Pakistan Navy faced in its formative years, it was lucky to be led by a competent and visionary leader in the form of Vice Admiral H. M. S. Choudri."

In 2008, the Vice-Admiral Choudhri Memorial Lecture was launched.

The Pakistan Navy established its naval air station at Turbat in 2014 and named it PNS Siddique in his honour.

In 2025, the 11th Vice Admiral H.M.S Chaudhry Amateur Golf Cup was held at the Defence Raya Golf and Country Club.

== Published work ==
Lt. Commander H.M.S. Choudhri (1944). U.S. Interest In India. The Indian Listener. p. 19.
