= German submarine U-198 =

German World War II submarine

History

Nazi Germany
- Name: U-198
- Ordered: 4 November 1940
- Builder: Deschimag, AG Weser, Bremen
- Yard number: 1044
- Laid down: 1 August 1941
- Launched: 15 June 1942
- Commissioned: 3 November 1942
- Fate: Sunk, 12 August 1944

General characteristics
- Class & type: Type IXD2 submarine
- Displacement: 1,610 t (1,580 long tons) surfaced; 1,799 t (1,771 long tons) submerged
- Length: 87.58 m (287.3 ft) o/a; 68.50 m (224.7 ft) pressure hull
- Beam: 7.50 m (24.6 ft) o/a; 4.40 m (14.4 ft) pressure hull
- Height: 10.20 m (33 ft 6 in)
- Draught: 5.40 m (17 ft 9 in)
- Installed power: 9,000 PS (6,620 kW; 8,880 bhp) (diesels); 1,000 PS (740 kW; 990 shp) (electric)
- Propulsion: 2 shafts; 2 × diesel engines; 2 × electric motors
- Speed: 29.8 knots (55.2 km/h; 34.3 mph) surfaced; 6.9 knots (12.8 km/h; 7.9 mph) submerged
- Range: 12,750 nmi (23,610 km; 14,670 mi) at 10 knots (19 km/h; 12 mph) surfaced; 57 nmi (106 km; 66 mi) at 4 knots (7.4 km/h; 4.6 mph) submerged
- Test depth: Calculated crush depth: 230 m (750 ft)
- Complement: 55-64
- Armament: 6 × torpedo tubes (four bow, two stern); 24 × 53.3 cm (21 in) torpedoes; 1 × 10.5 cm (4.1 in) SK C/32 deck gun (150 rounds); 1 × 3.7 cm (1.5 in) SK C/30; 1 × 2 cm (0.79 in) C/30 anti-aircraft guns

Service record
- Part of: 4th U-boat Flotilla; 3 November 1942 - 31 March 1943; 12th U-boat Flotilla; 1 April 1943 - 12 August 1944
- Identification codes: M 49 158
- Commanders: Kapt.z.S. Werner Hartmann; 3 November 1942 - 15 January 1944; Oblt.z.S. Burkhard Heusinger von Waldegg; 21 January - 12 August 1944
- Operations: 2 patrols: 1st patrol: a. 9 March - 24 September 1943; b. 23–25 March 1944; 2nd patrol: a. 20 April - 12 August 1944
- Victories: 11 merchant ships sunk (59,690 GRT)

German submarine U-198, was a Type IXD2 U-boat which fought in World War II. She was built by the Deschimag DeSchiMAG AG Weser in Bremen. She was laid down on 1 August 1941 as yard number 1044, launched on 15 June 1942 and commissioned on 3 November under Kapitän zur See Werner Hartmann.

The boat was sunk on 12 August 1944 near the Seychelles, by depth charges from a British frigate and an Indian sloop. The submarine is credited with sinking eleven ships, for a total of 59,690 gross register tons (GRT).

== Design ==
German Type IXD2 submarines were considerably larger than the original Type IXs. U-198 had a displacement of 1,610 tonnes (1,580 long tons) when at the surface and 1,799 tonnes (1,771 long tons) while submerged. The U-boat had a total length of 87.58 m (287 ft 4 in), a pressure hull length of 68.50 m (224 ft 9 in), a beam of 7.50 m (24 ft 7 in), a height of 10.20 m (33 ft 6 in), and a draught of 5.35 m (17 ft 7 in). The submarine was powered by two MAN M 9 V 40/46 supercharged four-stroke, nine-cylinder diesel engines plus two MWM RS34.5S six-cylinder four-stroke diesel engines for cruising, producing a total of 9,000 metric horsepower (6,620 kW; 8,880 shp) for use while surfaced, two Siemens-Schuckert 2 GU 345/34 double-acting electric motors producing a total of 1,000 shaft horsepower (1,010 PS; 750 kW) for use while submerged. She had two shafts and two 1.85 m (6 ft) propellers. The boat was capable of operating at depths of up to 200 metres (660 ft).

The submarine had a maximum surface speed of 20.8 knots (38.5 km/h; 23.9 mph) and a maximum submerged speed of 6.9 knots (12.8 km/h; 7.9 mph). When submerged, the boat could operate for 121 nautical miles (224 km; 139 mi) at 2 knots (3.7 km/h; 2.3 mph); when surfaced, she could travel 12,750 nautical miles (23,610 km; 14,670 mi) at 10 knots (19 km/h; 12 mph). U-198 was fitted with six 53.3 cm (21 in) torpedo tubes (four fitted at the bow and two at the stern), 24 torpedoes, one 10.5 cm (4.13 in) SK C/32 naval gun, 150 rounds, and a 3.7 cm (1.5 in) SK C/30 with 2575 rounds as well as one 2 cm (0.79 in) C/30 anti-aircraft guns with 8100 rounds. The boat had a complement of fifty-five.

== Service history ==
=== First patrol ===
U-198 began her first active war patrol on 9 March 1943, departing Kiel under the command of Fregattenkapitän Werner Hartmann. The new submarine headed south around South Africa to hunt the waters between Madagascar and the African mainland.

Her first taste of combat arrived on 5 April 1943 northeast of the Cape Verde Islands. At 18.10 hours, the submarine was sighted and attacked by a British Short Sunderland flying boat with eight depth charges. One of them bounced off the stern without detonating. At 20.40 hours, the same aircraft attacked again with four more depth charges. U-198 escaped unharmed.

A little over two months after departing Kiel, U-198 scored her first success of the war, torpedoing and sinking the 4,392 GRT British steam merchant ship Northmoor northeast of Durban on 17 May. Two anti-submarine trawlers and an escorting aircraft retaliated furiously, dropping about 55 depth charges but U-198 escaped without damage. Two days later, the submarine was spotted and attacked by a British PBY Catalina aircraft. The U-boat was not damaged, but effective anti-aircraft fire hit the flying boat, forcing it to return to base on one engine.

==== POWs ====
On the evening of 29 May 1943, U-198 torpedoed the unescorted British motor merchantman Hopetarn about 450 nmi (830 km; 520 mi) east of Durban. 37 souls survived this attack, although the second officer was taken prisoner by the submarine crew. At the end of the patrol he was sent to the POW camp at Milag Nord.

While tracking a small convoy on 31 May, U-198 was sighted by the escorts. Attacks from one of the corvettes drove the submarine deep but caused no serious damage. A little while later, the submarine drove off an approaching British Catalina with gunfire and then crash-dived to escape, losing the convoy in the process.

The morning of 5 June 1943 found U-198 stalking her next victim, the unescorted British motor merchant vessel Dumra. Two torpedoes at 07.50 hours destroyed the merchant ship's bow, but she remained afloat. A coup de grâce ten minutes later hit amidships, causing her to sink immediately. This final torpedo killed the ship's master (who was blown overboard by the blast) and 24 men in a lifeboat that had already abandoned the sinking freighter. The chief engineer, Henry Townsend Graham, was taken prisoner.

At 13.18 hours the U-boat hit the American Liberty Ship William King with one of two torpedoes as she traveled on a zig-zag course about 200 nmi (370 km; 230 mi) east of Durban. A coup de grâce about 45 minutes later caused her to sink by the stern in about ten minutes. After questioning the survivors, the ship's master (Owen Harvey Reed) was taken prisoner. He and the chief engineer of Dumra were transferred to the German supply ship Charlotte Schliemann and handed over to the Japanese at Batavia (in modern Indonesia) in August. Both men died in captivity on 18 September 1944 when the Japanese hell ship that was transporting them, Junyo Maru, was sunk by the British submarine HMS Tradewind.

A month passed before U-198 encountered her next victim, the 4,476 GRT Greek steam merchantman Hydraios. A single torpedo followed by a coup de grâce fifteen minutes later sealed her fate. All 40 men aboard survived, although after questioning the survivors, the Germans confiscated the ship's papers and a cashbox containing 682 Egyptian pounds.

Early the next day, U-198 located the British steam merchantman Leana. The submarine shelled the vessel with 147 rounds from her deck gun before finishing the job with a coup de grâce torpedo a little over an hour after the shelling began. Two men were killed by the submarine's gunfire, the master, (Joseph Crosthwaite), was taken prisoner. When the patrol ended, he was sent to Milag Nord.

The final kill of this patrol occurred on 1 August 1943. U-198 fired two torpedoes at the Dutch steam merchant vessel Mangkalihat which was traveling with convy BC-2, transporting a cargo of copper, sisal and tobacco. The first two shots missed so the U-boat fired her last torpedo at 18.51 hours, scoring a hit that eventually sank the ship (she foundered on 4 August while under tow). U-198 turned for home and terminated this highly successful patrol at Bordeaux on 24 September 1943.

=== Second Patrol ===
Oberleutnant zur See Burkhard Heusinger von Waldegg took command on 21 January 1944 and the submarine was transferred from Bordeaux to La Pallice. U-198 began her second and final patrol on 20 April 1944, sailing again around South Africa and into the Indian Ocean. En route, she was attacked by two Ventura patrol aircraft. Effective anti-aircraft fire drove the attackers off; U-198 received only slight damage in return and continued south to her assigned patrol area.

16 June brought the U-boat crew their first success of the patrol. The unescorted South African steam merchant ship Columbine was hit on the port side by one torpedo. The crew began to abandon ship and were still in the process of doing so when a coup de grâce struck eight minutes after the first hit, causing the ship to sink very rapidly. 23 men died, including the ship's master.

About a month later, on 15 July, U-198 torpedoed the British steam merchant vessel Director in the Mozambique channel (between the African mainland and Madagascar). One man died, the remaining 56 were picked up by the Portuguese sloop Gonçalves Zarco. On 19 July, U-198 fired torpedoes at an unidentified freighter and was counter-attacked by an escorting corvette. The torpedoes missed and no damage was suffered from depth charges.

Ranging farther up the east coast of Africa, U-198 sighted convoy DKA-21 on 6 August 1944 and attacked, sinking the 7,295 GRT British motor merchant vessel Empire City east of Mocímboa da Praia, Portuguese East Africa (now Mozambique). Two crew (Engineers) were lost from a total complement of 70. The following day, U-198 scored her final kill, sinking the British motor merchantman Empire Day. All 43 crew and gunners managed to abandon the sinking ship, however the U-boat crew took the chief officer of the ship, Robert Courteney Selfe, prisoner. The remaining crew landed safely on the island of Zanzibar.

=== Loss ===
On 12 August 1944, U-198 was depth charged and sunk by the British frigate HMS Findhorn and the Indian Black Swan-class sloop HMIS Godavari in position 03°35′S 52°49′E (near the Seychelles). The entire crew of the submarine was killed, as well as the first officer of Empire Day, a total of 66 men.

== Summary of raiding history ==
U-198 successes
Date	Name	Nationality	GRT	Fate
17 May 1943	Northmoor	Merchant Navy	4,392	Sunk
29 May 1943	Hopetarn	Merchant Navy	5,231	Sunk
5 June 1943	Dumra	Merchant Navy	2,304	Sunk
6 June 1943	William King	United States	7,176	Sunk
6 July 1943	Hydraios	Greece	4,476	Sunk
7 July 1943	Leana	Merchant Navy	4,742	Sunk
1 August 1943	Mangkalihat	Netherlands	8,457	Sunk
16 June 1944	Columbine	South Africa	3,268	Sunk
15 July 1944	Director	Merchant Navy	5,107	Sunk
6 August 1944	Empire City	Merchant Navy	7,295	Sunk
7 August 1944	Empire Day	Merchant Navy	7,242	Sunk

== Bibliography ==
- Gröner, Erich; Jung, Dieter; Maass, Martin (1991). U-boats and Mine Warfare Vessels. German Warships 1815–1945. Vol. 2. Translated by Thomas, Keith; Magowan, Rachel. London: Conway Maritime Press. ISBN 0-85177-593-4.
- Kemp, Paul (1999). U-Boats Destroyed - German Submarine Losses in the World Wars. London: Arms & Armour. ISBN 1-85409-515-3.
