= HMIS Godavari =

WW2-era Royal Indian Navy warship

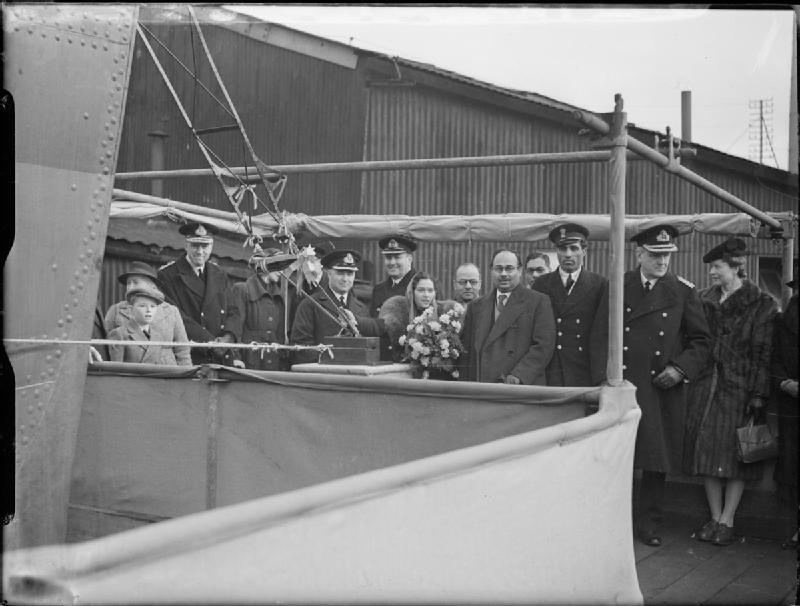
- HMIS GODAVARI launched at Southampton by Mrs Lall, the wife of the Deputy High Commissioner for India

History
- Name: Godavari
- Namesake: Godavari River
- Ordered: 29 August 1940
- Builder: Thornycroft
- Yard number: Yard 1386
- Laid down: 30 August 1941
- Launched: 21 March 1943
- Commissioned: 28 June 1943
- Out of service: 1948
- Honours and awards: Burma, 1945
- Fate: Transferred to Pakistan, scrapped 1959
- Badge: Map of India and the Indian Ocean with a border of lotus; sea Blue, British territory Gold and Lotus proper

General characteristics
- Class & type: Black Swan-class sloop
- Displacement: 1,250 tons original; 1,350 tons modified
- Length: 299 ft 6 in (91.29 m)
- Beam: 37 ft 6 in (11.43 m) original; 38 ft 6 in (11.73 m) modified
- Draught: 11 ft (3.4 m)
- Propulsion: Geared turbines, 2 shafts: 3,600 hp (2.68 MW) (original); 4,300 hp (3.21 MW) (modified)
- Speed: 19 knots (35 km/h) (original); 20 knots (37 km/h) (modified)
- Range: 7,500 nmi (13,900 km) at 12 kn (22 km/h)
- Complement: 180 (original); 192 (modified)
- Armament: 6 × QF 4 in (102 mm) Mk XVI AA guns (3 × 2); 4 × 2-pounder AA pom-pom; 4 × 0.5-inch (12.7 mm) AA machine guns (original); 12 × 20 mm Oerlikon AA (6 × 2) (modified)

HMIS Godavari (U 52) was a Black Swan-class sloop which served in the Royal Indian Navy (RIN) during World War II.

Godavari was transferred to Pakistan in 1948 after the Partition of India and eventually renamed PNS Sind.

== Operational service ==
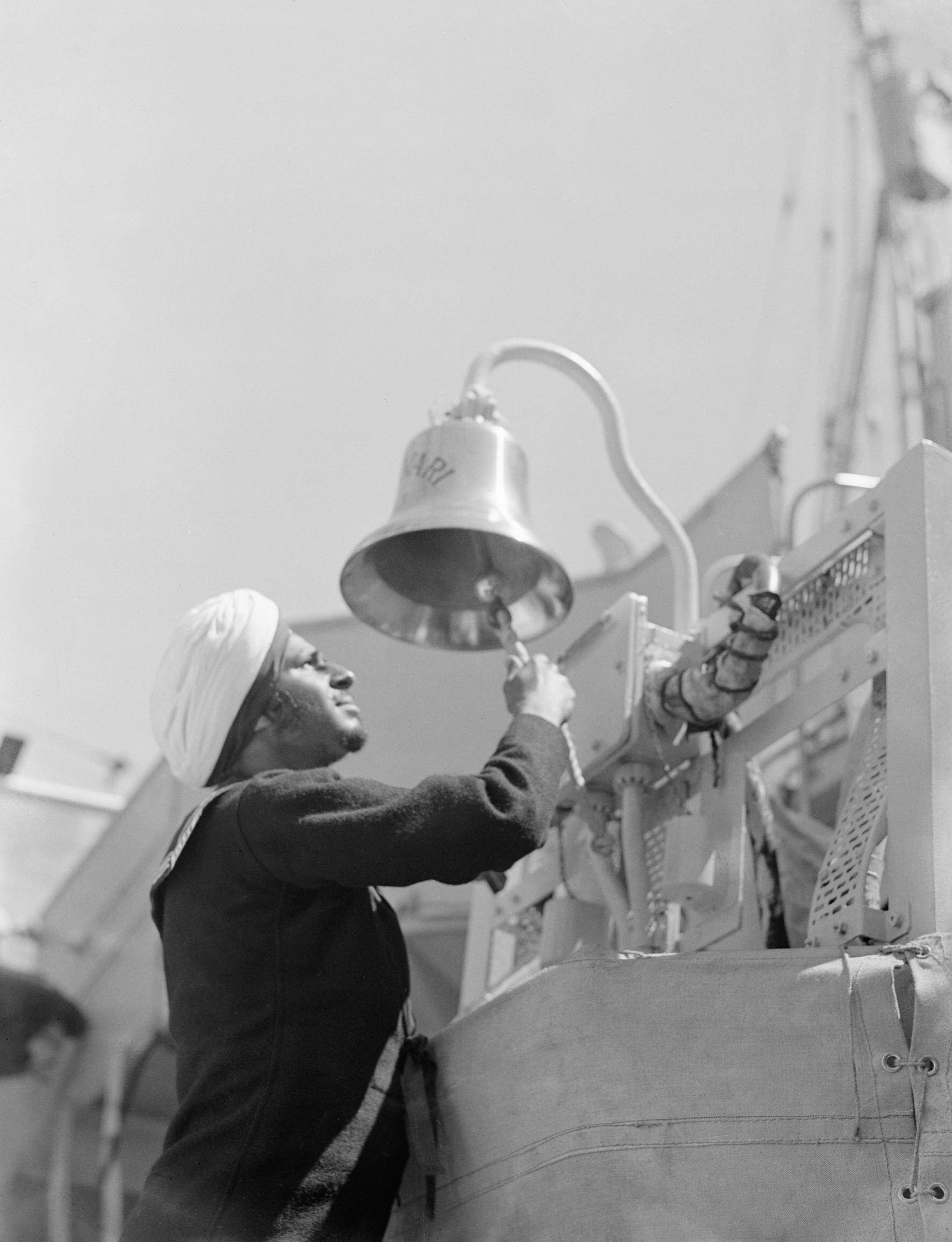
Leading Seaman Harjit Singh striking the bell of Godavari on commissioning at Woolston, Southampton, 22 June 1943 (IWM A17517)

On 29 August 1940, the Indian Government placed an order for two sloops, HMIS Godavari and HMIS Narbada with John I. Thornycroft & Company. Godavari was laid down as Yard number 1386 at Thonycroft's Woolston, Southampton shipyard on 31 October 1940, launched on 21 January 1943 and completed on 28 June 1943. Following commissioning she was sent to Scapa Flow for trials and working up. She was deployed in home waters for convoy defence on the UK-Gibraltar route. On 22 December 1943 she was involved in a collision with the SS Manchester Progress and was sent for repair in Londonderry.

On completion of repairs in February 1944 Godavari was nominated for transfer to the Eastern Fleet and convoy defence in the Indian Ocean, where she arrived in April 1944.

On 12 August the German submarine U-198 was sunk near the Seychelles, in position 03º35'S, 52º49'E, by depth charges from the British frigate HMS Findhorn (under the command of Lt.Cdr. J.C. Dawson, RD, RNR) and Godavari (under the command of A/Cdr. A.B. Goord, RIN).

Between January and March 1945 she was nominated for support of military operations in Burma. In August she was also nominated for support of the allied landings in Japan as part of Operation Zipper, however this operation was cancelled following the dropping of the atomic bombs and Japan's subsequent surrender.

Her commanding officers in the Royal Indian Navy were:

- From 22 Jun 1943 to 10 May 1944: A/Capt. James Wilfred Jefford OBE, RIN
- From 10 May 1944 to 10 Feb 1945: A/Cdr. Anthony Brian Goord, RIN
- From 10 Feb 1945 to 1948: A/Lt.Cdr. Hajee Mohammed Siddiq Choudry, MBE, RIN

== Post war ==
After the Independence of India and the subsequent Partition, she was among the vessels transferred to Pakistan, where she was renamed PNS Sind.
