= Sultan Abdul Halim Ferry Terminal =

Ferry terminal in Butterworth, Penang, Malaysia

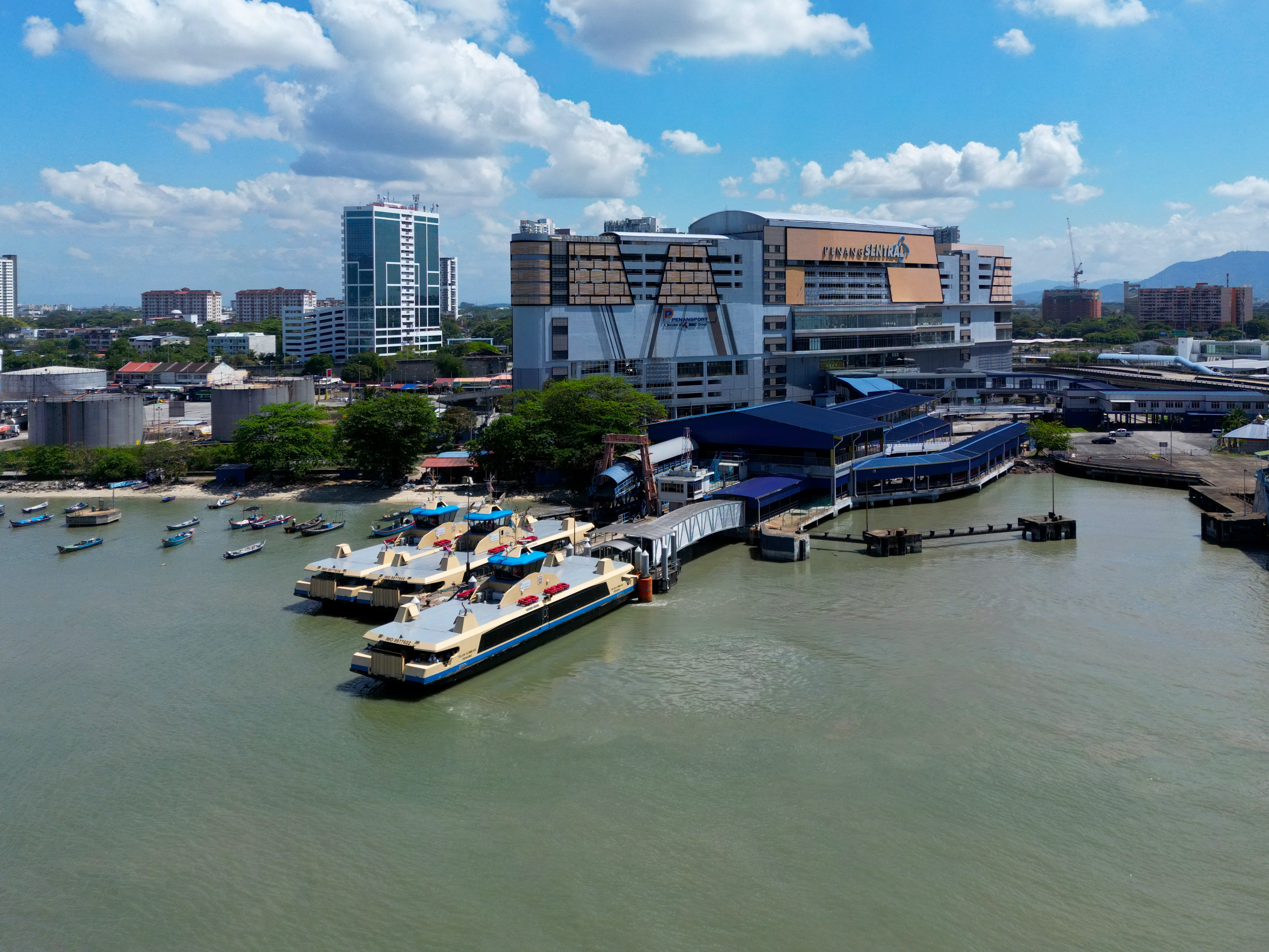

General information
- Type: Ferry slip
- Location: 12000 Butterworth, Penang, Malaysia, Butterworth, Penang, Malaysia
- Coordinates: 5.394692°N 100.363966°E
- Owner: Prasarana Malaysia

The Sultan Abdul Halim Ferry Terminal is a ferry slip within Seberang Perai in the Malaysian state of Penang. Situated at Butterworth, this docking facility is used for the state's ferry service between the city and George Town, which lies across the Penang Strait.

In addition to ferry services, the ferry terminal is located adjacent to both Penang Sentral and the Butterworth railway station. This allows ferry commuters to choose between bus and train transportation modes to various destinations within the city, as well as Peninsular Malaysia, Singapore and Thailand.

== History ==
The Sultan Abdul Halim Ferry Terminal was constructed to replace Mitchell's Pier, which had been built at the start of the 20th century. In the past, Mitchell's Pier was the landing point for the cross-strait ferries that linked Butterworth with George Town.

The present-day ferry terminal was named after the then Sultan of neighbouring Kedah, Sultan Abdul Halim. He was also twice elected as the King of Malaysia (Malay: Yang di-Pertuan Agong) - between 1970 and 1975, and between 2011 and 2016.

In 1988, the Sultan Abdul Halim Ferry Terminal suffered structural failure due to overloading and collapsed, claiming the lives of 32 people.

== See also ==
- Penang ferry service
- George Town Ferry Terminal
- Raja Tun Uda Ferry Terminal
