= Penang (restaurant chain) =

Penang Malaysian & Thai Cuisine
- Company type: Private
- Founder: Suan Lee "Stanley" Cheah; June Cheah
- Headquarters: United States
- Products: Malaysian cuisine Thai cuisine
- Website: penangphilly.com

Penang Malaysian & Thai Cuisine, formerly Penang Malaysian Cuisine, is a Malaysian and Thai themed restaurant chain in the United States founded by Suan Lee "Stanley" Cheah and his wife June.

== History ==
In 1996, Stanley Cheah opened three restaurants under the name "Penang" in New York City. The first restaurant was opened in Flushing, Queens. Penang Bar and Grill was opened by Stanley Cheah's estranged brother Michael and is not connected to Stanley's Penang chain. Cheah opened three more restaurants in 1997 and another three in 1998.

In December 1996, Penang opened its first location outside of New York in Massachusetts on "Washington Street, in Boston". This was the fourth location. Cheah opened this location after he "saw opportunity in Boston's Chinatown". By 1998, two more locations were scheduled to be opened. The restaurant had a menu which contain 150 items. The restaurant also focuses on Indian and Chinese cuisine.

In 2001, the chain opened a location in Bethesda, Maryland. The location is owned by family member Kevin Cheah. In 2014, the Bethesda location underwent $60,000 in innovations and was closed for several weeks. By 2002, Penang had opened eight locations, the Washington location, "at 19th and M streets, is in a prominent restaurant neighborhood. Penang's decor includes mahogany woodwork, metal accents and dramatic lighting".

Ruth Reichl of The New York Times describe the Malaysian restaurant in Flushing as "wonderfully authentic". A popular menu item is the roti canai. In 2008, a location opened in Lodi, New Jersey. As of October 2015, all of Penang's restaurant chains in New York City, including the original location in Flushing, had closed down due to the rising cost of rent. The location in Lodi closed down in 2017. There are locations this restaurant chain still operates including three in New Jersey, one in Philadelphia, one in Maryland, one in Arlington Heights, Illinois and others across the United States.

== See also ==
- Penang
