= Raja Tun Uda Ferry Terminal =

Ferry terminal in George Town, Penang, Malaysia

General information
- Type: Ferry slip
- Location: Weld Quay, 10300 George Town, Penang, Malaysia, George Town, Penang, Malaysia
- Coordinates: 5.41376°N 100.343025°E
- Owner: Penang Port Sdn Bhd

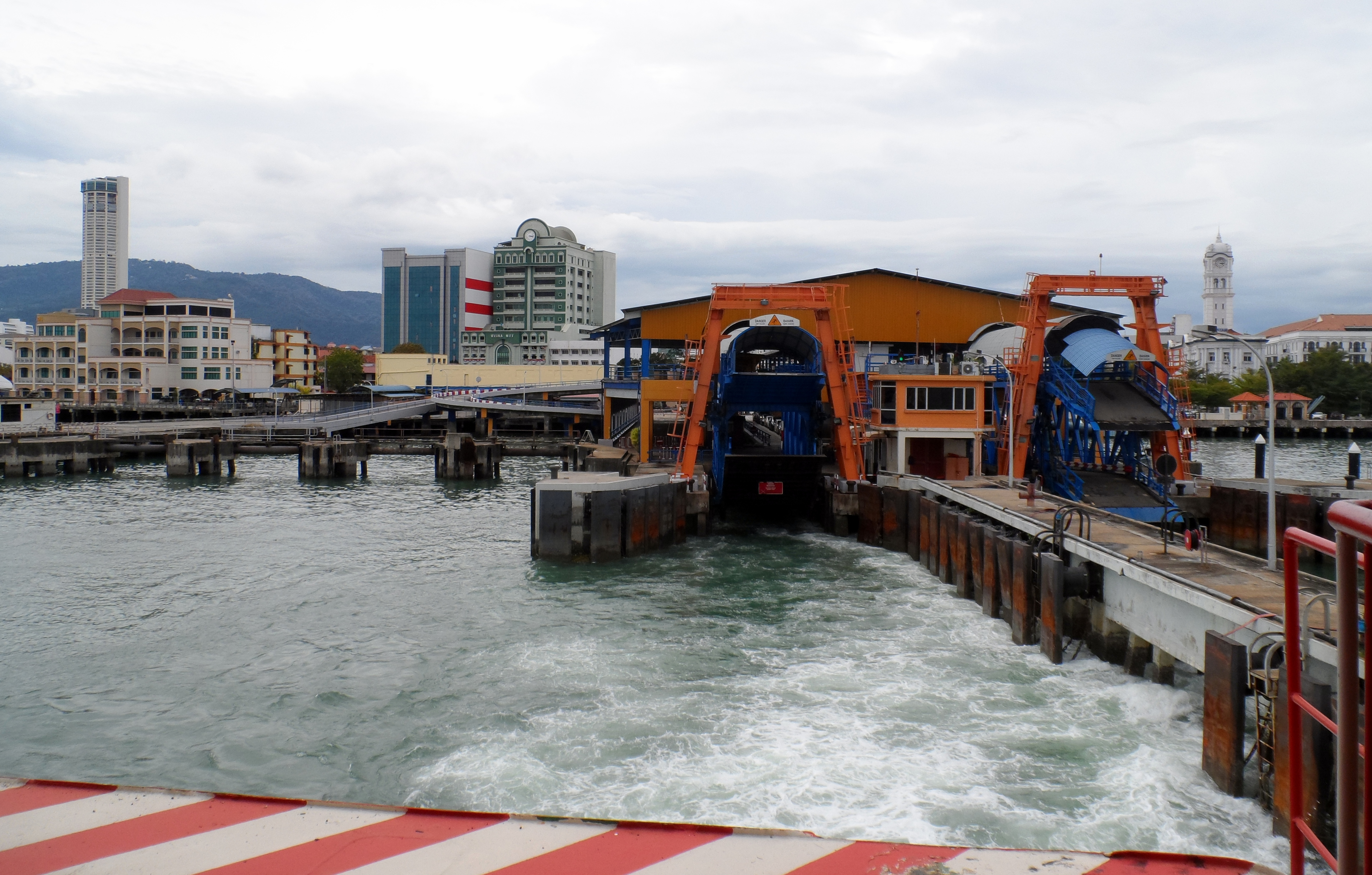
Terminal view from the ferry

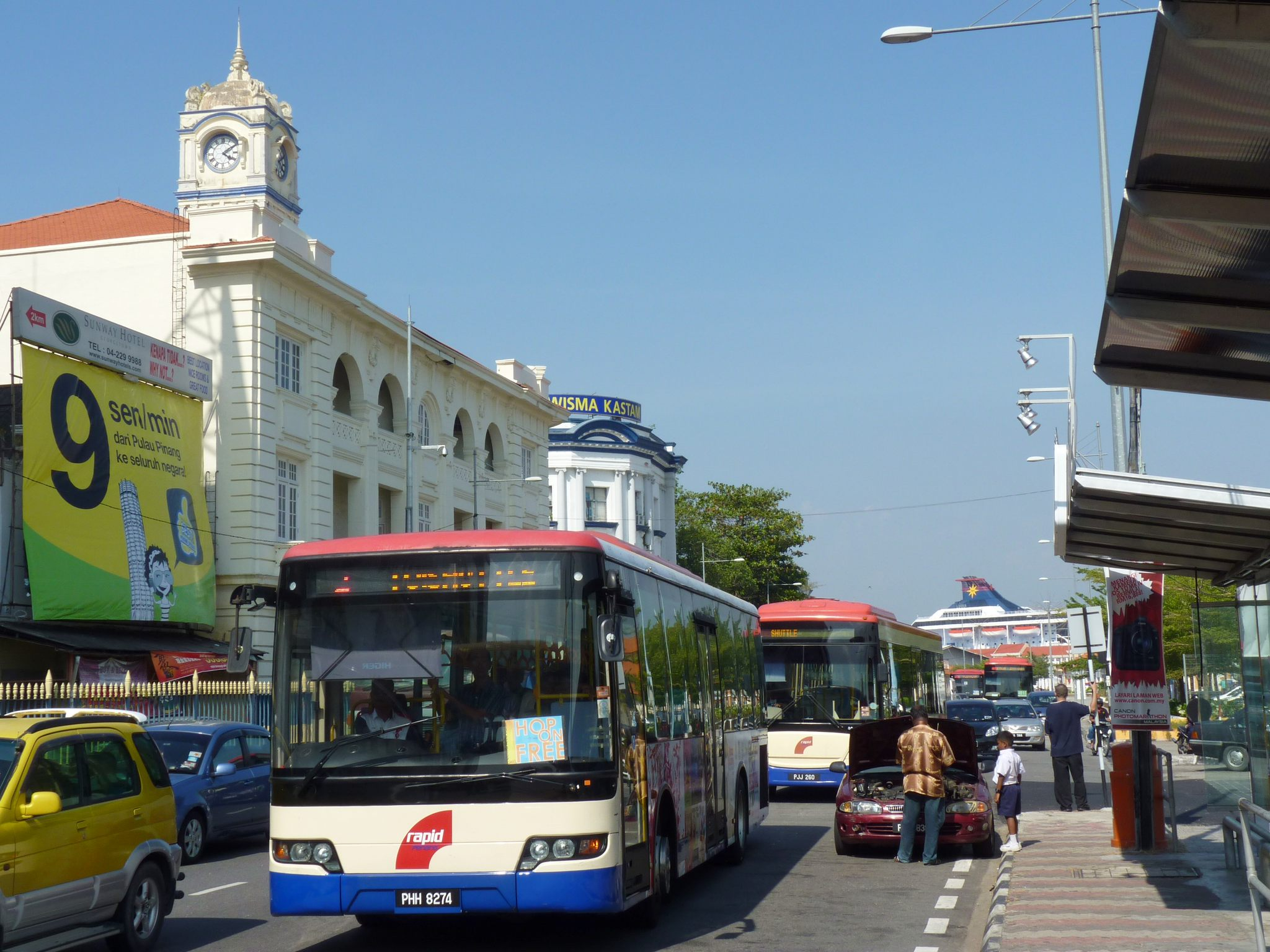
Rapid Penang buses serving the Raja Tun Uda Ferry Terminal

The Raja Tun Uda Ferry Terminal is a ferry slip within the city of George Town in the Malaysian state of Penang. Situated at Weld Quay in the city centre, this docking facility is used for the state's ferry service between George Town and Seberang Perai on the Malay Peninsula. The ferry terminal was completed in the 1960s.

In addition to ferry services, the ferry terminal is located adjacent to the Weld Quay Bus Terminal, thus allowing ferry commuters to take Rapid Penang public buses to various destinations within the city.

== History ==
In 1901, the FMSR (Federated Malay States Railways) Jetty was completed at the site where the Raja Tun Uda Ferry Terminal now stands. Measuring 644 m (2,113 ft), it was the longest jetty along Weld Quay at the time. Ferry steamers that carried train passengers from Butterworth into George Town (and vice versa) would dock at the jetty.

The FMSR Jetty was eventually replaced by the present-day Raja Tun Uda Ferry Terminal in the 1960s. The Raja Tun Uda Ferry Terminal was named after Raja Uda bin Raja Muhammad, who became the first Governor (Malay: Yang di-Pertua Negeri) of Penang after the independence of Malaya in 1957.

The ferry terminal is formally run by Prasarana Malaysia with corporate entity as Rapid Ferry until 2021 when Penang Port took over the administration of the ferry.

== See also ==
- Sultan Abdul Halim Ferry Terminal
