= Penang Port Commission =

Federal statutory body in the Malaysian state of Penang

- Suruhanjaya Pelabuhan Pulau Pinang
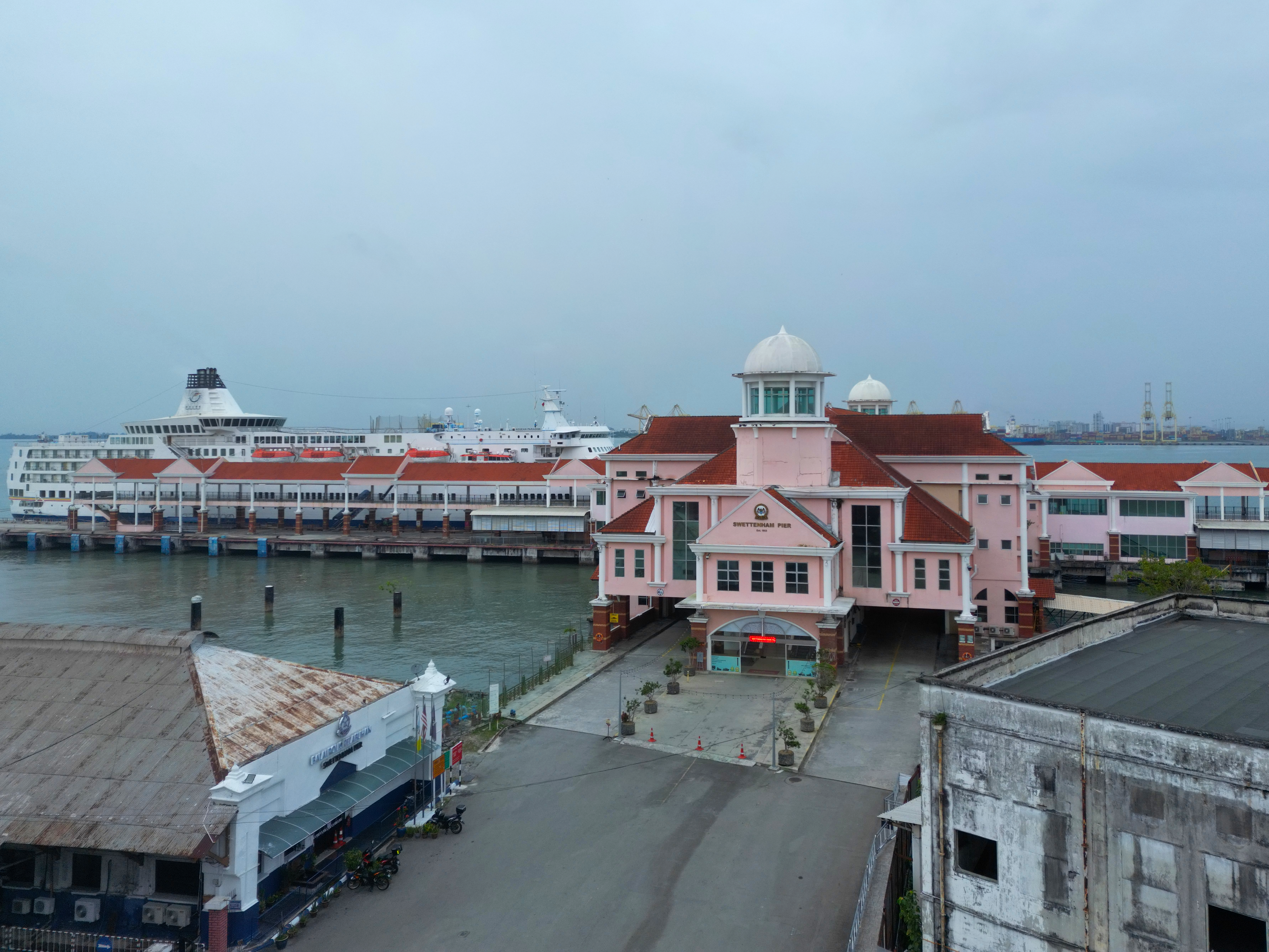
- Headquarters in George Town, Penang

Agency overview
- Formed: 1 January 1956; 70 years ago
- Type: Statutory body
- Jurisdiction: Malaysian federal government
- Headquarters: Swettenham Pier Cruise Terminal, King Edward Place, George Town, Penang, Malaysia
- Agency executives: Yeoh Soon Hin, Chairman; Vijayaindiaran R.Viswalingam, General manager
- Website: www.penangport.gov.my/en/

The Penang Port Commission (abbrev. PPC) is a statutory body under the Ministry of Transport of the Malaysian federal government. Established in 1956, it serves as the port authority for the Port of Penang, which includes Swettenham Pier in George Town.

== History ==
In 1912, the Straits Settlements Legislative Council passed Ordinance No. V, which mandated the formation of port authorities in Penang and Singapore. The ordinance received royal assent the following year. Harbour boards for both Penang and Singapore were officially established on 1 July 1913. Engineer John Rumney Nicholson was appointed as the first chairman of the boards, which were structured as corporate entities responsible for the collection of revenues owed to the British Crown, as well as managing sinking funds for seaport development, interest payments and future loans. In 1924, the Penang Harbour Board (PHB) acquired the cross-strait ferry service between George Town and Province Wellesley (now Seberang Perai).

After World War II, maritime trade in British Malaya rebounded, causing increased congestion at seaports. In response, the new Malayan federal government formed the Federal Ports Committee to evaluate seaport operations. Port consultant E. A. Lewis advised the federal government to create a port commission that would include representatives from the federal and Penang governments, the municipalities of George Town and Butterworth, the Malayan Railway and the private sector. The commission was to serve as the new port authority for the Port of Penang and assume ownership of all assets belonging to the PHB, along with the Malayan Railway facilities at Perai.

By the end of 1955, the Federal Legislative Council enacted the Penang Port Commission (PPC) Ordinance. This allowed for the establishment of the PPC on 1 January 1956. The PPC was headed by a chairman appointed by the Malayan King, a general manager, and between five and seven federal appointees. It took control of the PHC's assets and the Malayan Railway port infrastructure at Perai, in addition to managing the ferry service and overseeing future seaport developments. Upon the PPC's establishment, James Wilfred Jefford, the former Commander-in-Chief of the Pakistan Navy, was appointed as its first chairman.

The ordinance was amended twice by the federal Parliament, first in 1959 and again in 1974. The 1974 amendment increased the number of federal appointees to a maximum of nine.

=== Privatisation ===
Following the privatisation of the PPC, in 1994, Penang Port Sdn Bhd (PPSB), a government-linked company under the Minister of Finance (Incorporated), became the licensed port operator of the Port of Penang. Under the Ports Privatisation Act 1990 (PPA), PPSB took over the management of daily port operations, including cargo handling and marine services, as well as the ferry service and cruise arrivals at Swettenham Pier. The PPC retains its regulatory role as the port authority of the Port of Penang. In 2014, PPSB was acquired by Seaport Terminal (Johore), owned by Syed Mokhtar Albukhary. In 2017, PPSB was sold to MMC Corporation, which was also majority-owned by Syed Mokhtar.

The privatisation of the PPC was met with substantial criticism from the Pakatan Rakyat and later Pakatan Harapan state administrations. Concerns arose that Seaport Terminal's control would reduce the Port of Penang to a feeder for Johor's seaports. Seaport Terminal's proposed dredging of the Penang Strait did not materialise, with analysts speculating that the project was taken over by MMC instead.

== See also ==
- Maritime and Port Authority of Singapore
- Port Klang Authority
