= Economy of Penang =

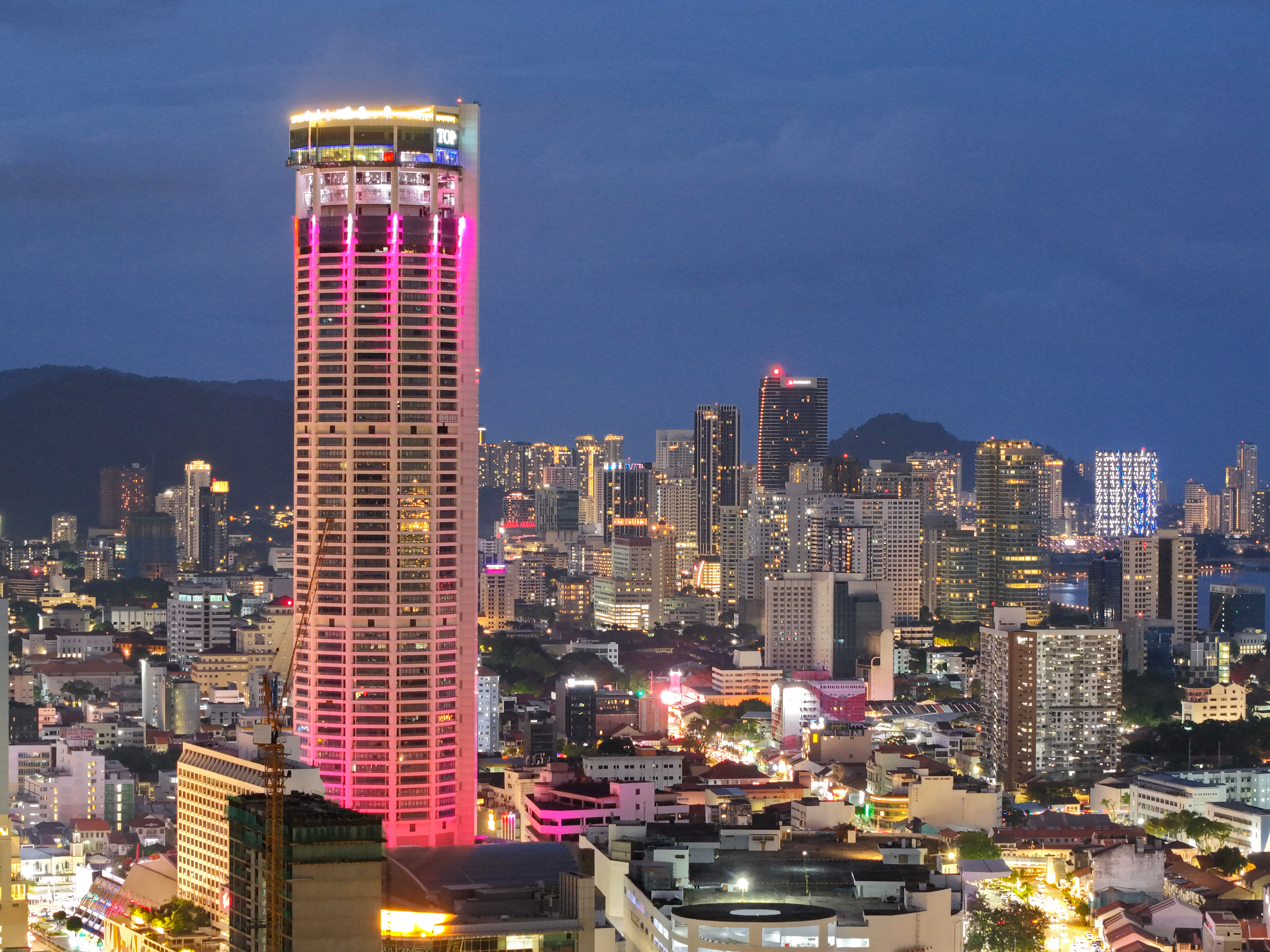
- Skyline of George Town's Central Business District
- Currency: Malaysian ringgit (MYR)

Statistics
- Population: ▲1,740,405 (2020)
- GDP: ▲$24.567 billion (nominal; 2023); ▲$89.925 billion (PPP; 2023)
- GDP rank: 5th out of 13 states in Malaysia (including two federal territories)
- GDP growth: ▲3.3% (2023)
- GDP per capita: ▲$15,918 (2023)
- GDP per capita rank: 3rd out of 13 states in Malaysia (including two federal territories)
- GDP by sector: Services: 48.0%; Manufacturing: 46.5%; Construction: 2.9%; Agriculture: 1.9%; Mining: 0.1%; (2023)
- Inflation (CPI): 2.3% (2023)
- Population below national poverty line: N/A
- Gini coefficient: ▲0.371 (2022)
- Human Development Index: ▲0.839 very high (4th) (2023)
- Labour force: ▲926,200 (2023); ▲71.3% employment rate (2023)
- Labour force by occupation: Services: 56.5%; Manufacturing: 35.6%; Construction: 6.1%; Agriculture: 1.8%; Mining: 0.04%; (2023); excludes non-residents
- Unemployment: ▼2.2% (2023)

External
- Exports: ▲$111 billion (2024)
- Export goods: Integrated circuitry; Electric and electronic products; Scientific equipment; Piezoelectric crystals; Telecommunications equipment
- Main export partners: United States 18.9%; China 15.6%; Singapore 14.8%; (2024)
- Imports: ▲$65.7 billion (2024)
- Import goods: Integrated circuitry; Piezoelectric crystals; Electric and electronic products; Machinery parts and accessories; Electrical apparatus and parts
- Main import partners: China 23.3%; Taiwan 19.7%; United States 12.6%; (2024)
- FDI stock: ▲$13.4 billion (2023)

Public finance
- Government debt: RM41.1 million (2022)
- Revenue: RM595.1 million (2022)
- Spending: RM755.0 million (2022)
- All values, unless otherwise stated, are in US dollars.

The economy of Penang is classified as a high-income economy and is the fifth largest in Malaysia by gross domestic product (GDP). In 2023, Penang contributed 7.6% of Malaysia’s GDP. The state had a GDP per capita of RM72,586 (US$15,918), the third highest in the country after Kuala Lumpur and Labuan, surpassing the World Bank’s threshold for high-income economies.

Despite being the second smallest Malaysian state by land mass, Penang is one of the country's most developed economic powerhouses. It has a tertiary-based economy primarily driven by services and manufacturing. Penang is known as a popular tourist attraction and has also been dubbed the Silicon Valley of the East due to its leading role as a destination for foreign direct investment, attracting hundreds of multinational corporations. Additionally, Penang is the top exporting state in the country.

== Overview ==
Penang's economy is largely propelled by the services and manufacturing sectors, with each constituting more than two-fifths of the state's GDP. It is the largest exporter in Malaysia, contributing nearly 33% of the country's exports in 2024. Export-oriented industrialisation has made electronics the backbone of Penang's industry, with integrated circuitry, piezoelectric crystals, scientific equipment, and other electric and electronic components forming the bulk of the state's exports. The Penang International Airport (PIA) handles the highest export volume in Malaysia.

Apart from its traditional strengths in tourism and finance, Penang has increasingly become a centre for health care, business events, ecotourism and cruise arrivals. Its industrial and business ecosystem have allowed it to serve as a hub for shared services and outsourcing (SSO), along with a growing startup community. The booming economy has also led to a considerable interest in real estate in Penang. As of 2023, the state's average salary increased to RM3,557 (US$859.18), making it the second highest among Malaysian states after Selangor.

Originally founded as an entrepôt by the British East India Company (EIC) in 1786, Penang suffered economically following the revocation of its capital George Town's free port status in 1969. This caused a change in governance and prompted a massive restructuring of the state's economy. Massive industrialisation and infrastructural developments played a crucial role in reversing Penang's economic decline and led to the state's rapid economic growth until the late 1990s.

== Macroeconomic statistics ==
The following table shows the main economic indicators between 2010 and 2023. Inflation below 5% is in green.

Year	GDP (RM million)	GDP (%)	GDP per capita (RM)	Inflation (%)	Unemployment (%)
2010	52,946	7.3	33,597	-	2.2
2011	55,827	7.2	35,527	▲3.3	1.8
2012	58,353	7.2	37,053	▲1.8	2.0
2013	61,324	7.2	38,490	▲2.1	1.7
2014	66,200	6.9	42,130	▲3.2	1.6
2015	78,146	6.2	44,847	▲2.4	1.6
2016	82,493	6.3	47,322	▲2.5	2.1
2017	86,767	6.2	49,873	▲4.0	2.1
2018	91,234	6.9	52,397	▲0.9	2.2
2019	94,645	6.9	55,243	▲1.1	2.0
2020	92,691	7.1	55,774	▲ -0.9	3.5
2021	99,111	7.3	59,685	▲2.2	3.6
2022	112,126	7.6	69,684	▲3.2	2.7
2023	115,957	7.6	72,586	▲2.3	2.2

GDP by cities (2015–2020)
Year	GDP (RM million)	
Year	George Town	Seberang Perai
2015	41,778	36,368
2016	44,279	38,214
2017	46,568	40,200
2018	49,005	42,229
2019	50,610	44,035
2020	49,842	42,849

== History ==
=== Colonial era ===
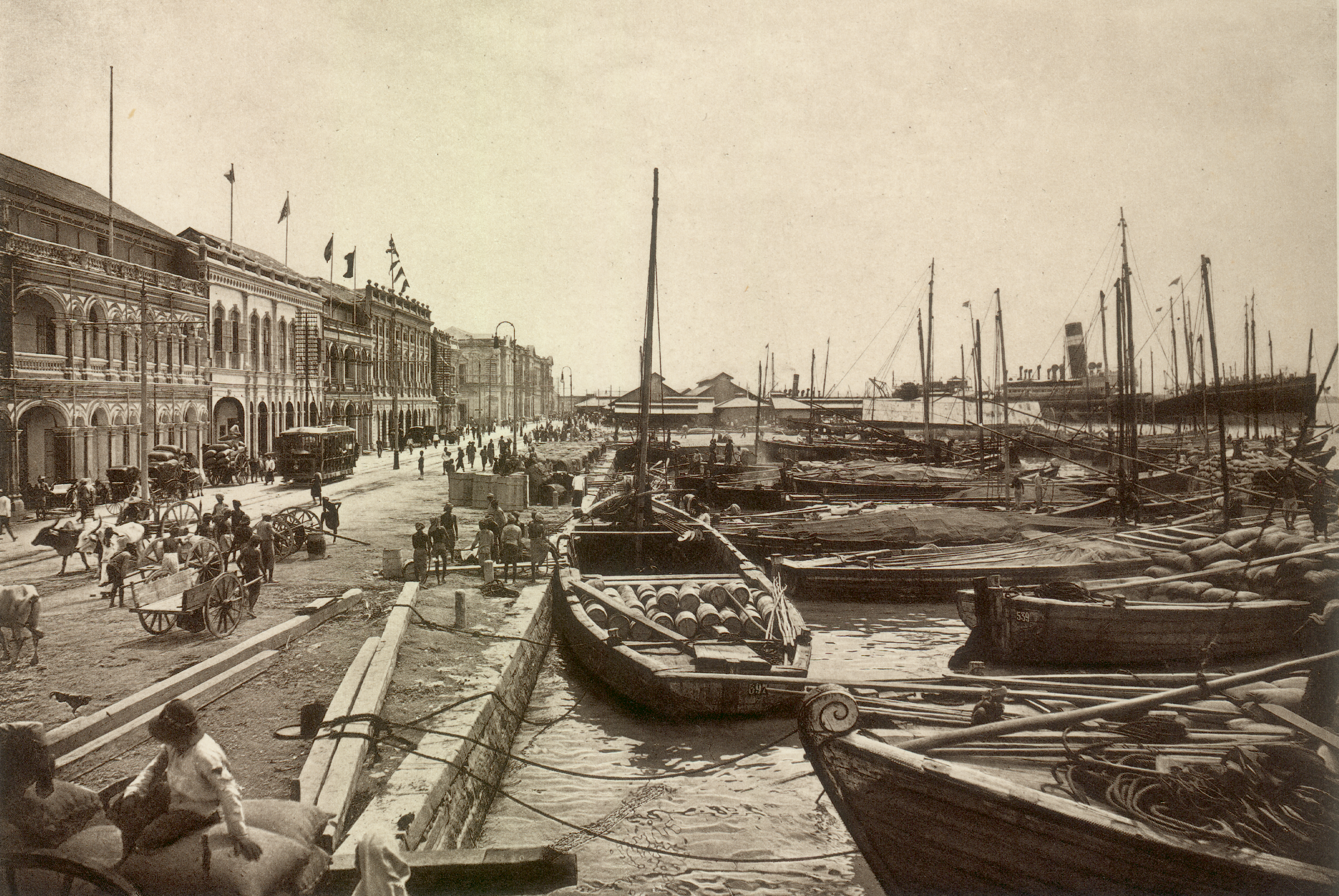
The Port of Penang in George Town c. 1910. Port functions were eventually relocated to mainland Seberang Perai in 1974.

The island city of George Town, the capital of Penang, was established by Francis Light as a free port in 1786. Situated near the northern end of the Strait of Malacca, Penang served as the first port of call for vessels from Europe and India. As Light intended, George Town grew rapidly as a conduit for spice trade, taking maritime commerce from Dutch posts in the region.

Following the founding of Singapore in 1819, George Town began to lose its prominence. By 1832, Singapore had replaced George Town as the capital of the Straits Settlements. Penang's location to the north limited its ability to attract more maritime trade beyond the Bay of Bengal, unlike Singapore, which was strategically positioned for China-bound trade. By 1863, George Town contributed 24% of the total trade volume of the Straits Settlements, second only to Singapore.

In spite of its secondary importance to Singapore, George Town remained a crucial feeder port. The opening of the Suez Canal in 1869 and a tin mining boom in the Malay Peninsula transformed the Port of Penang into a leading tin exporter. In the end of the 19th century, George Town became the primary financial centre of British Malaya, as mercantile firms and international banks opened along Beach Street. By 1910, Penang's annual export volume matched or even exceeded that of Singapore and by 1917, Penang contributed one-fifth of the tax revenue of the Straits Settlements.

In the years leading to Malaya's independence from Britain, British administrators dismantled the Straits Settlements and merged Penang into the nascent Malayan federation. This alarmed George Town's business elites, who feared that the merger would result in the loss of the city's free port status and increased federal interference in Penang's economic affairs. A secession movement was launched but ultimately dwindled due to British disapproval. Nonetheless, by 1957, Penang‘s economic status was said to have far outpaced the rest of Malaya, putting it on par with Singapore and Hong Kong.

=== Post-independence ===
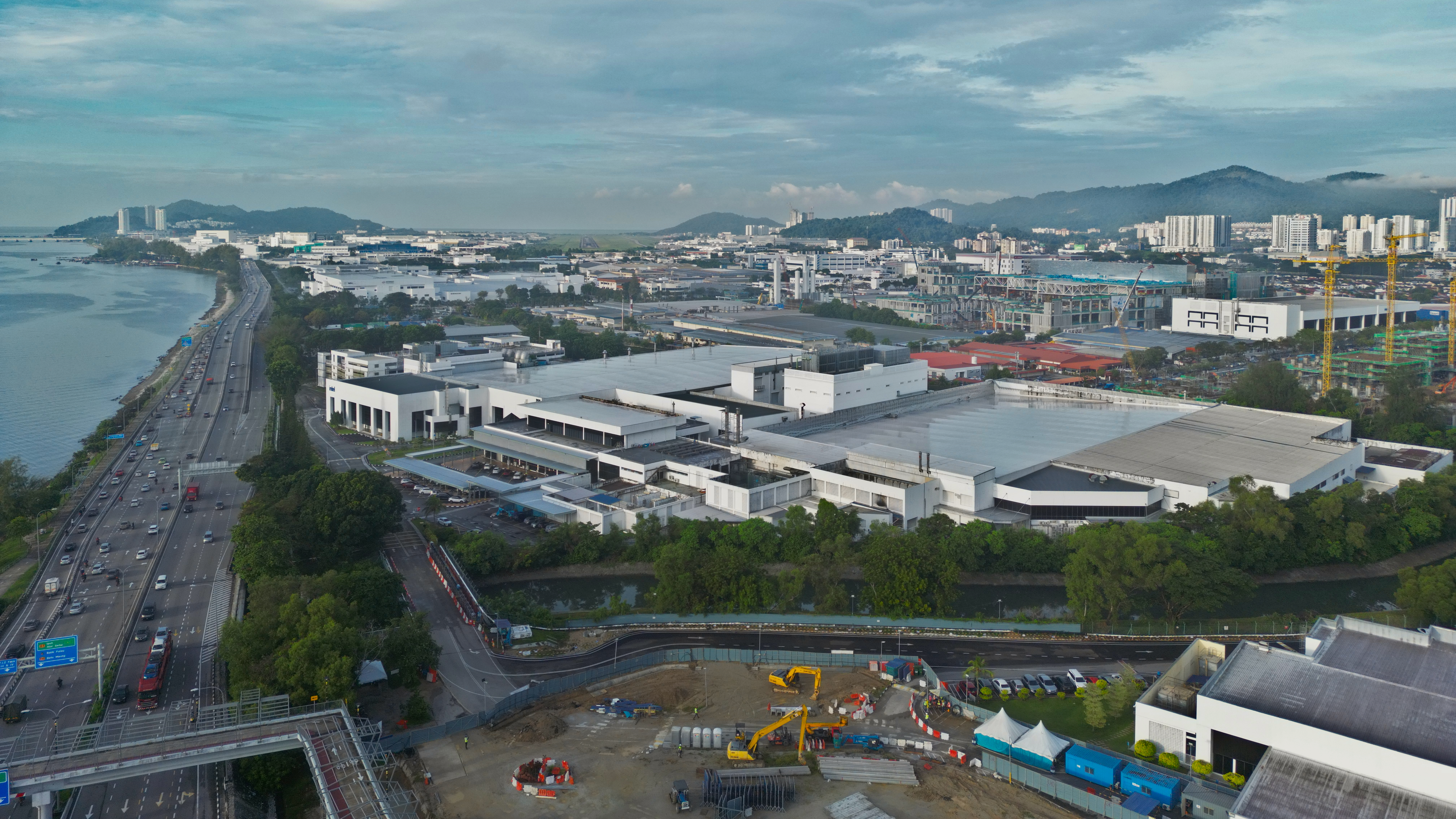
Bayan Lepas Free Industrial Zone, known as the Silicon Valley of the East, was the first designated free-trade zone in post-independence Malaysia and is now a major electronics manufacturing hub.

Following Malaya's independence, Penang's maritime trade continued to shrink, as neighbouring countries Burma, Indonesia and Thailand developed their port infrastructure. Meanwhile, the Malayan federal government began shifting its focus towards the development of Kuala Lumpur and nearby Port Klang. The decline in trade volume was also exacerbated by the Indonesia–Malaysia confrontation.

Penang's state government, which was under the control of the Alliance at the time, attempted import substitution industrialisation to counter the economic decline. New industries were set up in mainland Seberang Perai in 1964. However, most of these industries failed within a few years. By the late 1960s, Penang‘s per capital income was 12% lower than the national average, while unemployment rose to 9%. This triggered unrest and strikes among the population.

The period of relative prosperity vis-à-vis the rest of Malaysia came to an end in 1969, when the federal government revoked George Town's free port status. Unemployment and brain drain worsened, along with growing discontent with the Alliance-led state government. In the state election that year, opposition party Gerakan succeeded in seizing power from the Alliance.

Robert R. Nathan Associates was commissioned to formulate a master plan to revitalise Penang's economy. The resulting Nathan Report of 1970 recommended an export-led growth strategy and the strengthening of linkages with the global economy. It also foresaw the start of an international division of labour, at a time when the electronics industries in developed nations started seeking access to more cost-effective labour. The report recommended a shift in development strategy from Seberang Perai to Bayan Lepas, where the Penang International Airport is sited, to capitalise on readily-available logistics and a substantial labor force.

Newly-elected Chief Minister Lim Chong Eu implemented the report's recommendations by embarking on an export-oriented industrialisation strategy centred on the electronics industry as the main sector. Lim believed that the electronics industry would have less impact on Penang's role as a tourist destination. The Bayan Lepas Free Industrial Zone (Bayan Lepas FIZ) was established in 1972, followed by the Perai Free Industrial Zone (Perai FIZ) in 1980.

Although the Alliance retained federal power, the 1969 race riots in Kuala Lumpur forced the federal government, led by Abdul Razak Hussein, to introduce the New Economic Policy (NEP). The NEP's policies favouring ethnic Malays posed a challenge for the Chinese-dominated Penang state government. Malaysia's centralised power structure also made Penang susceptible to federal-state conflicts. Lim, however, was able to secure autonomy and freedom to implement economic reforms, by maintaining ties with Abdul Razak and ensuring order within Penang. In 1973, Gerakan joined the Alliance (renamed Barisan Nasional) to guarantee Penang's inclusion in national development policies.

The FIZs played a critical role in reviving Penang's economy and driving the state's economic growth in the late 20th century. By the mid-1980s, Penang, with its well-established electronics ecosystem, emerged as the world‘s largest exporter and the third largest assembler of semiconductors after the United States and Japan. Penang's rapid industrial growth propelled it to a "similar stage of technological development" vis-à-vis Singapore, leading to competition between the two territories for expertise. Industrialisation significantly contributed to the rise in Penang's GDP per capita and a substantial reduction in unemployment rates, ultimately resulting in a shortage of skilled labour. Between 1976 and 1990, Penang consistently achieved double-digit annual growth in GDP. Economic spillover to parts of neighbouring Kedah and Perak catalysed the growth of the George Town Conurbation, which became the second largest metropolitan economy in Malaysia after the Klang Valley by 2010.

In 1990, Koh Tsu Koon assumed the position of Chief Minister, succeeding Lim. Under Koh's tenure, the Penang Strategic Development Plan was introduced, aiming to enhance economic diversification by focusing on the expansion of higher-order service sectors such as finance, education, information technology and medical services. However, Penang's economy was adversely affected by the 1997 Asian financial crisis, precipitating a deceleration in the state's economic growth in the early 21st century.

In the 2008 state election, Pakatan Rakyat (now Pakatan Harapan) wrested power in Penang from the incumbent Barisan Nasional administration. Newly-elected Chief Minister Lim Guan Eng abolished the NEP within the state, initiated open tender for state projects, adopted a more business-friendly approach to investments and intensified efforts towards economic diversification. Penang has since witnessed an economic revitalisation, boosted by growth in the private sector. The state's economic resurgence, particularly since 2008, was described by Bloomberg as Malaysia's "biggest economic success", despite the federal government's focus on other states such as Johor and Sarawak.

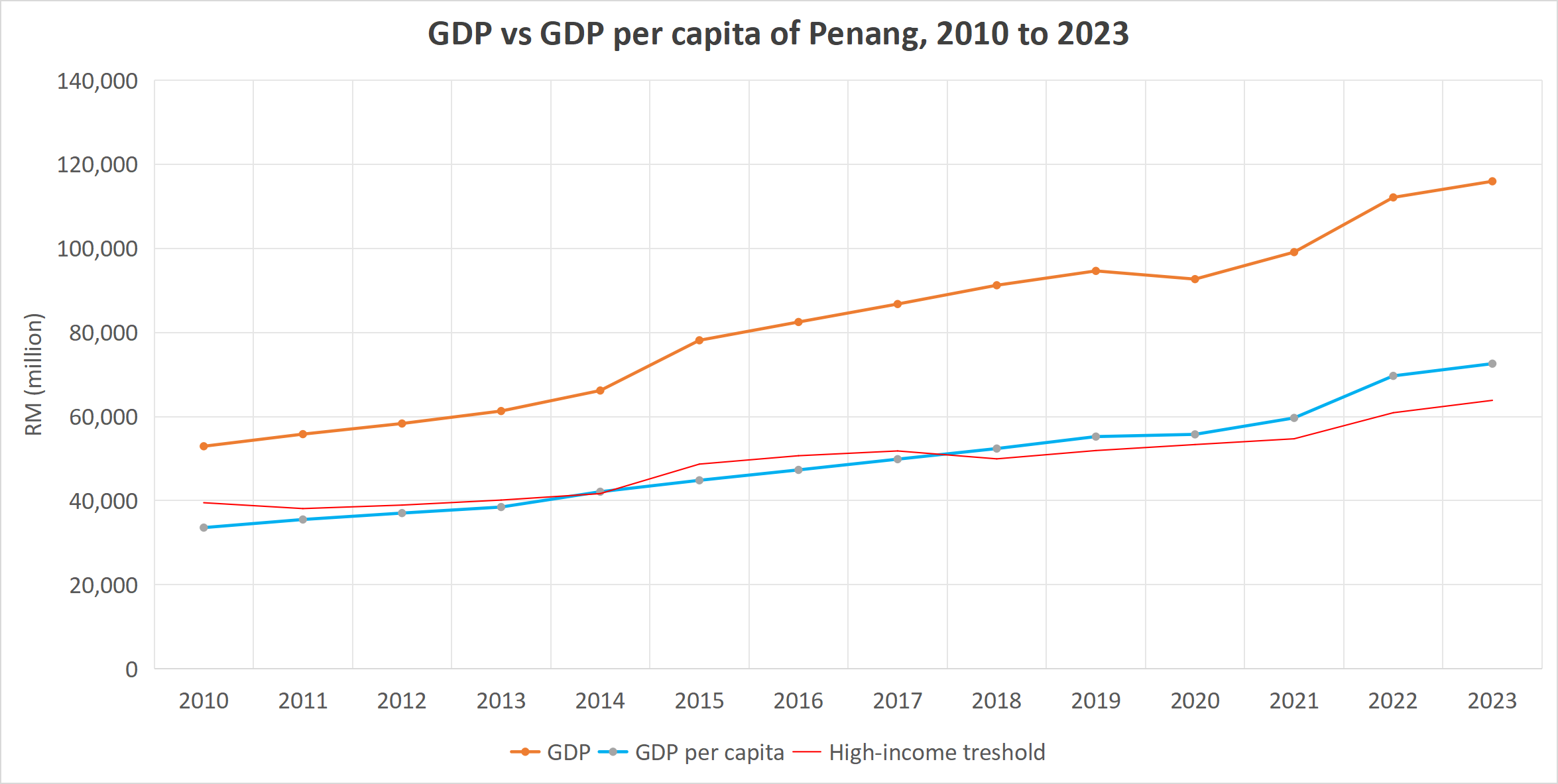
GDP and GDP per capita growth from 2010 to 2023

== Sectors ==
Economic sectors in Penang by GDP share (2023)
1. Services (48.0%)
2. Manufacturing (46.5%)
3. Construction (2.90%)
4. Agriculture (1.90%)
5. Mining (0.10%)

=== Manufacturing ===
The manufacturing sector contributed nearly 47% of Penang's GDP as of 2023. Penang has a total of 11 industrial parks, with two of them – the Bayan Lepas Free Industrial Zone (Bayan Lepas FIZ) and the Perai Free Industrial Zone (Perai FIZ) – designated as free-trade zones.

The Bayan Lepas FIZ is regarded as the Silicon Valley of the East, home to more than 300 multinational corporations (MNCs) including 39 Fortune 1000 companies. Among the MNCs within the zone are major technology firms such as AMD, Bosch, HP Inc., Intel, Motorola, Osram and Renesas. Manufacturing has cemented the state's position as Malaysia's leading exporter. In 2023 alone, integrated circuitry accounted for more than 44% of the state's total exports, followed by electric and electronic products, piezoelectric crystals, and scientific equipment. Penang's manufacturing sector drew in US$13.1 billion of foreign direct investments (FDI), accounting for almost 47% of Malaysia's total that year. According to Financial Times in 2024, Penang is well-positioned to benefit from the ongoing China–United States trade war, as restrictions prompt businesses to adopt the China Plus One strategy.

Aside from electronics and engineering manufacturing, Penang is Malaysia's main jewellery finishing hub, contributing 4/5 of the nation's gold and jewellery exports as of 2024. The state's gold and jewellery industry originates from the founding of the Penang Goldsmith Association in 1832. Jewellery from Penang is exported to over 20 foreign markets, including Singapore, Hong Kong, Japan, Canada and the United States.

=== Services ===
Services subsectors in Penang by GDP share (2023)
1. Wholesale and retail trade, accommodation, food and beverage (32.3%)
2. Utilities, transport, storage and communication (25.0%)
3. Finance, insurance, real estate and business services (18.7%)
4. Other services (10.9%)
5. Government services (13.1%)

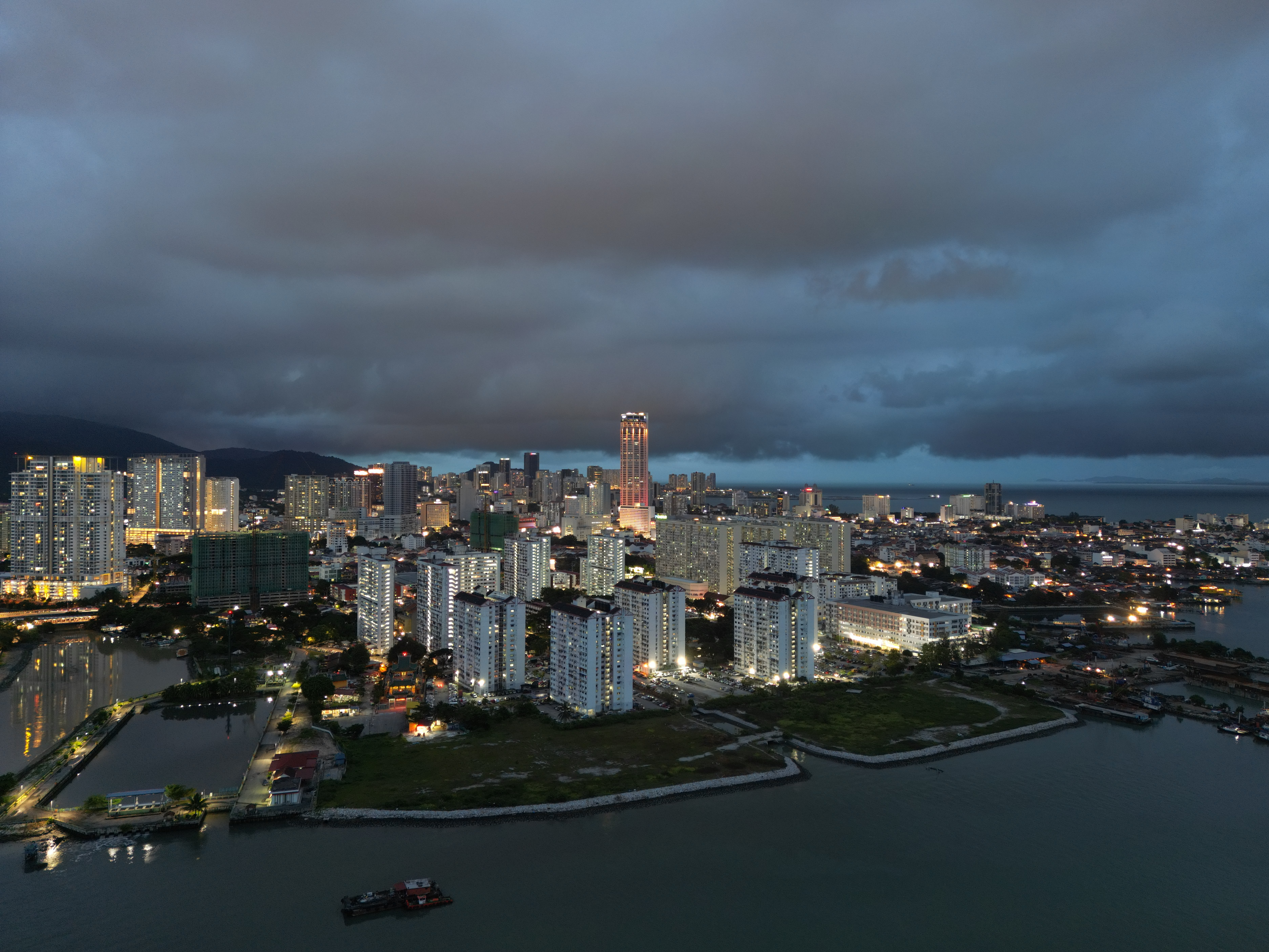
Skyline of the city centre of George Town

The services sector contributed 48% of Penang's GDP as of 2023 and employed almost 3/5 of the state's workforce. Major subsectors in the state include logistics, communications, retail, food and beverages (F&B), tourism, financial, real estate and business services.

George Town was formerly the financial centre of British Malaya. In the late 19th century, international banks such as Standard Chartered, HSBC, and the Royal Bank of Scotland established themselves in the city, leading to the clustering of mercantile trade around the northern end of Beach Street. Post-independence, George Town continues to function as the commercial hub of northern Malaysia. As of 2023, finance and ancillary services contributed 9% of Penang's GDP.

Penang is one of Malaysia's vital logistics hubs. The Penang International Airport (PIA) is the country's second busiest by aircraft movements and in 2023, handled RM365 billion (US$93 billion) worth of exports, the largest of all entry points nationwide. In 2024, the Port of Penang processed over 1.4 million TEUs of cargo, the third highest among Malaysia's seaports.

Traditionally one of Malaysia's most popular tourist destinations, Penang has attracted important people such as W. Somerset Maugham, Rudyard Kipling, Lee Kuan Yew, Queen Elizabeth II and King Charles III. The state is recognised for its architecture and cultural diversity, natural attractions, and its culinary scene. In 2017, Penang contributed close to RM3.9 million (US$0.94 million) of Malaysia's tourism tax revenue, the third highest after Kuala Lumpur and Sabah.

Economic diversification measures have led to Penang expanding its tourism offerings in areas such as health care, business events, ecotourism and cruise arrivals. The state has emerged as the leading destination in Malaysia for medical tourism, attracting over half of the medical tourist arrivals prior to the COVID-19 pandemic. George Town has also been identified as one of Malaysia's key destinations for business events, with the industry generating an economic impact of nearly RM1.3 billion (US$0.31 billion) throughout Penang in 2024. Among the major venues for business events in the state are Setia SPICE, Straits Quay and Prangin Mall.

The state's retail subsector employed as much as 15% of its workforce as of 2019. As the main shopping destination in northwestern Malaysia, Penang's retail scene includes shopping malls like Gurney Plaza, Gurney Paragon, 1st Avenue Mall, Straits Quay, Queensbay Mall, Sunshine Central and Design Village. Traditional shophouses and markets continue to thrive, specialising in local delicacies and produce such as nutmegs, Heong Peng and Tambun biscuits.

In 2004, the Bayan Lepas FIZ and the adjacent township of Bayan Baru were granted Multimedia Super Corridor Cyber City status, galvanising Penang's growth as a shared services and outsourcing (SSO) hub. By 2016, the state attracted the second largest share of investments for global business services (GBS) in the country after Kuala Lumpur, creating over 8,000 high-income jobs in the process. Newer office spaces at Bayan Baru have attracted multinational firms including Cisco, Citigroup, Clarivate, Swarovski and Teleperformance to open GBS offices at the area. In addition, Penang is home to a thriving startup community, driven by home-grown companies like Piktochart and DeliverEat.

=== Agriculture ===
As of 2017, agriculture made up nearly 44% of Seberang Perai's land use. Known as the "rice bowl" of Penang, the city had approximately 12,472 acres (5,047 ha) of paddy fields as of 2008. Despite limited land availability, Penang has consistently recorded the highest average rice yield in Malaysia since 2018, with a total yield of RM190.8 million in 2022.

Penang is the only state in Peninsular Malaysia that captures oceanic tuna, recording a yield of 2,277 t (2,241 long tons; 2,510 short tons) in 2017, the highest in the country. Tuna sourced from the Indian Ocean is transported to Butterworth before being exported to international markets, including Japan and Taiwan.

=== Mining ===
Penang's minuscule mining sector contributed a mere 0.1% of the state's GDP in 2022. The state mainly produces granite, sand and limestone. However, in 2023, it was reported that Penang holds an estimated RM100 billion worth of untapped rare-earth elements.

== External trade ==
Exports by major commodities
Commodities	2019 (%)	2020 (%)	2021 (%)	2022 (%)	2023 (%)	2024 (%)
Electronic integrated circuits	39.8	41.1	40.1	42.0	44.4	43.4
Other electrical and electronic products	14.1	13.2	11.5	10.7	9.6	10.8
Professional, scientific and controlling instruments and apparatus	8.0	8.1	8.4	7.7	7.8	8.1
Piezoelectric crystals	5.7	6.1	5.7	9.0	9.3	7.7
Telecommunications equipment, parts and accessories	N/A	6.2	6.9	6.5	6.4	5.1
Other valves and tubes, photocells, etc.	3.6	3.4	3.4	2.7	3.3	2.3
Electrical apparatus and parts	2.4	1.7	1.9	1.9	2.0	1.9
Parts and accessories for office machines and automatic data processing equipment	1.9	2.4	2.0	1.6	1.2	1.2
Jewellery of gold, silver and precious stones, including imitation	1.7	0.9	1.0	1.0	1.1	1.2
Palm-based oleochemical	0.9	0.8	1.0	0.9	0.6	0.7
Aircraft and associated equipment and parts	0.4	0.2	0.1	0.1	0.2	0.2
Tin, not alloyed	0.2	0.3	0.3	0	0.1	0.2
Wooden and rattan furniture	0.2	0.2	0.2	0.1	0.1	0.1
Palm oil	0.2	0.1	0.2	0.3	0.1	0.1
Heating and cooling equipment and parts	0.1	0.1	0.1	0	0.1	0.1
Other commodities	14.4	15.3	17.1	15.3	13.7	17.0
Total	100.0	100.0	100.0	100.0	100.0	100.0

Imports by major commodities
Commodities	2019 (%)	2020 (%)	2021 (%)	2022 (%)	2023 (%)	2024 (%)
Electronic integrated circuits	29.6	32.7	32.0	36.5	36.1	37.5
Piezoelectric crystals	15.4	14.2	12.9	11.9	11.2	10.3
Other electrical and electronic products	7.6	7.6	8.5	7.3	7.3	7.3
Parts and accessories for office machines and automatic data processing equipment	2.7	2.7	2.4	2.3	2.8	5.3
Electrical apparatus and parts	5.7	6.3	6.1	5.9	5.6	4.8
Machinery and equipment specialised for particular industries and parts	1.4	1.3	1.6	2.2	2.4	4.3
Measuring, checking, analysing and controlling instruments and apparatus	3.2	3.4	3.3	3.2	3.9	3.6
Gold, non-monetary	3.4	2.4	3.7	2.5	2.1	2.5
Telecommunications equipment, parts and accessories	2.9	2.9	N/A	2.4	2.3	1.9
Refined petroleum products	1.4	1.4	1.7	2.2	1.9	1.4
Other valves and tubes, photocells, etc.	1.4	1.5	1.7	1.5	1.4	1.2
Manufactures of base metal	1.1	1.1	1.1	1.0	0.9	0.9
Raw beet and cane sugar	N/A	0.6	N/A	0.6	1.0	0.8
Articles of plastics	0.5	0.6	0.6	0.6	0.7	0.7
Flat-rolled products of iron or steel	0.6	0.4	0.6	0.5	0.5	0.4
Other commodities	22.7	20.9	20.4	19.6	19.8	17.3
Total	100.0	100.0	100.0	100.0	100.0	100.0

Top trading partners of Penang
Country	2023						2024					
Country	Export		Import		Total		Export		Import		Total	
Country	RM million	%	RM million	%	RM million	%	RM million	%	RM million	%	RM million	%
China	79,748	17.8	58,240	23.3	137,988	19.8	76,964	15.6	68,356	23.3	145,320	18.4
United States	75,995	17.0	23,276	9.3	99,271	14.2	93,776	18.9	36,846	12.6	130,622	16.6
Singapore	66,667	14.9	29,172	11.7	95,839	13.7	73,212	14.8	34,942	11.9	108,154	13.7
Taiwan	26,071	5.8	51,441	20.6	77,512	11.1	47,023	9.5	57,678	19.7	104,701	13.3
Hong Kong	61,170	13.7	5,395	2.2	66,565	9.5	62,145	12.6	7,202	2.5	69,347	8.8
Japan	16,549	3.7	21,045	8.4	37,595	5.4	13,679	2.8	21,421	7.3	35,099	4.5
South Korea	16,619	3.7	10,838	4.3	27,457	3.9	19,145	3.9	14,474	4.9	33,618	4.3
Thailand	13,143	2.9	7,974	3.2	21,117	3.0	12,704	2.6	7,418	2.5	20,122	2.6
Vietnam	6,333	1.4	9,322	3.7	15,655	2.2	9,526	1.9	7,880	2.7	17,406	2.2
Germany	11,785	2.6	6,223	2.5	18,008	2.6	11,816	2.4	5,098	1.7	16,913	2.1
Netherlands	13,610	3.0	530	0.2	14,141	2.0	12,766	2.6	688	0.2	13,454	1.7
India	8,420	1.9	1,725	0.7	10,146	1.5	9,352	1.9	2,049	0.7	11,401	1.4
Mexico	8,326	1.9	1,429	0.6	9,755	1.4	6,663	1.3	2,554	0.9	9,217	1.2
Philippines	4,228	0.9	3,284	1.3	7,513	1.1	3,667	0.7	3,413	1.2	7,080	0.9
United Arab Emirates	3,055	0.7	2,221	0.9	5,276	0.8	3,104	0.6	3,541	1.2	6,645	0.8
Australia	4,667	1.0	2,252	0.9	6,919	1.0	4,655	0.9	1,821	0.6	6,476	0.8
Indonesia	4,708	1.1	2,408	1.0	7,116	1.0	3,320	0.7	2,320	0.8	5,640	0.7
Costa Rica	1,410	0.3	1,170	0.5	2,580	0.4	1,634	0.3	2,147	0.7	3,781	0.5
Belgium	2,849	0.6	110	0	2,959	0.4	3,226	0.7	162	0.1	3,389	0.4
Switzerland	1,651	0.4	1,043	0.4	2,693	0.4	1,429	0.3	1,444	0.5	2,873	0.4

Exports by cities in Penang
City	Port of entry	2023 (RM million)	2022 (RM million)	2021 (RM million)	2020 (RM million)	2019 (RM million)	2018 (RM million)
George Town	Penang International Airport	365,245	385,034	295,173	254,144	230,724	232,576
Seberang Perai	Port of Penang	69,490	65,715	59,326	56,766	60,537	56,261

== Inbound investments ==
Manufacturing investments in Penang by countries of origin, 2019 to 2023
Country	2019 (RM million)	2020 (RM million)	2021 (RM million)	2022 (RM million)	2023 (RM million)
Australia	0	313	0	0	25,506
Austria	0	0	0	3,720	0
Belize	0	14,135	0	0	0
Bermuda	895	881	4,856	0	0
British Indian Ocean Territory	0	47,300	0	0	0
British Virgin Islands	547,730	0	11,000	0	3,901
Canada	0	0	43,079	0	0
Cayman Islands	108,289	76,421	0	0	15,953,361
China	710,036	148,134	1,279,532	284,042	1,695,815
Denmark	0	0	0	90,446	0
Germany	55,476	1,360	56,000	210,607	0
France	0	0	0	34,811	19,365
Hong Kong	224,008	1,909,234	149,189	2,920,868	103,742
India	0	55	0	0	0
Indonesia	7,305	0	0	0	0
Ireland	0	0	0	650,000	0
Italy	262,708	0	0	0	0
Japan	51,225	164,110	21,350	44,178	1,078,163
Jordan	0	0	0	0	23,521
Liechtenstein	0	0	0	700	0
Luxembourg	0	0	0	0	47,448
Malaysia	1,854,918	3,562,795	1,784,567	3,951,886	3,285,735
Myanmar	280	0	0	0	0
Netherlands	58,020	248,233	71,197,470	58,336	26,595,788
Norway	280	0	0	0	7,327
Russia	0	0	0	0	66,606
Seychelles	0	0	0	0	8
Singapore	1,840,044	3,247,479	1,038,015	3,333,234	7,050,659
South Korea	23,632	0	0	0	0
Sweden	0	0	0	163,005	7,800
Switzerland	0	2,590,814	145,617	384,624	0
Taiwan	890,114	3,648	42,242	12,360	782,719
Thailand	0	0	0	3,681	7,910
United Kingdom	1,513,000	0	0	2,775	0
United States	8,652,483	2,057,742	450,767	1,561,668	6,663,378
Others	54,916	40,310	0	5	1,883
Total	16,855,360	14,112,963	76,223,684	13,710,945	63,420,634

Manufacturing investments in Penang by cities and districts, 2019 to 2023
City	District	2019 (RM million)	2020 (RM million)	2021 (RM million)	2022 (RM million)	2023 (RM million)
George Town	Northeast	3,300,600	57,834	0	20,650	56,641
George Town	Southwest	7,015,743	4,378,614	70,800,792	2,823,129	43,876,591
Seberang Perai	North	123,249	123,326	30,452	135,798	3,456,963
Seberang Perai	Central	1,871,606	2,534,112	1,639,353	1,728,029	11,152,220
Seberang Perai	South	4,544,163	7,019,076	3,753,086	9,003,339	4,878,220

== Special economic zones ==
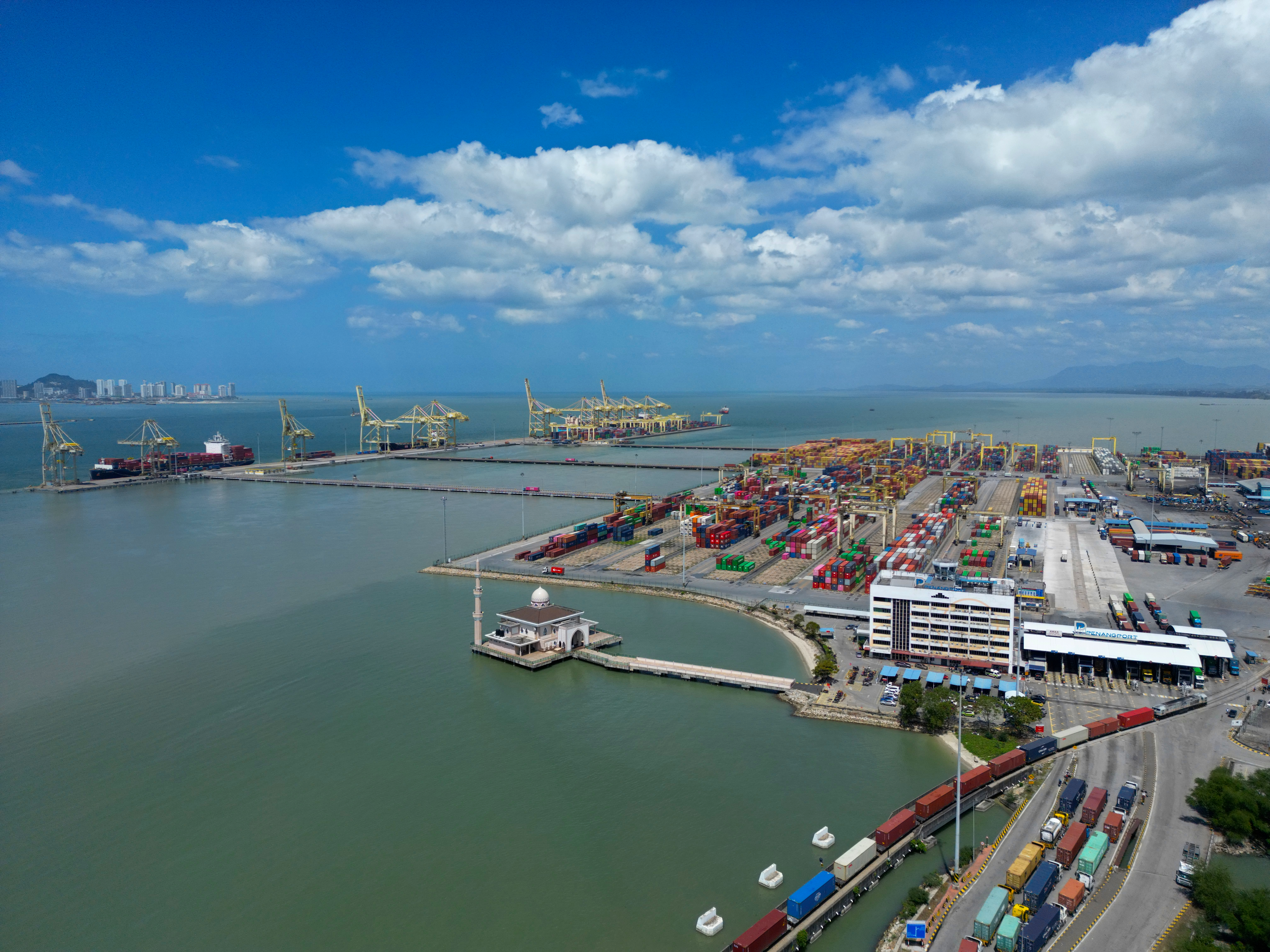
The Port of Penang in Seberang Perai was declared a Free Commercial Zone (FCZ) in 2021.

As of 2023, Penang is home to six free-trade zones. Free industrial zones were first introduced by the Malaysian federal government through the Free Trade Zone Act 1971, designating secure areas where manufactured goods are exempt from taxes and businesses operate with minimal customs inspections. Building upon this concept, free commercial zones were introduced as a variant under the Free Zones Act of 1990.

=== Free industrial zones ===
- Bayan Lepas Free Industrial Zone
- Perai Free Industrial Zone

=== Free commercial zones ===
- Malaysia Airlines Penang Cargo Centre, Penang International Airport
- Second Air Cargo Complex, Penang International Airport
- North Butterworth Container Terminal, Port of Penang
- Butterworth Deep Water Wharves, Port of Penang

== Public finance ==
The Penang state government, like other Malaysian states, has limited ability to generate revenue due to constraints imposed by the federal constitution. Each state is constitutionally only authorised to generate revenue from land, natural resources and forests within its jurisdiction, as well as from receipts related to applications and development plans. The centralised power structure in Malaysia restricts states from borrowing and necessitates their reliance on the federal government for infrastructure funds. In comparison to larger and more resource-rich states, Penang faces challenges in generating revenue due to its small land area and lack of natural resources.

Prior to a change in federal government in 2018, Penang's financial position was further complicated by strained relations between the Barisan Nasional-controlled federal government and the Pakatan Rakyat-led state government. Partisanship during Najib Razak's administration exacerbated fiscal imbalances, with Penang receiving only RM162.7 million in federal grants in 2013, which accounted for a mere 2.85% of the state's tax revenues to the federal government. These have prompted calls for decentralisation. In 2024, Chief Minister Chow Kon Yeow stated that he intended to pursue higher federal tax allocations for Penang.

Financial position of the Penang state government, 2020 to 2022
	2020 (RM million)	2021 (RM million)	2022 (RM million)
Revenue	467.3	692.2	595.1
Tax revenue	130.1	133.3	148.3
Non-tax revenue	254.2	474.2	336.3
Non-tax receipts	83.0	84.7	110.4
Expenditure	734.1	730.9	755.0
Emoluments	175.7	175.1	180.3
Supplies and services	142.9	150.1	179.9
Assets	3.5	4.5	6.4
Grants and fixed charges	407.0	397.5	386.9
Other expenditures	5.0	3.7	1.5
Surplus/deficit	-267.1	-38.7	-160.0

== See also ==
- Economy of Malaysia
