= Bayan Lepas Free Industrial Zone =

Industrial zone in George Town, Penang, Malaysia

Bayan Lepas Free Industrial Zone Zon Perindustrian Bebas Bayan Lepas
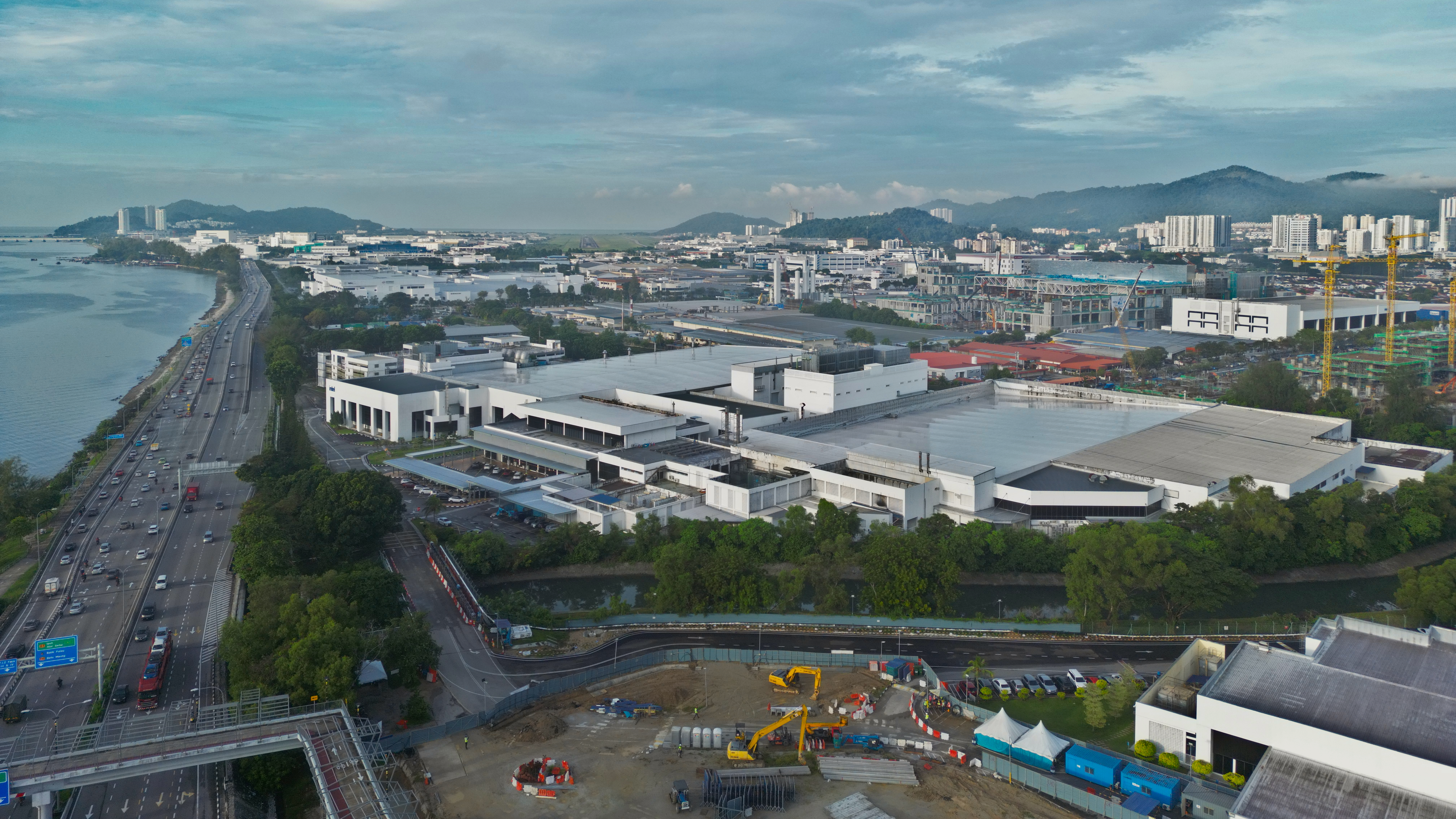
- Interactive map of Bayan Lepas Free Industrial Zone
- Location within George Town in Penang
- Coordinates: 5°18′2.16″N 100°17′24″E
- Country: Malaysia
- State: Penang
- City: George Town
- Establishment: 1972

Government
  - Local government: Penang Island City Council

Area
  - Total: 570 ha (1,400 acres)
- Time zone: UTC+8 (MST)
  - Summer (DST): Not observed
- Postal code: 11900
- Area code(s): +6046

The Bayan Lepas Free Industrial Zone (Bayan Lepas FIZ) is a free trade zone within George Town in the Malaysian state of Penang. Located adjacent to the Penang International Airport and 12 km (7.5 mi) south of the city centre, it is a high-tech industrial park widely regarded as the Silicon Valley of the East.

Created in 1972 as Malaysia's first free trade zone, the Bayan Lepas FIZ played a critical role in Penang's economic diversification and is now home to various multinational corporations, including Bosch, Motorola, Dell, Intel and Hewlett-Packard.

== History ==
The 1,400-acre (5.7 km^{2}) Bayan Lepas FIZ was the brainchild of Lim Chong Eu, who served as the Chief Minister of Penang between 1969 and 1990, in response to Penang's economic downturn at the time. George Town, Penang's capital city, had its free port status revoked by the Malaysian federal government in 1969, leading to massive unemployment which peaked at 16.4%. Lim identified the electronics sector as having the best potential to absorb the state's excess semi-skilled workforce.

Nearly 1,000 acres (4.0 km^{2}) of land adjacent to the Penang International Airport were acquired for the construction of Malaysia's first free trade zone, as well as the adjacent township of Bayan Baru. The Penang Development Corporation (PDC) was tasked with the construction of both the zone and the township. To attract multinational corporations to the zone, the Free Trade Zones Act was enacted by the Malaysian federal government in 1971 and pioneer tax incentives were offered.

The first phase of the FIZ, covering an area between the airport, Jalan Sultan Azlan Shah and the Keluang River, was opened in 1972. The zone has since been expanded and developed in phases. Phase 2 encompasses an area between Jalan Sultan Azlan Shah, Bukit Gedung and the Snake Temple. Phase 3 was partially built on reclaimed land, while Phase 4, the largest and final phase, was completed by the 1990s.

The FIZ proved successful in attracting multinational firms and its creation played a vital role in reversing Penang's economic crisis. Intel, AMD, Hewlett-Packard, Clarion, National Semiconductor, Hitachi, Osram, and Bosch—collectively known as the Samurai Eight—were the first multinational companies to set up factories within the zone, followed by several other firms including Motorola and Dell. These firms are also supported by smaller, local-owned enterprises and startups, such as Piktochart. Consequently, the manufacturing sector became one of Penang's largest economic sectors, while the zone itself has been described by the international press as the Silicon Valley of the East.

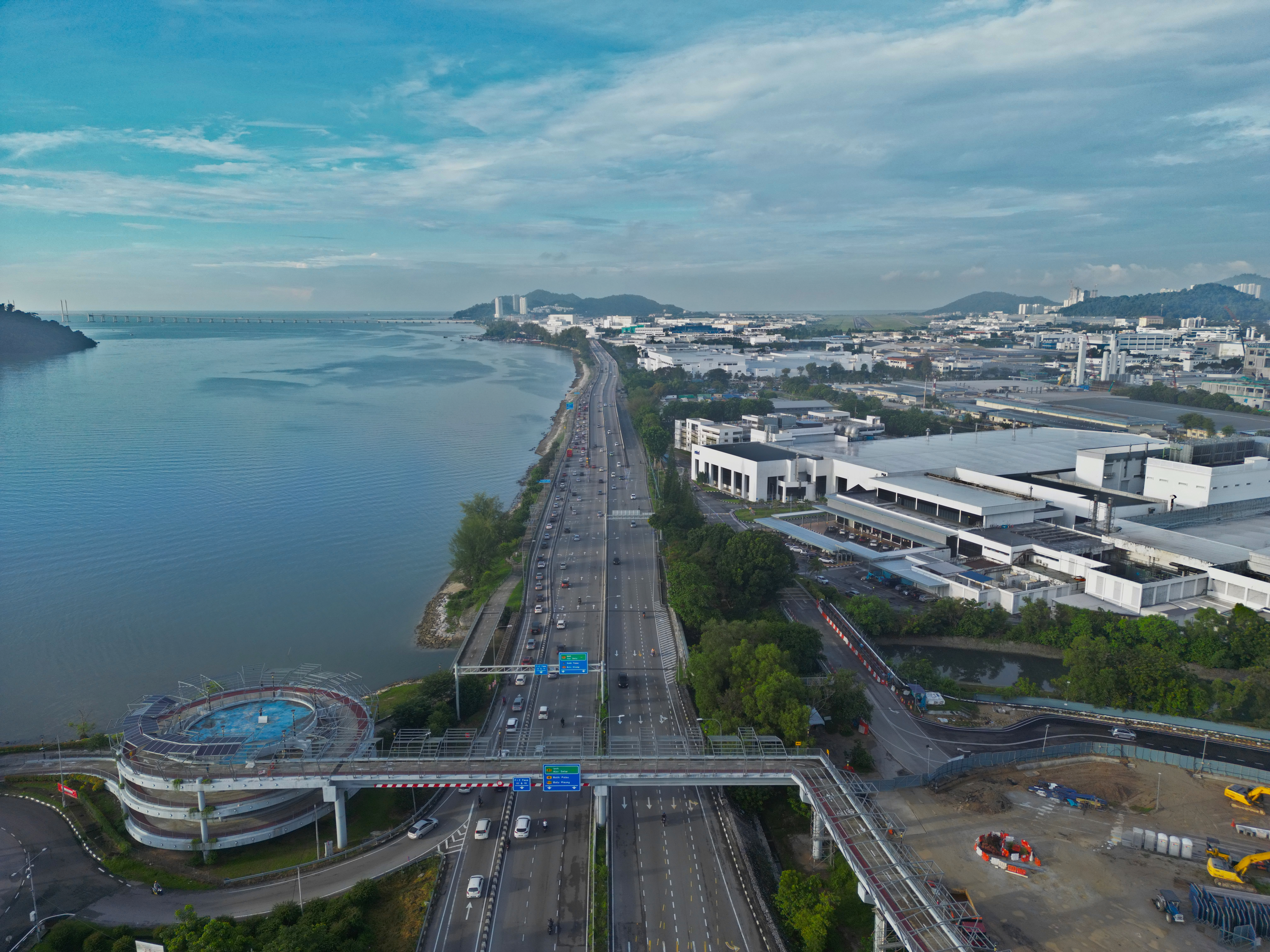
The Tun Dr Lim Chong Eu Expressway, pictured here, links the Bayan Lepas FIZ with downtown George Town, the Penang Bridge and the Second Penang Bridge.

== Infrastructure ==
The Bayan Lepas FIZ lies next to the Penang International Airport, allowing for ease of exports. This elevated George Town as the top exporter among Malaysian cities. In addition, the FIZ is also connected to the city centre, the Penang Bridge and the Second Penang Bridge via the Tun Dr Lim Chong Eu Expressway and the pan-island Malaysia Federal Route 6.

== Tenants ==
The following is an incomplete list of multinational firms within the Bayan Lepas FIZ.

=== Phase 1 ===
- Osram Opto Semiconductors GmbH
- Bosch
- Clarion
- Amphenol

=== Phase 2 ===
- Dynacraft BSC
- Renesas Electronics
- B. Braun
- Infineon Technologies

=== Phase 3 ===
- Intel
- Clarion
- Western Digital
- AMD
- Agilent Technologies
- Keysight
- Broadcom
- Jabil
- Flex
- Renesas Electronics
- Lumileds

=== Phase 4 ===
- Dell
- Schenker AG
- Motorola
- ASE Group
- Jabil
- Lam Research
- Nippon Express
- DHL
- Analog Devices
- Bosch
- Intel
- Sanmina Corporation
- Lumileds
- Western Digital
- Bruker
- Benchmark Electronics
- Linde
- Expeditors International
- Zebra Technologies
- UST
- CEVA Logistics
- Microchip Technology
Locations of major companies within the Bayan Lepas Free Industrial Zone.
Click link at the top right corner to zoom in.
1 Intel
2 Dell
3 AMD
4 Osram
5 Bosch
6 Clarion
7 Amphenol
8 Dynacraft
9 Renesas
10 B. Braun
11 Infineon
12 Broadcom
13 Western Digital
14 Agilent
15 Keysight
16 Jabil
17 Flex
18 Lumileds
19 Schenker
20 Motorola
21 Lam Research
22 ASE
23 Analog
24 Lumileds
25 Sanmina
26 Bruker
27 Benchmark
28 Microchip
29 Nippon Express
30 DHL
31 Linde
32 Zebra
33 UST
34 CEVA
35 Expeditors
36 Ambu

== Economy ==
In 2021 alone, the Bayan Lepas FIZ received almost RM71 billion of investments, about 93% of Penang's total investments that year. An estimated RM295,173 million worth of exports also passed through the Penang International Airport throughout 2021, the largest among all entry and exit points in Malaysia.

== See also ==
- Perai Free Industrial Zone
