= Bayan Lepas (disambiguation) =

Bayan Lepas is a suburb of George Town in the Malaysian state of Penang.

Bayan Lepas may also refer to:

- Bayan Lepas (state constituency), state constituency in Penang, Malaysia
- Bayan Lepas Free Industrial Zone, free trade zone within George Town in the Malaysian state of Penang
- Mutiara Line, formerly known as the Bayan Lepas line, light rail transit system in Penang
- Penang International Airport, formerly known as the Bayan Lepas International Airport, international airport in George Town, Penang
