= Franky So =

Franky So received his Ph.D. from the University of Southern California. He worked for Motorola and OSRAM Opto-Semiconductors for 14 years before he became a professor at the University of Florida. He was a Rolf E Hummel Professor of Electronic Materials in the Department of Materials Science and Engineering at the University of Florida. Since 2015, he joined the North Carolina State University and became the Walter and Ida Freeman Distinguished Professor of Materials Science and Engineering.

So was named Fellow of the Institute of Electrical and Electronics Engineers (IEEE) in 2012, "for contributions to organic light emitting diodes". So is also a Fellow of the National Academy of Inventors, Materials Research Society, Optica, Society for Information Display, and SPIE. He is the editor-in-chief of Materials Science and Engineering Reports and chairs the OLED Symposium of the SPIE Optics and Photonics conference.
