= Indian Institute of Management Shillong =

Management institute in Shillong, India

- Former name: Rajiv Gandhi Indian Institute of Management Shillong
- Type: Public business school
- Established: 2007; 19 years ago
- Accreditation: AACSB; EQUIS
- Chairperson: Shishir Bajoria
- Director: Dr. Arun Mohan Sherry
- Academic staff: 35
- Administrative staff: 59
- Location: Shillong, Meghalaya, India; 25°33′30.27″N 91°54′18.09″E
- Campus: Urban
- Website: www.iimshillong.ac.in

Indian Institute of Management Shillong (IIM Shillong or IIM-S) is a public, fully autonomous management institute in the city of Shillong, Meghalaya. It was the seventh Indian Institute of Management to be established in India.

Founded in 2007, IIM Shillong offers postgraduate, doctoral, and executive programmes in management education, and Management Development Programmes (MDPs) spanning different streams of management. Admissions to the institute are based on scores obtained in the Common Admission Test (CAT) and further an extempore and personal interview rounds. In addition, from 2025, the institute also admits students to the Integrated Programme in Management (IPM), a five-year course, through the IPMAT (IIM Indore) entrance examination.The institute also has a Centre for Development of North Eastern Region (CEDNER), constituted to offer programmes relevant to the local community and society of the state and the region.

== History ==
The proposal to start an Indian Institute of Management in the Northeast was unanimously taken in June 2004 by the Union Minister of Human Resource Development along with the Chief Ministers of the North Eastern states in the review meeting held at Shillong. Shillong was drafted as the permanent location for the institute after consultation between the Ministry of Development of North Eastern Region (MDONER) and the Chief Ministers of the states.

The foundation stone for the institute was laid by Shri. Arjun Singh, Union Minister of Human Resource Development, on 1 December 2007. The admittance of the first batch of students for the Post-Graduate Programme was formally inaugurated by Dr Donkupar Roy, Chief Minister of Meghalaya, on 4 July 2008.

The institute was set up at the Mayurbhanj Palace, the summer retreat of the Mayurbhanj Kings of Odisha. The Palace was renovated by the Meghalaya government with the construction of a permanent campus in development at Umsawli.

The first chairman of the Board of Governors was Shri. Rathindra Nath Dutta, and the first director, Prof Ashoke K. Dutta.

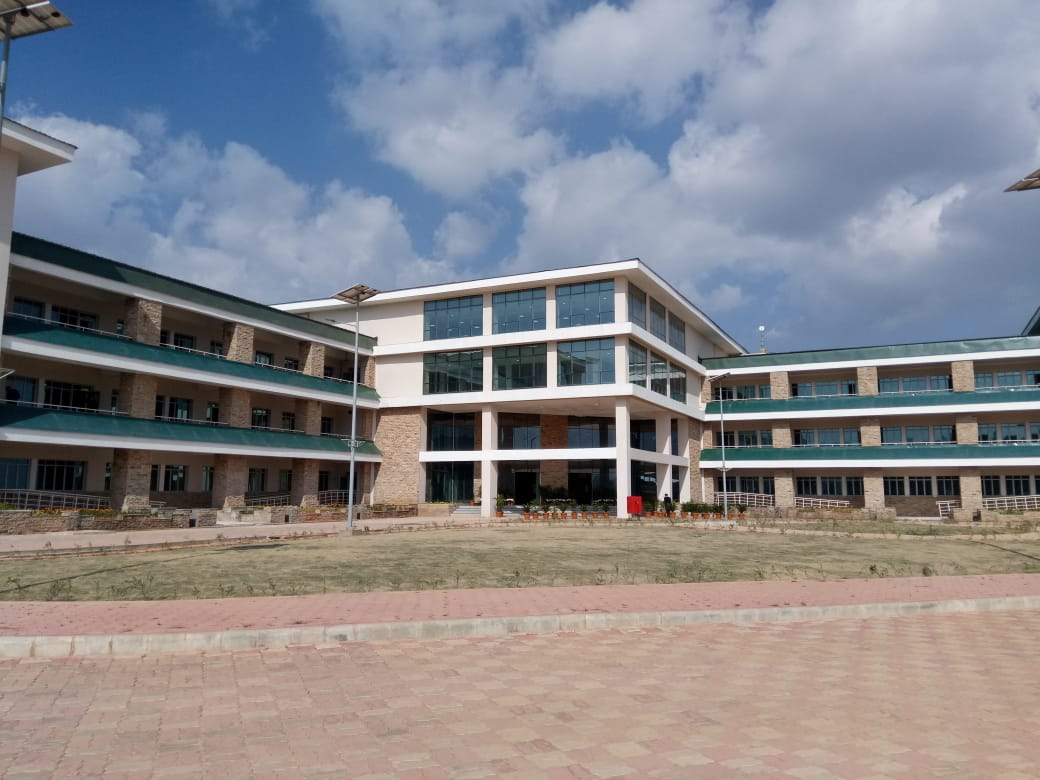
IIM Shillong New Campus

== Institute Logo ==
IIM Shillong's logo was designed by Anil Sinha and Ankita Gajjar from the National Institute of Design, Ahmedabad.

== Campus ==
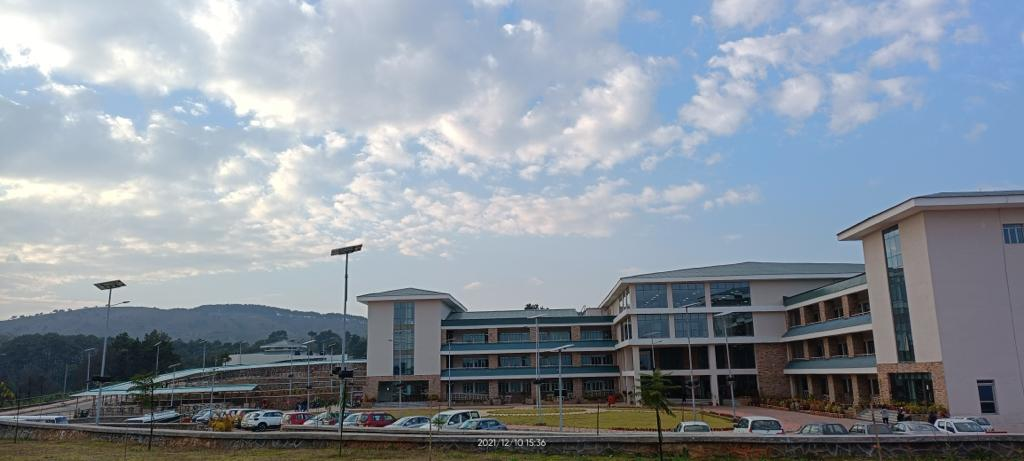
Front Lawns

The campus has an auditorium for conducting seminars, conferences, culture programmes, students' events and other significant events of the institute.

== Academics ==
=== Post-Graduate Programme in Management (PGPM) ===
This is a two-year, fully residential Master of Business Administration program with a curriculum comprising a mix of compulsory courses and electives, supplemented by specialized courses on industry sectors. Participants are offered subjects from the areas of economics, finance, human resources, information technology, marketing, operations, and general management. The programme begins with a two-week foundation course on sustainability which focuses on developing sustainable practices in business management. Sustainability modules are also incorporated into every subject offered.

Some of the unique courses offered at IIM Shillong include Northeast Studies, Doing Business in the Northeast, Decoding Organizational Pathologies, and Sports Management, to name a few. Participants in the second year are also encouraged to undertake courses of independent study (CIS). Participants of the programme also undergo a summer internship between April and June, as part of the course.

=== Post Graduate Program for Executives – (PGPEx) ===
This is a twelve-month fully residential Executive Master of Business Administration (Executive MBA) program for executives that aims to provide the opportunity to learn and conduct trans-national business. This course is spread across two campuses – IIM Shillong and [IÉSEG School of Management], Paris, France. In addition to classroom facilitation, the course structure also includes practical learning through internships and industry visits in both countries.

=== Integrated Programme in Management (IPM) ===
The Integrated Programme in Management (IPM) at IIM Shillong is a five-year, fully residential course combining undergraduate and postgraduate management education, with admissions through the IPMAT (IIM Indore) entrance examination. The program integrates Indian philosophical traditions with contemporary management practices and learner-centered pedagogies aligned with the National Education Policy (NEP) 2020. It emphasizes holistic, ethical, and socially responsible leadership, blending core management subjects with interdisciplinary modules on Indigenous Knowledge Systems, social sciences, and sustainability. The curriculum combines theoretical instruction with practicums and experiential learning, aiming to develop reflective, responsible, and culturally grounded leaders.

End of First Year	Certificate in Management
End of Second Year	Diploma in Management
End of Third Year	UG Degree – Bachelor in Business Administration – BBA
End of Fourth Year	UG Degree – Bachelor in Business Administration – BBA (Honors)
End of Fifth Year	PG Degree – Masters in Business Administration MBA

=== Doctoral Programme (PhD) ===
This is the doctoral level programme offered by IIM Shillong. The PhD is a four-year fully residential Doctor of Management programme fellowships awarded in the following areas: economics, finance, HR, information systems, marketing, and operations management. Admissions for this programme are based on scores obtained through CAT, GMAT, GATE, GRE, or the Junior Research Fellowship (JRF) examination.

=== Management Development Programme (MDP) ===
These are short duration programmes varying from two days to six months, for working executives from the industry, education, and government sectors, held both on- and off-campus. The MDPs furnish executives a chance to familiarize themselves with the latest techniques, tools, and skills spanning different streams of management from Education Management to Sustainable Development.

=== Centre for Development of North Eastern Region (CEDNER) ===
Formerly known as the Accelerated Learning Centre (ALC), the CEDNER has been constituted to organize both short-term and long-term programmes relevant to the local community and society of the state and the region. Courses offered at the CEDNER respond to local needs, and make institute facilities available for training people from the region during various phases of their business and entrepreneurial activity.

=== Faculty Development Programme (FDP) ===
The institute also offers programmes for faculty development at regular intervals to help familiarize with current and relevant industry trends and practices.

=== Course Pedagogy ===
The pedagogy at IIM Shillong follows a case-based system. Participants are provided cases and supplement readings. Analysis and solutions are then discussed in groups with faculty facilitating and grading the dialogue. Participants are also encouraged to undertake projects falling under the purview of the subject and share their learnings with others.

=== Faculty ===
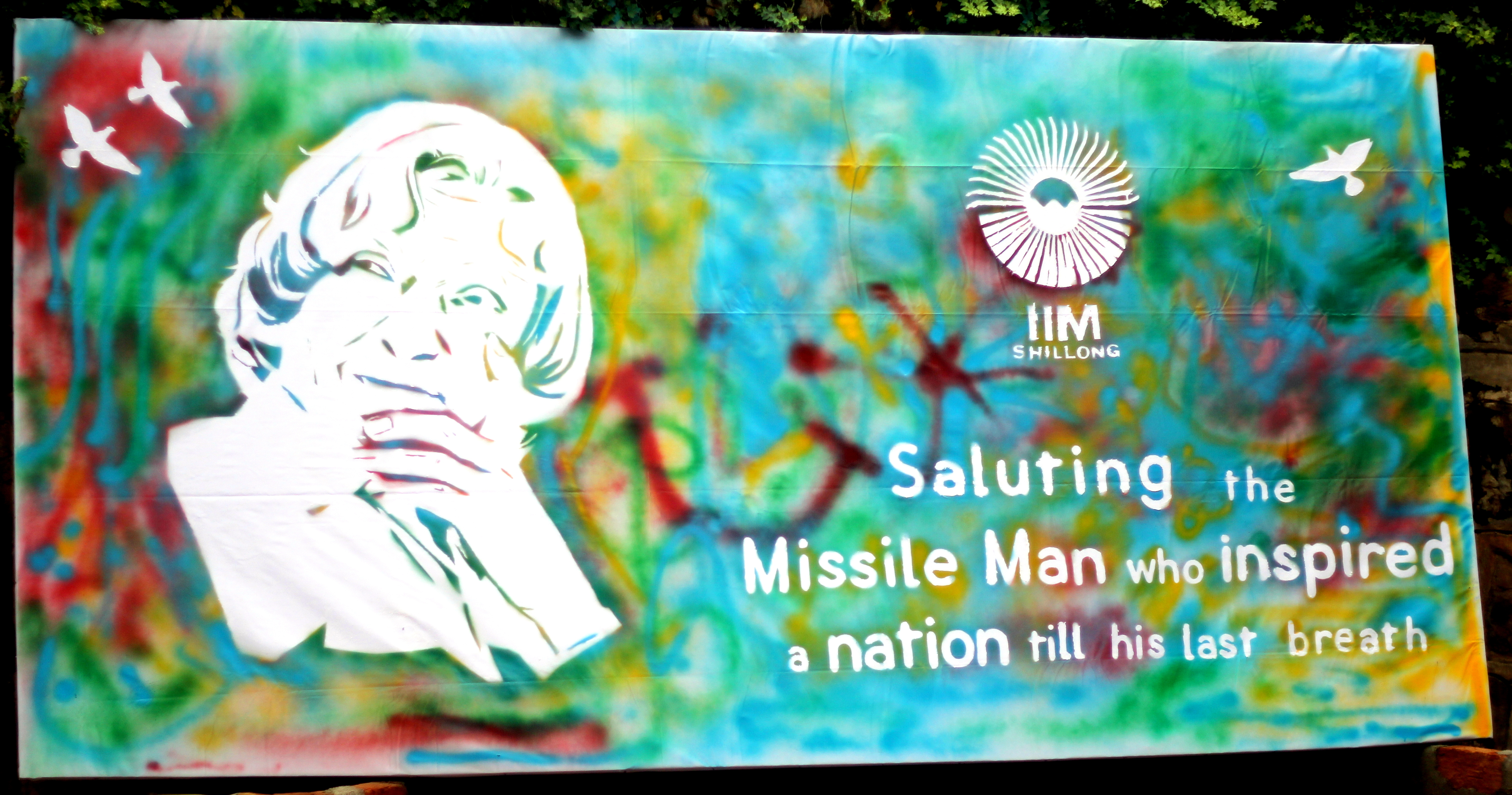
Canvas graffiti of Dr A. P. J. Abdul Kalam as an IIM Shillong student tribute

The institute has a current faculty strength of 28 permanent faculty and close to 40 visiting faculty. Faculty visiting IIM Shillong are usually renowned professors from institutes across the world.

The former President of India, Dr A. P. J. Abdul Kalam, was a regular visiting faculty at the institute, offering courses for the second year students on a variety of subjects. Dr Kalam, on 27 July 2015, collapsed while delivering a lecture on 'Creating a Liveable Planet' at the institute. After being placed in an intensive care unit, Dr Kalam was confirmed dead owing to a sudden cardiac arrest.

=== International Collaborations ===
IIM Shillong currently has a memorandum of understanding (MoU) with Nanyang Technological University for the PGPM. MoUs signed previously include those with Drexel University, Virginia Commonwealth University, and Hamburg Media School, among others. The PGPEx has a MoU with Ocean University of China, Qingdao, P.R.C and (School of Management) Fudan University, Shanghai P.R.C

=== Admissions ===
Admission to IIM Shillong is governed by the Common Admission Test (CAT), an annual exam administered by the IIMs for selection into various business schools across India. The selection to IIM Shillong is a multi-stage process that is defined by the admission policy. There are slight variations in the criteria depending on the course applied for.

In 2025, IIM Shillong admitted its first batch of students to the Integrated Programme in Management (IPM), a five-year course that combines undergraduate and postgraduate management education. Admissions to the programme are based on the IPMAT (IIM Indore) entrance examination.

=== Library ===
The library, named the Knowledge Centre, has books, journals, magazines, and other information resources. The Knowledge Centre is also fully automated with the help of VTLS, maintaining different databases for books, reports, audio cassettes, video cassettes, CDs and journal articles.

=== Rankings ===
Institute rankings

Business/Management – India
- NIRF (2022): 26

Outlook I Care has revealed the IIM Shillong Ranking 2021 and the institute is placed 11th among the country's top 50 management schools. According to the NIRF Management Ranking 2022, IIM Shillong is ranked 26th. IIM Shillong is ranked 16th among India's top 100 business schools in the India Today MDRA ranking 2020.

== Student life ==
=== Student Activities ===
IIM Shillong is a student-run institute with participants taking care of daily functioning of the institute outside academics and administration. This is with a view to provide the participants hands-on experience in everyday management, problem-solving, and event management.

Student committees handle everyday processes such as placements, hostel and IT requirements, student affairs, etc. Clubs are societies that are dedicated to interest in different domains of management and otherwise. They also play pivotal roles in determining electives offered under different domains.

=== Committees ===
- Alumni Committee – provide year-round interfacing between the alumni and institute, primarily over videoconferencing and the alumni portal. Also organize Melange, the annual alumni meet.
- Cultural Committee – all festive celebrations within the institute and the local community are organized by the Cultural Committee. Other events organized include SPICMACAY concerts and Waltzzz, the annual dance workshop.
- Hostel Committee – take care of hostel amenities pertaining to stay and food. The committee also organizes the intra-college sports fest, Rannbhoomi.
- IT Committee – provide IT related solutions to the participants, faculty, and staff.
- Placement Committee – coordinate Summer Internship and Final Placements for the participants.
- Public Relations Cell – handle all external communication with the media, corporate, and other institutes. The committee hosts multiple events throughout the year – The Podium, the corporate interaction series; Synergy, the corporate videoconferencing series; and TEDxIIMShillong, an independently organized TED event at IIM Shillong. The PR Cell is also responsible for online presence, institute information, admission mentoring, subscriptions, and merchandising.
- Sports Committee – responsible for the selection and management of sporting teams representing IIM Shillong. They also organize the Bamboo Premier League and Kopda Cup, auction-based intra-college football and cricket tournaments.
- Student Council – the apex student body. The Council handles all student affairs and interfaces between students and the administration. They also organize the annual Golf Cup; KhlurThma, the annual management fest; and Udaan, the annual business conclave.
- Symphony, the Literary Committee – publish the annual institute magazine, Symphony. Also arrange weekly movie screenings and group discussions.

=== Special Interest Groups (SIGs) ===
Special Interest Groups are student groups that pursue allied interests. There are a number of SIGs, for various pursuits such as photography, trekking, cinema, gaming, etc.

=== Internships & Placements ===
Summer Internships are mandated as part of the course curricula. The Placement Committee of IIM Shillong is responsible for overseeing the Summer Internship and Final Placements. Prominent recruiters over the past few years for both the Summer Internships and Final Placements include Amazon, American Express, Boston Consulting Group, Beiersdorf, Bosch, D. E. Shaw & Co., Dabur, Deloitte, Egon Zehnder, Flipkart, Google, GSK, Hero MotoCorp, HSBC, Hyundai, IBM, ITC, J. P. Morgan Chase, KPMG, L’Oréal, Mahindra, MetLife, Nestlé, Nomura, Ola, Perfetti van Melle, PricewaterhouseCoopers, Procter & Gamble, Renault–Nissan, Reserve Bank of India, Siemens, Snapdeal, State Bank of India, Tata Administration Services, Volvo, and Yes Bank to name a few. Students have also opted outed of placements to start their own ventures across the world.

=== Live Projects & Competitions ===
A number of live projects are undertaken by the students of IIM Shillong. These range from government initiatives to projects from entrepreneurial ventures. These projects serve to enhance the participants’ competence across different domains while also providing additional exposure to the industry.

Students also partake in a number of competitions hosted by various companies and other business schools. IIM Shillong has developed proficient niche for competitions, having won various prestigious competitions such as the American Express Centurion Challenge, the HSBC IB League, L’Oréal Brandstorm, Nomura Case Study Competition, Tata Steel-a-thon, and Wipro Earthian, to name a few.

=== Events ===
==== The Podium ====
The Podium is the annual corporate interaction series of IIM Shillong. Organized jointly by the Public Relations Cell and the Placement Committee, the event sees corporate leaders from top companies address the participants on the industry and provide inputs on structuring their careers. The series is set over 20 sessions between the months of July and September.

==== EmergE ====
Emerge is the flagship entrepreneurship summit at IIM Shillong held mid-September. The event hosts various conclaves where industry doyens have a dialogue on their areas of expertise. EmergE also has two competitions for students from business schools - R€vo£u$n, the business plan competition and Reveal, the football case study sponsored by Royal Wahingdoh.

==== KhlurThma ====
KhlurThma is the annual management fest of IIM Shillong. The event is held during the second week of October in tandem with the Golf Cup. The event sees participation from over 5000 teams across the top business schools in India.

==== Golf Cup ====
The IIM Shillong Golf Cup is the flagship event of the institute. Held in October or November every year, the Golf Cup is the first such tournament to be held by any business school in India. The event emphasizes on taking corporate interaction out of the classroom onto the greens. Every year, the event sees a massive participation of reputed golfers, corporates, and top bureaucrats who compete at the Shillong Golf Course in various categories.

==== Udaan ====
Udaan is the annual business conclave that is hosted at IIM Shillong with the objective of connecting businesses from the Northeast with resources from across the world. Udaan serves as a platform where Northeast businesses can get access to advanced industry practices and technical know-how from industry pioneers, to utilize them in enhancing productivity.

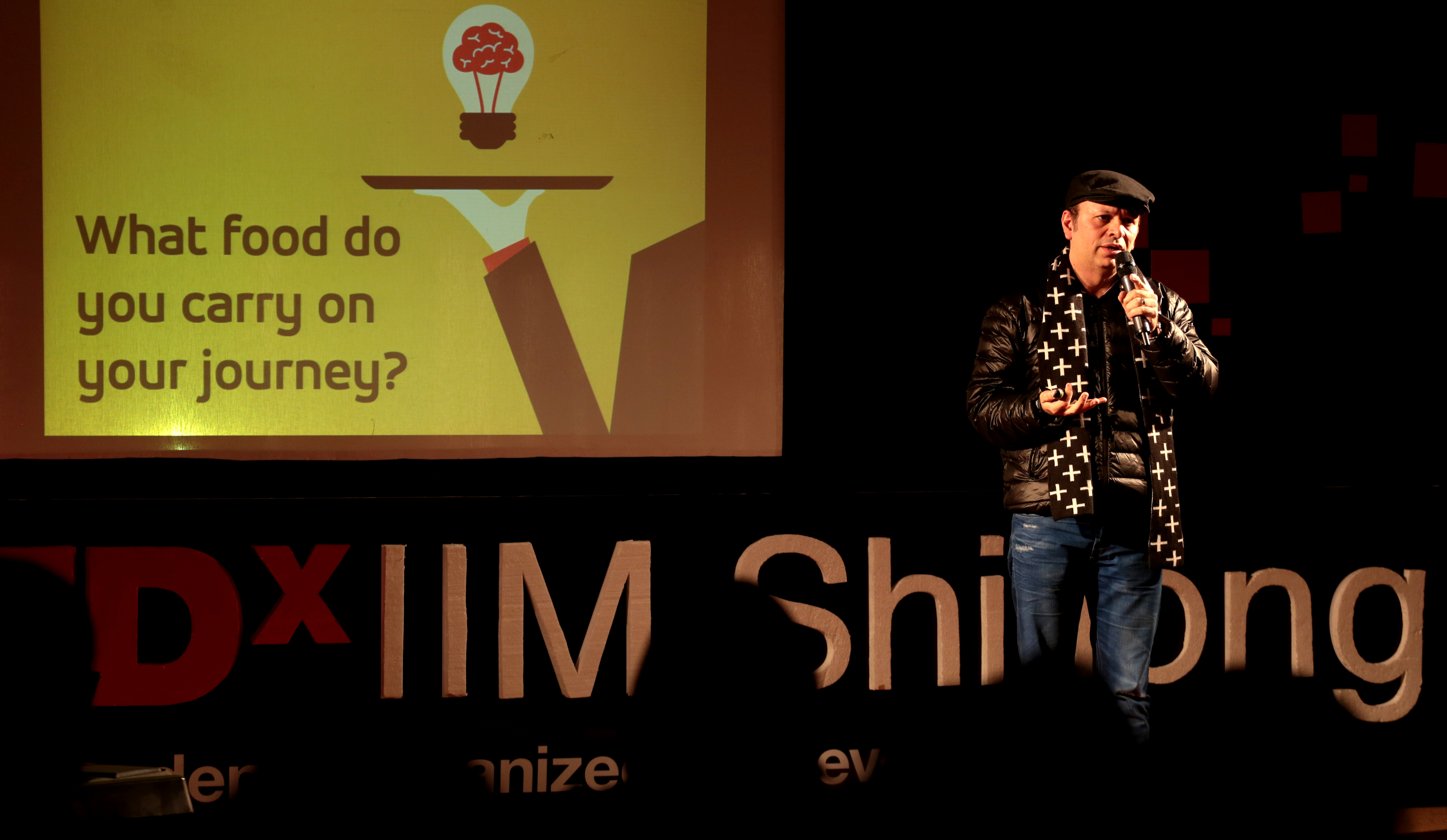
Roshan Abbas at TEDxIIMShillong

==== TEDxIIMShillong ====
An independently organized TED event, under the banner of TED, TEDxIIMShillong, held in February every year, provides the platform to initiate ideas on fields outside business studies particularly, technology, entertainment, and design. The 2014 event organizer from the institute also received a TEDxChange Scholarship and represented India at TEDGlobal 2014 in Rio de Janeiro.

==== Melange ====
Melange is the annual alumni meet held towards the end of January. Organized by the Alumni Committee, the event serves as a congregation of IIM Shillong's alumni while also keeping the alumni abreast about the institute's progress.

==== SusCon ====
The Sustainability Conference is the annual international conference on sustainability held in March every year. The conferences sees papers on sustainability across different domains, submitted from all over the world. Scholars and corporate from over 20 countries have participated over multiple editions of the conference.

==== Nexus ====
Nexus is the annual senior-junior meet held in the month of May. Held across six cities, Nexus provides incoming participants with a better idea on the two years at IIM Shillong as they get to interact with both the second year students and alumni.

==== Other Events and Initiatives ====
IIM Shillong has also initiated a number of events that are still in their nascent stages such as, the Shillong chapter of the Mensa IQ Test; PiktoTourShillong a global infographics workshop held across five destinations worldwide by Piktochart; a 5k run that flags off the Golf Cup, and Nurturing Minds, a teaching initiative by the students for the local community. The institute also observes various days of national importance, marked by deliverances.

IIM Shillong had also been instrumental in drafting Meghalaya's sports policy ahead of the 2016 South Asian Games in Shillong and Guwahati.
