= Shishir Bajoria =

Indian politician and businessman

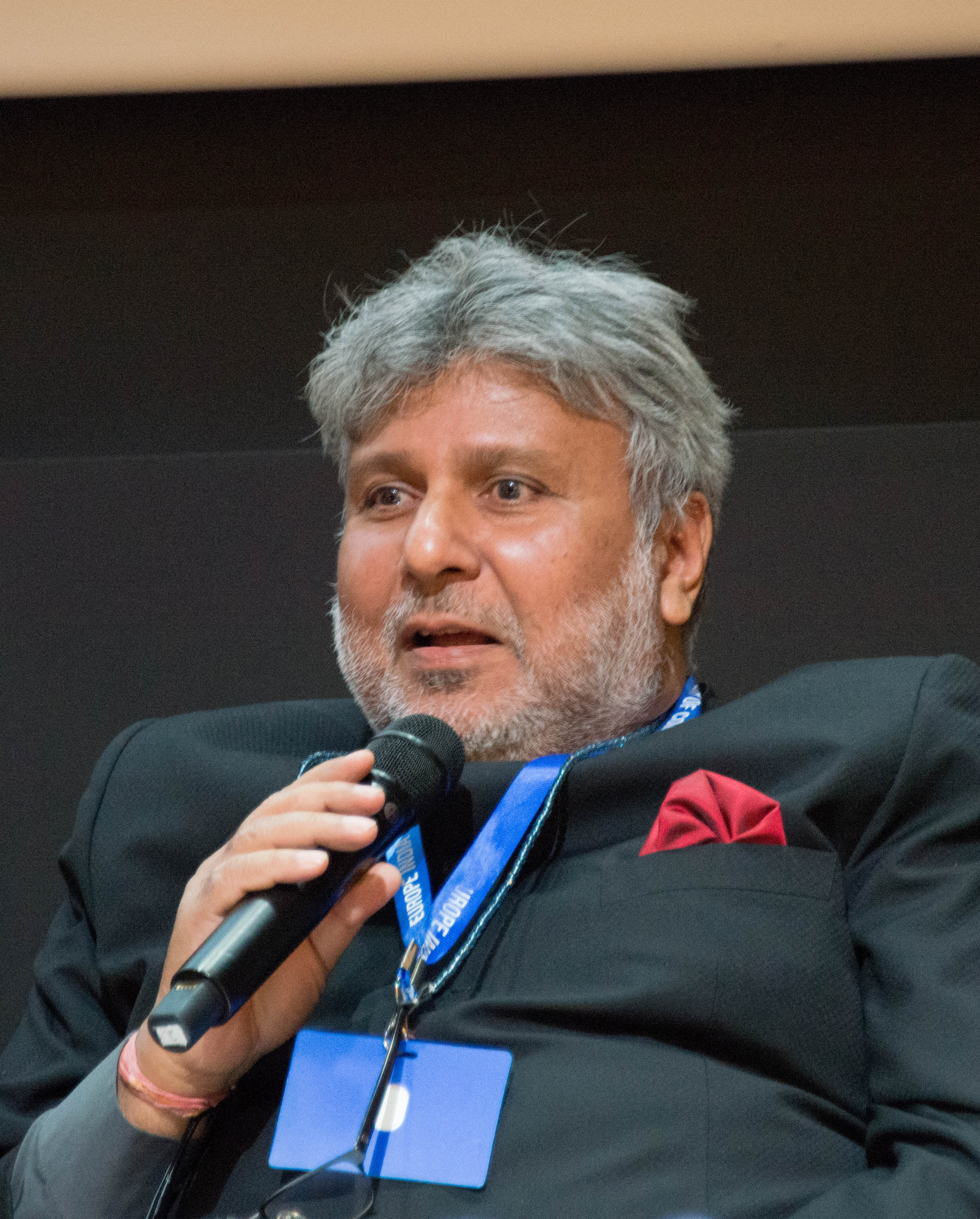
- Born: Shishir Bajoria; 1956 or 1957 (age 68–69)
- Occupation: Industrialist
- Title: Head of S K Bajoria Group
- Spouse: Smita Bajoria

Shishir Bajoria (born 1957) is an Indian politician, industrialist and the head of S K Bajoria Group, an Indian multinational with an annual turnover of US$330 million.

== Early life and education ==
Shishir Bajoria, born in Kolkata in one of the oldest Marwari families of the city, was educated at St. Xavier's College, Kolkata. He is a third generation Marwari in Kolkata. Bajoria is the youngest son of B P Bajoria, an industrialist based at Kolkata, who was non-executive director of companies including CESC Ltd, Texmaco Ltd and Kesoram Industries Ltd. B P Bajoria was also Honorary Consul General of Denmark in Kolkata and was knighted twice by the Queen of Denmark.

== Career ==
Bajoria is the promoter of the S K Bajoria Group based at Kolkata, which is engaged in diversified activities including the manufacture of specialised refractories for the steel industry, insurance broking, and third party administration for health insurance. He is the chairman of IFGL Refractories.

Bajoria is vice-chairman of the Europe India Business Council (EIBC), an international non-profit association, based in Brussels, Belgium. Bajoria is a past president of the Indian Chamber of Commerce. He has been on the board at Industrial Promotion & Investment Corporation of Orissa Ltd, and West Bengal Industrial Development Corp. Ltd.

He is the chairman, board of governors, Indian Institute of Management Shillong. In May 2020, Bajoria was appointed as a member of the executive committee of Meghalaya Chief Minister's Economic Task Force, which aims to revive the economy of the state post-COVID-19 pandemic situation.

== Politics ==
Bajoria joined the BJP in August 2014, and is a leader of the BJP in West Bengal. Since 2016, Bajoria has been on BJP's election management committee of West Bengal. Bajoria is a core committee member of BJP's foreign affairs department and Overseas Friends of BJP. Bajoria was one of those who released a statement in support of the Citizenship (Amendment) Act, 2019.

In May 2020, Bajoria wrote an open letter to Abhijit Banerjee who was appointed on the global advisory board for COVID-19 West Bengal as its chairman by West Bengal Chief Minister Mamata Banerjee.

In the 2021 West Bengal Legislative Assembly election, BJP made him the Convenor of the election management committee to oversee the elections in West Bengal, a responsibility given to the most trusted aides of the party.

Bajoria has been named in connection with the Panama Papers. He claimed that he had never owned Haptic BVI Ltd, the company of which he is listed as a beneficial owner. First Names Group, which includes Bajoria among its clients, along with Mossack Fonseca & Co, set up Haptic BVI Ltd issued a clarification through its representative stating that they made an administrative error on a form which they sent to Mossack Fonseca. The firm claimed that the erroneous beneficial owner information on the form was their own fault, as was the enclosure of the copy verification document.

== Personal life ==
Shishir Bajoria is married to Smita Bajoria, a businesswoman and owner of Ganges Art Gallery. They live in Kolkata.
