= CEVA Logistics =

Global logistics and supply chain company

- Type: Subsidiary
- Industry: Logistics
- Predecessor: TNT Logistics, EGL Eagle Global Logistics
- Founded: 2007; 19 years ago
- Headquarters: Marseille, France
- Number of locations: 1300 locations
- Area served: Worldwide
- Key people: Patrick Moebel, CEO
- Revenue: US$18.7B
- Owner: Group CMA CGM
- Number of employees: 110,000
- Website: cevalogistics.com

CEVA Logistics SA is a multinational French logistics and supply chain company founded in 2007 and headquartered in Marseille. It has been a CMA CGM subsidiary since 2019, who acquired and merged other companies into CEVA such as Ingram Micro Commerce & Lifecycle Services and GEFCO.

== History ==
Ceva Logistics was founded in 2007, as a merger of TNT Logistics and EGL Eagle Global Logistics. After the merger, CEVA Logistics became the 4th largest global third party logistics (3PL) company. Since 2014, CEVA Logistics underwent various business transformations before its IPO in 2018.

In 2016, 3PL revenues in China amounted to US$166.7 billion. Research firm Technavio positioned Ceva Logistics as the 4th largest firm with gross revenues of US$1.2 billion, net revenues of US$706 million and 1% of total market share.

In 2018, CEVA Logistics was listed on the SIX Swiss Stock Exchange. The company also acquired Spedimacc, a logistics firm specialising in the transport of fragile and valuable goods and helped Ceva Logistics reach 20% of the Italian market.

In March 2019, CEVA Logistics was acquired by the French group CMA CGM, the world's third-largest container transportation and shipping company, to complete its service range with activities in logistics. CEVA's headquarters moved from Switzerland to Marseille, France.

In 2020, the company acquired AMI Worldwide, a logistics solutions provider in Africa, offering connections with India, the Middle East, and China.

In 2021, CEVA had 98,000 employees working in 6 regions operating from 160 countries.

In 2022, CEVA Logistics finalized the acquisition of the Ingram Micro Commerce & Lifecycle Services (CLS), Colis Privé, GEFCO and Spedag Interfreight.

In 2022, CEVA Logistics announced a partnership with Ferrari as its official logistics partner, providing logistics support services for the Scuderia Ferrari cars and equipment for Grand Prix events, GT racing series, and other Ferrari Challenge events.

In March 2026 CEVA Logistics acquired Fagioli a heavylift and specialised transportation company based in Italy and operations worldwide with multiple partners in different nations. This is the second specialised transportation acquisition by CEVA after Spedag Interfreight of Kenya.

On July 29th 2026, the company had a data breach, involving personal data of customers from multiple businesses including Dutch ING Group bank, Dutch online retail platform bol, and Valve Corporation. According to reports, CEVA Logistics stored user information for 90 days, thus all orders in the 90 days prior to the hack could potentially have been affected.

In late 2024, CEVA logistics collaborated with Almajdouie Holding.
