= List of Malaysian states and municipalities by exports =

This is a list of Malaysian states, federal territories and municipalities sorted by their export value.

As of 30 October 2021, 1 Malaysian ringgit (symbol: RM, currency code: MYR) is equivalent to 0.24 US dollar or 0.21 Euros.

== Exports by state and federal territory ==
The following is a list of export values from Malaysian states and federal territories, released by the Department of Statistics Malaysia.

State or federal territory	2024 (RM million)	2023 (RM million)	2022 (RM million)	2021 (RM million)	2020 (RM million)	2019 ((RM million)	2018 (RM million)
Penang	494,917	447,431	467,616	355,591	313,842	283,972	284,741
Johor	292,671	290,047	321,985	240,790	207,200	201,798	205,064
Selangor	265,685	252,713	273,954	254,579	172,489	196,775	195,745
Sarawak	116,615	111,643	131,963	86,166	67,123	81,569	84,107
Kuala Lumpur	64,761	66,241	65,823	65,557	31,883	34,040	35,078
Kedah	58,826	61,206	54,982	40,033	27,393	27,206	24,197
Perak	41,807	32,377	37,466	39,338	30,968	28,916	29,279
Sabah	32,067	31,084	48,897	32,666	23,912	28,201	35,449
Pahang	31,424	32,733	35,707	32,640	28,483	25,399	13,151
Melaka	27,728	29,183	31,627	30,574	29,596	28,849	30,647
Negeri Sembilan	24,202	26,393	26,024	23,021	20,048	21,891	20,913
Terengganu	21,494	15,813	17,548	17,533	13,770	16,492	21,205
Labuan	7,305	16,085	23,607	10,861	5,273	7,337	6,920
Kelantan	4,079	4,101	3,747	2,734	3,638	3,282	4,246
Perlis	1,204	1,393	1,527	1,147	979	1,064	1,277
Malaysia	1,486,907	1,425,603	1,550,009	1,241,022	983,827	995,072	1,003,587

== Exports by city and municipality ==
The following is a list of export values from the busiest ports of entry in Malaysia, released by the Department of Statistics Malaysia.

City or municipality	State or federal territory	Port of entry	2023 (RM million)	2022 (RM million)	2021 (RM million)	2020 (RM million)	2019 (RM million)	2018 (RM million)
George Town	Penang	Penang International Airport	365,245	385,034	295,173	254,144	230,724	232,576
George Town	Penang	Total	365,245	385,034	295,173	254,144	230,724	232,576
Klang	Selangor	Port Klang	226,126	248,728	246,390	175,807	176,125	177,421
Klang	Selangor	Total	226,126	248,728	246,390	175,807	176,125	177,421
Iskandar Puteri	Johor	Tanjung Kupang	153,325	164,802	138,127	109,060	91,496	90,033
Iskandar Puteri	Johor	Port of Tanjung Pelepas	53,450	52,468	40,907	40,201	41,284	39,282
Iskandar Puteri	Johor	Total	206,775	217,270	179,034	149,261	132,780	129,315
Pasir Gudang	Johor	Johor Port	89,603	104,949	85,920	62,819	64,560	69,563
Pasir Gudang	Johor	Tanjung Langsat Port	30,707	49,581	24,964	16,724	24,174	40,384
Pasir Gudang	Johor	Total	120,310	154,530	110,884	79,543	88,734	109,947
Sepang	Selangor	Kuala Lumpur International Airport	95,114	102,738	78,943	60,689	71,090	78,366
Sepang	Selangor	Total	95,114	102,738	78,943	60,689	71,090	78,366
Bintulu	Sarawak	Bintulu	91,691	111,525	70,166	53,970	66,957	69,769
Bintulu	Sarawak	Total	91,691	111,525	70,166	53,970	66,957	69,769
Seberang Perai	Penang	Port of Penang	69,490	65,715	59,326	56,766	60,537	56,261
Seberang Perai	Penang	Total	69,490	65,715	59,326	56,766	60,537	56,261
Kuantan	Pahang	Kuantan Port Sultan Haji Ahmad Shah Airport	30,310	32,360	31,696	25,667	21,850	9,080
Kuantan	Pahang	Total	30,310	32,360	31,696	25,667	21,850	9,080
Kubang Pasu	Kedah	Bukit Kayu Hitam	16,523	20,598	19,759	15,511	20,363	20,005
Kubang Pasu	Kedah	Total	16,523	20,598	19,759	15,511	20,363	20,005
Johor Bahru	Johor	Johor–Singapore Causeway	14,751	16,384	11,881	11,453	15,817	17,653
Johor Bahru	Johor	Total	14,751	16,384	11,881	11,453	15,817	17,653
Malaysia		Total	1,425,603	1,550,009	1,241,022	983,827	995,072	1,003,587

== See also ==
- Economy of Malaysia
