= Penang International Airport =

Airport serving the Malaysian state of Penang

Penang International Airport Lapangan Terbang Antarabangsa Pulau Pinang
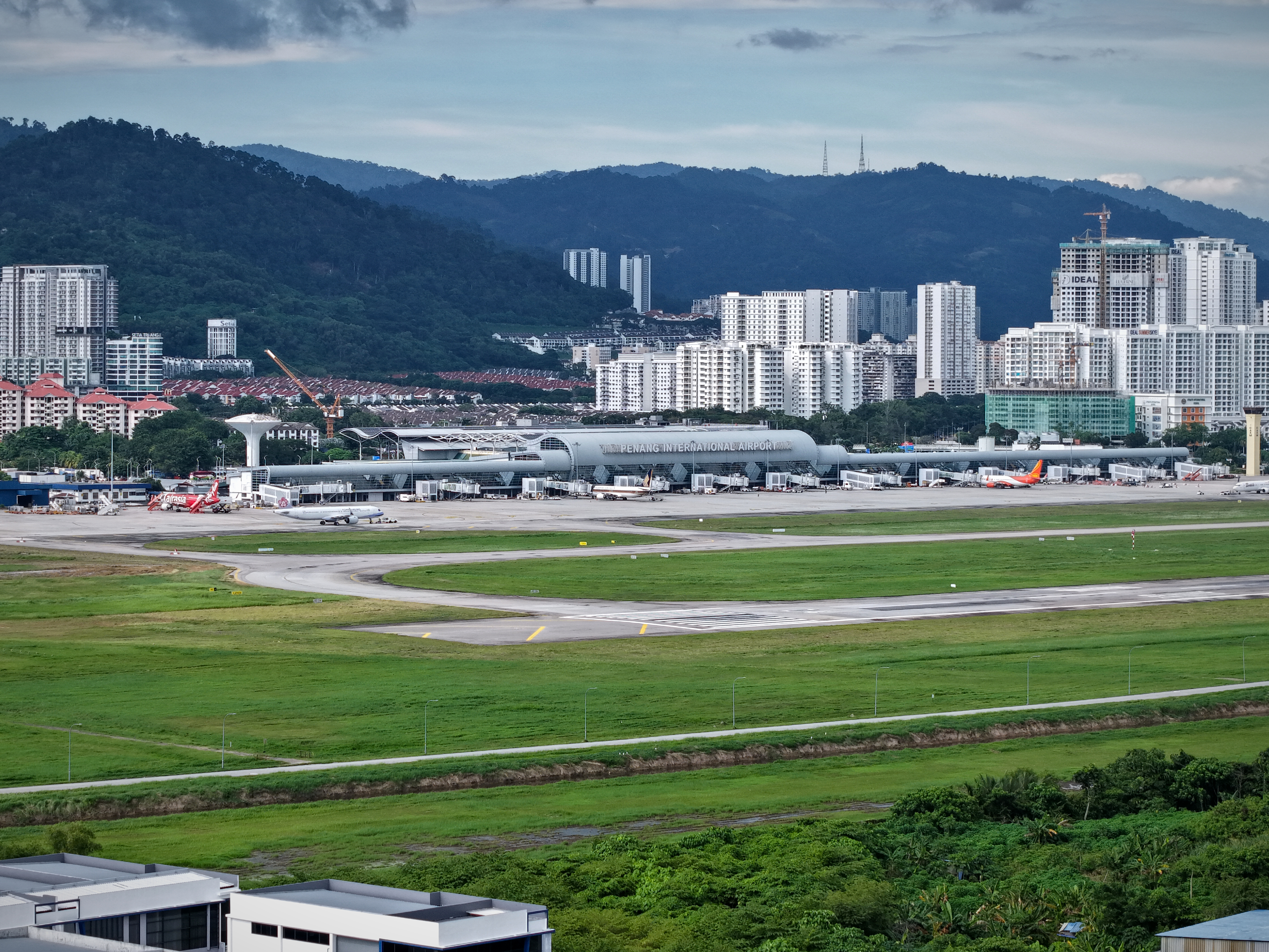
- IATA: PEN; ICAO: WMKP; WMO: 48601

Summary
- Airport type: Public
- Owner/Operator: Malaysia Airports
- Serves: George Town Conurbation
- Location: Bayan Lepas, George Town, Penang, Malaysia
- Opened: 29 September 1935; 91 years ago
- Hub for: Firefly
- Operating base for: AirAsia
- Time zone: MST (UTC+08:00)
- Elevation AMSL: 11 ft (3.4 m)
- Coordinates: 05°17′49.7″N 100°16′36.71″E
- Website: airports.malaysiaairports.com.my/penang

Map
- Location in George Town Location in West Malaysia Location in Malaysia Location in Southeast Asia

Runways
Direction	Length		Surface
Direction	m	ft	Surface
04/22	3,354	11,004	Asphalt

Statistics (2025)
- Passenger: 8,269,978 (▲7.97%)
- Airfreight (tonnes): 103,423 (▼13.8%)
- Aircraft movements: 64,507 (▲3.8%)

Penang International Airport (PIA) (IATA: PEN, ICAO: WMKP) is an international airport in George Town, the capital city of the Malaysian state of Penang. The airport is located at the southeastern tip of Penang Island, 16 km (9.9 mi) south of the city centre, and serves the country's second largest conurbation.

As the main gateway into northwestern Malaysia, PIA is the third busiest airport in Malaysia by aircraft movements and recorded over 7.6 million tourist arrivals in 2024. It also handled the second largest cargo tonnage of all airports in the country and the highest in terms of export value, with RM365 billion in exports in 2023. Additionally, the airport is the main hub for local budget airline Firefly and one of AirAsia's operating bases.

== History ==
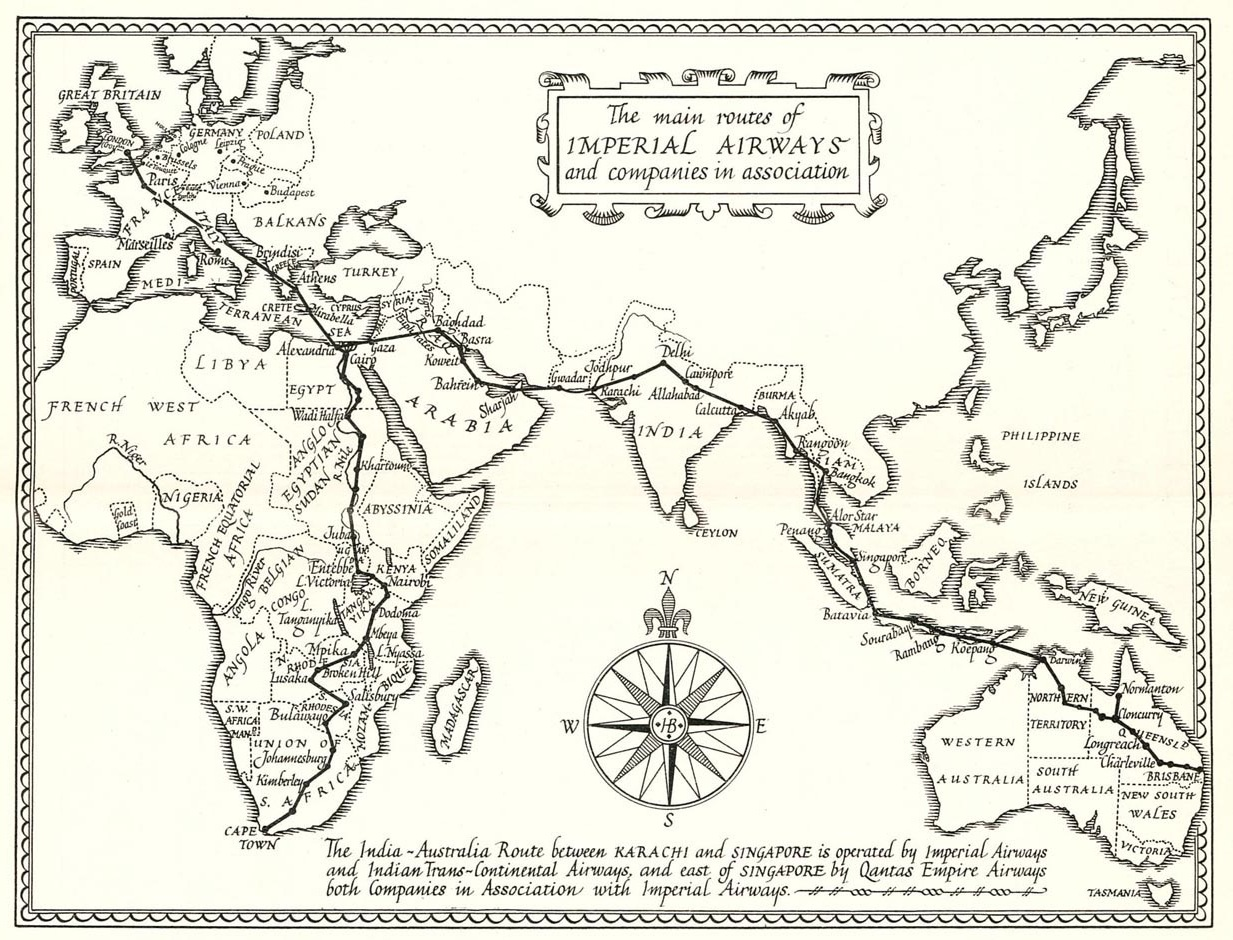
A 1935 map depicting routes of the Imperial Airways, which included Penang

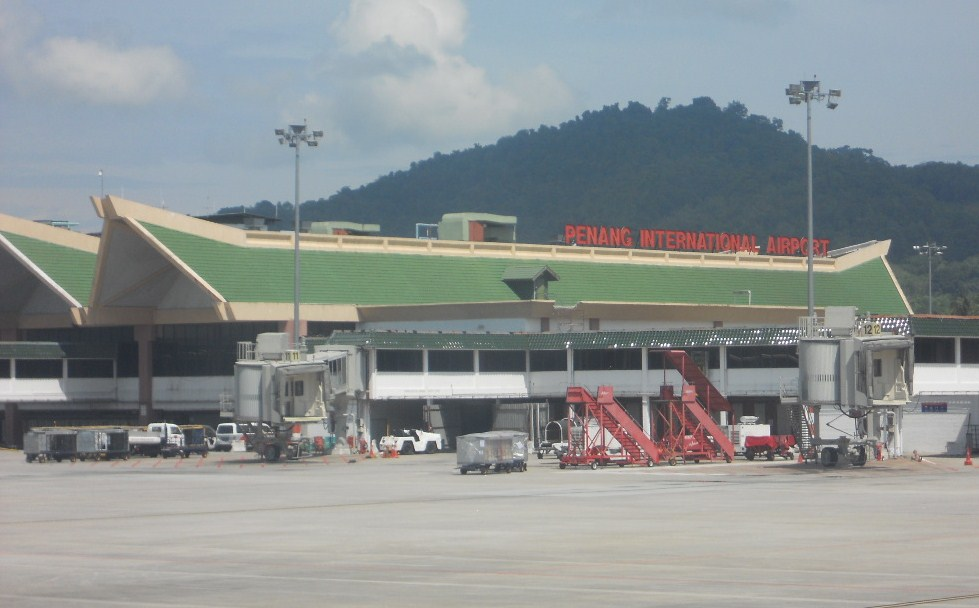
Penang International Airport terminal c. 2011. The terminal building underwent an overhaul by 2012.

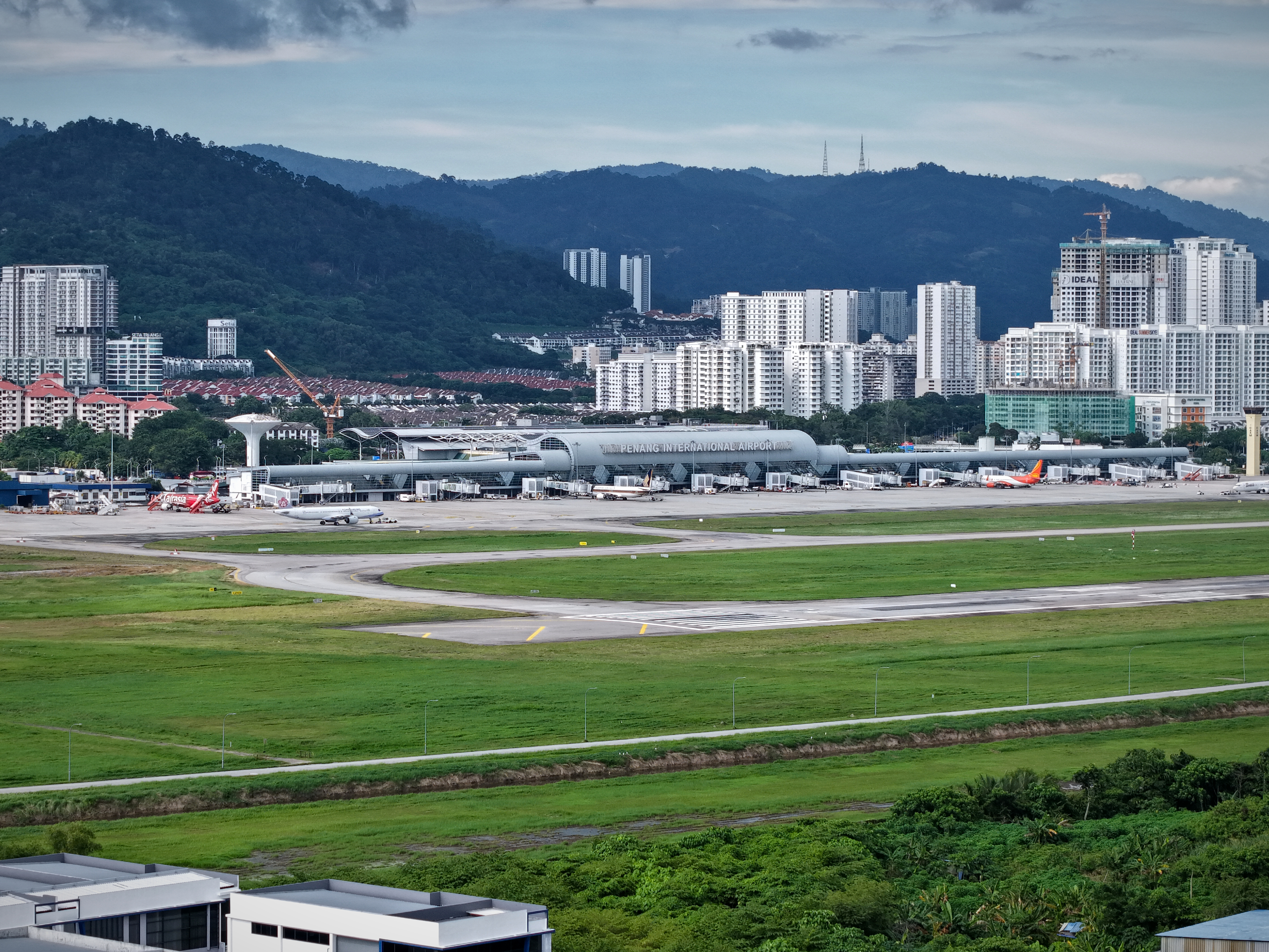
Aerial view of Penang International Airport, with the suburban skyline of Bayan Lepas forming the background.

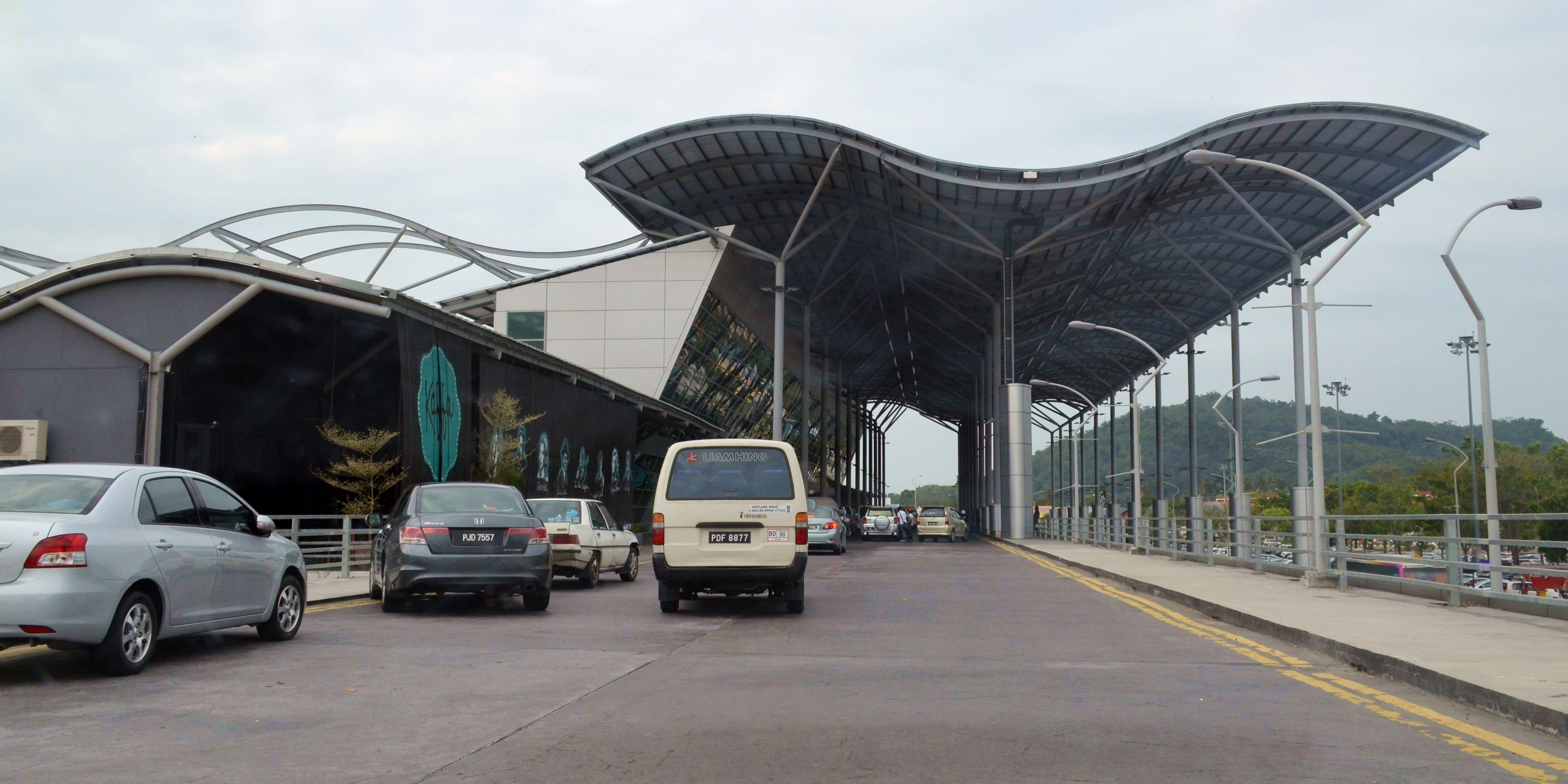
Entrance to Penang International Airport terminal, c. 2012

The airport, then named Bayan Lepas International Airport, was completed in 1935, when Penang was part of the British crown colony of the Straits Settlements. Governor of the Straits Settlements Cecil Clementi had overseen the nascent aviation development in Malaya. Under his administration, aerodromes were built at Bayan Lepas and Kallang, Singapore.

The Bayan Lepas airport was constructed on mudflats, which necessitated the installation of concrete runways to ensure all-weather operational capabilities. Kallang airport was regarded as the "finest" in the Far East at that time, while the Bayan Lepas airport was perceived as Malaya's "second airport", enjoying advantages such as closer proximity to Indochina and East Asia compared to Kallang.

As early as 1938, the Straits Settlements government estimated that an additional 10 acres (4.0 ha) was necessary for the expansion of the Bayan Lepas airport. At the time, the airport served both civilian air traffic and the Royal Air Force (RAF). At the onset of World War II, the Straits Settlements imposed regulations to manage air traffic in Penang, designating specific corridors for aircraft overflying the colony. The Bayan Lepas airport, along with the Butterworth air base, was subjected to aerial attacks by Japanese forces in December 1941.

Following the independence of Malaya, transportation infrastructure throughout the new federation falls under the purview of the federal government. In 1967, the federal government announced an allocation of $2.3 million (Malaya and British Borneo dollar) to expand the Bayan Lepas airport. The expansion was carried out in the 1970s, during which a terminal building of Minangkabau architecture was built and the runway extended to accommodate Boeing 747s, then the largest passenger jet aircraft. Upon the completion of the expansion works in 1979, the airport was renamed Penang International Airport (PIA). The airport's new terminal increased its annual passenger capacity to 1.5 million.

The development of the adjacent Bayan Lepas Free Industrial Zone enhanced the PIA's role as a logistics hub. However, the surging cargo tonnage resulting from industrial demand prompted the Penang state government, under Chief Minister Koh Tsu Koon, to propose a new, larger airport in Seberang Perai in 1993 to accommodate the increase in air traffic. In 1997, then Malaysian Prime Minister Mahathir Mohamad announced plans to build a new airport in neighbouring Kedah and close the PIA, overlooking Koh's earlier proposals for the Seberang Perai airport. Fearing potential backlash from local civil societies and the opposition Democratic Action Party (DAP), Mahathir later relented, stating that the PIA would "still be maintained if investors need it". The PIA was expanded in 1998 to accommodate 3.5 million passengers yearly.

The airport was further expanded in 2012, increasing its capacity to 6.5 million passengers per year. Nonetheless, it remained a source of contention between the Penang and federal governments after Pakatan Rakyat (now Pakatan Harapan) – which included the DAP – gained control of the state in 2008. Calls by the Penang state government for further expansion of the PIA were ignored, even though passenger traffic quickly surpassed the airport's new capacity of 6.5 million. The then Chief Minister Lim Guan Eng raised concerns that the federal government lacked urgency regarding the issue, as it was still considering the proposal for a new airport in Kedah.

It was not until 2017 when the federal government announced plans to expand the PIA to accommodate 12 million passengers per year by 2028. While the planned expansion met with delays due to the COVID-19 pandemic, in 2023, the federal government approved an allocation of RM93 million to facilitate land acquisition and infrastructure development for the airport's expansion. Costing RM1.5 billion, the PIA's expansion includes the addition of new infrastructure, such as the first Mitsui outlet mall outside the Klang Valley, and upgrades to the main terminal and apron, which will increase the aircraft capacity from 16 to 28 at any given time. The Mutiara line, a light rail system expected to be completed by 2031, will also include a station near the airport.

== Airlines and destinations ==
=== Passenger ===
Airlines	Destinations
9 Air	Charter: Haikou
AirAsia	Ho Chi Minh City, Jakarta–Soekarno-Hatta, Johor Bahru, Kota Kinabalu, Kuala Lumpur–International, Kuching, Langkawi, Phuket, Singapore
Batik Air Malaysia	Batam, Jakarta–Soekarno-Hatta (resumes 1 December 2026), Kuala Lumpur–International, Kuala Lumpur–Subang, Medan (resumes 4 December 2026), Singapore; Charter: Kunming, Osaka–Kansai (begins 30 December 2026)
Berjaya Air	Seasonal: Redang
Cathay Pacific	Hong Kong
China Airlines	Taipei–Taoyuan
China Southern Airlines	Guangzhou
Chongqing Airlines	Chongqing
Firefly	Banda Aceh, Haikou, Kota Bharu, Kuala Lumpur–International, Kuala Lumpur–Subang, Langkawi, Phuket
Flydubai	Dubai–International^{1}
Hainan Airlines	Haikou
HK Express	Hong Kong
IndiGo	Chennai
Indonesia AirAsia	Jakarta–Soekarno-Hatta, Medan, Surabaya
Juneyao Air	Shanghai–Pudong
Lion Air	Medan
LOT Polish Airlines	Seasonal charter: Warsaw–Chopin
Malaysia Airlines	Kuala Lumpur–International
Myanmar Airways International	Yangon
Qatar Airways	Seasonal: Doha^{2}
Qingdao Airlines	Qingdao
Scoot	Singapore
Shanghai Airlines	Shanghai–Pudong
Shenzhen Airlines	Shenzhen
Sichuan Airlines	Chengdu–Tianfu
Singapore Airlines	Singapore
Spring Airlines	Guangzhou, Shanghai–Pudong
Thai AirAsia	Bangkok–Don Mueang
Thai Airways International	Bangkok–Suvarnabhumi
Thai Lion Air	Bangkok–Don Mueang
TransNusa	Jakarta–Soekarno-Hatta
XiamenAir	Xiamen

^{1}: This flight originates and ends at Langkawi. However, the airline has no eighth-freedom rights to transport passengers solely between Penang and Langkawi.

^{2}: This flight operates with a stop at Phuket. However, the airline has no fifth-freedom rights to transport passengers solely between Penang and Phuket.

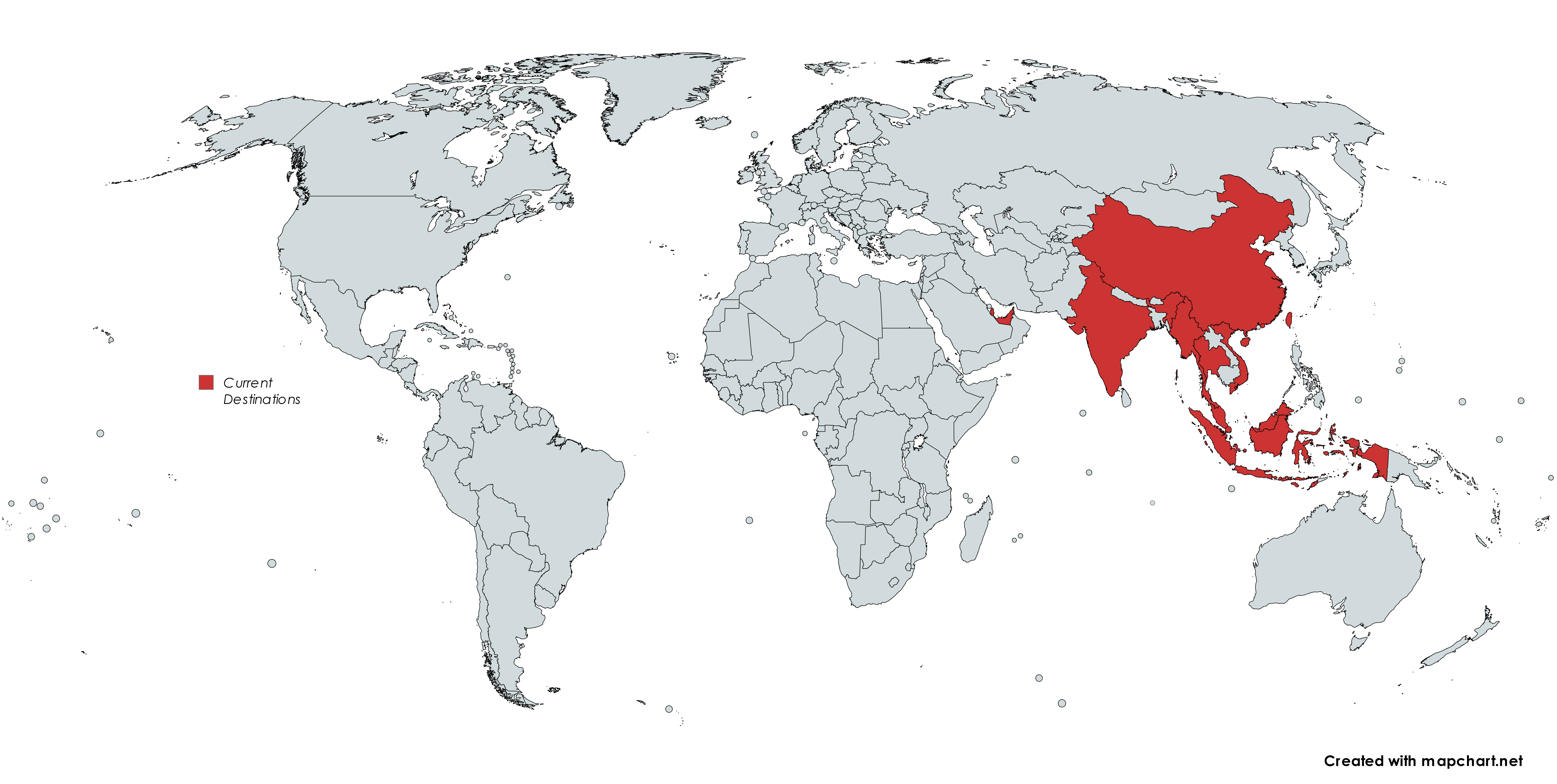
Penang Airport passenger destinations as of April 2026

== Statistics ==
Passenger destinations of the Penang International Airport (PEN) as of June 2025

PIA is the second busiest airport in Malaysia in terms of aircraft movements after Kuala Lumpur International Airport (KLIA). The airport experienced its peak passenger traffic of 8.3 million in 2019, surpassing its annual capacity of 6.5 million passengers, before the outbreak of COVID-19 caused global disruptions in air travel. In 2024, PIA recorded over 7.6 million passengers, compared to nearly 6.8 million in 2023.

The PIA–KLIA route is one of the busiest air corridors in Malaysia, having flown 2.2 million passengers in 2019. Additionally, the PIA–Changi corridor is the third busiest among Malaysia's ASEAN routes, with about 800,000 passengers flown in the first nine months of 2023.

While it processes the second largest cargo tonnage after KLIA, in terms of export value, PIA's is the highest of all Malaysian airports, with RM365 billion worth of exports passing through PIA in 2023 alone.

Operational statistics (2014–2024)
Year	Passengers handled	Passenger % change	Cargo (tonnes)	Cargo % change	Aircraft movements	Aircraft % change
2014	6,041,583	Steady	141,213	Steady	63,396	Steady
2015	6,258,756	▲3.6	130,392	▼7.7	64,527	▲1.8
2016	6,684,026	▲6.8	130,491	▲0.1	64,428	▼0.2
2017	7,232,097	▲8.2	134,187	▲2.8	69,157	▲7.3
2018	7,790,423	▲7.7	145,649	▲8.5	73,462	▲6.2
2019	8,331,291	▲6.9	139,646	▼4.1	78,400	▲6.7
2020	1,826,121	▼78.1	137,685	▼1.4	28,497	▼63.7
2021	542,681	▼70.3	153,782	▲11.7	15,978	▼43.9
2022	4,275,791	▲687.9	162,048	▲5.4	46,257	▲189.5
2023	6,789,712	▲58.6	119,919	▼26.0	59,578	▲28.8
2024	7,658,978	▲12.8	103,423	▼13.8	64,507	▲8.3
Source: Malaysia Airports Holdings Berhad, Ministry of Transport, Civil Aviation Authority of Malaysia

Top 10 nationalities of international arrivals
Nationality	Total		% change
Nationality	2024	2023	% change
Indonesia	369,088	345,786	6.74%
Singapore	177,882	186,253	-4.55%
China	120,245	37,771	218.86%
Taiwan	42,035	35,223	19.34%
Thailand	30,589	21,652	41.28%
USA	21,652	20,601	3.99%
United Kingdom	19,707	15,500	27.14%
Australia	17,699	16,986	4.20%
Japan	15,243	13,285	14.74%
Vietnam	12,443	11,615	-
Total	956,940	662,107	69.19%
Source: Tourism Malaysia			

== Ground transportation ==
Rapid Penang has provided four bus routes to and from Penang International Airport, connecting the airport with various parts of George Town.

== Incidents ==
- 28 March 1981: The hijacked Garuda Indonesian Airways Flight 206 refueled at Penang International Airport, during which the hijackers removed one of the passengers from the aircraft. The plane subsequently proceeded to Don Mueang International Airport in Bangkok, where a standoff ensued with Thai authorities before the eventual storming by Indonesian special forces.
- 9 November 1985: Drug traffickers Kevin J. Barlow and Brian G. S. Chambers were arrested at the airport while attempting to smuggle heroin into Australia. Both were later sentenced to death.
