= Osram Opto Semiconductors GmbH =

German semiconductor manufacturer

Osram Opto Semiconductors GmbH of Regensburg, Germany, was a wholly owned subsidiary of Osram GmbH, which was the world's second largest manufacturer of optoelectronic semiconductors after Nichia and followed in third place by Cree Inc. The company was founded in 1999 as a joint venture between Osram and Infineon Technologies. In 2021 Osram Opto Semiconductors was integrated to AMS-Osram International GmbH and is now part of the AMS Osram Group.

The main products of the company are light-emitting diodes (LEDs) as well as high power laser diodes, infrared components and optical sensors.

== History ==
In January 1999, Siemens split off its semiconductor operations, and Osram acquired a 51% majority share in the light-emitting diode (LED) division.

The Siemens subsidiary, Infineon, initially retained a 49% share. In the summer of 2001, Osram acquired all Infineon shares in the sale of opto-semiconductors.

In 2003, the company opened an opto-chip factory in Regensburg, Germany. After a construction period of 21 months, the first phase of the factory opened, covering an area of 36,000 m². Total investment was around €120 million. The second phase was officially opened in 2008.

== Profile ==
The company produces optoelectronic semiconductors for the illumination, sensing, and visualization sectors. It has headquarters in Regensburg, Germany, additional manufacturing operations in Penang and Kulim (Malaysia) and Wuxi (China), and employs more than 6,000 people. In the fiscal year 2010, the optoelectronic semiconductor business activity accounts for twenty percent of overall Osram GmbH sales.

The semiconductor products of Osram Opto Semiconductors include visible-light LEDs; high-performance infrared LEDs; optoelectronic detectors, and semiconductor lasers. All the components are sold in various output categories with different brightness levels; sizes, and package formats.

In 2009, the company began manufacturing organic light-emitting diode (OLED) light sources.

== Products ==
• Illumination LEDs from OSRAM have been used in the automotive sector for a number of years. The company supplies components for automotive dashboard lighting and headlights. Its high-power LEDs are used in general lighting, projection, rear-projection television (RPTV), and infrared systems.

• Visualization Monochrome LEDs are used as points of light on information panels. Multicolor LEDs such as MultiLED cover the entire color triangle and are used in large-format displays at rock concerts, sports stadiums and trade fairs. The range of applications for LEDs includes screens of all sizes from small (for example for satnav systems, LCD monitors, mobile phones and other mobile terminals) to very large (102“ diagonal and higher). Small displays are also available with OLED backlighting. For projection applications the company will be using laser technology in addition to LEDs.

In December 2010, researchers at the company received the Karl Heinz Beckurts Prize for development work on direct green semiconductor lasers.

The company's semiconductor line includes surface-mount technology (SMT) and through-hole LEDs, silicon photodetectors, optical sensors, infrared emitters, and high-power laser diodes.
