= Piktochart =

Web-based graphic design tool

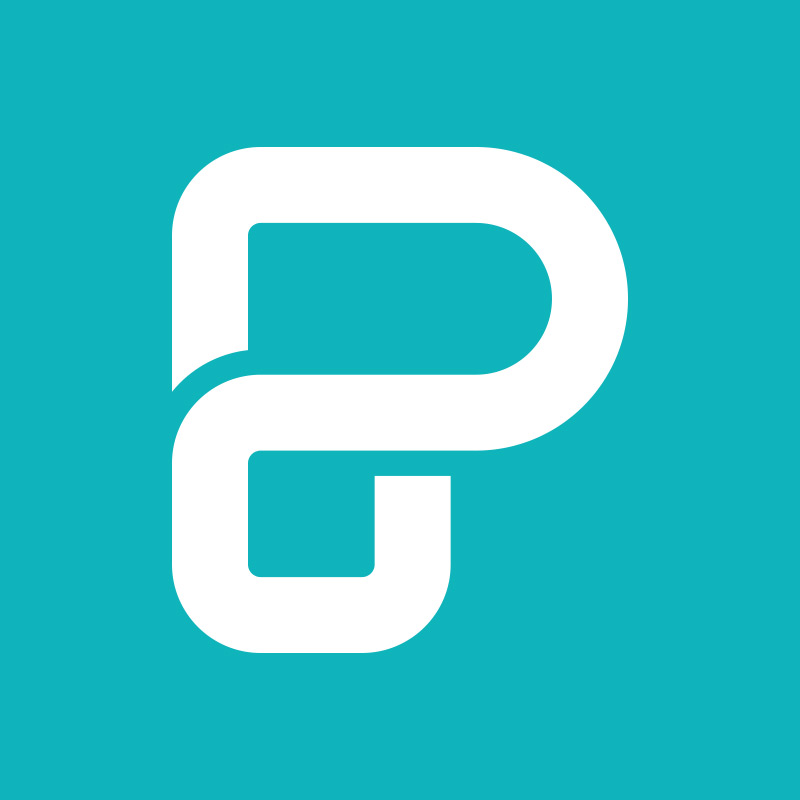
- Developer: Piktochart
- Platform: Web (works best on Chrome and Firefox)
- Type: Infographic software
- Website: www.piktochart.com

Piktochart is a web-based graphic design tool and infographic maker.

== History ==
Piktochart was launched in March 2012 and is based in Malaysia. By the end of the year, it had over 170,000 users and received a $140,000 grant from the Malaysian government.

== See also ==
- Design
- Data visualization
- Poster
