= Penang =

State in Malaysia

Penang Pulau Pinang
- State
- State of Penang; Negeri Pulau Pinang (Malay)
- Flag Coat of arms
- Etymology: Areca nut
- Nickname(s): Pulau Mutiara (English: Island of Pearl); Mutiara Timur (English: Pearl of the Orient)
- Motto: Bersatu dan Setia (English: "United and Loyal")
- Anthem: Untuk Negeri Kita (English: "For Our State")
- Penang in Malaysia
- Country: Malaysia
- Founded by the British East India Company: 11 August 1786
- Straits Settlements: 1 April 1867 – 1 April 1946
- Japanese occupation: 19 December 1941 – 3 September 1945
- Malayan Union: 1 April 1946
- Federation of Malaya: 31 August 1957
- Proclamation of Malaysia: 16 September 1963
- Capital: George Town; 05°24′52″N 100°19′45″E
- Largest city: Seberang Perai
- Ethnic groups (2020): 41.3% Chinese; 41.1% Bumiputera; 40.7% Malay; 0.5% indigenous groups from Sabah and Sarawak; 8.9% Indian; 0.6% Other ethnicities; 8.1% Non-citizens
- Religion (2020): 45.5% Sunni Islam (official); 37.6% Buddhism; 8.4% Hinduism; 4.3% Christianity; 2.4% Other religions; 1.7% No religion
- Demonym(s): Penangite
- Government: Parliamentary
  - Governor: Ramli Ngah Talib
  - Chief Minister: Chow Kon Yeow (PH–DAP)
- Legislature: Legislative Assembly

Area
  - Total: 1,049 km^{2} (405 sq mi) (12th)
- Elevation: 24 m (79 ft)
- Highest elevation (Penang Hill): 833 m (2,733 ft)

Population
  - 2020 census: 1,740,405
  - Density: 1,659.11/km^{2} (4,297.1/sq mi) (3rd)
- GDP (PPP): 2025 estimate
  - Total: $109,790 million (5th)
  - Per capita: $59,451 (3rd)
- GDP (nominal): 2025 estimate
  - Total: $34,887 million (5th)
  - Per capita: $18,828 (3rd)
- Gini (2022): ▲0.371 low
- HDI (2024): ▲0.849 very high · 4th
- Currency: Malaysian ringgit (RM/MYR)
- Time zone: UTC+8 (Malaysian Time)
- Date format: dd-mm-yyyy
- Driving side: Left
- Calling code: +604-2, +604-6, +604-8 (George Town) +604-3, +604-5 (Seberang Perai)
- Postal code: 10xxx–11xxx (George Town); 12xxx-14xxx (Seberang Perai)
- ISO 3166 code: MY-07
- Website: www.penang.gov.my

Penang (Note: Malay: Pulau Pinang; Malay pronunciation: [pi.naŋ]) is a Malaysian state located on the northwest coast of Peninsular Malaysia. It is divided into two parts by the Penang Strait: Penang Island to the west, where the capital city George Town is located, and Seberang Perai on the mainland Malay Peninsula to the east. These two halves are physically connected by the Penang Bridge and the Second Penang Bridge. The state shares borders with Kedah to the north and east, and Perak to the south.

Penang is one of Malaysia's most developed economic powerhouses, with the second highest GDP per capita of all states. It also ranks fifth among the states in terms of average wages. Penang is Malaysia's leading exporter with nearly RM495 billion (US$119.57 billion) in exports in 2024, primarily through the Penang International Airport which is also the nation's second busiest by aircraft movements.

The Port of Penang was established by Francis Light as a free port in 1786 alongside the capital, George Town. Penang subsequently became part of the Straits Settlements, a British crown colony also comprising Malacca and Singapore. During World War II, Japan occupied Penang, but the British regained control in 1945. Penang was later merged with the Federation of Malaya (now Malaysia), which gained independence in 1957. Penang's economy shifted from entrepôt trade to electronics manufacturing and the tertiary sector throughout the late 20th century.

With 1.74 million residents and a population density of 1,659/km^{2} (4,300/sq mi) as of 2020, Penang is Malaysia's most densely populated state, (Note: The Federal Territories of Kuala Lumpur and Putrajaya have a higher population density; however, they are not classified as states.) and one of the most urbanised. Seberang Perai is Malaysia's third largest city by population. Penang is culturally diverse with a population that includes Chinese, Malays, Indians, Eurasians, Siamese and expatriates.

== Etymology ==
Fruit cluster of the areca or pinang palm, the state's namesake also depicted in its flag.

The name Penang comes from the Malay name Pulau Pinang which means 'areca [palm] island'. Maritime explorers also took note of the island's abundance of areca palms in their recorded toponyms: during the 15th century, Admiral Zheng He of Ming China referred to the island as 檳榔嶼 Bīngláng Yǔ (Note: in simplified characters: 槟榔屿; Pe̍h-ōe-jī: Pin-nn̂g sū; lit. 'areca nut island') in his navigational charts. Portuguese cartographer Manuel Godinho de Erédia's Description of Malacca named it Pulo Pinaom. The Siamese, who were the overlords of Kedah, called it Ko Mak (Thai: เกาะหมาก) with the same meaning.

Over the course of history, Penang Island had been known by different names by seafarers from various regions. The locals named it Pulo Ka Satu (modern Malay: Pulau Kesatu), meaning "The First Island", as it was the largest island on the maritime route between Lingga and Kedah.

Penang is also colloquially referred to as the "Pearl of the Orient" and "The Island of Pearls" (Malay: Pulau Mutiara).

== History ==
Historical affiliations

British East India Company 1786–1858
British Raj 1858–1867
Straits Settlements 1826–1941; 1945–1946
Empire of Japan 1941–1945
Malayan Union 1946–1948
Federation of Malaya 1948–1963
Malaysia 1963–present

=== Early history ===
Archaeologists have discovered human remains such as the "Penang Woman", along with seashells, pottery and stone tools, in Seberang Perai. The artefacts indicate that around 5,000 to 6,000 years ago, Penang was inhabited by nomadic Melanesians during the Neolithic era. The indigenous Semang people of Penang died out in the early 20th century.

Pali inscriptions on the Cherok Tok Kun megalith suggest the Hindu-Buddhist Bujang Valley civilisation, based in present-day Kedah, held authority over parts of Seberang Perai by the 6th century. The entirety of Penang later formed part of Kedah, which came under Siamese suzerainty by the late 18th century.

=== Establishment and British rule ===
British acquisition and expansion of Penang (in yellow) occurred between 1786 and 1874, when the final alterations to Penang's boundaries were enacted.

The British first arrived in Penang in 1592. However, Penang's modern history only began in 1786 when Francis Light, a representative of the British East India Company (EIC), obtained Penang Island from Sultan Abdullah Mukarram Shah of Kedah in exchange for military aid. Light had been sent to the Malay Peninsula by the EIC to build trade relations in the region, where he saw the strategic potential of Penang Island as a "convenient magazine for trade" that could enable the British to check Dutch and French territorial ambitions in Southeast Asia.

After negotiating an agreement with the Sultan, Light and his entourage landed on Penang Island on 17 July that year and took formal possession of the island "in the name of King George III of England" on 11 August. The island was renamed Prince of Wales Island after the heir to the British throne and the new settlement of George Town was established in honour of King George III.

Unbeknownst to Sultan Abdullah, Light had acted without the authority or the consent of his superiors in India. When the EIC reneged on military protection, the Sultan launched an attempt to recapture the Prince of Wales Island in 1791. However, the attempt was defeated by EIC forces and the Sultan sued for peace. An annual payment of 6,000 Spanish dollars was agreed in exchange for British sovereignty over the island.

In 1800, Lieutenant-Governor George Leith secured a strip of hinterland across the Penang Strait, which was subsequently named Province Wellesley (now Seberang Perai). The EIC gained permanent sovereignty over both Prince of Wales Island and the new mainland territory, while the annual payment to the Sultan of Kedah was increased to 10,000 Spanish dollars. The British government and, subsequently, the Malaysian government maintained the annual payments to Kedah until 2018, when the Malaysian federal government increased the amount by RM10 million yearly.

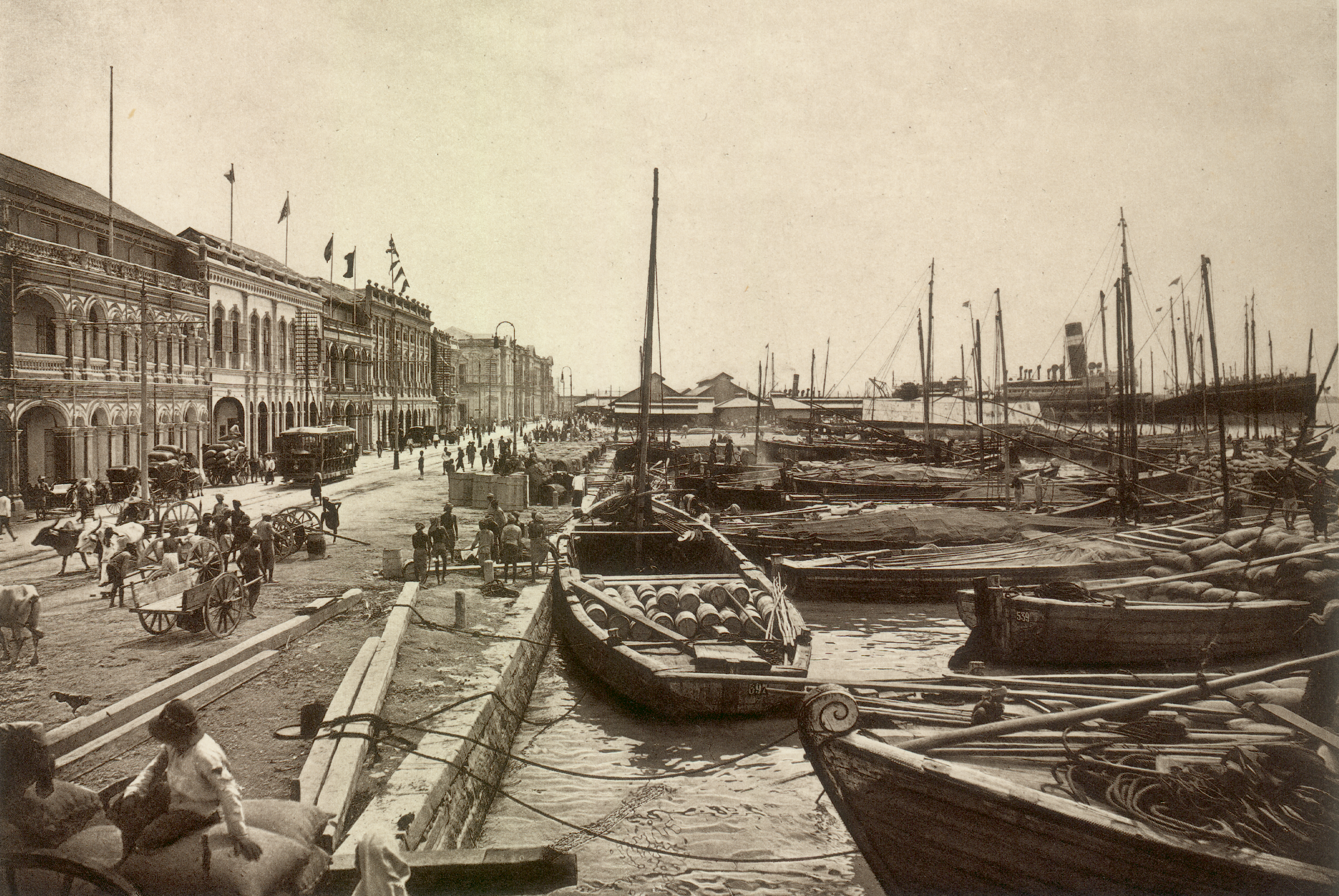
The Port of Penang in George Town c. 1910. Port functions were eventually relocated to Seberang Perai in 1974.

George Town grew rapidly as a free port and a conduit for spice trade, diverting maritime commerce away from Dutch outposts in the region. In 1805, Penang became a separate presidency of British India, sharing similar status with Bombay and Madras. By 1808, George Town had established its local government, while the founding of the Supreme Court of Penang marked the birth of Malaysia's modern judiciary. In 1826, George Town was made the capital of the Straits Settlements which included Singapore and Malacca. As Singapore soon supplanted George Town as the region's premier entrepôt, Singapore became the capital instead in 1832.

Despite its secondary importance to Singapore, George Town retained its importance as a vital British entrepôt. Towards the end of the 19th century, it became a major tin exporter and Malaya's primary financial centre. Penang's prosperity attracted a cosmopolitan population comprising Chinese, Malay, Indian, Peranakan, Siamese and migrants of mixed European-Asian lineage referred to as "Eurasians", and led to the development of hitherto rural areas such as Butterworth and Bukit Mertajam. However, the population growth created social problems such as inadequate sanitation, health facilities and rampant crime, culminating in street violence and rioting in 1867.

The Straits Settlements became a British crown colony within the same year. Direct British rule led to improved law enforcement, and investments in health care and public transportation in Penang. Due to the active participation of Asian residents in municipal and broader political affairs, as well as greater press freedoms, George Town was perceived as being more intellectually receptive than Singapore, which was often viewed as being overly pro-British and having lower levels of Asian political engagement. The settlement attracted various intellectuals and revolutionaries, including visits by Rudyard Kipling, Somerset Maugham, and Sun Yat-sen. Sun famously planned the Xinhai Revolution from Penang after relocating the headquarters of the Tongmenghui to George Town in 1910. The organisation had originally moved its regional operations from British Hong Kong to Singapore in 1906, before relocating again to Penang due to increased pressure from the British. Sun ultimately used George Town as the centre for the Tongmenghui's political activities in Southeast Asia, aiming to overthrow the Qing dynasty.

=== World wars ===
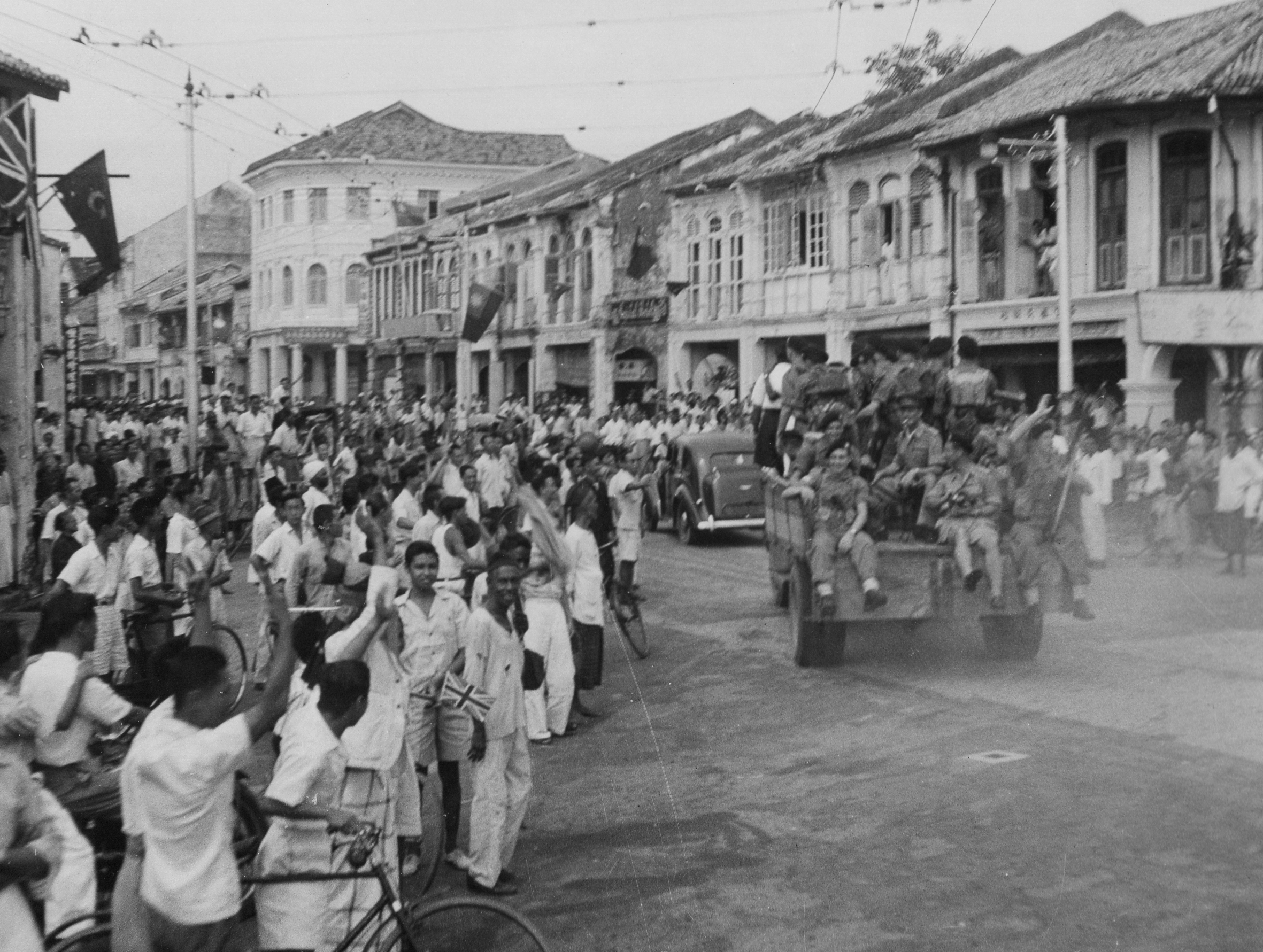
Royal Marines parading through a liberated George Town, 3 September 1945

Penang emerged from World War I relatively unscathed, apart from the Battle of Penang during which the Imperial German Navy cruiser SMS Emden sank two Allied warships off George Town. During the interwar years, the British had acknowledged the need to fortify their armed forces in northern Malaya. However, complacency and lack of resources left British forces ill-prepared to confront the Japanese invasion at the onset of the Pacific War. Although Penang Island had been designated as a fortress, Penang fell without struggle to the Imperial Japanese Army on 19 December 1941 after daily aerial attacks. The British covertly evacuated Penang's European populace; historian Raymond Callahan since contended that "the moral collapse of British rule in Southeast Asia came not at Singapore, but at Penang".

Penang Island was subsequently renamed Tojo-to after Prime Minister Hideki Tojo. Japanese military police imposed order by massacring Chinese civilians under the Sook Ching policy, while women were forced into sexual slavery. Swettenham Pier was converted into a major submarine base by the Axis Powers.

Between 1944 and 1945, Allied bombers from India targeted naval and administrative buildings in George Town, damaging and destroying several colonial buildings in the process. The Penang Strait was mined to restrict Japanese shipping. Following Japan's surrender, George Town was the first Malayan settlement liberated by British marines through Operation Jurist on 3 September 1945.

=== Post-war years ===
Penang was placed under British military administration until 1946, after which the Straits Settlements was abolished. The British sought to consolidate the various political entities in British Malaya, including the Crown Colony of Penang, under a single polity known as the Malayan Union. Initially, the impending annexation of Penang into the vast Malay heartland proved unpopular among Penangites. The Penang Secessionist Committee was formed in 1948 due to economic and ethnic concerns, but their attempt to avert Penang's merger with Malaya was unsuccessful due to British disapproval.

To relieve the concerns raised by the secessionists, the British government guaranteed George Town's free port status and reintroduced municipal elections in 1951. George Town became the first fully-elected municipality in Malaya by 1956 and was granted city status by Queen Elizabeth II in the following year. This made George Town the first city within the Federation of Malaya, and by extension, Malaysia.

=== Post-independence era ===
George Town's status as a free port was rescinded by the Malaysian federal government in 1969. This led to a loss of maritime trade, causing massive unemployment and brain drain. To revive the economy, Chief Minister Lim Chong Eu established the Bayan Lepas Free Industrial Zone in 1972. Massive industrialisation proved instrumental in reversing Penang's economic slump and led to the state's rapid economic growth until the late 1990s. Under Lim's tenure, the Penang Bridge, the first road link between Penang Island and the Malay Peninsula, was built.

Persistent brain drain, aggravated by federal policies prioritising the growth of Kuala Lumpur, resulted in Penang losing its leading position in the national economy by the 21st century. This decline, compounded by various issues including incoherent urban planning, poor traffic management and the dilapidation of George Town's heritage enclave following the repeal of the Rent Control Act in 2001, contributed to growing dissatisfaction within Penang's society. In response, civil societies in George Town mobilised public support to rejuvenate the city. Resentment against the Barisan Nasional (BN) administration led to the Pakatan Rakyat bloc (now Pakatan Harapan) rising to power through the 2008 state election. Efforts to preserve George Town's heritage architecture led to the city's historical core being designated as a UNESCO World Heritage Site that year.

In 2025, a sovereignty dispute emerged between the states of Penang and Kedah regarding the long-standing annual lease payment agreement for Penang. The payment, which had been fixed at 10,000 Spanish dollars since at least 1800, was increased to RM10 million by the federal government in 2018. Menteri Besar of Kedah Muhammad Sanusi Md Nor announced intentions to pursue legal action to revise the payment amount, arguing that the historical lease agreement governing Penang's status requires updated compensation to reflect modern economic conditions. Kedah asserted that the arrangement, dating back over 200 years to the initial acquisition of Penang Island and Seberang Perai by the British East India Company, is no longer equitable under contemporary circumstances. The Penang state government rejected these claims, reaffirming its status as a sovereign state within the Malaysian federation. Chief Minister Chow Kon Yeow stated that Penang's sovereignty is protected under the Constitution of Malaysia, which supersedes historical lease arrangements.

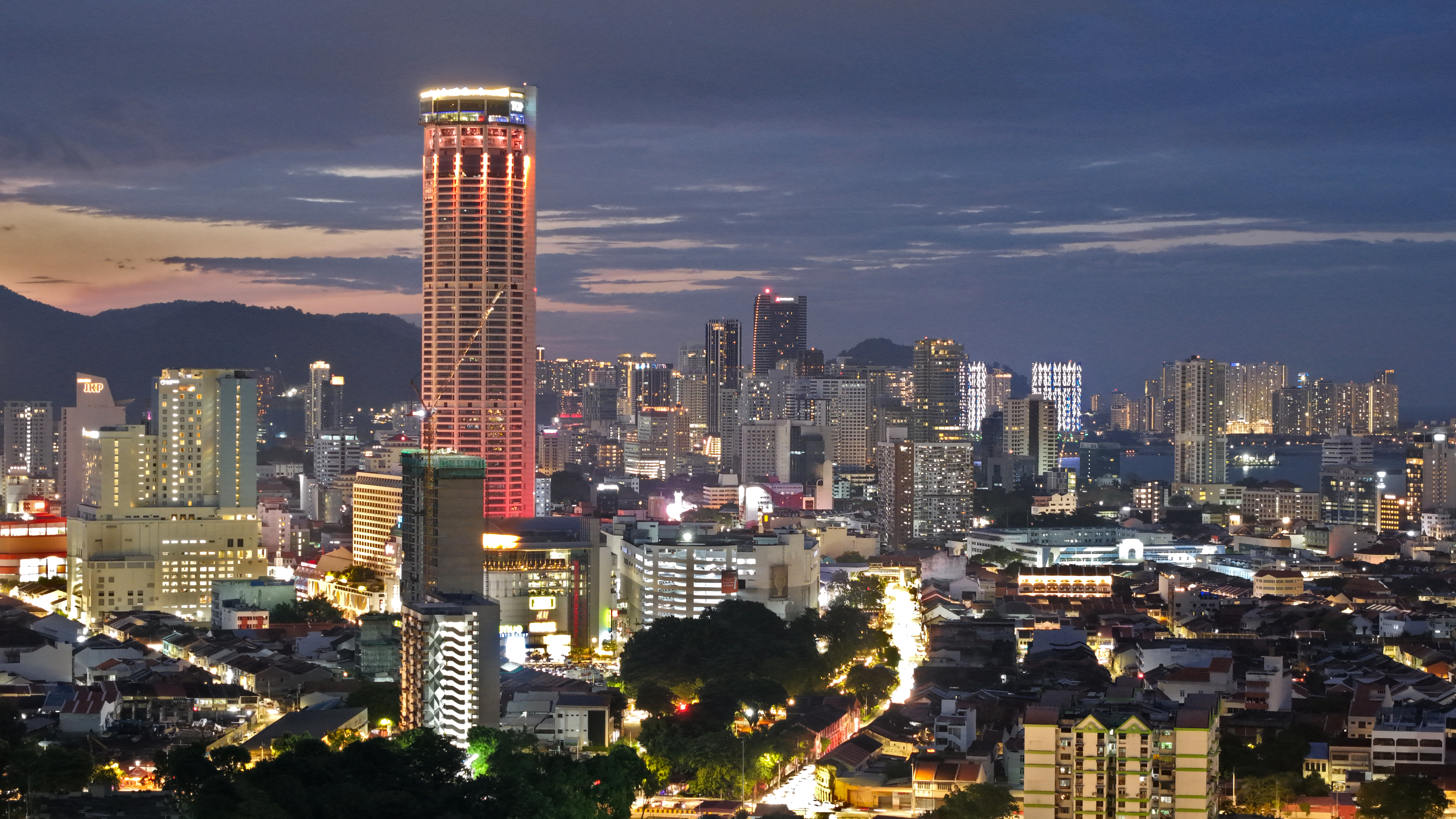
Skyline of George Town at night c. 2024

== Governance and politics ==
Current leaders

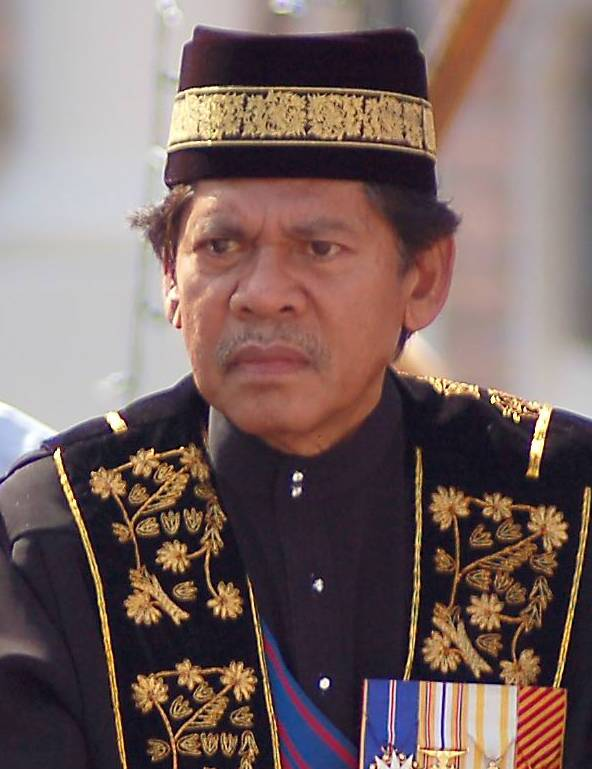
Ramli Ngah Talib
Governor

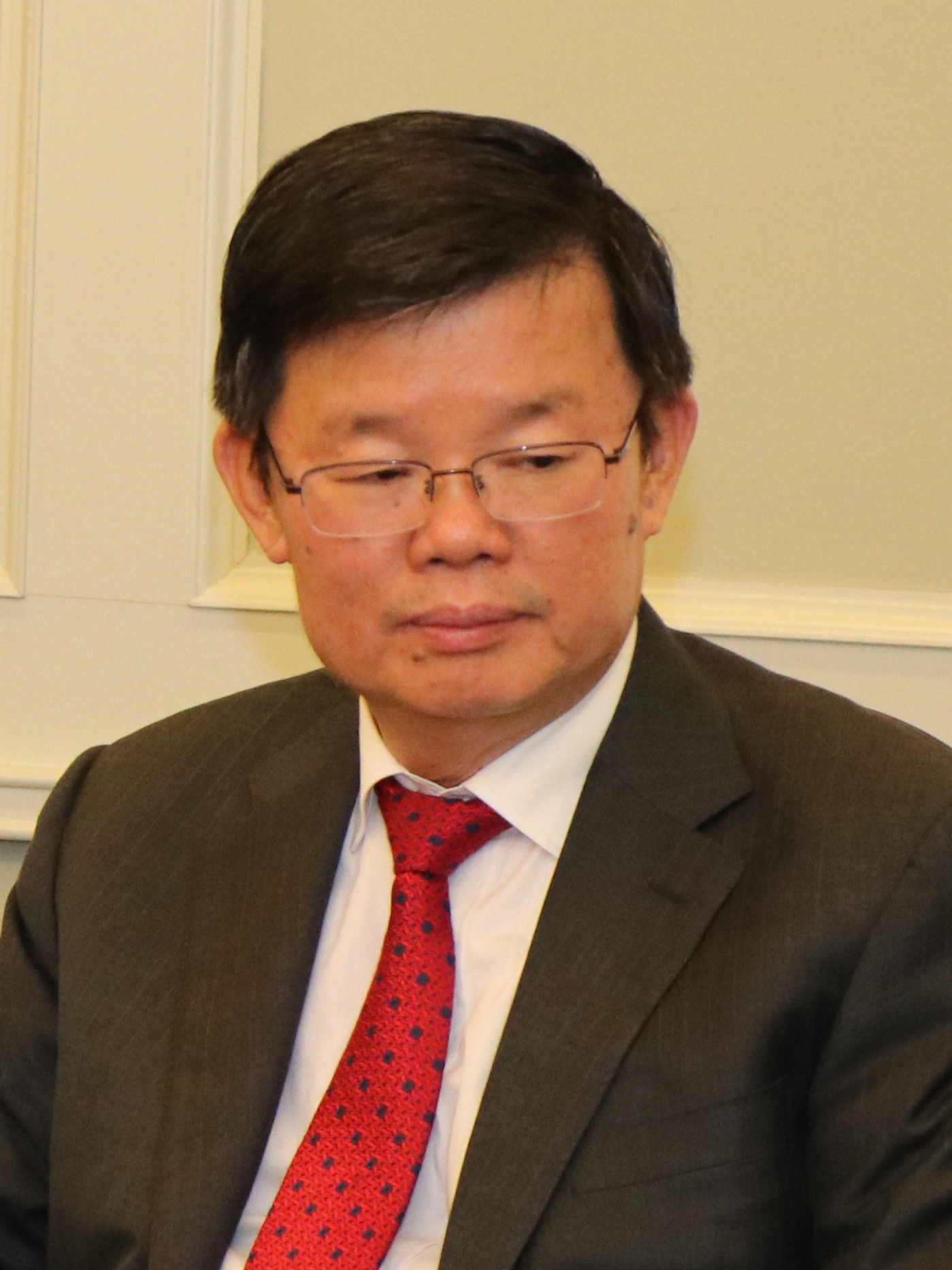
Chow Kon Yeow

Chief Minister

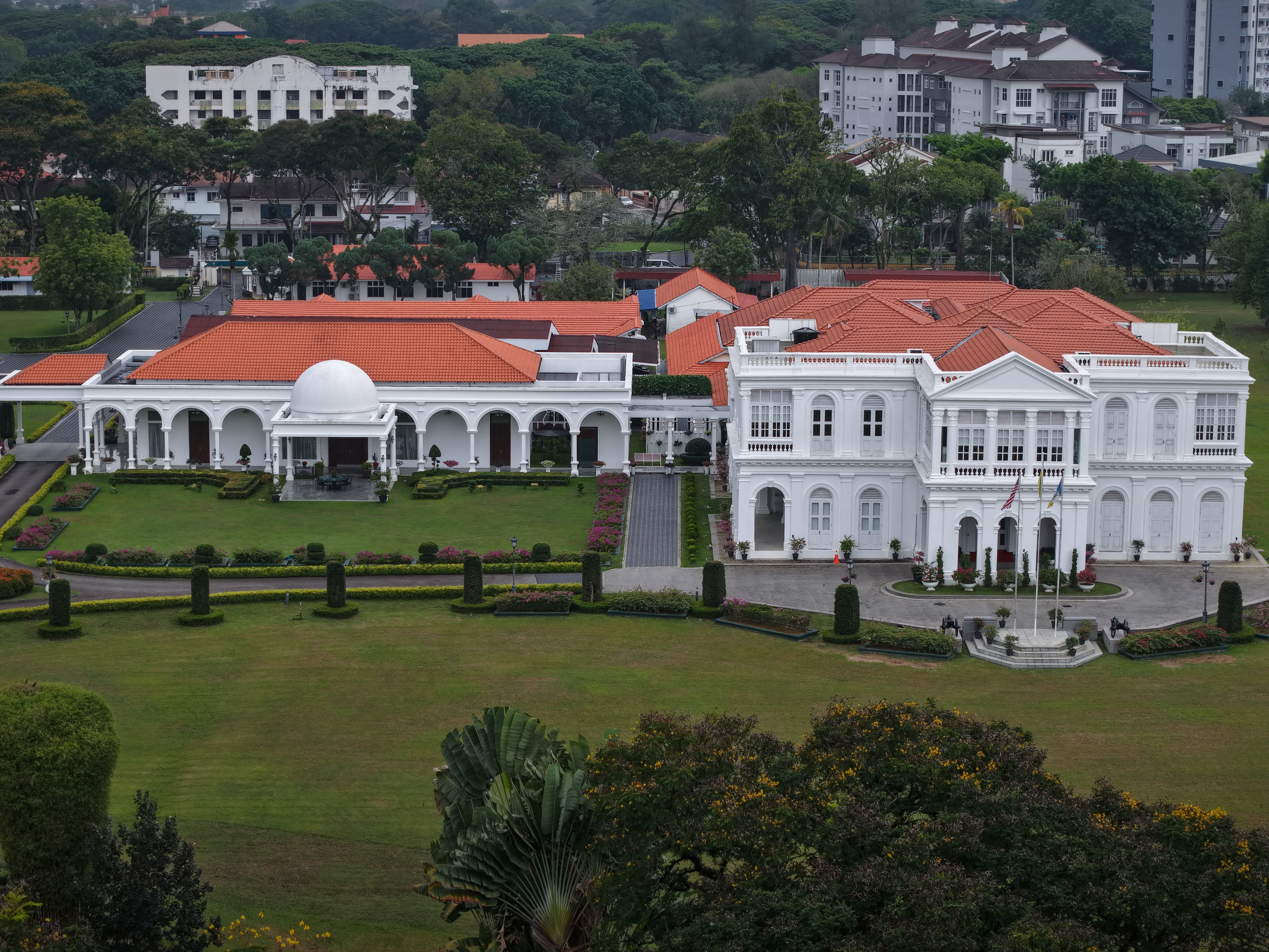
Seri Mutiara, the official residence of the Governor of Penang

Penang, a former British crown colony, is one of the four Malaysian states without hereditary monarchies. The Constitution of Penang, codified in 1957, is the state's highest law, consisting of 42 articles that govern the proceedings and powers of the state government. The head of state is the Governor (Malay: Yang di-Pertua Negeri), who is appointed by the King of Malaysia. Ramli Ngah Talib is the current Governor of Penang, having assumed office in 2025. In practice, the Governor's role is largely symbolic and ceremonial. This includes the authority to appoint the head of government and approve legislation that has been passed by the state's legislature.

The Penang state government has its own executive body and legislature, but their powers are limited compared to the Malaysian federal government. According to the Federal Constitution, the state can legislate on matters pertaining to Malay customs, land, agriculture and forestry, local government, civil and water works, and state administration. Matters falling under the joint purview of state and federal authorities include social welfare, wildlife protection and national parks, scholarships, husbandry, town planning, drainage and irrigation, and public health regulations.

The 40-member Penang State Legislative Assembly forms the state's legislature and is elected for a maximum term of five years from single-member constituencies through state elections. Compared to the rest of Peninsular Malaysia, Penang's electoral landscape is perceived as being more liberal and distinct due to the state's ethnic diversity and socio-economic development. Unlike other Peninsular states, ethnic Chinese have formed the plurality in Penang for decades, and the state's economic infrastructure is based primarily on commerce and trade rather than agriculture. As of 2023, non-Malays formed the majority in 25 of the 40 state constituencies. Thus, non-Malay electoral support is crucial to any political coalition aiming for power in Penang.

=== Executive ===
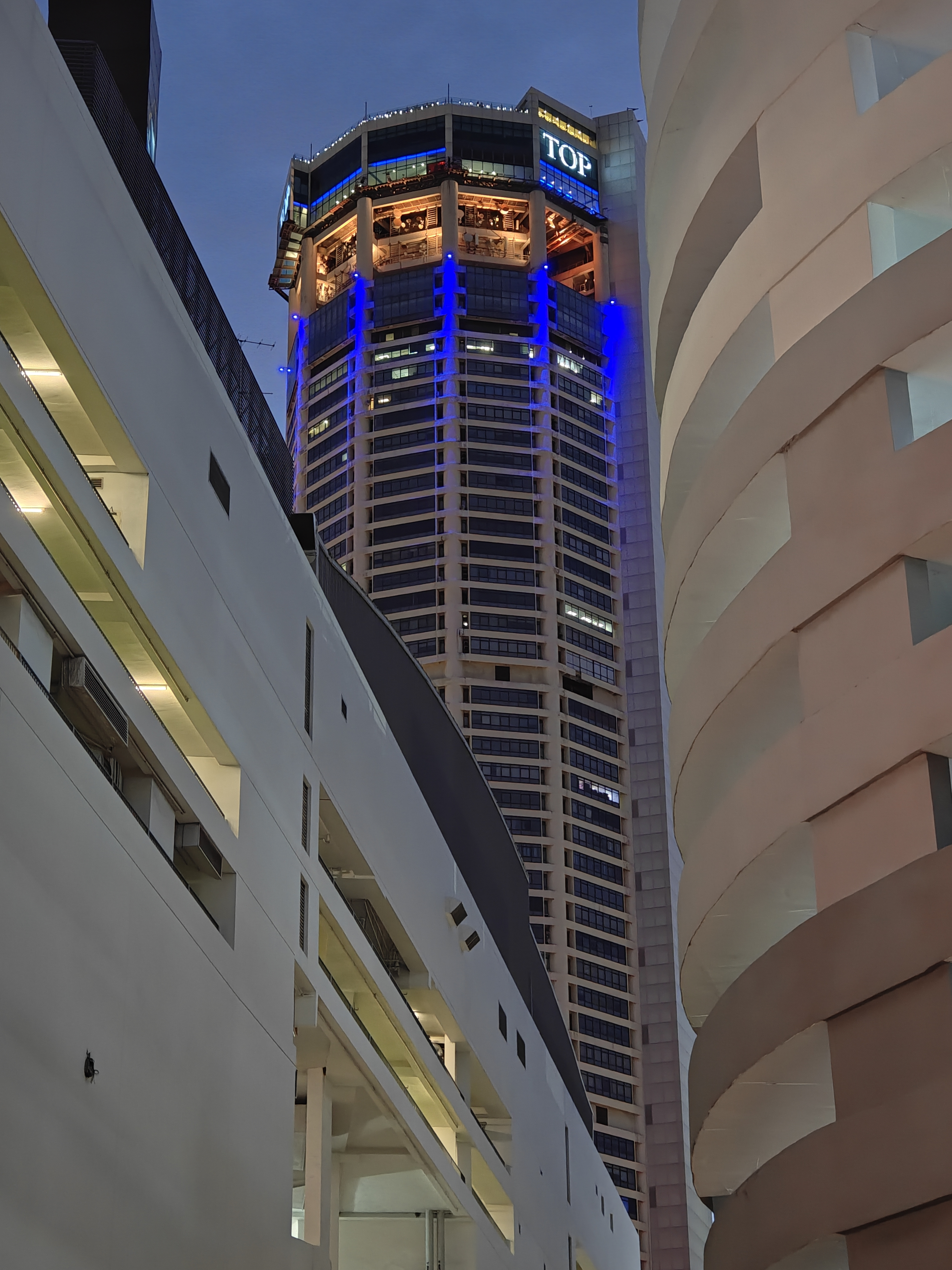
The 68-storey Komtar Tower in George Town also houses the Office of the Chief Minister of Penang.

The Penang State Executive Council is the executive authority of the Penang state government, similar in function to the federal Cabinet. It is led by the Chief Minister, who serves as the head of government in Penang. To this day, Penang remains the only Malaysian state where the position of the head of government has been continuously held by an ethnic Chinese since the nation's independence. Additionally, Penang was the first state to impose a two-term limit for the head of government's tenure. The current Chief Minister of Penang is Chow Kon Yeow of the Democratic Action Party (DAP), having assumed office after the 2018 state election.

=== Legislature ===
The unicameral 40-seat Penang State Legislative Assembly, whose members are called State Assemblymen, convenes at the neoclassical State Assembly Building in George Town. Penang practises the Westminster system whereby the State Executive Council members are appointed from the elected State Assemblymen. Any amendment to Penang's Constitution requires the support of at least two-thirds of the State Legislative Assembly. Prior to a state election, it is customary to dissolve the legislature, which necessitates the consent of the Governor.

The 2023 state election witnessed an unprecedented alliance between Pakatan Harapan (PH) and its erstwhile adversaries Barisan Nasional (BN). The PH–BN alliance currently commands a supermajority in the State Legislative Assembly, controlling 29 out of the 40 seats. However, the election also saw the right-wing Perikatan Nasional (PN) opposition bloc gaining ground in the rural Malay-majority constituencies, occupying the remaining 11 seats in the legislature.

Affiliation	Coalition/Party Leader	Status	Seats	
Affiliation	Coalition/Party Leader	Status	2023 election	Current
Pakatan Harapan; Barisan Nasional	Chow Kon Yeow	Government	29	29
Perikatan Nasional	Muhammad Fauzi Yusoff	Opposition	11	11
Total			40	40
Government majority			18	18

=== Local governments ===
Penang is further divided into two city-level municipalities, each administered by a local government. The local governments exercise power in areas such as planning and development control, public housing, public spaces, waste disposal, business licensing, markets, local transport, and municipal roads.

- The Penang Island City Council (MBPP) administers the city of George Town, which includes the entirety of Penang Island. It is made up of a mayor, a city secretary and 24 councillors.
- The Seberang Perai City Council (MBSP) is in charge of Seberang Perai. Similar in structure to the MBPP, it also consists of a mayor, a city secretary and 24 councillors.

Penang is also divided into five administrative districts – two in George Town and three in Seberang Perai. Each district is headed by a district officer. The lands and district office in each district deals with land taxation, thus differing from local governments that manage urban administration and maintenance of infrastructure.

After Pakatan Rakyat was voted into power in 2008, the newly-elected state government attempted to reinstate local government elections within Penang, which have been suspended since the 1960s. At the time, the Barisan Nasional-controlled federal government objected to the move, which eventually led to the Federal Court's decision that local government elections do not fall under the jurisdiction of state governments.

=== Judiciary ===
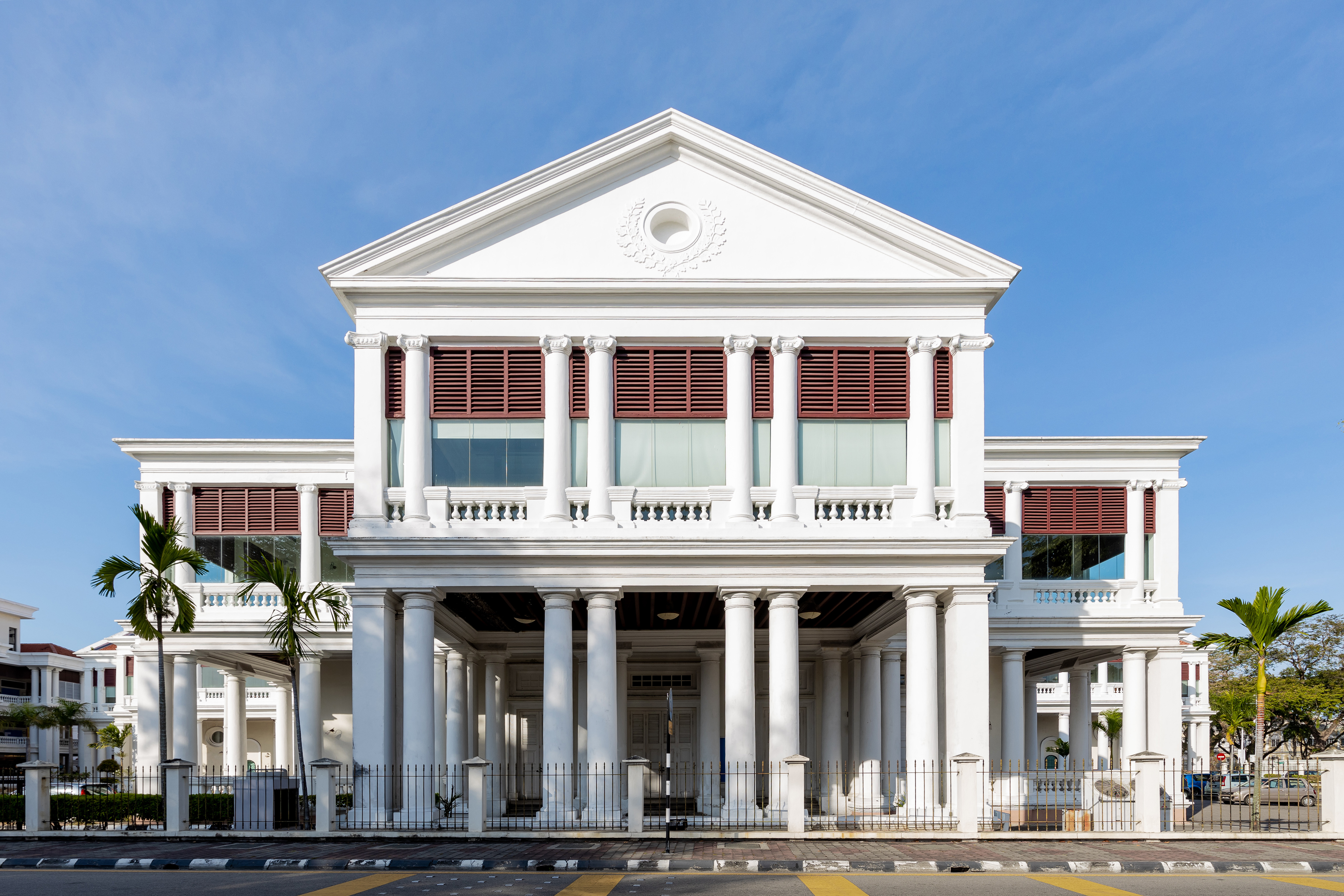
The Penang High Court building in George Town was built in 1903.

The present-day Malaysian judicial system traces its roots to 19th-century George Town. In 1807, Penang was granted a Royal Charter which paved the way for the establishment of a Supreme Court. In the following year, the Supreme Court of Penang (now Penang High Court) was inaugurated at Fort Cornwallis with the appointment of Edmond Stanley as the first Recorder.

The Penang High Court serves as the highest court in the state. Notable lawyers who served the high court include Tunku Abdul Rahman, Cecil Rajendra and Karpal Singh. Another high court is located in Butterworth, Seberang Perai and there are also four other Magistrate and Session Court complexes throughout Penang.

=== Foreign relations ===
Penang is home to the largest contingent of foreign diplomatic missions among Malaysian states. As of 2023, a total of 27 countries have either established consulates or appointed honorary consuls within Penang. The Penang state government has also inked a sister state agreement with Japan's Kanagawa Prefecture and a friendship state partnership with China's Hainan Province.

==== Consulates ====
This list is based on information from the Ministry of Foreign Affairs, unless otherwise cited.

- Australia
- Austria
- Bangladesh
- Belgium
- Brazil
- Canada
- Chile
- China
- Denmark
- Fiji
- Finland
- France
- Germany
- Hungary
- Indonesia
- Japan
- Nepal
- Pakistan
- Poland
- Russia
- South Africa
- Sweden
- Thailand
- Tunisia
- United Kingdom
- Ukraine

=== Security ===
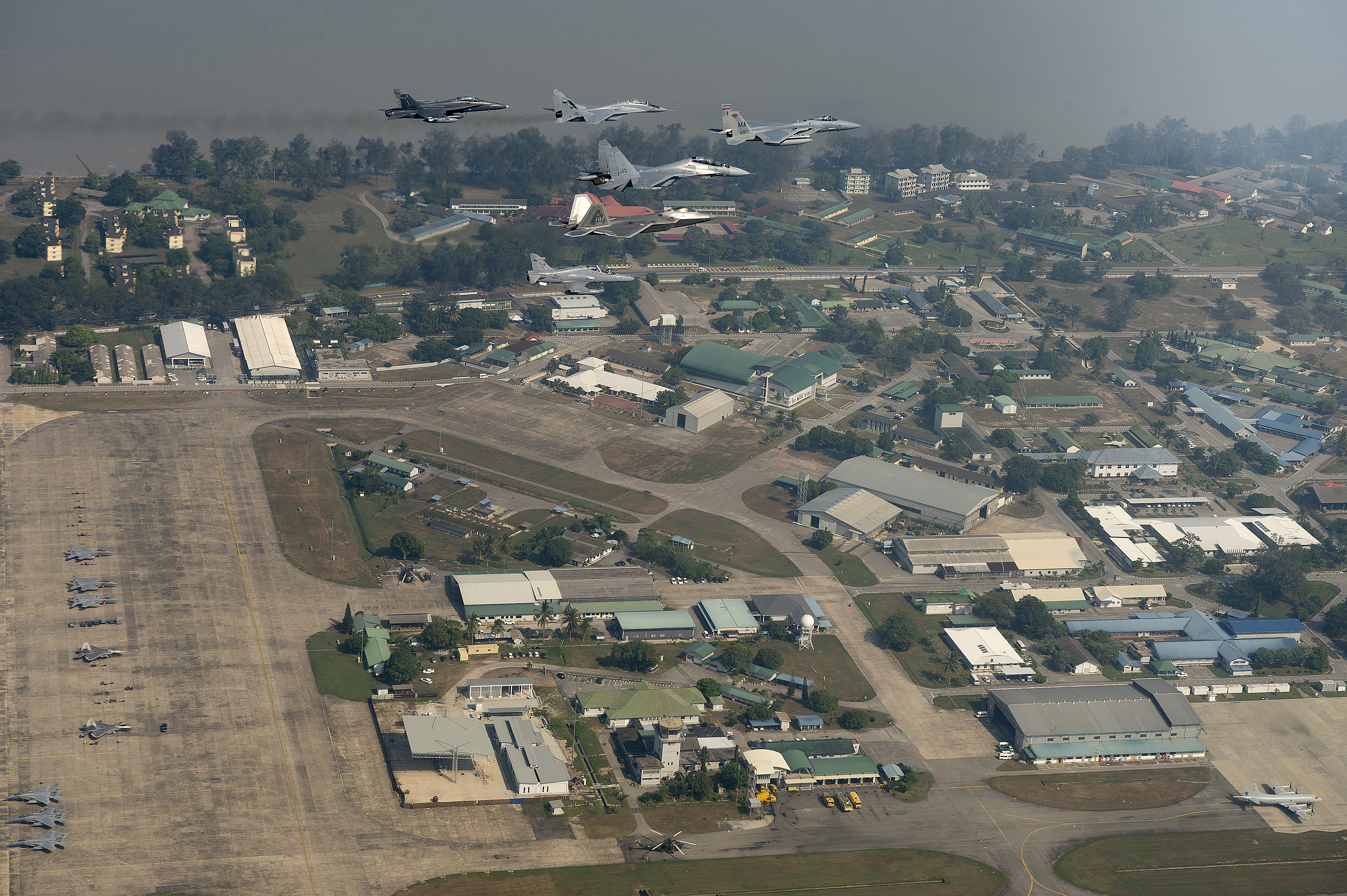
Fighter jets from the Royal Malaysian Air Force (RMAF) and the United States Air Force (USAF) over RMAF Butterworth Air Base

In 1861, the Penang and Province Wellesley Volunteer Corps (P&PWVC) was established as the second volunteer military force in Malaya after the Singapore Volunteer Corps. Initially, the unit was exclusively formed by Europeans, with other races being barred until 1899. Over time, the P&PWVC transformed into the 3rd Battalion of the Straits Settlements Volunteer Force (SSVF) and by 1937, the unit also contained a European machine gun platoon, a Malay rifle company, a medical section and headquarters reserve. Although enlistment increased prior to the Japanese invasion of Malaya, 3rd Battalion SSVF was eventually evacuated from Penang without engaging in any combat.

Since independence, the Malaysian federal government assumes sole responsibility for the country's defence. Penang houses the Malaysian Army's 2nd Battalion of the Royal Malay Regiment and Rejimen 509 Askar Wataniah, which traces its lineage back to the P&PWVC. The Royal Malaysian Navy maintains a volunteer reserve base in George Town. RMAF Butterworth Air Base also serves as the headquarters of the Five Power Defence Arrangements Integrated Area Defence System (HQIADS). The air base continues to host Australian air force and army units on a rotational basis, including Rifle Company Butterworth.

== Geography ==
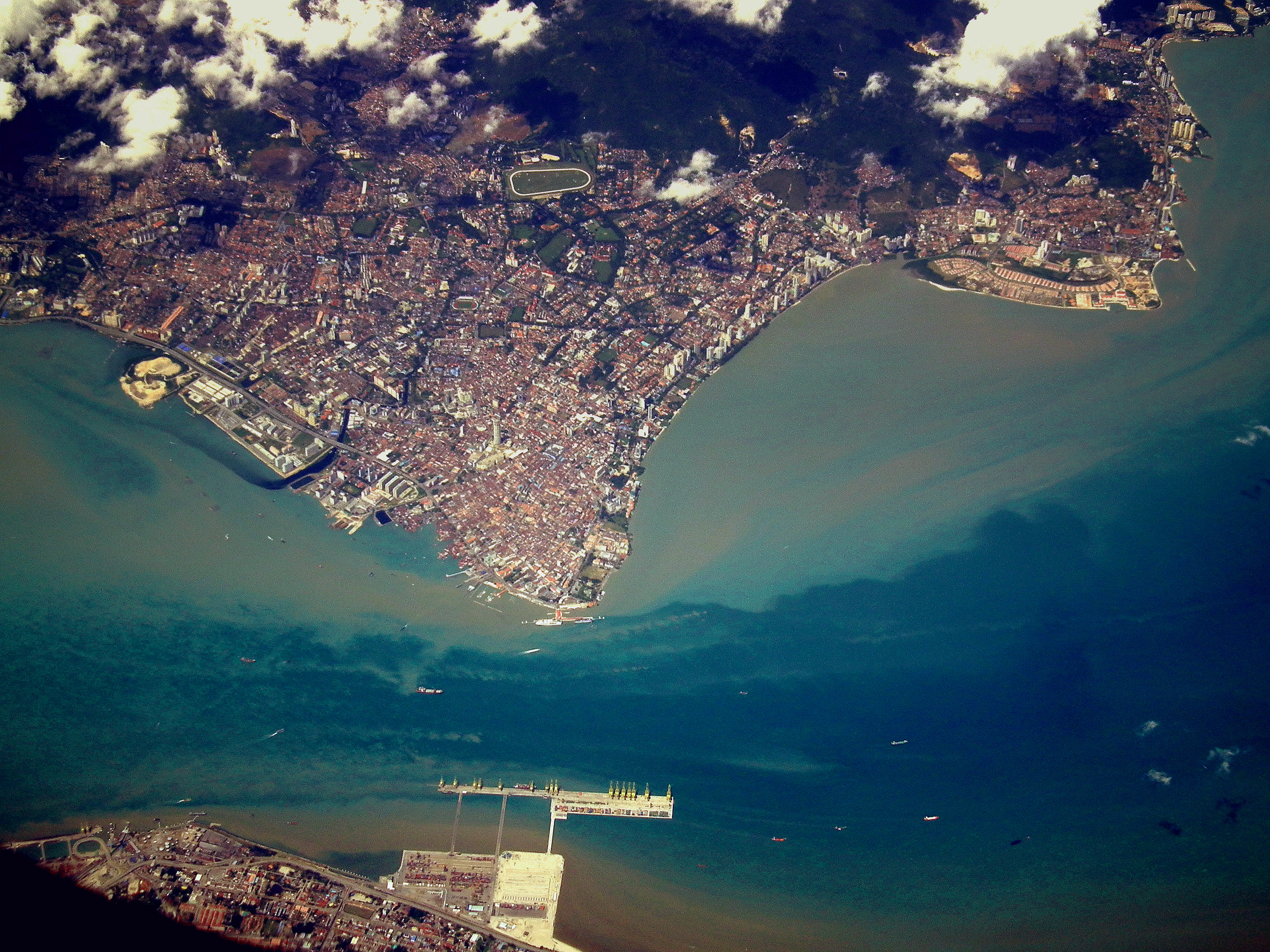
George Town is physically separated from Butterworth (bottom) by the Penang Strait.

With a land area of only 1,049 km^{2} (405 sq mi), Penang is the second smallest state in Malaysia after Perlis. It is located on the northwestern coastline of Peninsular Malaysia, lying between latitudes 5.59° and 5.12°N, and longitudes 100.17° and 100.56°E. The state is divided into two major halves by the Penang Strait, which is only 3 km (1.9 mi) wide at the narrowest point and 13 km (8.1 mi) at its widest.

- Penang Island, a 295 km^{2} (114 sq mi) island.
- Seberang Perai, a 748 km^{2} (289 sq mi) hinterland on the Malay Peninsula. It shares land borders with Kedah to the north and east, and Perak to the south.

The state capital, George Town, encompasses the entirety of Penang Island and a few surrounding islets, including Jerejak, Betong, Kendi, Rimau and Andaman islands. On the other hand, the city of Seberang Perai covers the mainland side of Penang.

Map of subdistricts within George Town and Seberang Perai.
Click link at the top right corner to zoom in.
1 Downtown George Town
2 Ayer Itam
3 Balik Pulau
4 Batu Ferringhi
5 Bayan Lepas
6 Gelugor
7 Gertak Sanggul
8 Jelutong
9 Pantai Acheh
10 Paya Terubong
11 Penang Hill
12 Relau
13 Tanjong Bungah
14 Tanjong Pinang
15 Tanjong Tokong
16 Teluk Bahang
17 Teluk Kumbar
18 Silicon Island
19 Butterworth
20 Batu Kawan
21 Bukit Mertajam
22 Bukit Minyak
23 Bukit Tambun
24 Bukit Tengah
25 Juru
26 Kepala Batas
27 Mak Mandin
28 Nibong Tebal
29 Perai
30 Permatang Pauh
31 Seberang Jaya
32 Sungai Bakap
33 Sungai Jawi
34 Tasek Gelugor
35 Teluk Air Tawar

=== Topography ===
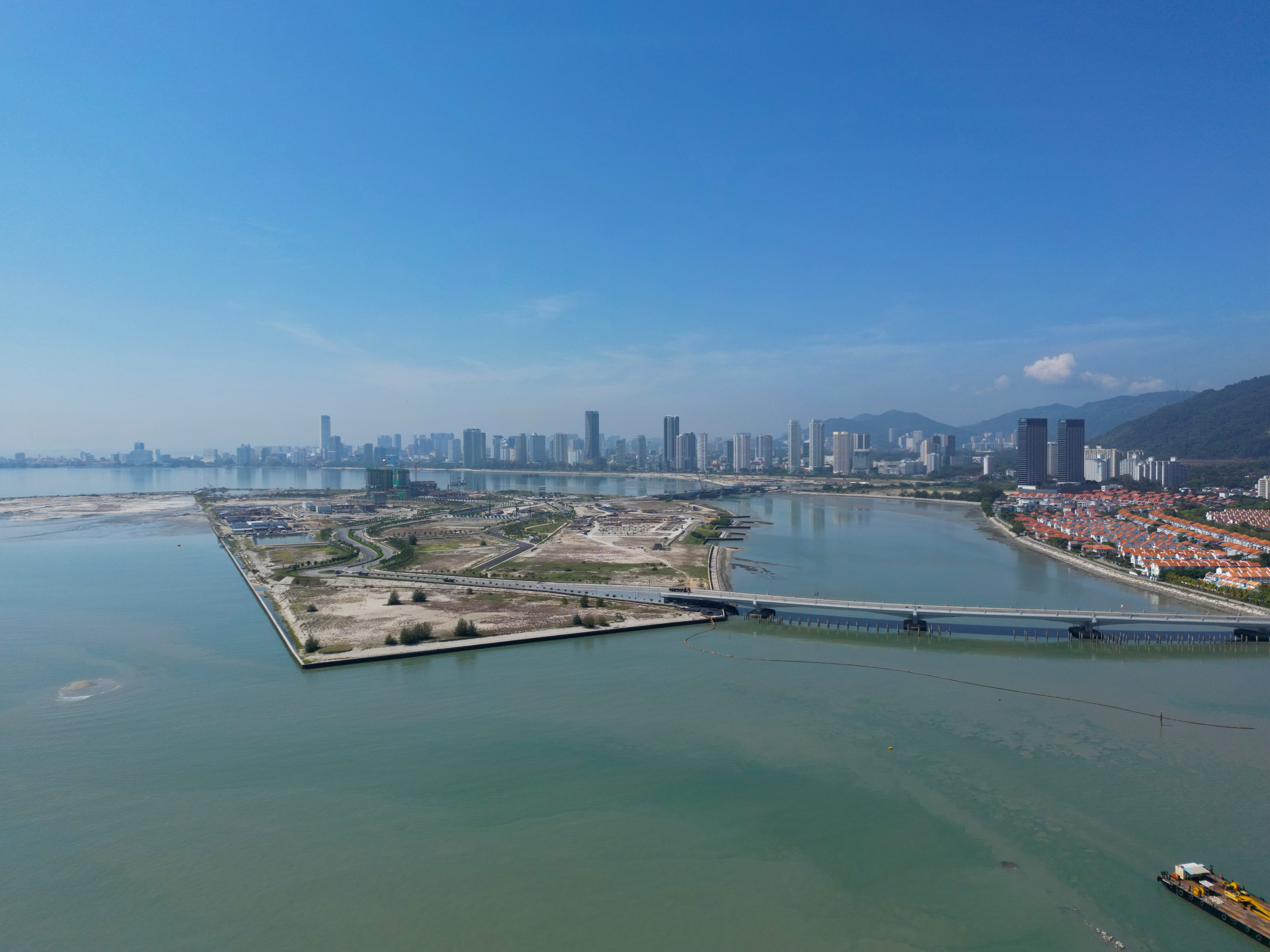
The ongoing Andaman Island reclamation project in George Town c. 2024. Reclamation allows the creation of valuable land for urban development, particularly in land-scarce Penang.

Penang Island is irregularly shaped, with a hilly and mostly forested interior. The island's coastal plains are narrow, with the most extensive plain located at the northeastern cape. George Town, which started off as a small settlement at the northeastern tip of the island, has expanded over the centuries to encompass the entire island, although the marshy western coast remains relatively underdeveloped. The highest point of the state is Penang Hill, which stands at a height of 833 m (2,733 ft) at the centre of the island. On the other hand, Seberang Perai has mostly flat topography, save for a hilly region along the eastern border with Kedah.

Due to land scarcity in George Town, land reclamation projects have been undertaken at high-demand areas, particularly along the island's east coast. In 2023, a massive reclamation project commenced off the city's southern coast to build the 920 ha (2,300-acre) Silicon Island, envisioned as a new hub for high-tech manufacturing and commerce. Following years of reclamation works, the Gurney Drive shoreline is also being transformed into Gurney Bay, intended as "a new iconic waterfront destination for Penang".

The major rivers within Penang include the Pinang, Perai, Muda and Kerian rivers. The Muda River serves as the northern border between Seberang Perai and Kedah, while the Kerian River forms part of the southern boundary between Seberang Perai, Kedah and Perak.

=== Climate ===
Penang has a tropical rainforest climate under the Köppen climate classification (Af). The state experiences relatively consistent temperatures throughout the course of the year, with an average high of about 32 °C and an average low of 24 °C (75 °F). Penang's proximity to Sumatra makes it susceptible to dust particles carried by wind from transient forest fires that create the perennial Southeast Asian haze. The Penang Meteorological Office at Bayan Lepas is the primary weather forecast facility for northwestern Malaysia.

Climate data for Penang (Bayan Lepas) (1961–1990 normals)
Month	Jan	Feb	Mar	Apr	May	Jun	Jul	Aug	Sep	Oct	Nov	Dec	Year
Mean daily maximum °C (°F)	31.6 (88.9)	32.2 (90.0)	32.2 (90.0)	31.9 (89.4)	31.6 (88.9)	31.4 (88.5)	31.0 (87.8)	30.9 (87.6)	30.4 (86.7)	30.4 (86.7)	30.7 (87.3)	31.1 (88.0)	31.3 (88.2)
Daily mean °C (°F)	26.9 (80.4)	27.4 (81.3)	27.6 (81.7)	27.7 (81.9)	27.6 (81.7)	27.3 (81.1)	26.9 (80.4)	26.8 (80.2)	26.5 (79.7)	26.4 (79.5)	26.5 (79.7)	26.7 (80.1)	27.0 (80.6)
Mean daily minimum °C (°F)	23.2 (73.8)	23.5 (74.3)	23.7 (74.7)	24.1 (75.4)	24.2 (75.6)	23.8 (74.8)	23.4 (74.1)	23.4 (74.1)	23.2 (73.8)	23.3 (73.9)	23.3 (73.9)	23.4 (74.1)	23.5 (74.4)
Average rainfall mm (inches)	68.7 (2.70)	71.7 (2.82)	146.4 (5.76)	220.5 (8.68)	203.4 (8.01)	178.0 (7.01)	192.1 (7.56)	242.4 (9.54)	356.1 (14.02)	383.0 (15.08)	231.8 (9.13)	113.5 (4.47)	2,407.6 (94.79)
Average rainy days (≥ 1.0 mm)	5	6	9	14	14	11	12	14	18	19	15	9	146
Mean monthly sunshine hours	248.8	233.2	235.3	224.5	203.6	202.4	205.5	188.8	161.0	170.2	182.1	209.0	2,464.4
Source: NOAA

Climate data for George Town (Penang International Airport) (1991–2020 normals, extremes 1934–present)
Month	Jan	Feb	Mar	Apr	May	Jun	Jul	Aug	Sep	Oct	Nov	Dec	Year
Record high °C (°F)	35.2 (95.4)	35.8 (96.4)	36.2 (97.2)	36.0 (96.8)	36.0 (96.8)	34.7 (94.5)	34.8 (94.6)	34.3 (93.7)	34.1 (93.4)	34.5 (94.1)	34.0 (93.2)	34.1 (93.4)	36.2 (97.2)
Mean daily maximum °C (°F)	31.9 (89.4)	32.4 (90.3)	32.6 (90.7)	32.3 (90.1)	32.1 (89.8)	32.0 (89.6)	31.6 (88.9)	31.4 (88.5)	31.1 (88.0)	31.0 (87.8)	31.1 (88.0)	31.3 (88.3)	31.7 (89.1)
Daily mean °C (°F)	27.8 (82.0)	28.1 (82.6)	28.4 (83.1)	28.4 (83.1)	28.4 (83.1)	28.3 (82.9)	27.9 (82.2)	27.7 (81.9)	27.4 (81.3)	27.2 (81.0)	27.2 (81.0)	27.4 (81.3)	27.8 (82.0)
Mean daily minimum °C (°F)	24.6 (76.3)	24.7 (76.5)	25.0 (77.0)	25.2 (77.4)	25.3 (77.5)	25.2 (77.4)	24.9 (76.8)	24.7 (76.5)	24.4 (75.9)	24.3 (75.7)	24.4 (75.9)	24.5 (76.1)	24.8 (76.6)
Record low °C (°F)	19.0 (66.2)	18.0 (64.4)	20.5 (68.9)	22.0 (71.6)	20.5 (68.9)	20.0 (68.0)	20.0 (68.0)	21.0 (69.8)	20.0 (68.0)	20.5 (68.9)	19.5 (67.1)	19.5 (67.1)	18.0 (64.4)
Average precipitation mm (inches)	80.3 (3.16)	85.8 (3.38)	145.5 (5.73)	188.4 (7.42)	229.1 (9.02)	163.5 (6.44)	189.8 (7.47)	246.3 (9.70)	316.4 (12.46)	336.6 (13.25)	232.8 (9.17)	116.5 (4.59)	2,331 (91.77)
Average precipitation days (≥ 1.0 mm)	6.8	6.0	9.8	13.6	13.0	9.9	10.0	13.2	15.5	18.3	15.7	10.8	142.6
Average relative humidity (%)	75	78	81	84	85	84	84	85	86	87	85	78	83
Mean monthly sunshine hours	191	204	201	191	178	171	172	169	167	161	164	169	2,138
Source 1: World Meteorological Organization
Source 2: OgimetDeutscher Wetterdienst (humidity),

Climate data for Penang (RMAF Butterworth Air Base) (2007–2020 normals, extremes 2015–2022)
Month	Jan	Feb	Mar	Apr	May	Jun	Jul	Aug	Sep	Oct	Nov	Dec	Year
Record high °C (°F)	35.9 (96.6)	37.0 (98.6)	36.6 (97.9)	35.0 (95.0)	34.0 (93.2)	34.8 (94.6)	34.4 (93.9)	34.0 (93.2)	34.0 (93.2)	34.3 (93.7)	33.9 (93.0)	36.4 (97.5)	37.0 (98.6)
Mean daily maximum °C (°F)	31.6 (88.9)	32.1 (89.8)	32.2 (90.0)	31.9 (89.4)	31.8 (89.2)	31.8 (89.2)	31.5 (88.7)	31.9 (89.4)	31.3 (88.3)	31.1 (88.0)	30.9 (87.6)	31.5 (88.7)	31.6 (88.9)
Daily mean °C (°F)	27.8 (82.0)	28.1 (82.6)	28.4 (83.1)	28.6 (83.5)	28.7 (83.7)	28.6 (83.5)	28.2 (82.8)	28.1 (82.6)	27.7 (81.9)	27.7 (81.9)	27.7 (81.9)	27.7 (81.9)	28.1 (82.6)
Mean daily minimum °C (°F)	24.0 (75.2)	24.1 (75.4)	24.8 (76.6)	25.3 (77.5)	25.5 (77.9)	25.4 (77.7)	24.9 (76.8)	24.7 (76.5)	24.6 (76.3)	24.6 (76.3)	24.7 (76.5)	24.5 (76.1)	24.8 (76.6)
Record low °C (°F)	22.3 (72.1)	19.8 (67.6)	21.6 (70.9)	22.7 (72.9)	23.3 (73.9)	22.5 (72.5)	22.2 (72.0)	22.1 (71.8)	22.0 (71.6)	22.7 (72.9)	22.8 (73.0)	21.6 (70.9)	19.8 (67.6)
Average precipitation mm (inches)	96.3 (3.79)	83.6 (3.29)	100.7 (3.96)	183.7 (7.23)	261.0 (10.28)	148.9 (5.86)	185.9 (7.32)	126.3 (4.97)	293.4 (11.55)	291.9 (11.49)	266.3 (10.48)	112.9 (4.44)	2,150.9 (84.66)
Average precipitation days	7.6	6.0	7.1	13.4	14.9	10.0	11.1	12.6	16.0	17.3	13.9	10.3	140.2
Source 1: IEM
Source 2: Meteomanz (precipitation 2016–2022)

=== Nature ===
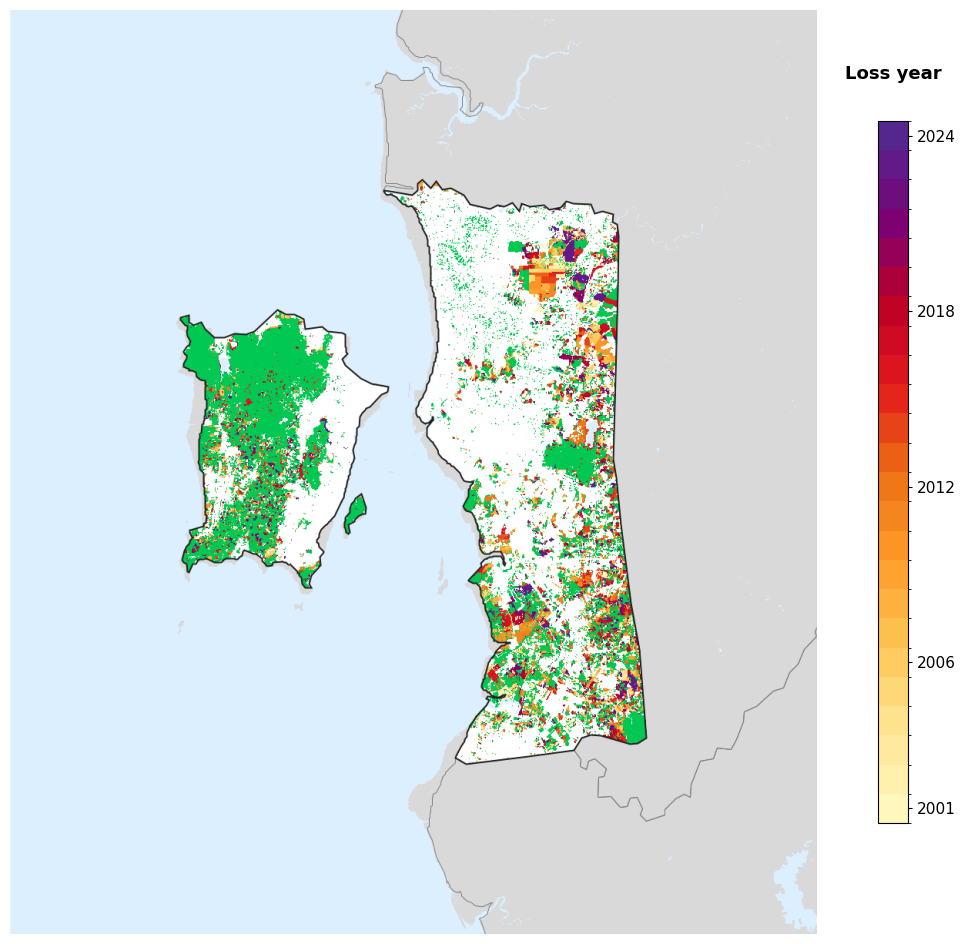
Tree-cover loss year in Penang, 2001-2024, from the Global Forest Change dataset

In spite of rapid urbanisation, Penang has managed to preserve a significant portion of its natural environment. Within the state, 7,761 ha (77.61 km^{2}) have been designated as protected forest reserves. In 2021, the 12,481 ha (124.81 km^{2}) Penang Hill Biosphere Reserve was designated a UNESCO Biosphere Reserve in recognition of the area's biodiversity. The gazetted nature reserve includes the Penang National Park, which covers 2,562 ha (25.62 km^{2}) of the northwestern tip of the island. It has been identified as one of the state's ecotourism destinations, alongside the Penang Botanic Gardens and the Tropical Spice Garden.

== Economy ==
Economy of Penang
Statistics
- GDP: US$28.016 billion (2023)
- GDP growth: 3.3% (2023)
- GDP per capita: US$15,814 (2023)
- Gini coefficient: 0.371 (2022)
- Human Development Index: 0.839 (2023)
- Labour force: 71.3% (participation rate in 2023)
- Unemployment: 2.2% (2023)

External
- FDI stock: US$13.4 billion (2023)

Public finance
- Government debt: US$9.93 million
- All values, unless otherwise stated, are in US dollars.

Economic sectors in Penang by GDP share (2023)
1. Services (48.0%)
2. Manufacturing (46.5%)
3. Construction (2.90%)
4. Agriculture (1.90%)
5. Mining (0.10%)

Despite its small size, Penang has one of the most robust economies in Malaysia. The state's tertiary-based economy is largely driven by the manufacturing and services sectors. In 2023, Penang's GDP was worth nearly RM128.593 billion (US$28.016 billion) with a growth rate of 3.3%. Penang's GDP per capita of RM72,586 (US$15,814) was the highest among Malaysian states, surpassing the World Bank's threshold of US$14,005 to be considered a high-income economy. In addition, the George Town Conurbation had a GDP worth US$30 billion in 2020, making it the second largest metropolitan economy in Malaysia after the Klang Valley.

Penang contributed approximately RM7 billion (US$1.69 billion) of Malaysia's yearly tax revenue and consistently records one of the lowest unemployment rates in the nation – at 2.2% as of 2023. Average monthly salaries rose to RM3,557 (US$859.18), the second highest among Malaysian states after Selangor, while labour force participation rate increased to 71.3% from 70.1% in the previous year.

Penang is the top destination in Malaysia for foreign investors, capturing US$13.4 billion – or nearly 33% – of the country's inbound foreign direct investments (FDI) in 2023. As of 2023, the bulk of Penang's FDI originated from the Netherlands, Cayman Islands and Singapore. The state has also attracted hundreds of multinational corporations (MNCs) to its shores and plays a growing role in the global electronics supply chain, holding a share of more than 5% in the world's semiconductor sales. Penang is concurrently Malaysia's largest exporter, accounting for nearly RM495 billion (US$119.57 billion) – or 32.8% – of the country's exports in 2024. The services sector has been growing in tandem as well, with Penang being the second most popular hub in Malaysia for Global Business Services (GBS) and the financial heart of the country's northwestern region, complemented by the state's traditional popularity as a destination for tourism, business events and health care.

Penang's economic renaissance, particularly since 2008, was described by Bloomberg as Malaysia's "biggest economic success", in spite of the federal government's focus on other states such as Johor and Sarawak. The Penang state government has also managed to pare down public debt to RM41.1 million (US$9.93 million) by 2022. In addition, Penang's Human Development Index (HDI) value increased to 0.839 as of 2023, the second highest of all Malaysian states excluding the federal territories.

The booming economy has also led to a considerable interest in real estate in Penang. In 2016, George Town was ranked Malaysia's most attractive destination for commercial property investment by Knight Frank, surpassing even Kuala Lumpur. In 2023, Penang's residential market was ranked the second most popular in Southeast Asia after Singapore.

=== Manufacturing ===
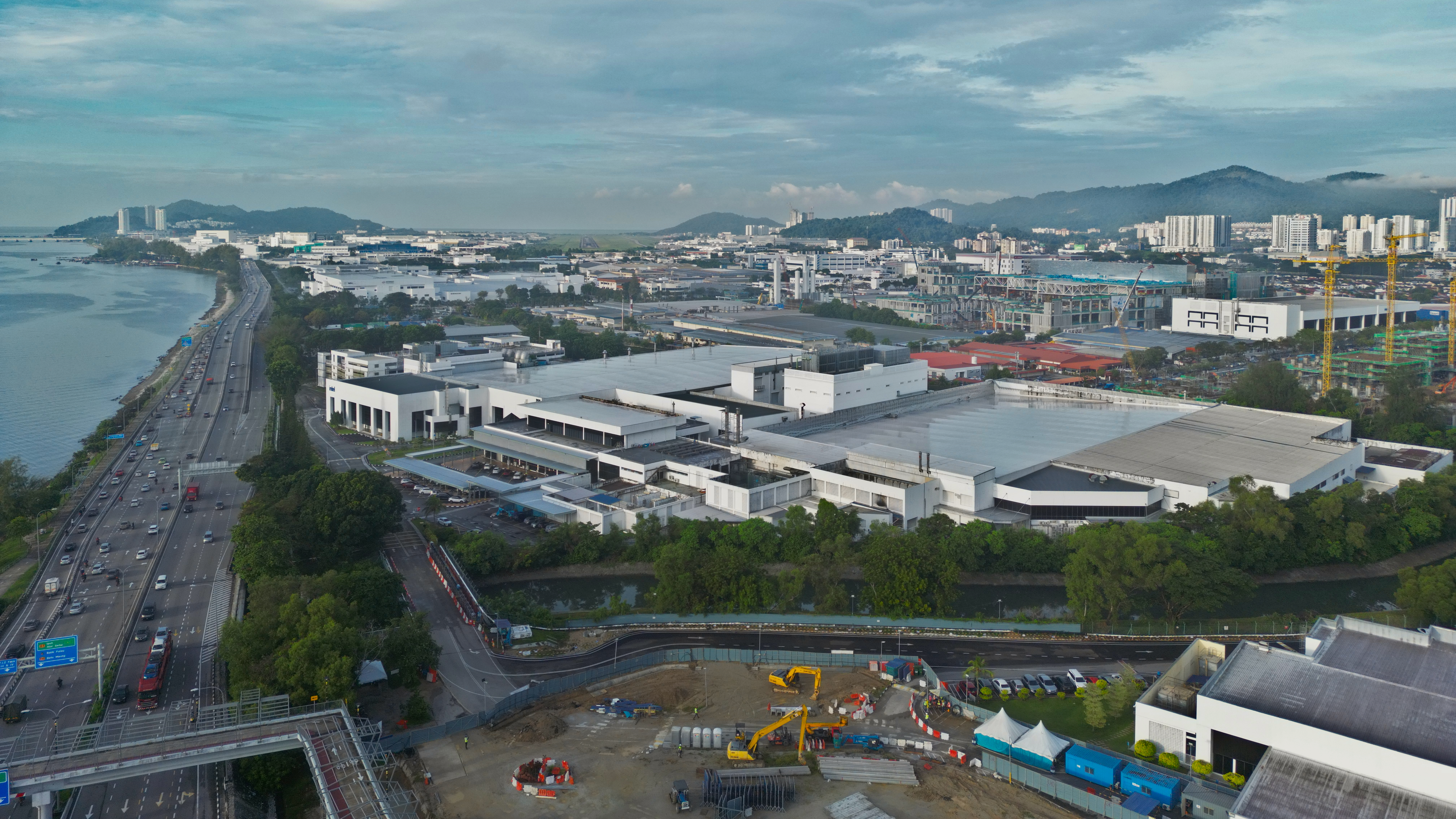
Bayan Lepas Free Industrial Zone, known as the Silicon Valley of the East, was the first designated free-trade zone in post-independence Malaysia and is now a major electronics manufacturing hub.

In the early years following Malaya's independence, Penang's industrialisation efforts were limited to import substitution. This was when George Town still enjoyed its free port status. The first industrial estates were built in the 1960s at Mak Mandin and Perai during the tenure of Penang's first Chief Minister Wong Pow Nee.

However, the revocation of George Town's free port status and the fall of Wong's administration in 1969 marked a turning point in Penang's economic fortunes. Wong's successor, Lim Chong Eu, initiated a massive transformation of Penang's economy. The Bayan Lepas Free Industrial Zone (Bayan Lepas FIZ) in George Town was established in 1972, followed by the Perai Free Industrial Zone (Perai FIZ) in 1980. The zones played a critical role in reviving Penang's economy and driving the state's economic growth in the late 20th century. The Penang state government has since embarked on building newer industrial parks within Seberang Perai where land is more readily available, such as at Seberang Jaya, Bukit Minyak and Batu Kawan.

Penang's manufacturing sector attracted US$13.1 billion of foreign direct investments (FDI) in 2023, accounting for almost 47% of Malaysia's total that year. Among the hundreds of MNCs with manufacturing operations in Penang are technology firms such as AMD, Bosch, Broadcom, Dell, HP Inc., Intel, Motorola, Osram and Renesas. According to Financial Times in 2024, Penang is well-positioned to benefit from the ongoing China–United States trade war, as restrictions push businesses to adopt the China Plus One strategy.

=== Services ===
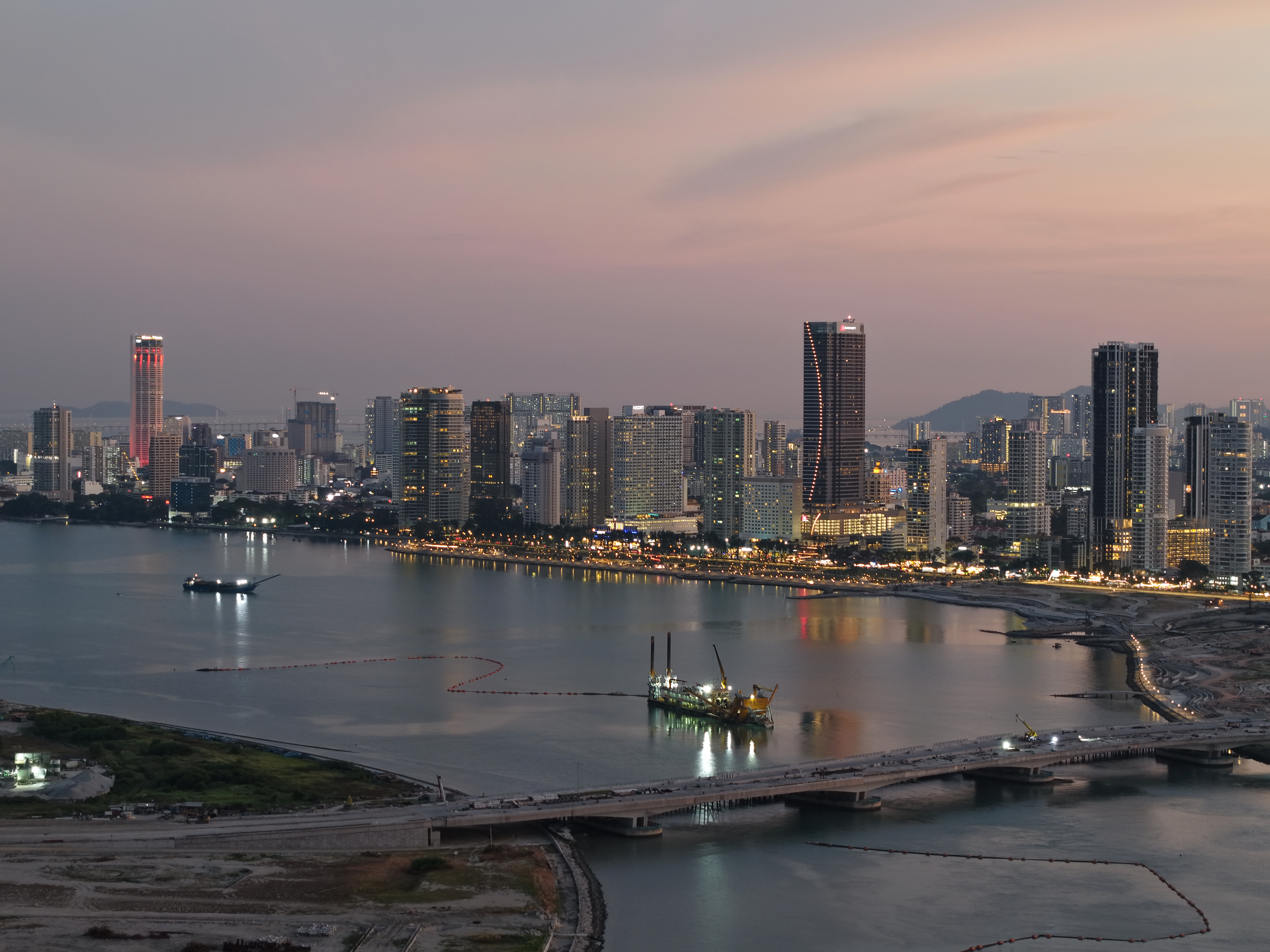
Skyscrapers along Gurney Drive, part of George Town's Central Business District (CBD)

The services sector contributed 48% of Penang's GDP as of 2023 and employed almost 3/5 of the state's workforce. George Town is the commercial hub of northern Malaysia. As of 2023, finance and ancillary services contributed 9% of Penang's GDP. The Penang International Airport (PIA) is the country's second busiest in terms of aircraft movements and in 2023, handled RM365 billion (US$93 billion) worth of exports, the highest of all entry points nationwide. In 2024, the Port of Penang processed over 1.4 million TEUs of cargo, the third highest among Malaysia's seaports.

Traditionally one of Malaysia's most popular tourist destinations, Penang has embarked on economic diversification by expanding its tourism offerings in areas such as health care, business events, ecotourism and cruise arrivals. Penang is the leading destination in Malaysia for medical tourism. The state's business events industry generated an economic impact of nearly RM1.3 billion (US$0.31 billion) in 2024. Penang's retail sector is characterised by a diverse range of establishments, including modern shopping malls and traditional shophouses that specialise in local delicacies and produce.

Penang is also a major hub for shared services and outsourcing (SSO). By 2016, the state attracted RM4.1 billion of investments for global business services (GBS), the second largest share in the country after Kuala Lumpur. The offshore expansion of multinational firms to Penang has led to the creation of thousands of jobs and an increased demand for new office spaces within the state. In addition, Penang is home to a thriving startup community, driven by home-grown companies like Piktochart and DeliverEat.

== Utilities ==
Water supply, which comes under the jurisdiction of the Penang state government, is wholly managed by the Penang Water Supply Corporation (PBAPP). The state enjoys the lowest domestic water tariff in Malaysia, at RM0.32 (US$0.08) per 1,000 litres, but also records the highest domestic water consumption per capita in Malaysia at 278 L (61 imp gal; 73 US gal) in 2018. Over 80% of Penang's water supply comes from the Muda River, which forms the northern border between Seberang Perai and Kedah. This leaves the state vulnerable to effluents from upstream Kedah, as well as constant political disputes between the neighbouring states over the river. To counter water supply disruptions, PBAPP has contingency plans in place to draw water from alternative sources such as the Ayer Itam, Teluk Bahang and Mengkuang dams. The state government has also been negotiating with neighbouring Perak to secure additional water supply.

In 1904, George Town became the first city within British Malaya to be supplied with electricity. At present, electricity for industrial and domestic consumption is provided by Tenaga Nasional (TNB). In 2024, TNB built a RM500 million (US$120.77 million) overhead power grid comprising 31 monopole transmission towers across the Penang Strait, boosting power transmission to George Town to 2,000 MW. Collaboration between TNB and the two city governments in Penang to replace existing street lighting with energy-efficient LED street lights is ongoing.

Municipal solid waste is disposed at the Pulau Burung landfill in Seberang Perai. The amount of solid waste generated in Penang has been steadily increasing over the years, from 838,365 metric tons in 2009 to 1,518,010 metric tons in 2019, with an average increase of 6.5%. However, Penang boasts the highest recycling rate in the country, standing at 47% as of 2019. To streamline the waste management process, the two city governments reintroduced a waste sorting policy in 2024.

In 2020, Penang had become the first Malaysian state to require the installation of fibre-optic communication infrastructure for all development projects. As of September 2023, 5G coverage had reached 73.4% of the populated areas in the state. In 2024, DE-CIX inaugurated the Penang Internet Exchange (PIX), with internet traffic being routed through a data centre at Bayan Baru. State government agencies have been promoting the digital economy and intensifying efforts to attract high-value technology players to further boost the state's economic growth.

== Transportation ==
=== Land ===
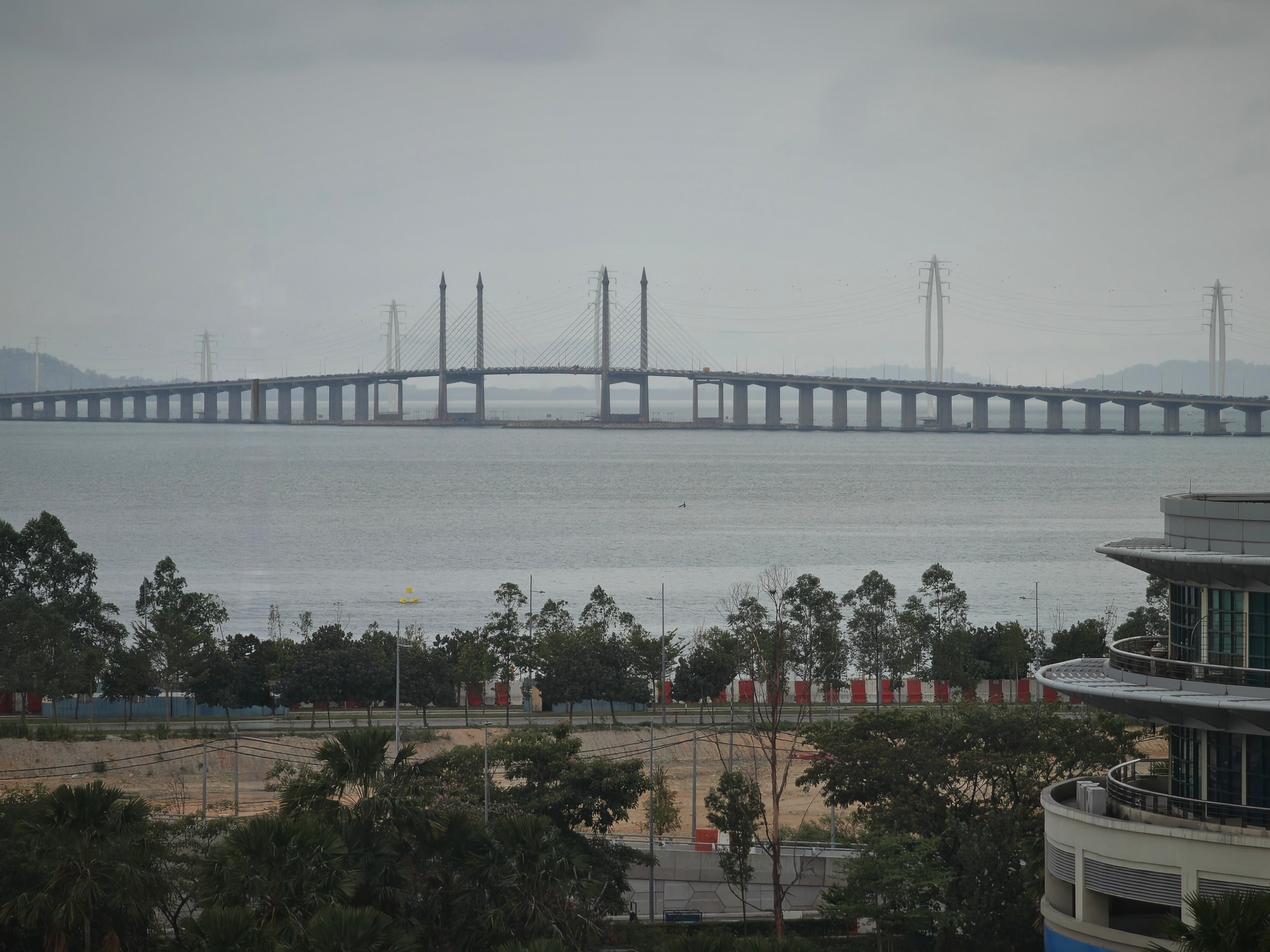
Middle span of the Penang Bridge, with monopole transmission towers in the background, c. 2025

Penang Island is physically connected to mainland Seberang Perai by two road bridges – the 13.5 km (8.4 mi) Penang Bridge and the 24 km (15 mi) Second Penang Bridge. Seberang Perai is accessible through the North–South Expressway, a 966 km-long (600 mi) expressway that stretches along the western part of Peninsular Malaysia. Other major toll routes in the state include the Butterworth Outer Ring Road (BORR) and the Butterworth–Kulim Expressway.

In addition, the Keretapi Tanah Melayu (KTM) West Coast Line runs through Seberang Perai, with the Butterworth railway station serving as the principal terminal in northwestern Malaysia. Aside from regular KTM services, Butterworth is also one of the main stops of the Eastern & Oriental Express between Bangkok and Singapore. Penang Sentral is the main transit hub within Penang, located in close proximity to the Sultan Abdul Halim Ferry Terminal and the Butterworth railway station.

Excluding toll routes, Penang's road system covered a distance of 6,725.1 km (4,178.8 mi) as of 2023. Within George Town, the Tun Dr Lim Chong Eu Expressway is a coastal highway that runs along the city's eastern seaboard, connecting the city centre with the Penang Bridge, the Bayan Lepas Free Industrial Zone and the Second Penang Bridge. The Federal Route 6 is a pan-island trunk road that circles the city, while the George Town Inner Ring Road serves as the main thoroughfare within the city centre.

==== Public transportation ====
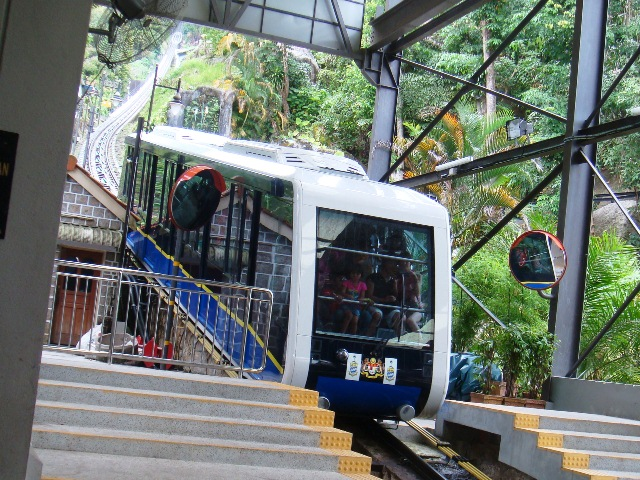
The Penang Hill Railway, Malaysia's only funicular railway system, ascends slopes that are said to be the steepest in the world at an angle of 27.9°.

Under British rule, George Town was a pioneer in public transportation within Malaya. The city's first tram system, originally powered by steam, began operations in the 1880s, but the trams became obsolete by 1936. The trishaw from the colonial era still plies the city's streets, catering primarily to tourists.

Public buses form the backbone of public transportation in Penang. Established in 2007, Rapid Penang is the state's main public transport operator, with 47 active routes throughout the George Town Conurbation including interstate routes into the neighbouring towns of Sungai Petani, Kulim and Kerian. Since 2024, Rapid Penang has introduced demand-responsive transport services within the state, utilising vans to address last mile connectivity.

The only rail-based transportation system within Penang is the century-old Penang Hill Railway, a funicular service to the peak of Penang Hill. A cable car system is being constructed as of 2025 to reduce overreliance on the railway. The Penang state government has also planned to introduce urban rail throughout the state as part of the Penang Transport Master Plan. In 2024, the Malaysian federal government assumed control of the Mutiara LRT Line from the state government. Spanning a distance of 29.5 km (18.3 mi), the line is the first domestic light rail system outside the Klang Valley, and will link the cities of George Town and Seberang Perai. Construction commenced in 2025 and is expected to be complete by 2031.

To promote urban mobility, pedestrian and cycling infrastructure throughout the state are also being upgraded. In 2016, George Town became the first city in Malaysia to operate a public bicycle-sharing service with the inauguration of LinkBike.

=== Air ===
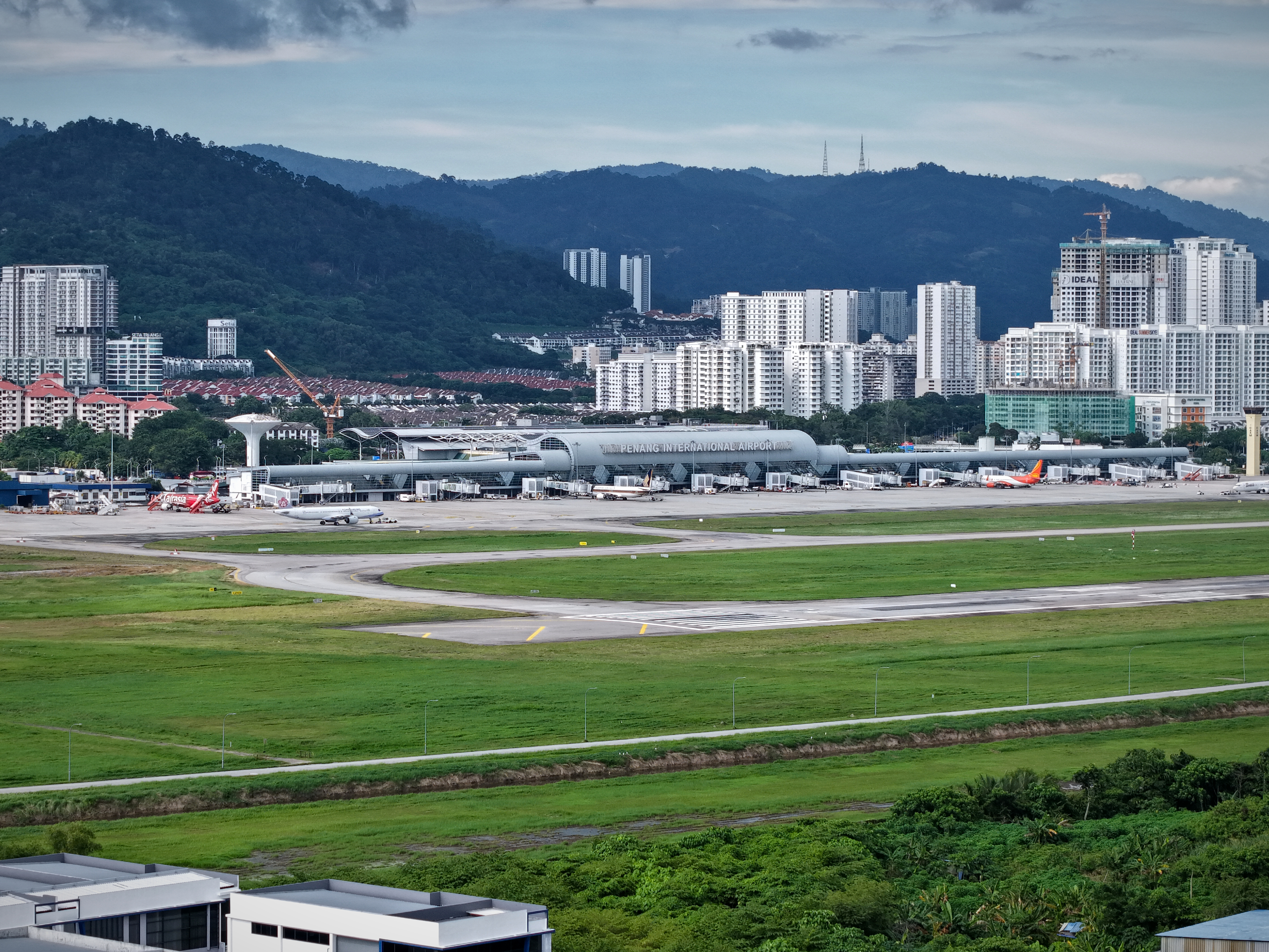
The Penang International Airport (PIA) has an annual capacity of 6.5 million passengers, but passenger traffic had already exceeded its capacity even before the COVID-19 pandemic.

The Penang International Airport (PIA) is located 16 km (9.9 mi) south of downtown George Town. It serves as the main airport for northwestern Malaysia, with services to major regional cities such as Kuala Lumpur, Singapore, Bangkok, Taipei, Hong Kong, Xiamen, Shanghai, Doha and Dubai. PIA is Malaysia's second busiest airport for aircraft movements and recorded more than 7.6 million passengers in 2024. It is also the country's second busiest in terms of cargo tonnage and handles the largest export volume of all entry points nationwide. As of 2025, the airport is being upgraded to raise its annual capacity from 6.5 million passengers to 12 million by 2028.

=== Sea ===
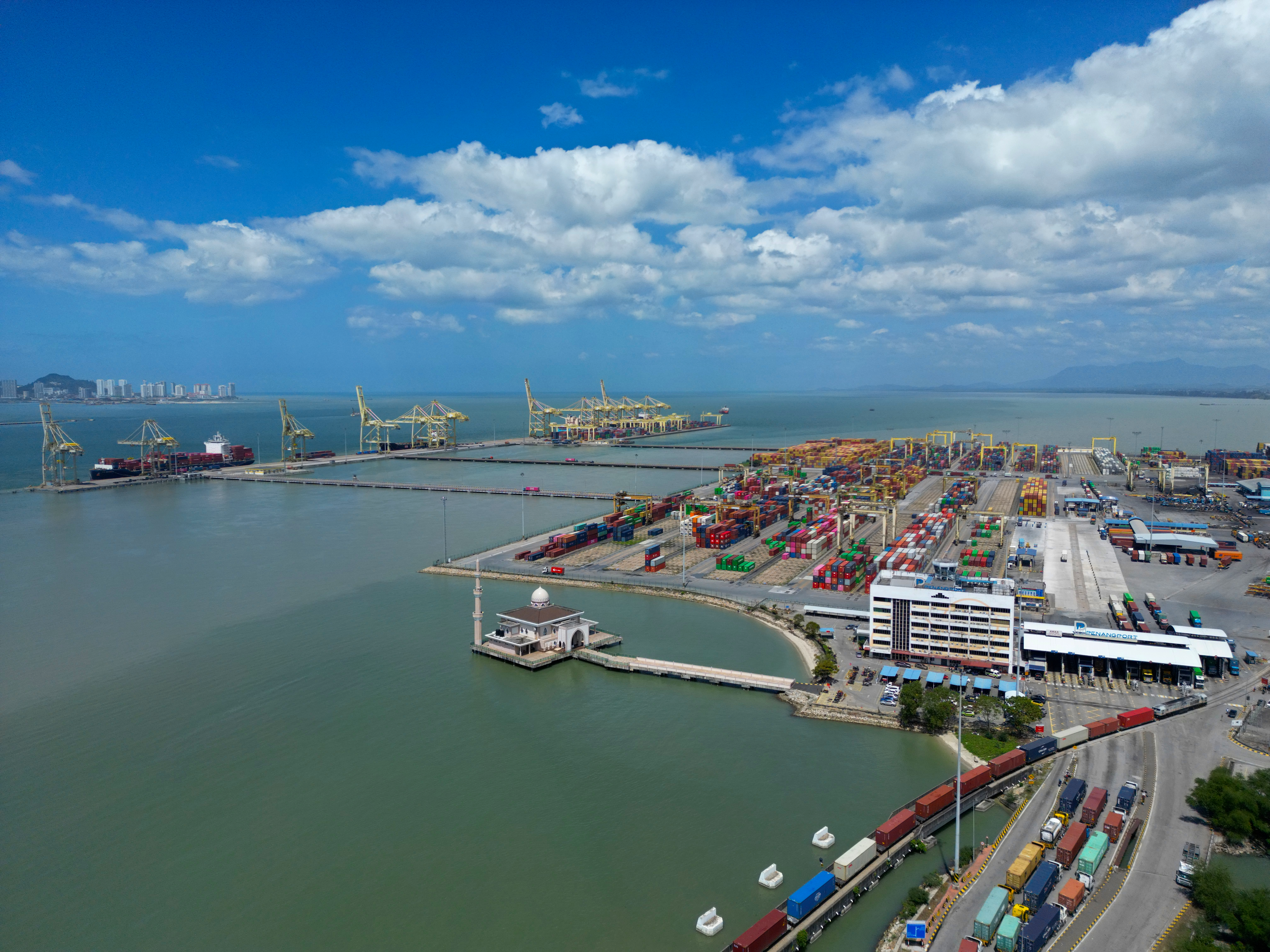
The Port of Penang was declared a Free Commercial Zone (FCZ) in 2021.

Formerly a vital British entrepôt, Penang's maritime trade has significantly declined due to the loss of George Town's free-port status in 1969 and the concurrent development of Port Klang near the federal capital Kuala Lumpur. Despite this, the Port of Penang remains the primary harbour for northwestern Malaysia and southern Thailand. It handled more than 1.4 million TEUs of cargo in 2024, the third highest among Malaysia's seaports.

Swettenham Pier, situated within downtown George Town, accommodates cruise ships and is one of the major entry points into the city. In 2017, Swettenham Pier recorded 125 port calls, surpassing Port Klang as the busiest cruise shipping terminal in Malaysia. The pier has attracted some of the world's largest cruise liners, such as the Queen Mary 2, and also sees occasional port visits by warships.

The cross-strait Penang ferry service connects George Town and Seberang Perai, and was formerly the only transportation link between the island city and the mainland until the completion of the Penang Bridge in 1985. At present, four ferries ply the Penang Strait between both cities daily.

== Demographics ==
Historical population
Year	Pop.	±%
1881	190,597	—
1891	231,224	+21.3%
1901	247,808	+7.2%
1911	270,537	+9.2%
1921	292,485	+8.1%
1931	340,259	+16.3%
1947	446,321	+31.2%
1957	572,100	+28.2%
1970	776,124	+35.7%
1980	954,638	+23.0%
1991	1,116,801	+17.0%
2000	1,313,449	+17.6%
2010	1,526,324	+16.2%
2020	1,740,405	+14.0%

As of 2020, Penang had a population of 1,740,405 and the highest population density of all Malaysian states at 1,659/km^{2} (4,300/sq mi). Penang is Malaysia's second most urbanised state, with an urbanisation level of 92.5%. Residents of Penang are colloquially known as Penangites or "Penang-lang".

54% of Penang's population resided in Seberang Perai, Malaysia's third largest city, while George Town was home to the remaining 46%. George Town serves as the core city of the George Town Conurbation, Malaysia's second largest metropolitan area.

In 2020, Penang recorded negative migration rate with more people leaving the state than it received. However, between 2015 and 2016, Penang had the highest migration effectiveness ratio among Malaysian states, due to the state's diversified economy. Most interstate immigrants came from Perak, Selangor, Kedah, Johor and Kuala Lumpur.

=== Ethnicities ===
Ethnic composition of Penang (2020)
Ethnicities / Nationality	Percentage
Chinese	41.3%
Malay	40.7%
Other Bumiputeras	0.5%
Indian	8.9%
Others	0.6%
Non-Malaysians	8.1%

As of 2020, ethnic Chinese and the Bumiputeras, which include Malays and indigenous East Malaysians, each constituted about 41% of Penang's population, while Indians made up nearly 9%. The Chinese community in Penang includes the Peranakan Chinese, a hybrid ethnicity known for their distinctive architecture, costumes and cuisine. The state is also home to a cosmopolitan mix of ethnic Eurasians, Siamese and Arabs.

Foreigners comprised 8% of Penang's population in 2020. Over 38% of Penang's expatriates resided within downtown George Town, Paya Terubong and Bayan Lepas. George Town's affordable living costs, natural destinations, health care infrastructure, an established ecosystem of multinational companies (MNCs) and the widespread use of English have been cited as pull factors for expatriates.

=== Languages ===
Malay is the official language of Penang. English once served as the official language during British rule and recently there have been calls to reinstate it as one of Penang's official languages. Tamil is the most widely spoken language among ethnic Indians, while Penang's Chinese population uses a variety of Chinese dialects such as Teochew, Hakka and Cantonese. Penang Hokkien serves as the lingua franca between the different ethnic groups in Penang, with efforts being made at the grassroots level to preserve its relevance.

=== Religions ===
Religions in Penang (2020)
Religion	Percentage
Islam	45.5%
Buddhism	37.6%
Hinduism	8.4%
Christianity	4.3%
Other	2.4%
No religion	1.7%

Penang, like other Peninsular states, has Islam as its official religion. Even so, Penang is one of two states in Malaysia where Islam is not in the majority, the other being Sarawak. As of 2020, Muslims constituted over 45% of Penang's population, followed by Buddhists at nearly 38%, Hindus at more than 8% and Christians at 4%.

Penang allows freedom of religion and religious assembly, and is one of three states to have a dedicated department for non-Muslim affairs. In 2021, the Penang state government formed the Penang Harmony Corporation to further enhance interreligious harmony in the state.

== Education ==
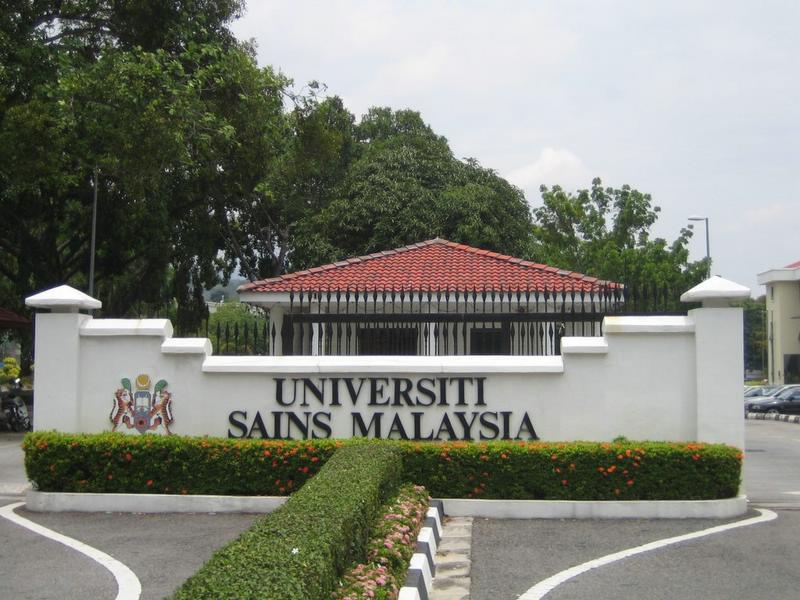
Universiti Sains Malaysia, Malaysia's second oldest tertiary institution, was founded in 1969.

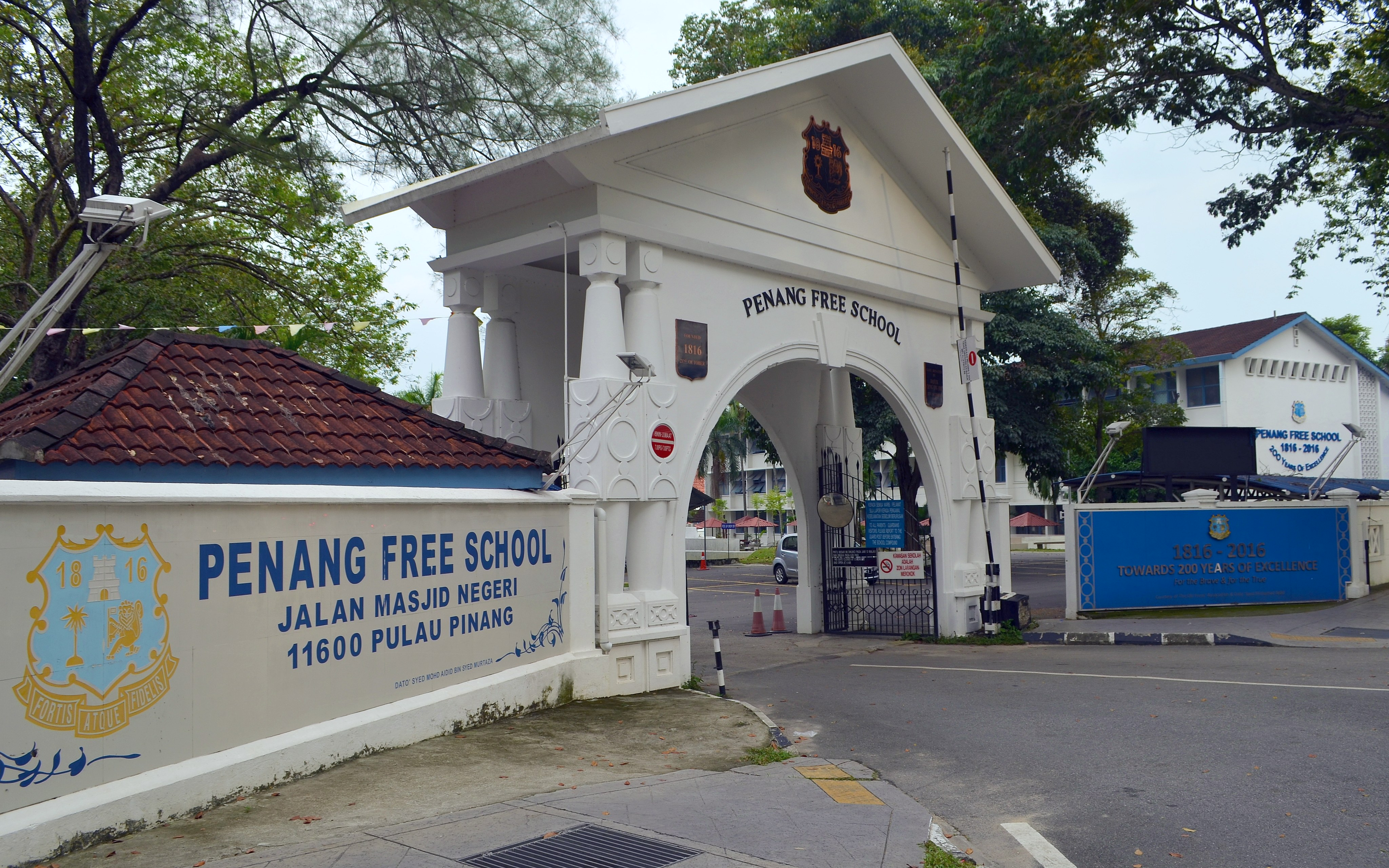
Penang Free School, founded in 1816, is the oldest English school in Southeast Asia.

As with the rest of Malaysia, Penang's education system falls under the purview of the federal government. While Malay and English are mandatory subjects in all schools, vernacular schools are also permitted to use either Mandarin or Tamil as the medium of instruction. Penang's literacy rate is the third highest in Malaysia after Kuala Lumpur and Selangor, standing at 99.5% as of 2014. Moreover, Penang's Human Development Index (HDI) value of 0.839 is also the second highest among Malaysian states.

Penang is home to 49 tertiary institutions (including universities, colleges, medical colleges, industrial training institutes and teaching schools), 13 international and expatriate schools, 128 secondary schools, 271 primary schools and 609 kindergartens. George Town is home to some of Malaysia's oldest schools. Established in 1816, Penang Free School (PFS) is the oldest English school in Southeast Asia. British colonial rule had also encouraged the growth of mission schools in George Town such as St. Xavier's Institution, St. George's Girls' School and Methodist Boys' School.

Penang is also a pioneer in Malaysia's present-day Chinese education system, with the establishment of its first Chinese school in 1819. Prominent Chinese schools in the state include Chung Ling High School, Penang Chinese Girls' High School, Heng Ee High School and Jit Sin High School, among others. In addition, George Town has 13 international and expatriate schools that offer either British, American or International Baccalaureate syllabuses.

Universiti Sains Malaysia (USM) is the premier public university in Penang. As of 2025, it is ranked 146th in the QS World University Rankings, third in Malaysia after Universiti Malaya and Universiti Kebangsaan Malaysia. Most of the other tertiary institutions in the state are privately-run, including Wawasan Open University, Han Chiang University College of Communication, DISTED College and RCSI & UCD Malaysia Campus. RECSAM, one of the 26 specialist institutions of the Southeast Asian Ministers of Education Organization, is headquartered in George Town.

The Penang Public Library Corporation is the state government body tasked with the operation of public libraries throughout the state. In 2016, the Penang state government launched Malaysia's first digital library, situated within the grounds of PFS. Similar digital libraries have since been built at various locations throughout the state.

== Healthcare ==
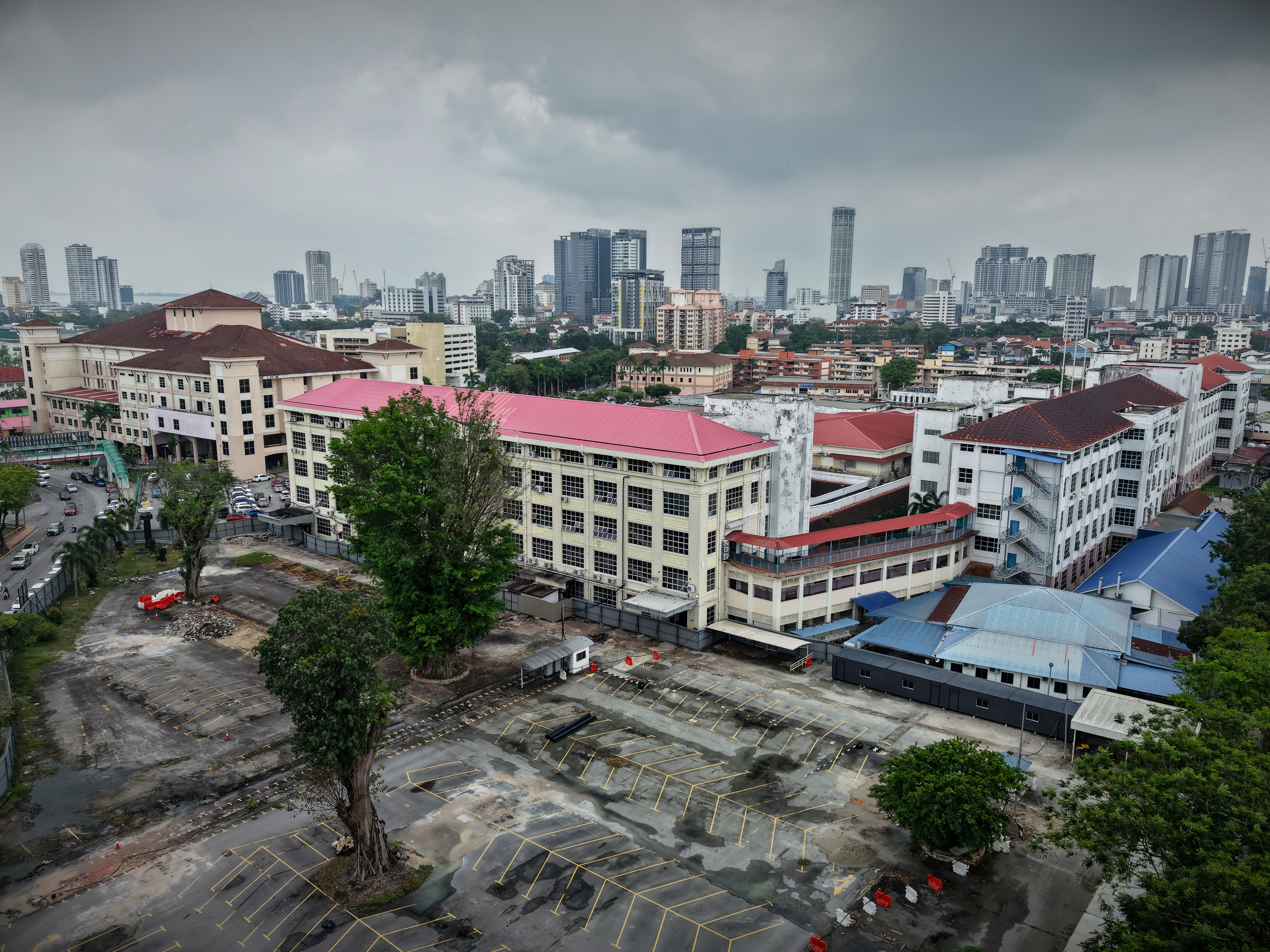
Penang General Hospital in George Town is a 1,100-bedded tertiary referral hospital within northwestern Malaysia.

Health care in Penang is provided by a two-tier system consisting of public and private hospitals. The Penang General Hospital, administered and funded by the Malaysian Ministry of Health, is the main tertiary referral hospital within northwestern Malaysia. It is supported by five other public hospitals in Penang, all of which also come under the administration of the country's Ministry of Health.

In addition, Penang has 19 private hospitals that offer specialist services, making the state the leading hub for medical tourism in Malaysia. The total number of beds in public and private hospitals in Penang is 4,329, or nearly 248.7 beds per 10,000 people, higher than the national average. While private hospitals in Penang operate independently of the Ministry of Health, there have been instances of public-private cooperation, such as during the COVID-19 pandemic which saw private hospitals sharing equipment and taking in non-COVID-19 patients in need of urgent medical procedures.

The infant mortality rate in Penang has decreased significantly, dropping by 85% between 1970 and 2000 to 5.7 per 1,000 live births. Similarly, the neonatal mortality rate has also decreased by 84.7% during the corresponding period to 4.1 per 1,000 live births. As of 2023, the life expectancy at birth in Penang is 71.9 years for men and 77.2 years for women. According to an official survey in 2019, Penang recorded one of the lowest obesity rates in Malaysia, with an obesity rate of 18.6%.

== Culture ==
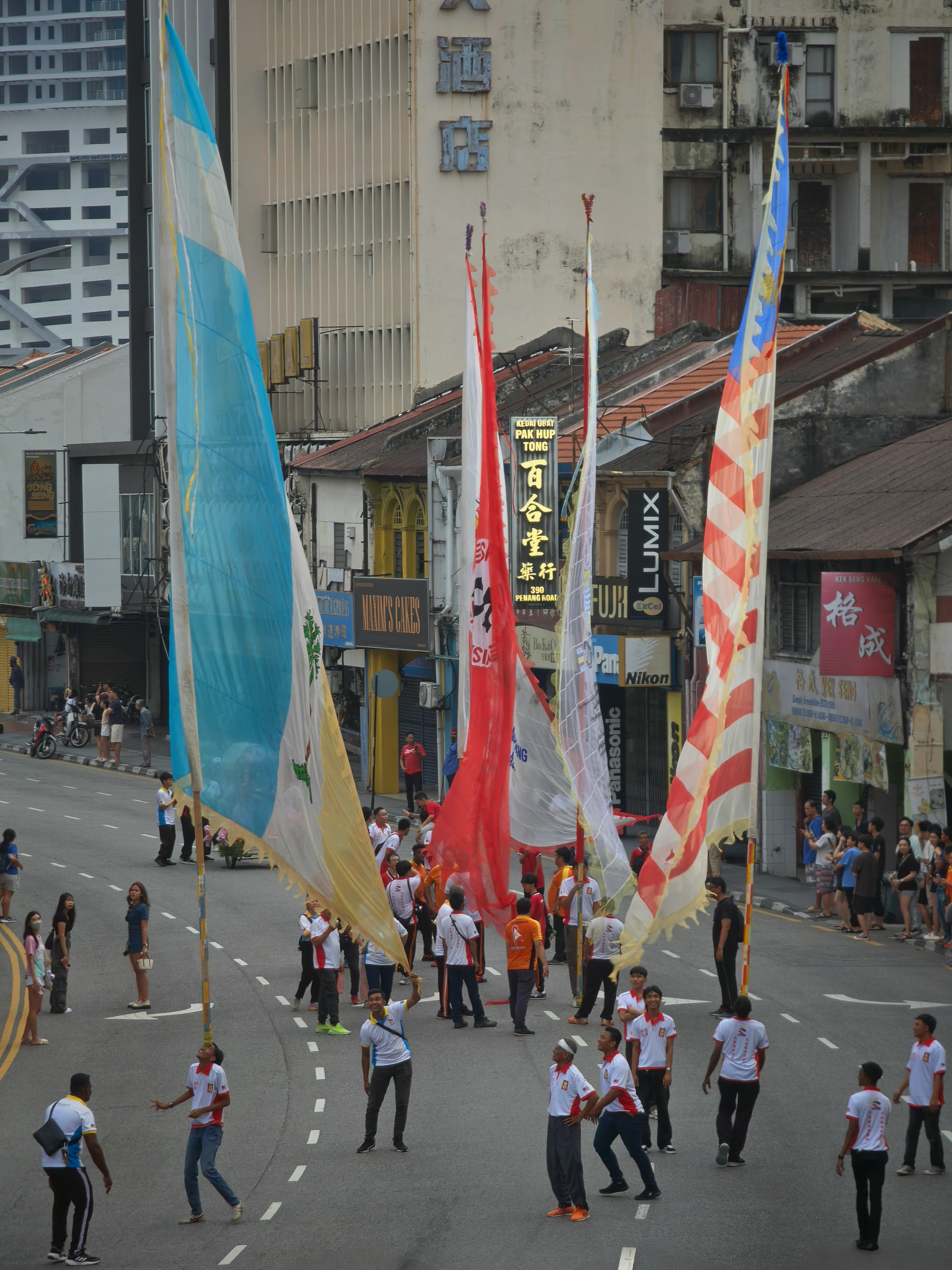
A Chingay troupe in George Town. To this day, the Chingay parade continues to be a major expression of Penang Chinese identity.

=== Festivals ===
Penang's cosmopolitan society results in a great number of celebrations and festivities throughout the year. The state hosts major cultural and religious events, including Chinese New Year, Eid al-Fitri, Diwali, Thaipusam, Vaisakhi, Christmas, Vesak and Songkran. Chinese New Year celebrations last for 15 days and are marked with festivities unique to the state, such as the birthday of the Jade Emperor, and the annual opening of Chinese ancestral halls and associations in George Town. The 15th and final day of Chinese New Year is celebrated with a Peranakan Chinese-inspired Lantern Festival.

George Town is credited as the origin of a unique form of the Chingay procession, which involves participants balancing oversized flags on their heads or hands. A state-held Chingay parade takes place in George Town annually, although Chingay performances are also frequently included in Chinese festivals and significant state events throughout Penang.

Expatriates residing in Penang have introduced their celebrations to the state. Bon Odori, a Japanese festival celebrated annually in George Town, has gained popularity among locals. St. Patrick's Day and Oktoberfest, traditionally celebrated by ethnic Irish and German communities respectively, are also celebrated in the city.

Penang also hosts several major festivals each year, including the George Town Festival which has become one of the largest arts events in Southeast Asia since its inaugural event in 2010. In 2018, the George Town Literary Festival became the first Southeast Asian literary event to achieve the international Literary Festival Award at the London Book Fair.

=== Arts ===
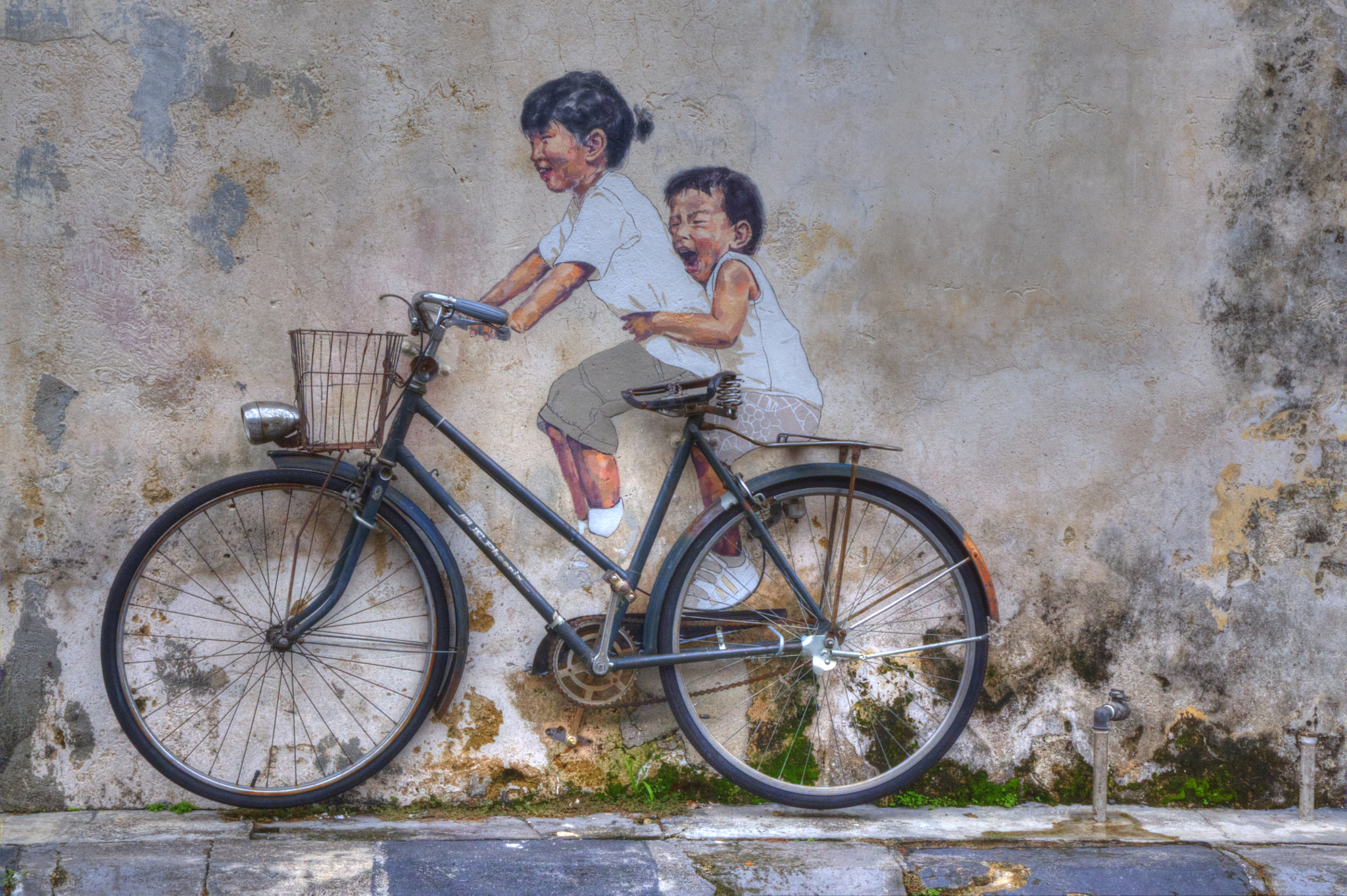
Ernest Zacharevic's Children on a Bicycle at Armenian Street in George Town. This mural was among The Guardian's compilation of graffiti destinations worldwide in 2013.

Bangsawan is a form of Malay theatre that originated in Penang at the end of the 19th century, and incorporates Indian, Western, Islamic, Chinese and Indonesian influences. It was a popular outdoor performance in the 1920s. Another unique form of theatre that began in Penang is boria, which features singing accompanied by violin, maracas and tabla. Boria reached the height of its popularity in the 1930s and was typically performed as a form of satire. While the British imposed a ban on boria in Singapore and Malacca, the art form was never banned in Penang.

Apart from traditional forms of art, the Penang Philharmonic Orchestra, funded by the state, was established in 2010 to elevate the standard of classical music in Penang. Dewan Sri Pinang and Setia SPICE in George Town are the main venues for performing arts and concerts within the state.

George Town is a hub for the arts and culture scene in Malaysia. The inscription of parts of George Town as a UNESCO World Heritage Site has enhanced cultural and creative industries within the city. In 2012, Lithuanian artist Ernest Zacharevic created a series of six wall paintings depicting local culture, inhabitants and lifestyles as part of the George Town Festival. The city is also adorned with 52 wrought iron caricatures and 18 wall murals that showcase the city's history and the daily lives of the local community. Additionally, art exhibitions are held at the city's event spaces like the Hin Bus Depot and Sia Boey.

Penang's literary heritage stems from the colonial-era Peranakan Chinese literature and its role as a translation hub in Malaya, where prior to World War II, the publishing industry facilitated the translation of Chinese and Western literary works into Malay. Post-independence, the state's literary scene has diversified, with independent local publishers and retailers such as Areca Books, Gerakbudaya and the George Town World Heritage Incorporated running alongside major bookstore chains like Popular Holdings and MPH Group.

=== Media ===
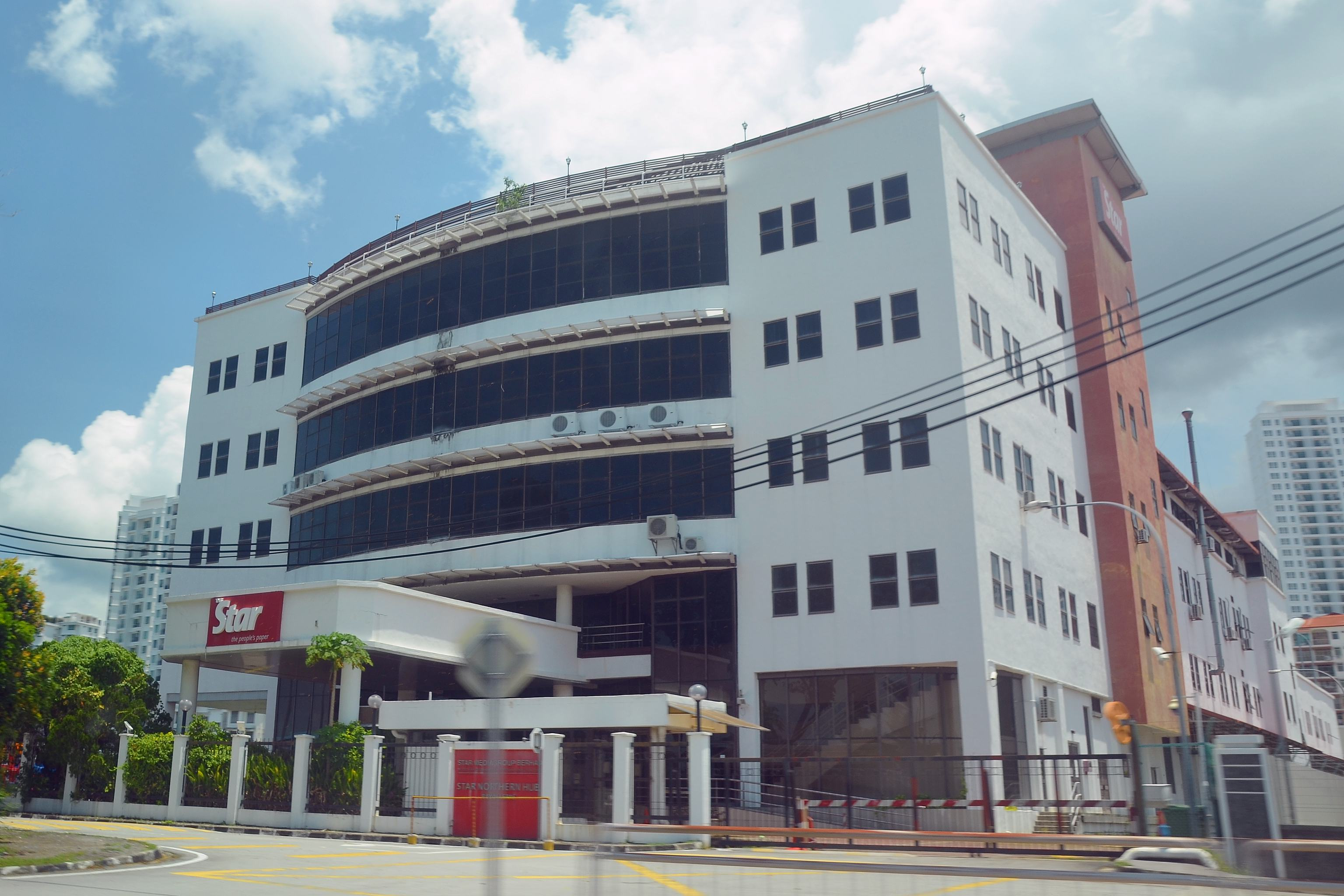
The Star's Northern Hub in George Town. One of the major English dailies in Malaysia, it had been known for its "liberal flavour" prior to a government crackdown in 1987.

George Town was once the hub of Malaysia's print press. The nation's first newspaper, the Prince of Wales Island Gazette, was founded in the city in 1806. Under British rule, Penang had relatively more press freedom as compared to Singapore, which had a stronger government apparatus.

The Star, one of Malaysia's top English dailies, started as a regional newspaper that was first published in George Town in the 1970s, while the country's oldest Chinese newspaper, Kwong Wah Yit Poh, was also established in the city in 1910. In addition, the Penang state government publishes its own multi-lingual newspaper, Buletin Mutiara, which is distributed for free every fortnight. The newspaper focuses on current issues within Penang, providing valuable information and insights for the local community.

The well-preserved colonial-era cityscape has made George Town a popular filming location for movies and television series that depict Asian culture. Films and series that were filmed within the city include Crazy Rich Asians, Anna and the King, Lust, Caution, The Little Nyonya and You Mean the World to Me; the latter was the first movie to be produced entirely in Penang Hokkien. George Town was also featured as a pit-stop in The Amazing Race 16, The Amazing Race Asia 5 and The Amazing Race Australia 7.

=== Architecture ===
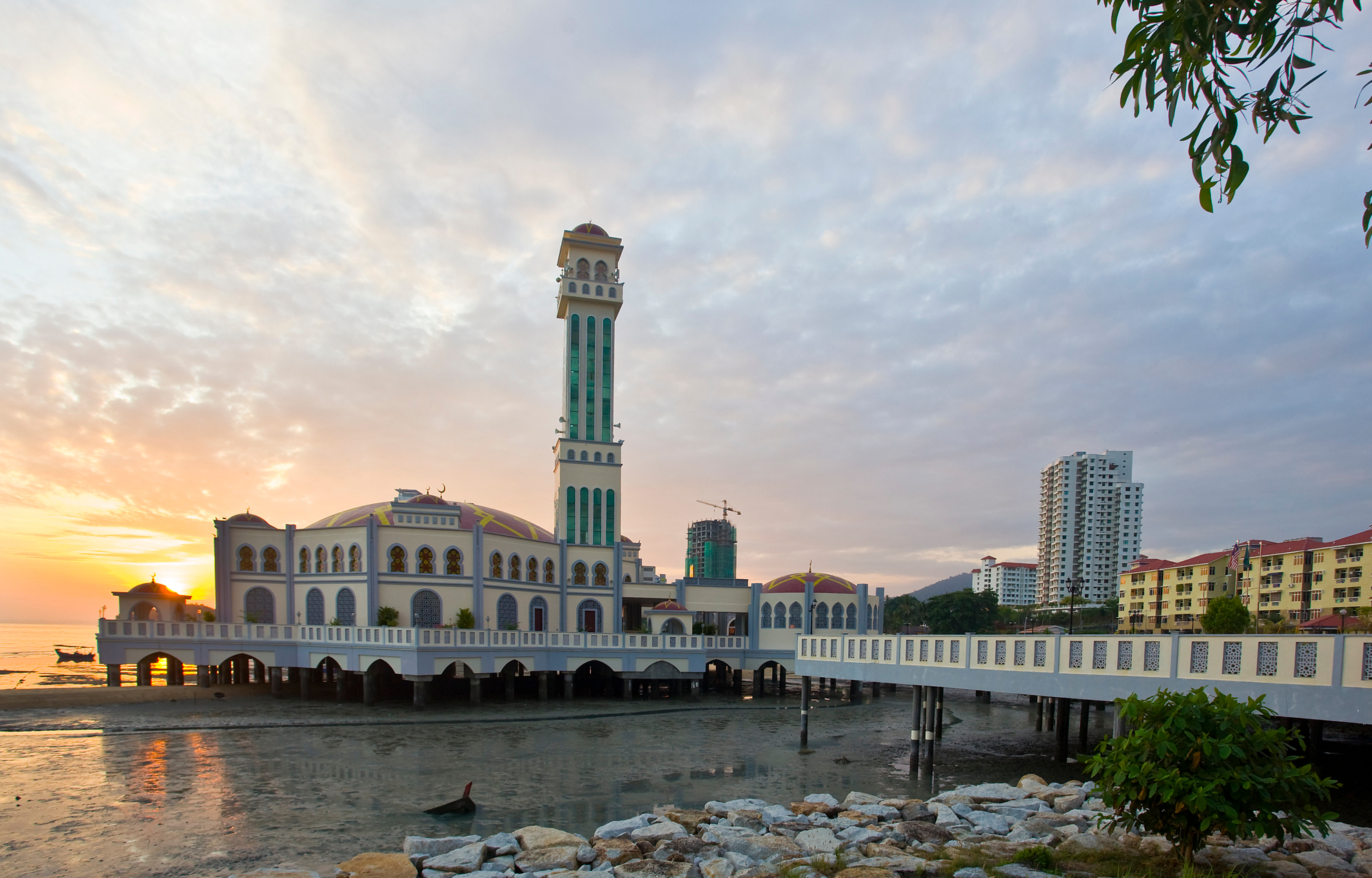
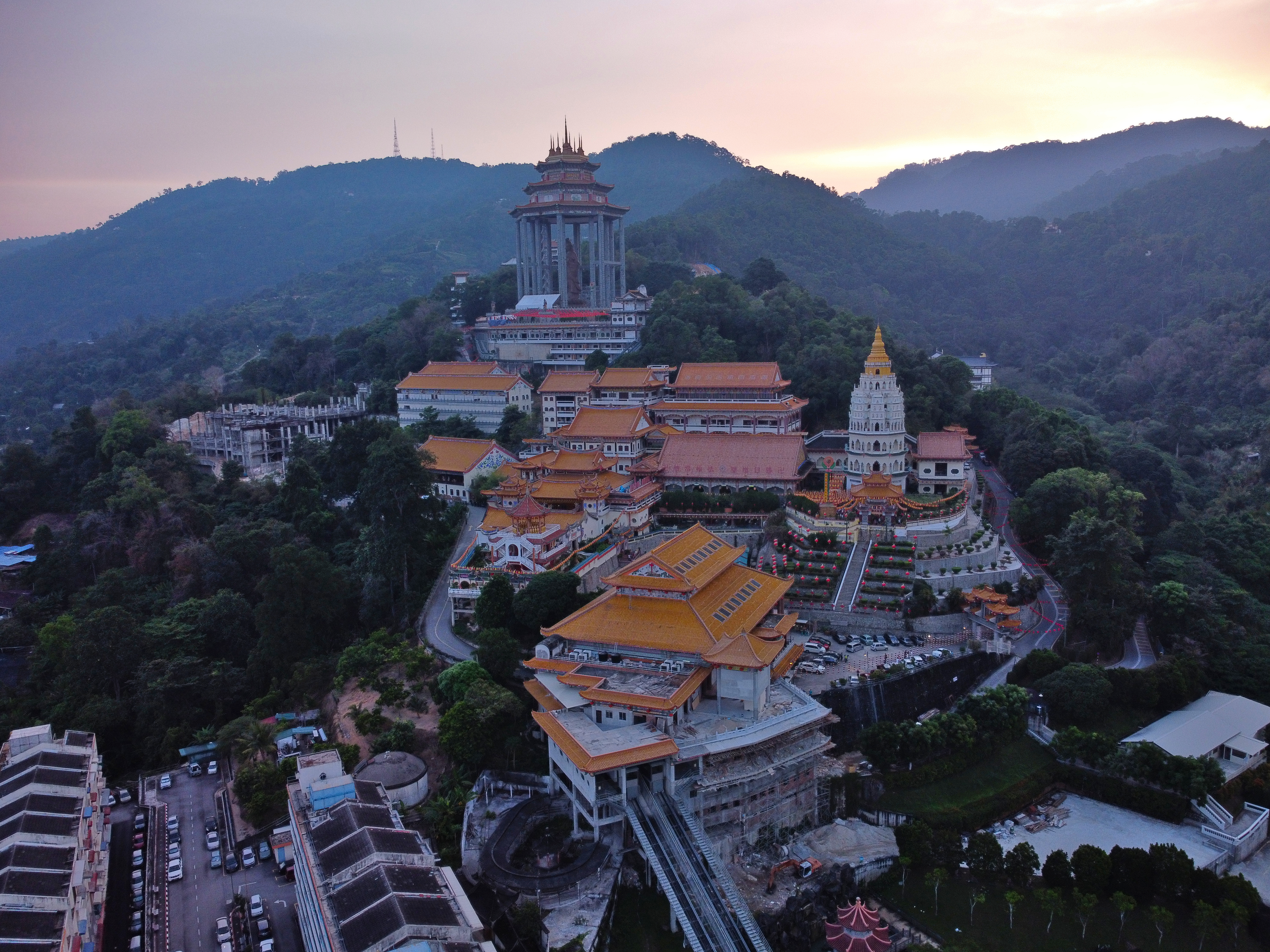
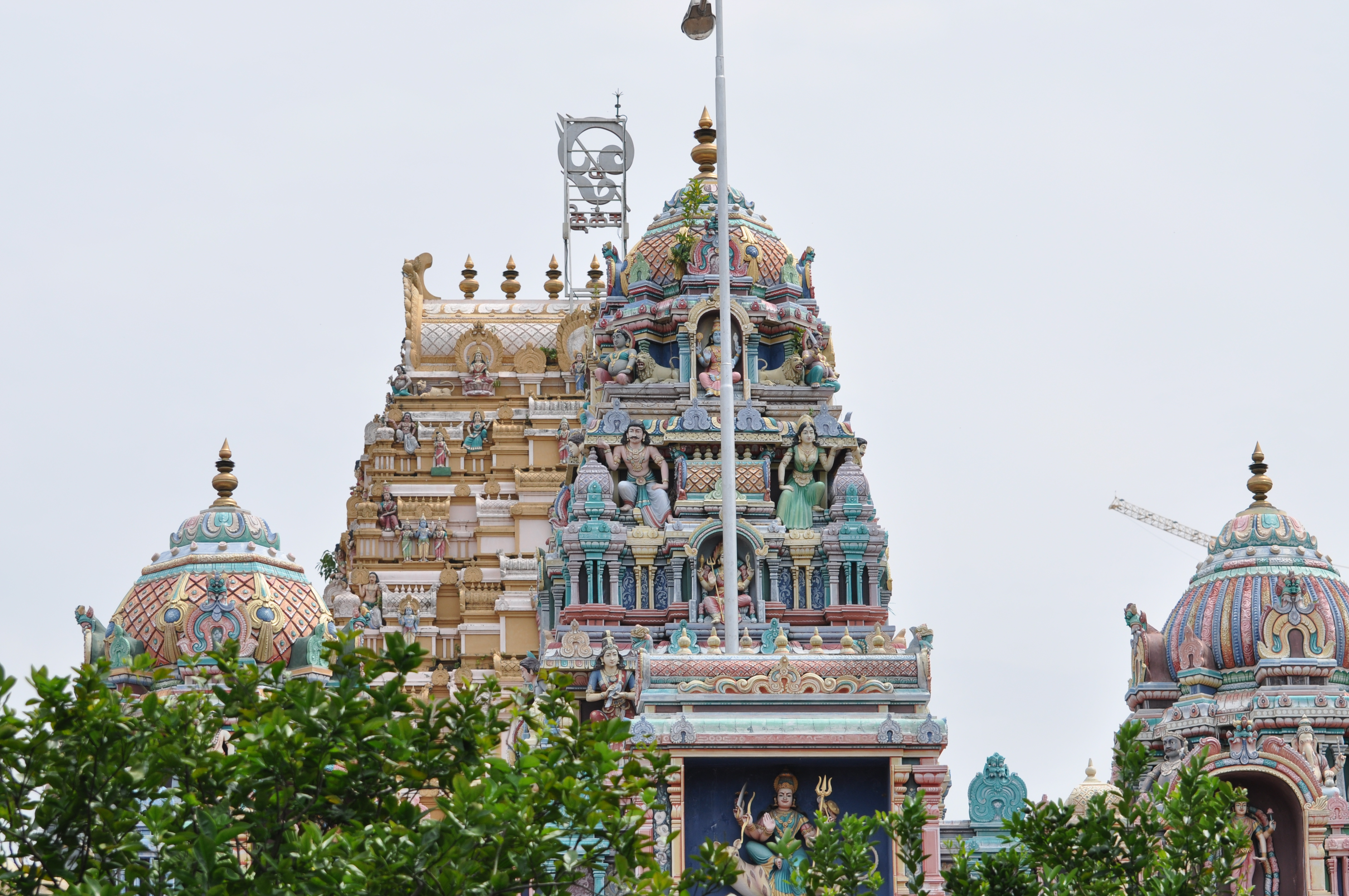
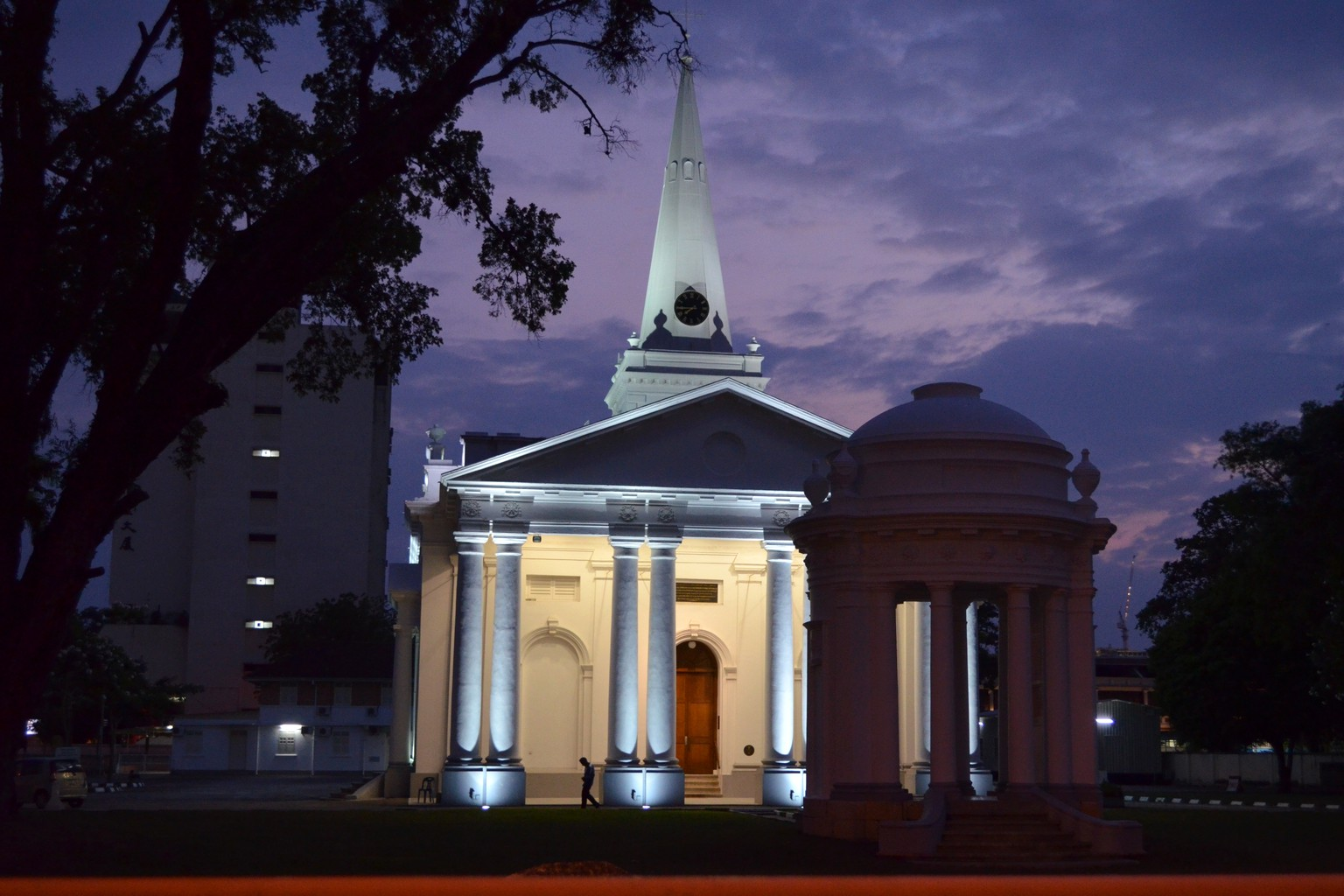
Clockwise from top left: Tanjong Bungah Floating Mosque, Kek Lok Si, St. George's Church and Arulmigu Karumariamman Temple

In 2008, UNESCO gazetted nearly 260 ha (2.6 km^{2}) within downtown George Town as a World Heritage Site. The city centre is recognised by UNESCO for its "unique architectural and cultural townscape without parallel anywhere in East and Southeast Asia". Shophouses sit alongside Anglo-Indian bungalows, mosques, temples, churches, and European-style administrative and commercial complexes, forming the city's multicultural framework. Elsewhere within the city, Siamese and Burmese cultures are prominently displayed at places of worship such as Wat Chayamangkalaram, Dhammikarama Burmese Temple and Kek Lok Si.

Apart from the colonial-era architecture, George Town is home to most of Penang's skyscrapers, including Komtar Tower, Marriott Residences and Muze @ PICC. There has been rising demand for residential high-rises at the suburbs since 2015, driven by the growing need for strata housing and the city's thriving economy.

=== Cuisine ===
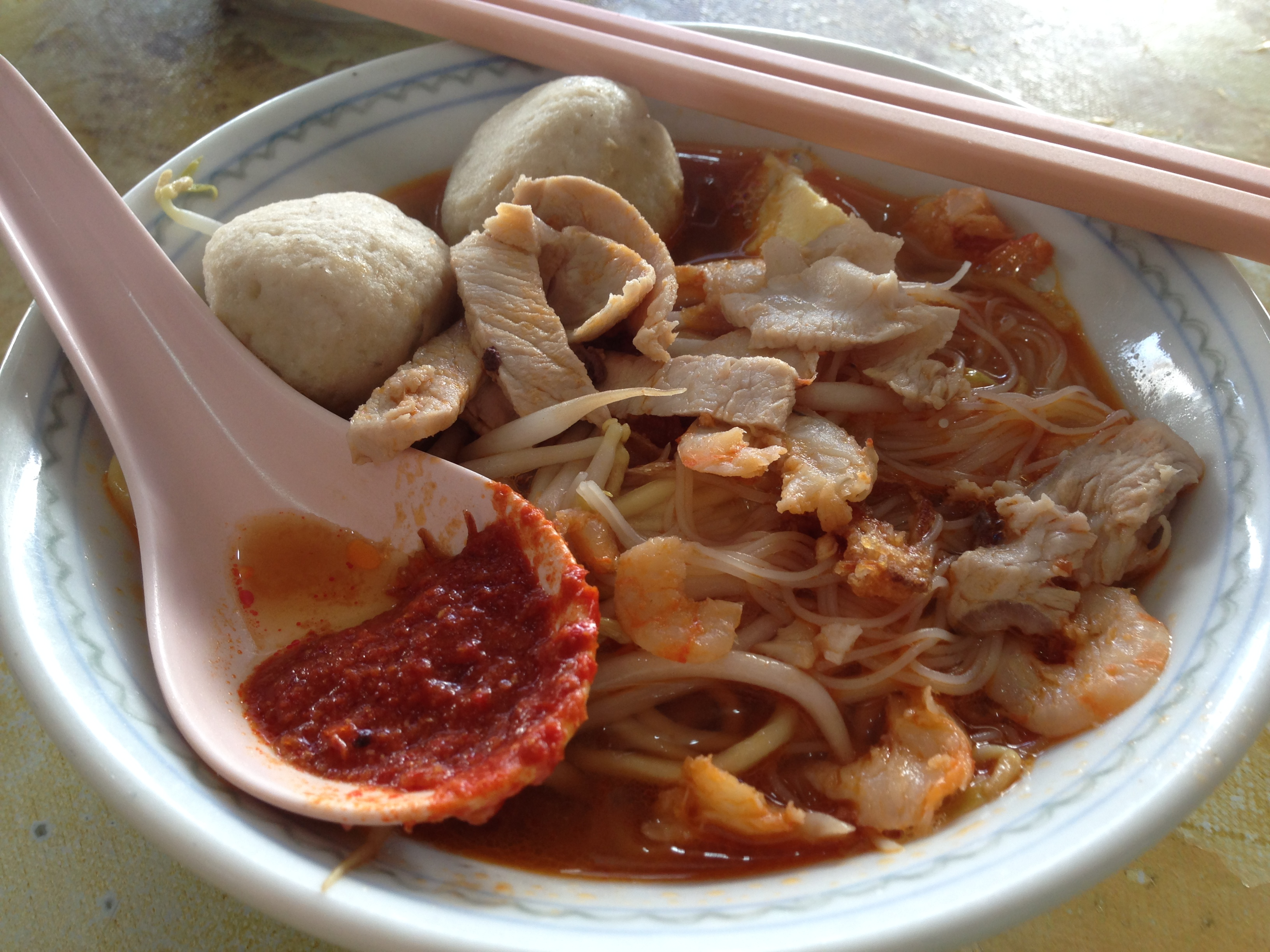
A bowl of Penang Hokkien mee

Penang's culinary scene incorporates Malay, Chinese, Indian, Peranakan and Thai influences, evident in the variety of street food that includes char kway teow, asam laksa and nasi kandar. Described by CNN as "the food capital of Malaysia", George Town was also listed by Time and Lonely Planet as one of the best in Asia for street food. According to Time in 2004, only in the city "could food this good be this cheap". Robin Barton of the Lonely Planet remarked that the city was a "culinary epicentre of the many cultures that arrived after it was set up as a trading port in 1786, from Malays to Indians, Acehenese to Chinese, Burmese to Thais".

Over the years, Penang's culinary scene has expanded to include fine dining establishments, adding to its already diverse street food options. In 2022, the Michelin Guide made its debut in the state, in recognition of its "small-scale restaurants and street food that embodies Malaysia's distinctive streetside dining culture". The 2025 edition of the Michelin Guide features 69 eateries throughout the state.

=== Sports ===
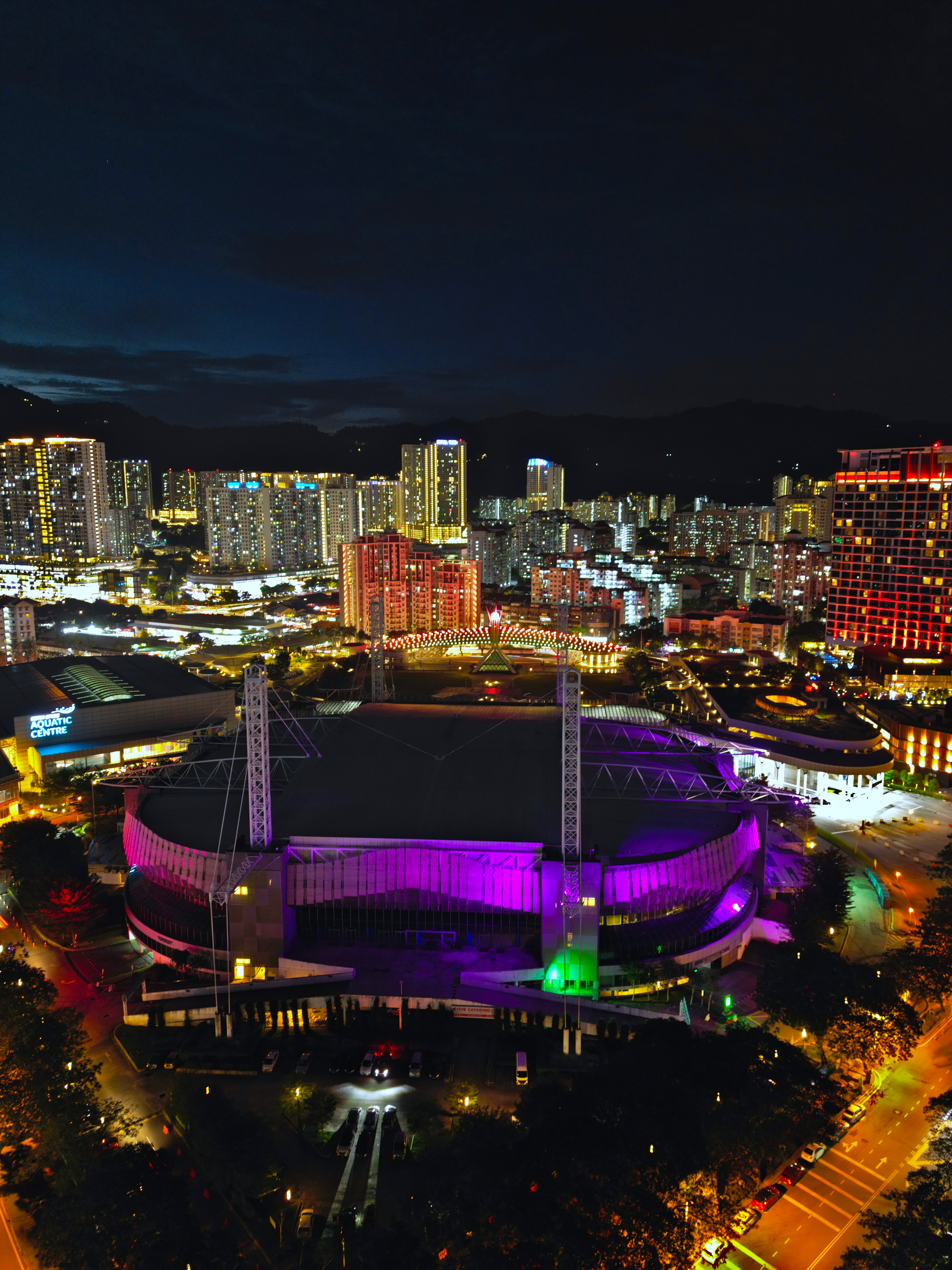
Setia SPICE is also one of the major venues in Penang for business events.

Despite its small size, Penang has hosted regional and international sporting events, such as the 2001 SEA Games, 2013 Women's World Open Squash Championship and Asia's first Masters Games in 2018. The state represents itself with its own sports teams in the interstate Sukma Games.

Penang is home to a variety of sports facilities. The Penang State Stadium in Seberang Perai is the state's main stadium, while the City Stadium in George Town is the home ground of Penang FC. Setia SPICE in George Town is another major sporting venue, consisting of an indoor arena and an aquatics centre. The city is also home to Malaysia's oldest equestrian centre – the Penang Turf Club, which was established in 1864.

Major annual sporting events in Penang include the Penang International Dragon Boat Festival and the Penang Bridge International Marathon. The Penang International Dragon Boat Festival takes place every December and attracts participants from abroad. The Penang Bridge International Marathon, which features the iconic Penang Bridge as its route, has also gained international recognition, attracting about 20,000 participants from 61 countries in 2023.

== Notable people ==
Penang is the birthplace of Malaysian and Singaporean professionals and politicians, including:

- Chan Kim Boon (1851–1920), novelist and translator
- Wu Lien-teh (1879–1960), physician and inventor of the respiratory mask
- Hon Sui Sen (1916–1983), former cabinet minister in Singapore
- Wee Chong Jin (1917–2005), first Chief Justice of Singapore
- P. Ramlee (1929–1973), actor, filmmaker, musician, composer and icon of Malay-language entertainment
- Glynn Edwards (1931–2018), British actor; best known for playing the part of Dave Harris, the barman in The Winchester Club in Minder
- Abdullah Ahmad Badawi (1939–2025), fifth Prime Minister of Malaysia
- Karpal Singh (1940–2014), lawyer, politician and former national chairman of the Democratic Action Party
- Lim Pik-Sen (born 1944), British actress
- Anwar Ibrahim (born 1947), tenth and current prime minister of Malaysia
- Jimmy Choo (born 1948), fashion designer appointed as an OBE
- David Arumugam (born 1950), singer and founder of the pop band Alleycats
- Yeohlee Teng (born 1951), American fashion designer
- Khaw Boon Wan (born 1952), former cabinet minister in Singapore
- Tan Hock Eng (born 1952), chief executive officer of Broadcom
- Sultan Nazrin Shah (born 1956), reigning monarch of the neighbouring state of Perak
- Ooi Keat Gin (born 1959), academician and historian
- Saw Teong Hin (born 1962), film director
- Tan Twan Eng (born 1972), award-winning novelist
- Nicol David (born 1983), former world number one female squash player
- Mamak Puteh (born 1984), actor and comedian
- Loh Kean Yew (born 1997), Singaporean badminton player

== Sources ==
- Barber, Andrew (2010). Penang At War : A History of Penang During and Between the First and Second World Wars 1914–1945. AB&B. ISBN 978-983-43372-3-0.
- Bayly, Christopher (2004). Forgotten Armies: The Fall of British Asia, 1941–1945. Allen Lane. ISBN 978-0-7139-9463-6.
- Jenkins, Gwynn (2008). Contested Space: Cultural Heritage and Identity Reconstructions: Conservation Strategies Within a Developing Asian City. LIT Verlag. ISBN 978-3-8258-1366-6.
- Jou, Sue-Ching; Michael Hsiao, Hsin-Huang; Aveline-Dubach, Natacha (2014). Globalization and New Intra-Urban Dynamics in Asian Cities. National Taiwan University. ISBN 978-986-350-021-6.
- Hockton, Keith (2012). Penang: An Inside Guide to Its Historic Homes, Buildings, Monuments and Parks. MPH Group. ISBN 978-967-415-303-8.
- Khoo, Su Nin (2007). Streets of George Town, Penang. Areca Books. ISBN 978-983-9886-00-9.
- Lewis Su, Lin (2016). Cities in Motion: Urban Life and Cosmopolitanism in Southeast Asia, 1920–1940. Cambridge University Press. ISBN 978-1-107-10833-2.
- Langdon, Marcus (2014). George Town's Historic Commercial and Civic Precincts. George Town World Heritage Incorporated. ISBN 978-967-12281-2-8.
- Ooi, Kee Beng; Goh, Ban Lee (2010). Pilot Studies for a New Penang. ISEAS – Yusof Ishak Institute. ISBN 978-981-4279-69-7.
- Francis, Ric (2006). Penang Trams, Trolleybuses & Railways: Municipal Transport History, 1880s–1963. Areca Books. ISBN 978-983-42834-0-7.
