= Penang Hill Corporation =

Statutory body in the Malaysian state of Penang

- Logo of Penang Hill Corporation

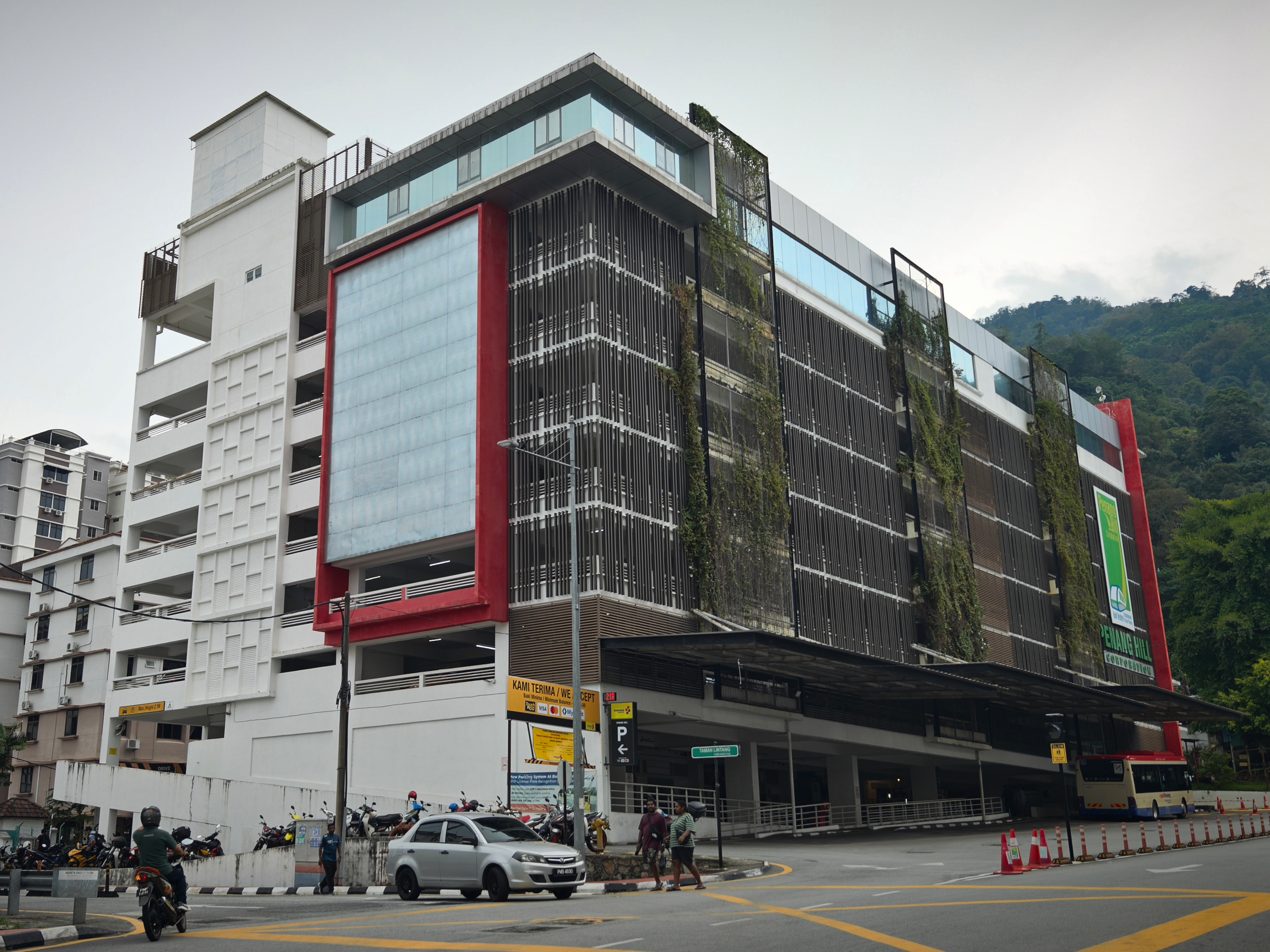
- Headquarters at Ayer Itam in George Town, Penang
- Native name: Perbadanan Bukit Bendera Pulau Pinang
- Company type: Statutory body
- Founded: 2009; 17 years ago
- Headquarters: Penang Hill Corporation Building, Jalan Stesen Bukit Bendera, Ayer Itam, George Town, Penang, Malaysia
- Key people: Chow Kon Yeow (Chairman); Cheok Lay Leng (General manager)
- Parent: Penang state government
- Website: corporate.penanghill.gov.my/index.php/en/

The Penang Hill Corporation (abbrev. PHC) is a statutory body in the Malaysian state of Penang. Established in 2009, it serves as the administrative authority for Penang Hill, a UNESCO Biosphere Reserve since 2021, and operates the Penang Hill Railway. The corporation is chaired by the Chief Minister of Penang, who acts as its chairman.

== Background ==
During Chief Minister Lim Chong Eu's tenure, an advisory board was formed under the Penang State Executive Council to manage the Penang Hill Railway. Nonetheless, no government agency was designated for the management of the hill itself. In 1987, the Penang Island Municipal Council (now Penang Island City Council) proposed the conservation of Penang Hill "as a hill resort by improving and increasing the various lookout points and by the establishment and improvement of paths and walkways, gardens, natural areas and other facilities".

However, there were concurrent efforts since the 1980s to privatise the management of Penang Hill. In 1990, Bukit Pinang Leisure, a subsidiary of Berjaya Corporation founded by Vincent Tan, entered into a memorandum of understanding with the Penang state government to develop 900 acres (360 ha) of Penang Hill into a recreational hill station. The proposed development included plans for shopping malls, theme parks and a golf course. This sparked concerns that such development would compromise the relatively tranquil nature of the hill, leading to public outcry as Penang's civil societies united to oppose the project.

The proposed development had ramifications in the 1990 state election, which saw Chief Minister Lim losing his seat, despite his Barisan Nasional (BN) coalition retaining a majority in Penang's legislature. Lim was succeeded as Chief Minister by Koh Tsu Koon. In response to public pressure, federal government environmental regulators rejected Berjaya's proposal in 1991 and a scaled-down version of the proposal was also rejected several months later. Under Chief Minister Koh, the state government enacted the Penang Hill Local Plan in 1997, which permitted the establishment of retail and accommodation facilities on the hill.

In 2007, another proposal was announced to build the RM25 billion Penang Global City Centre at the site of the nearby Penang Turf Club. Public opposition to the project contributed to Pakatan Rakyat (predecessor to the present-day Pakatan Harapan coalition) winning control of Penang's legislature from BN in the 2008 state election. Newly-elected Chief Minister Lim Guan Eng sought a partnership with Penang's civil societies to pursue a progressive agenda that included the conservation of Penang Hill. It was then decided to combine civil society engagement with corporatisation to facilitate necessary staffing and attract philanthropic investments.

== History ==
In 2009, Penang's legislature passed the Penang Hill Corporation (PHC) Enactment, which provided for the establishment of a statutory board to oversee the development of Penang Hill and manage the Penang Hill Railway service. The PHC was established within that year, with Penang's Chief Minister serving as the chairman. The PHC's scope includes recreational and tourism developments on the hill, as well as the maintenance of the funicular railway assets, which are the oldest in Malaysia. Infrastructure remains under the purview of the Penang Island City Council and the state Public Works Department.

In 2016, the Penang state government gazetted a Special Area Plan for Penang Hill, which serves as a guideline for sustainable development while limiting developments that may compromise the hill's environment. Following this, efforts were initiated to designate Penang Hill as a nature reserve, spearheaded by the PHC. In 2021, Penang Hill, along with nearby areas such as the Ayer Itam and Teluk Bahang dams, the Penang Botanic Gardens and the Penang National Park, was designated as a UNESCO Biosphere Reserve, making it Malaysia's third such reserve after Chini Lake and the Crocker Mountains. The PHC also jointly undertook the upgrading of the funicular railway with the federal Ministry of Tourism, resulting in the launch of a larger capacity single-section system in 2011.

== See also ==
- George Town World Heritage Incorporated
- InvestPenang
- Penang Development Corporation
- Penang Skills Development Centre
- Penang Water Supply Corporation
