= Penang Development Corporation =

Economic development corporation in the Malaysian state of Penang

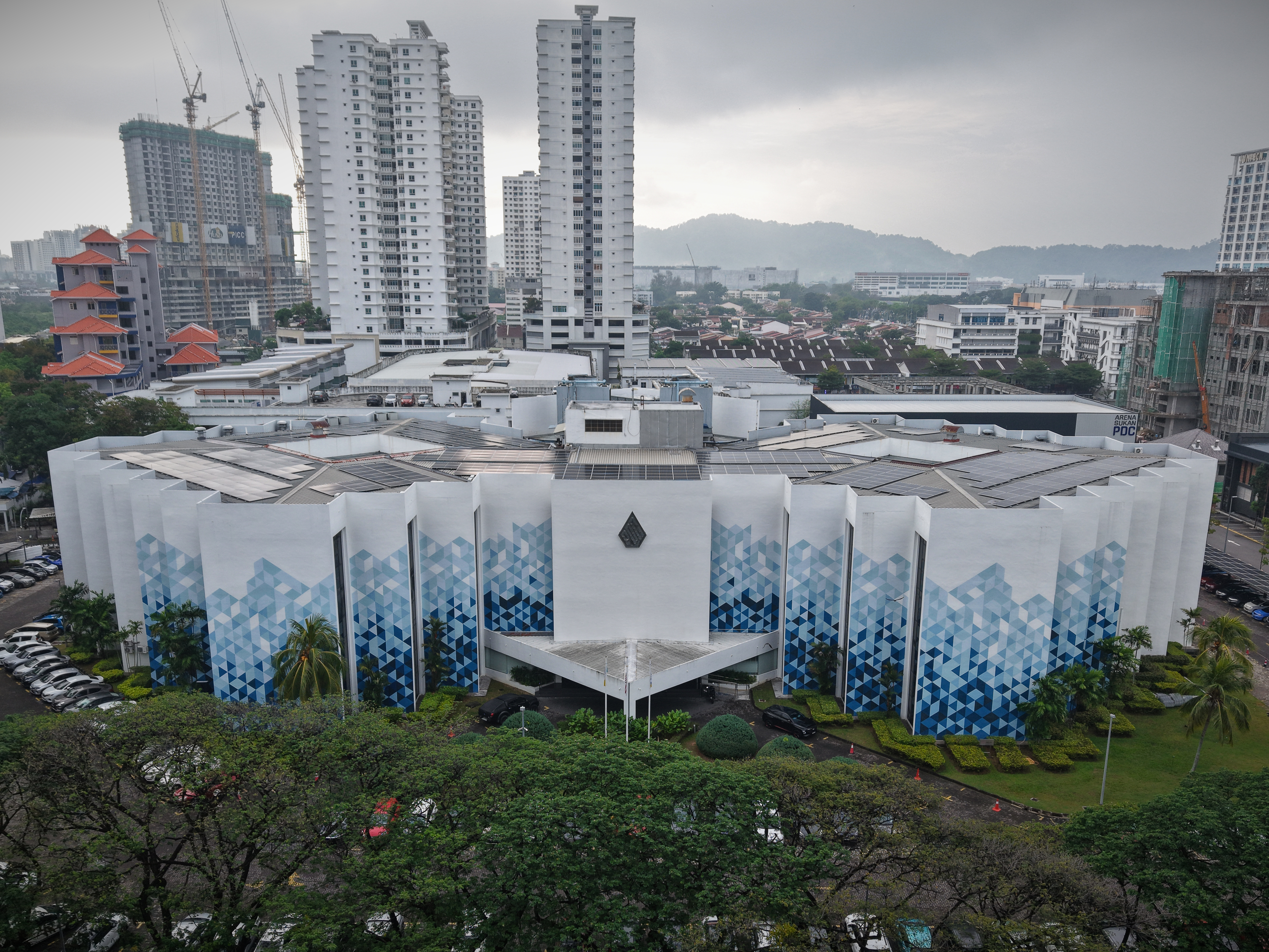
- Headquarters at Bayan Lepas in George Town, Penang
- Native name: Perbadanan Pembangunan Pulau Pinang
- Company type: State-owned economic development corporation
- Founded: 17 November 1969; 56 years ago
- Headquarters: Tun Dr Lim Chong Eu Building, Bayan Lepas, George Town, Penang, Malaysia
- Key people: Chow Kon Yeow; (Chairman); Aziz Bakar; (CEO)
- Revenue: ▲RM527.1 million (2024)
- Net income: ▲RM208.5 million (2023)
- Total assets: ▼RM5.603 billion (2023)
- Total equity: ▲RM5.693 billion (2023)
- Number of employees: 396 (2023)
- Parent: Penang state government
- Website: pdc.gov.my

The Penang Development Corporation (abbrev. PDC) is a state-owned economic development corporation in the Malaysian state of Penang. Established in 1969, it serves as the primary development agency of Penang, responsible for planning and implementing development within the state. As a statutory body of the Penang state government, the PDC is chaired by the state's Chief Minister who serves as its chairman, while oversight is provided by the federal Ministry of Economy.

== Background ==
Following Malaya's independence in 1957, the status of George Town – Penang's capital city – as a free port gradually came under jeopardy. Maritime trade shrank in the years after independence, as neighbouring countries Burma, Indonesia and Thailand developed their port infrastructure. The Malayan federal government concurrently shifted its focus towards the development of Kuala Lumpur and the nearby Port Klang. The decline in trade volume was also exacerbated by the Indonesia–Malaysia confrontation.

To reverse the economic decline, the Penang state government, which was under the control of the Alliance at the time, attempted import substitution industrialisation. New industries were established in mainland Seberang Perai, but most of these industries failed within a few years. By the late 1960s, Penang's per capital income was 12% lower than the national average, while unemployment rose to 9%. This triggered unrest and strikes among the population.

== History ==
In 1969, George Town's free port status was revoked by the federal government. In the state election that year, opposition party Gerakan, led by Lim Chong Eu, succeeded in seizing power from the Alliance, due to public discontent with the loss of George Town's free port status, worsening unemployment and brain drain.

While the Alliance retained federal power following the concurrent general election, subsequent sectarian violence in Kuala Lumpur led newly appointed Chief Minister Lim to conclude that Penang's economic prospects as an opposition-ruled state would be compromised by ethnic strife and a federally-controlled bureaucracy. Penang's state and local governments faced legal constraints in reversing the economic decline, and it was felt that a statutory body, autonomous of federal control, would be more effective in facilitating economic development.

On 17 November that year, the PDC was formed as a state economic development corporation under Lim's direction. A state enactment was proposed with oversight from the National Operations Council. In 1971, the PDC was incorporated with the passing of the Penang Development Corporation (PDC) Enactment by the Penang State Legislative Assembly. The enactment placed the PDC under the supervision of the federal Ministry of Economy and outlined its governance structure, which included a chairman, the State Secretary, the State Financial Officer, up to six additional appointees and three federal representatives appointed by the Minister of Finance. During his tenure, Lim built up ties with Malaysian Prime Minister Abdul Razak Hussein, and sought improved relations between the PDC and federal agencies to facilitate ease of investments.

Among the immediate priorities of the PDC was the urban regeneration of George Town, which, by 1969 was plagued by traffic congestion and overcrowding. Four Comprehensive Development Areas (CDAs) were designated: Chow Thye and Kedah roads, Macallum Street Ghaut and a proposed "Penang New Urban Centre" – which has since been renamed Komtar. The Central Area Planning Unit (CAPU) was formed, with the proposed urban centre identified as one of its key projects.

Concurrently, Robert R. Nathan Associates was commissioned to develop a master plan aimed at reversing Penang's economic decline. The resulting Nathan Report of 1970 advocated an export-led growth strategy, increased integration with the global economy and a shift in development focus toward manufacturing. This report became a foundation for Penang's subsequent economic transformation. As Penang's "principal development agency", the PDC was entrusted with broad autonomy in development, including the establishment of free industrial zones (FIZs) at Bayan Lepas and Perai, the development of commercial and residential areas, tourism, and land reclamation.

== Real estate development ==
=== Industrial ===
While the Nathan Report cited infrastructure and a "young work force" as key components of Penang's industrial potential, it acknowledged the challenges posed by the state's limited land bank. Additionally, the report noted that the centralisation of power in the hands of the federal government hampered the Penang state government's ability to generate revenue. The state government circumvented this by transferring all assets and government land to the PDC for industrial development. State authorities, through the PDC, also implemented a proactive approach to foster partnerships with the private sector.

Bayan Lepas, where the Penang International Airport is located, was earmarked for electronics manufacturing, while Perai was designated for heavier industries. Following the enactment of the Free Trade Zone Act in 1971 by the federal Parliament, the Bayan Lepas Free Industrial Zone (Bayan Lepas FIZ), Malaysia's first free industrial zone, was created in 1972. The PDC facilitated land clearing and the provision of infrastructure at below-market rates, while the Free Trade Zone Act granted tax and duty exemptions to companies operating within the Bayan Lepas FIZ. The Perai Free Industrial Zone (Perai FIZ) was subsequently established in 1980. The PDC has since facilitated the expansion of Penang's manufacturing sector, overseeing a total of 11 industrial parks throughout the state as of 2024.

=== Residential ===
To address overcrowding within downtown George Town, the PDC initiated a large-scale housing program aimed at resettling the urban population. To replace the kampongs, terraced shophouses and walk-up flats of the existing cityscape, inexpensive European-style apartment blocks were rapidly built to house the urban population.

The Macallum Street Ghaut flats, one of the four CDAs within downtown George Town, were the first public housing project undertaken by the PDC. A total of 20.2 hectares (50 acres) of land were reclaimed off Macallum Street. By 1985, three 22-storey blocks and two 12-storey blocks, providing a total of 1,469 residential units, were completed for residents displaced by the nearby Komtar project. By 1990, low-cost flats containing 381 residential units were also constructed at Kedah Road.

=== Urban planning ===
The proposed "Penang New Urban Centre" covered an area of 11 hectares (27 acres) at the intersection of Beach Street, Penang, Prangin and Magazine roads. The proposal comprised an office tower and a podium shopping mall. Much of the land was owned by the George Town City Council and the Penang state government, while the remainder was acquired by the PDC from Peranakan Chinese landlords. The project was publicly announced in 1970 as part of CAPU's key initiatives. The city council appointed Architects Team Three (AT3), led by Lim Chong Keat, the brother of Chief Minister Lim Chong Eu, to oversee the project.

The PDC commenced the implementation of the proposed urban centre in 1972, after obtaining political approval in the previous year. Construction of the complex, which was subsequently renamed Komtar, began in 1974. Upon its completion in 1985, Komtar Tower was the tallest skyscraper in Southeast Asia. While originally envisioned as the largest urban regeneration project in Malaysian history, the construction of Komtar became controversial due to the destruction of streets and shophouses, which contributed to the hollowing out of downtown George Town.

The Nathan Report recommended the expansion of George Town southwards towards Bayan Lepas, through the development of previously agricultural areas in southern Penang Island. To support the Bayan Lepas FIZ, the PDC constructed the new township of Bayan Baru, which included residential and commercial properties. Bayan Baru was declared open in 1975 by then Governor Sardon Jubir. By 1989, Bayan Baru contained about 6,600 residential units, accommodating an estimated population of 33,000, while plans for commercial facilities and a sports centre, later named Setia SPICE, were also in progress.

In Seberang Perai, the township of Seberang Jaya was officially inaugurated by Prime Minister Abdul Razak in 1976. Similar to the planning of Bayan Baru, Seberang Jaya was developed to support the Perai FIZ. By 1990, the township contained about 5,000 residential units, accommodating an estimated population of 24,500. Concurrently, Batu Kawan to the south was identified as a new industrial hub, which led to the establishment of Bandar Cassia as the PDC's third township after Bayan Baru and Seberang Jaya.

== Subsidiaries ==
Name	Function	Ref
PDC Nusabina Sdn Bhd	Contractor Company for Building Construction and Civil Engineering.	
PDC Telecommunication Services Sdn Bhd	Development of telecommunications infrastructure in Penang.	
PDC Setia Urus Sdn Bhd	Urban regeneration and maintenance.	
Solar Voltech Sdn Bhd	Registered Solar PV Investor (RPVI).	
Assets Care Solutions Sdn Bhd	Complementing PDC Setia Urus Sdn Bhd in providing property and facilities management services.	
PDC Properties Sdn Bhd	Property developer.	
PDC Premier Holdings Sdn. Bhd	Property development and property services investment.	

== See also ==
- George Town World Heritage Incorporated
- InvestPenang
- Penang Hill Corporation
- Penang Skills Development Centre
- Penang Water Supply Corporation
