= Macallum Street Ghaut =

Macallum Street Ghaut Gat Lebuh Macallum
- Neighbourhood of George Town
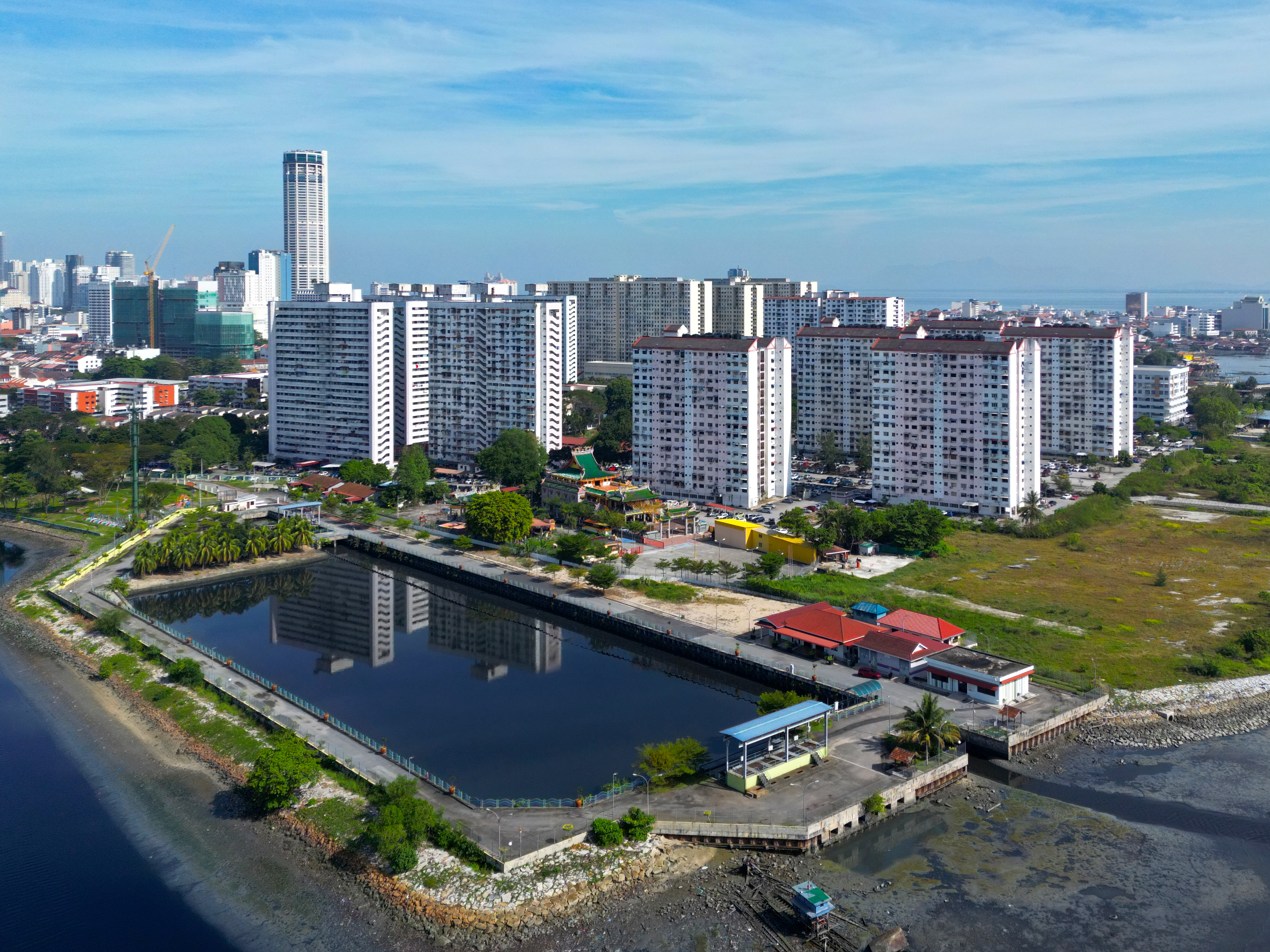
- Interactive map of Macallum Street Ghaut
- Location within George Town in Penang
- Coordinates: 5°24′22.7658″N 100°19′57.5898″E
- Country: Malaysia
- State: Penang
- City: George Town
- District: Northeast
- Founded: 1985
- Time zone: UTC+8 (MST)
  - Summer (DST): Not observed
- Postal code: 10300

Macallum Street Ghaut is a residential neighbourhood within the city of George Town in the Malaysian state of Penang. Situated within the city's central business district, it comprises seven blocks of low-cost public housing built on reclaimed land off Macallum Street, known as the Macallum Street Ghaut flats. The first apartment blocks were completed in 1985, and they remain among the few formalised low-cost housing areas in the vicinity of the city's UNESCO World Heritage Site.

== History ==
In the years following Malaya's independence, the Penang state government expressed interest in developing low-cost public housing. This brought the state government into conflict with the George Town City Council over the provision of affordable housing within the limits of George Town. In 1969, the Penang Development Corporation (PDC) was formed under the direction of newly elected Chief Minister Lim Chong Eu, partly to address the issue of urban overcrowding within the city.

As part of the solution, Macallum Street Ghaut (ghat) was designated one of the four Comprehensive Development Areas (CDA) in the city proper. The PDC planned to reclaim 20.2 hectares (50 acres) off Macallum Street to build inexpensive European-style apartment blocks to house residents displaced by the concurrent Komtar project nearby. The Macallum Street Ghaut flats were the first public housing project undertaken by the PDC, to be followed by similar projects at Kedah Road and Bayan Baru.

By 1985, three 22-storey blocks and two 12-storey blocks containing a total of 1,469 residential units were completed. In total, seven apartment blocks were constructed and remain a major inhabited residential pocket at the periphery of George Town's UNESCO World Heritage Site, in spite of the continuing depopulation of the city centre.

== See also ==
- Rifle Range, Penang
