= Penang Skills Development Centre =

Nonprofit organisation in the Malaysian state of Penang

- Pusat Pembangunan Kemahiran Pulau Pinang
- The logo is a stylised human figure in a circle symbolising the role of PSDC as a centre that use human intelligence in developing skills.

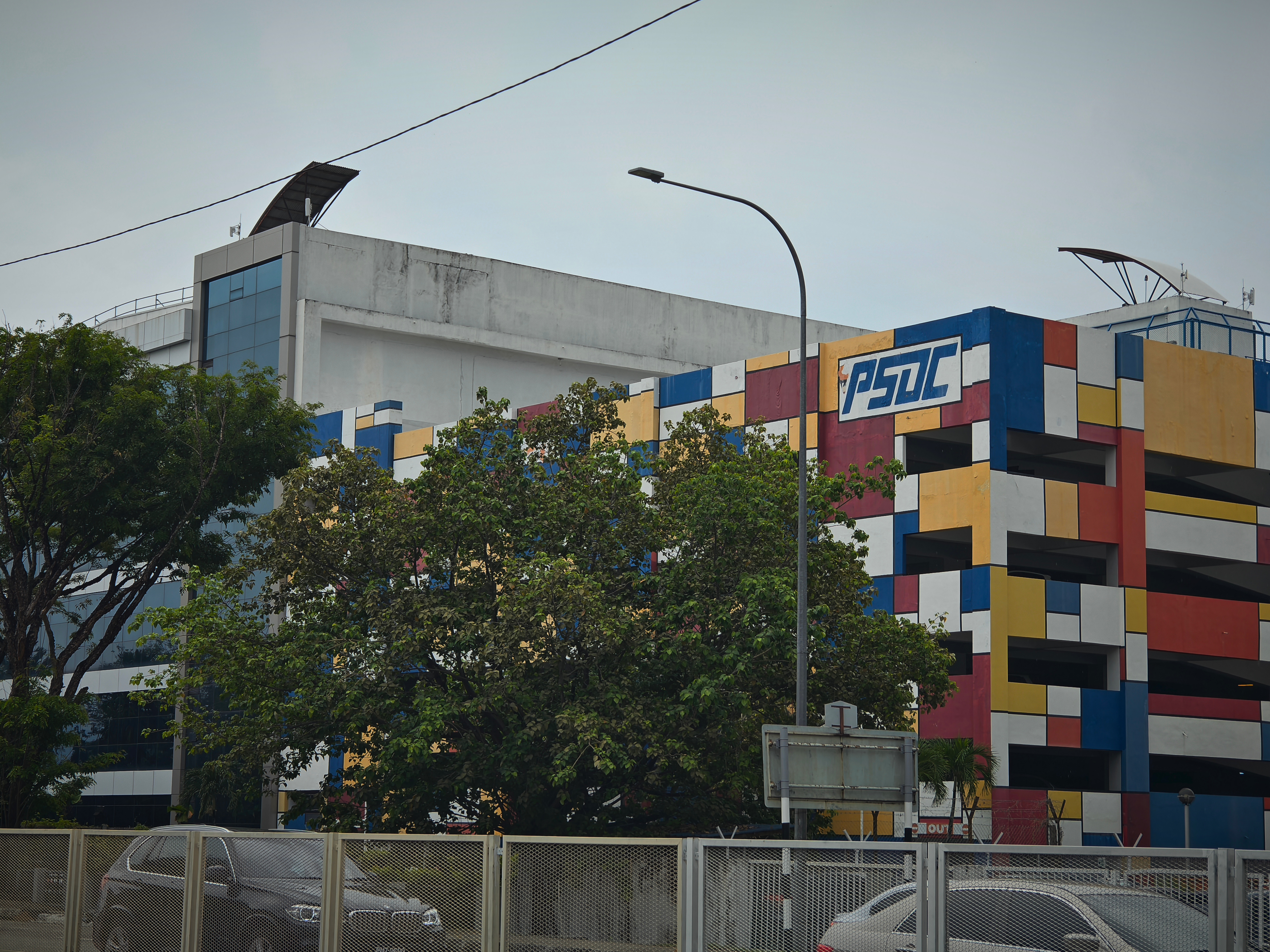
- Headquarters at Bayan Lepas in George Town, Penang as viewed from the left side of Jalan Sultan Azlan Shah.

Agency overview
- Formed: 1989; 37 years ago
- Type: Nonprofit skills training institute
- Jurisdiction: Penang state government
- Headquarters: 1, Jalan Sultan Azlan Shah, Penang Skills Development Centre Building, Bayan Lepas, George Town, Penang, Malaysia
- Agency executives: Solomon A. Lorthu, Chairman; Hari Narayanan, CEO; Lim Wei Chen, COO
- Website: www.psdc.org.my

The Penang Skills Development Centre (abbrev. PSDC) is a nonprofit skills training institute in the Malaysian state of Penang. It was created in 1989 through a public–private partnership involving the Penang state government, the private sector and Universiti Sains Malaysia. PSDC functions as an industry-led organisation focused on human resource development, catering to both the manufacturing and services sectors in Penang. The institute offers training programs designed by the private sector to align with the human resource needs of the state.

== History ==
Rapid industrialisation in Penang, initiated by the establishment of free industrial zones (FIZs) at Bayan Lepas and Perai between 1972 and 1980, significantly increased the demand for a skilled workforce. State authorities and the private sector recognised that for Penang to retain its attractiveness to investors, the development of its human capital needed to align with technological advancements.

PSDC was formed in 1989 as a result of a public-private partnership involving the Penang state government, Universiti Sains Malaysia and three American multinational companies (MNCs) operating within the state – Intel, Hewlett-Packard and Motorola. Although human resource development is primarily the responsibility of the federal government, PSDC received land and financial support from both the federal and state governments.

PSDC was largely driven by the private sector, with the multinational companies forming a steering committee, and providing access to equipment and trainers. Training programs were developed by the private sector to align with industrial needs. These provided PSDC with a level of autonomy in its decision making and allowed it to adapt its courses to evolving skill requirements. In addition, the federal government offered a 200% tax deduction on training expenses for companies that sent their employees to PSDC. By 2012, PSDC had a membership of about 150 companies and was 80% financed by the private sector.

Between 2007 and 2010, PSDC provided training for over 150,000 individuals to enhance their employment prospects. Its accomplishments have spurred the establishment of similar skills training institutes in other Malaysian states except Perlis and Kelantan, with all of them now affiliated to become the Federation of Malaysian Skills Development Centres (FMSDC).

== Structure ==
The Penang Skills Development Centre Building is located in Phase III of the Bayan Lepas Free Industrial Zone and is divided into three blocks, each with different facilities and purposes. The floor numberings are designated using the North American system rather than the British System, with Level 1 (equivalent to Ground Floor) being the lowest.

- Block 1 – The first and smallest block completed on 15 August 1997 with three storeys, it houses the lobby, administrative offices, counseling, function and meeting rooms, auditorium and rooms designated as Executive Learning Centre.
- Block 2 – The second largest block completed on 4 January 2001 also with three storeys, it houses the canteens, open air seating, exhibition hall, computer laboratories and seminar rooms.
- Block 3 – The largest of the three blocks with five storeys, it houses the engineering workshops and laboratories, company offices (including InvestPenang, Arburg and KUKA), lecture halls and rooms, a print shop, a library, engineering club room, a study and leisure room, parking lot and a rooftop basketball court. This block was completed in two phases, the first on 8 September 2004 and the second on 27 September 2005. Attached to this block is a two-floor-high laboratory dedicated for Radio Frequency (RF) and Electromagnetic Compatibility (EMC) testing completed on 1 July 2010 and owned by SIRIM Berhad's subsidiary SIRIM QAS International since 17 July 2025.

== Initiatives ==
=== FutureTech Academy ===
PSDC's academic arm FutureTech Academy, formerly known as PSDC Academy, was established in 1991 as an in-house training workshop for Precision Machining with focus on manufacturing technology and automation. Pre-employment training only began in 1993, when PSDC became the first training institution to offer the Business and Technology Education Council Higher National Diploma (BTEC HND) course to school leavers in Malaysia. The college not only provides technical and vocational education and training (TVET) to technical school leavers, but also certificate and diploma programmes to school leavers interested in the Electrical and Electronics Engineering Field under its School of Engineering. Additionally, it also introduced German Dual Vocational Training since 2015 in collaboration with 7 German and Local semiconductor companies and Industriemeister in Mechatronics in 2022. Rebranding of the college took place on 20 September 2025 when it obtained its present name and adopting a new logo combining the letters 'F' and 'T' with a distinctive central dot.

=== Penang Global Shared Services Industrial Academy ===
The Penang Global Shared Services Industrial Academy (PGIA) is a collaborative talent development initiative launched by the Penang State Government on 8 November 2022 to bridge the gap between talent supply and industry demand in the Global Business Services (GBS) sector. Led by InvestPenang with support from Malaysia Digital Economy Corporation (MDEC), Penang Skills Development Centre (PSDC), and Penang GBS Focus Group (Penang GFG), it pools resources from government bodies, private industry leaders, and academia to enhance the competency of the digital economy workforce. An improvised version of this initiative called the PGIA 2.0 was launched on 5 June 2025 to accelerate innovation, support industry growth, and drive digital transformation through the use of Artificial Intelligence (AI).

=== Penang Chip Design Academy ===
The Penang Chip Design Academy (PCDA) is a strategic training hub established by the Penang State Government to develop a highly skilled talent pipeline for Malaysia's integrated circuit (IC) design sector. Officially unveiled on 10 July 2025, it is a key component of the "Penang Silicon Design @5km+" initiative, which aims to transform the state into a global leader for front-end semiconductor innovation. The academy's primary goal is to train over 1,000 IC design engineers within five years, focusing on fresh graduates and working professionals through upskilling and reskilling. It is led by the Penang Skills Development Centre (PSDC) in partnership with InvestPenang and major industry players.

== See also ==
- George Town World Heritage Incorporated
- InvestPenang
- Penang Development Corporation
- Penang Hill Corporation
- Penang Water Supply Corporation
