= George Town World Heritage Incorporated =

Conservation organisation in the Malaysian state of Penang

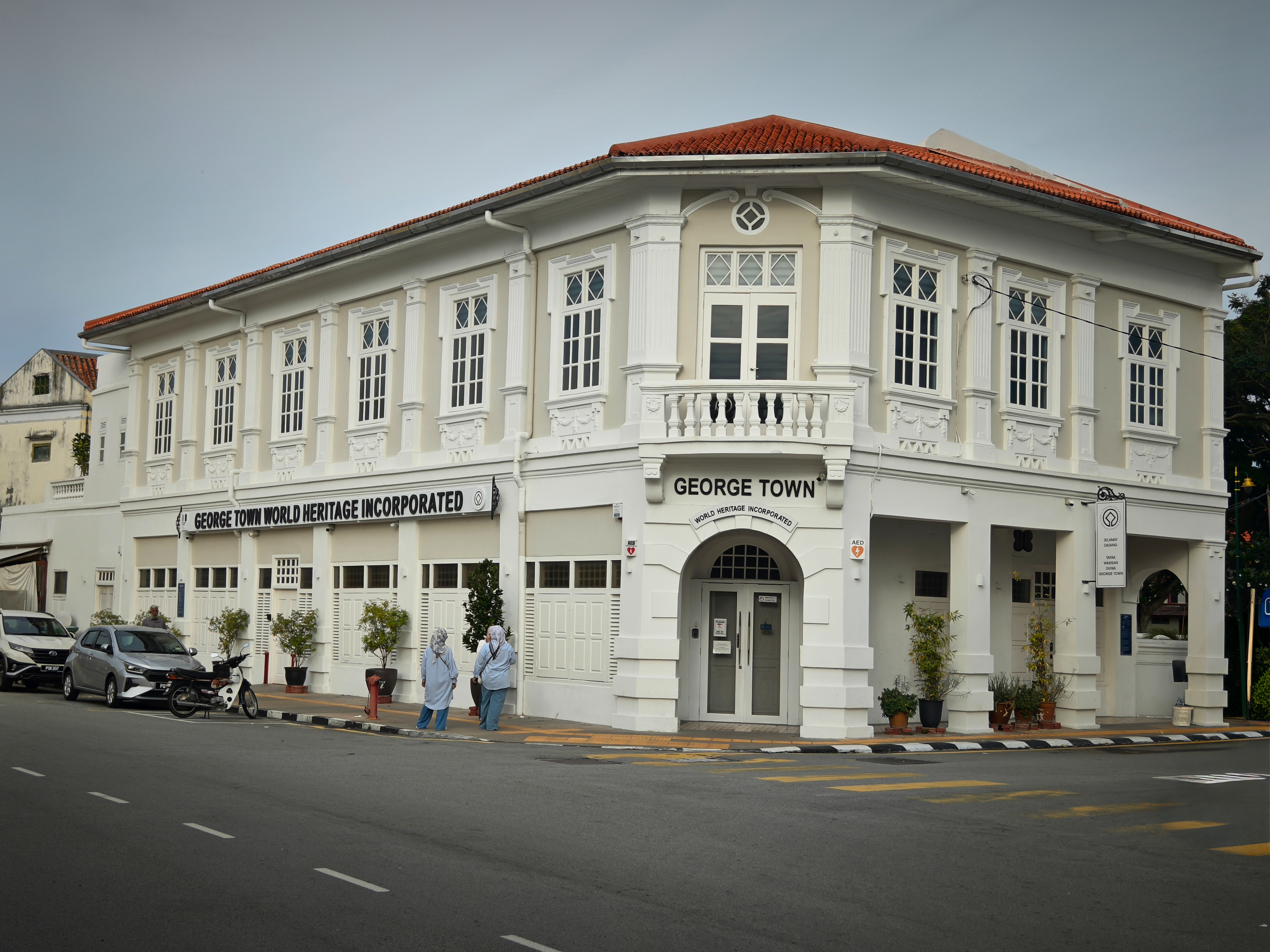
- Headquarters in George Town, Penang
- Company type: State-owned conservation organisation
- Founded: 21 April 2010; 16 years ago
- Headquarters: Acheen Street, George Town, Penang, Malaysia
- Key people: Chow Kon Yeow (Chairman); Ang Ming Chee (General manager)
- Parent: Penang state government
- Website: gtwhi.com.my

George Town World Heritage Incorporated (abbrev. GTWHI) is a state-owned conservation organisation in the Malaysian state of Penang. Established in 2010, it serves as the conservation authority for George Town's World Heritage Site, gazetted by UNESCO since 2008. As a special-purpose vehicle of the Penang state government, GTWHI is chaired by the state's Chief Minister who serves as its chairman.

== Background ==
Heritage conservation within George Town was sparked by haphazard urban planning and a real estate boom in the 1980s, as developers rapidly redeveloped large swathes of the city to build high-rises. The drastic transformation of the cityscape posed a risk to the colonial-era buildings within the city centre. Concurrently, both the federal government and the Penang Island Municipal Council (now Penang Island City Council) demonstrated a lack of political will towards urban renewal and heritage conservation. From 1976 to 1986, a total of 67 monuments across Malaysia were protected under the Antiquities Act 1976, out of which only eight were located in Penang.

In 1991, the Penang state government, under the leadership of Chief Minister Koh Tsu Koon, invited French conservation expert Didier Repellin to assess the potential for Penang to be recognised as a UNESCO World Heritage Site. Renewed state interest in heritage conservation led to the formation of the Penang Heritage Centre in 1996 to train conservation architects and raise public awareness. The centre was staffed by representatives from local non-governmental organisations (NGOs) and worked in collaboration with French experts specialising in reconstruction. Despite the preparation of the necessary documentation, efforts to designate George Town as a World Heritage Site were stymied by the federal government's lack of support for non-Malay cultural heritage.

By the late 1980s, the federal government had submitted nominations to designate Malacca as a World Heritage Site. The nominations were rejected by UNESCO due to the redevelopment of Malacca's original waterfront and the exclusion of the city's Chinese population from the proposed designation. However, the Convention Concerning the Protection of the World Cultural and Natural Heritage, adopted in 1972, encouraged sovereign countries to nominate sites that are "trans-national, integrative and linear." This strengthened the case for a joint nomination of George Town and Malacca as a World Heritage Site, as the multicultural aspects of George Town were perceived as complementary to the predominantly Malay cityscape of Malacca.

Between 1998 and 2007, the Penang and Malacca state governments, along with the federal government and local NGOs, undertook efforts towards a joint nomination. In the nomination, the Penang state government mooted the establishment of a new administrative body to oversee the management of George Town's World Heritage Site. In 2008, George Town and Malacca were inscribed as a World Heritage Site by UNESCO.

The inscription of George Town's World Heritage Site occurred months after the 2008 Penang election, which saw the incumbent Barisan Nasional coalition voted out of power. Pakatan Rakyat (predecessor to the present-day Pakatan Harapan coalition) wrested control of the state's legislature, while Lim Guan Eng succeeded Koh as Chief Minister. Following the inscription, the new state government formed an advisory committee, which included conservationists and developers, to enhance statutory enforcement of conservation plans within the city centre.

== History ==
Lim's administration soon saw the need to set up a special-purpose vehicle, rather than a regular government unit, to administer George Town's World Heritage Site. Local governments were deemed to be ineffective as a result of bureaucratic constraints and a lack of expertise, prompting the creation of this vehicle to circumvent the limitations.

Consequently, the state-run Penang Heritage Centre was transformed into GTWHI in April 2010. GTWHI was established under the Companies Act 1965, with the Chief Minister serving as its chairman. Maimunah Mohd Sharif, who would later become the Mayor of Penang Island, was the organisation's first general manager. The board of directors includes members of the Penang State Executive Council, State Assemblymen of the constituencies within the gazetted zone and the mayor. It received an initial grant of RM1 million in 2010, and is continually funded by both federal and state governments.

Founded without statutory authority, GTWHI retains the flexibility to execute roles beyond those typically associated with the Penang Island City Council. These include enforcing UNESCO conventions, research on heritage conservation, promoting heritage tourism and facilitating public participation in heritage conservation efforts. Between 2011 and 2016, GTWHI, as the de facto site manager, led the development of a Special Area Plan for the World Heritage Site. It additionally organises the annual George Town Festival in partnership with local NGOs, aimed at raising awareness of heritage conservation and advancing the city's arts industry.

== See also ==
- InvestPenang
- Penang Development Corporation
- Penang Hill Corporation
- Penang Skills Development Centre
- Penang Water Supply Corporation
