= Mengkuang Dam =

Dam in Central Seberang Perai, Penang, Malaysia

- Location within Penang
- Official name: Empangan Mengkuang
- Country: Malaysia
- Location: Seberang Perai
- Coordinates: 5°23′38.63″N 100°30′21.53″E
- Construction began: 1982
- Opening date: December 14, 1985
- Owner: Penang state government
- Operator: Penang Water Supply Corporation

Dam and spillways
- Impounds: Mengkuang River
- Height: 24.7 m (81 ft)

Reservoir
- Total capacity: 23,600,000 m^{3} (830,000,000 ft^{3})
- Catchment area: 3.9 km^{2} (1.5 mi^{2})

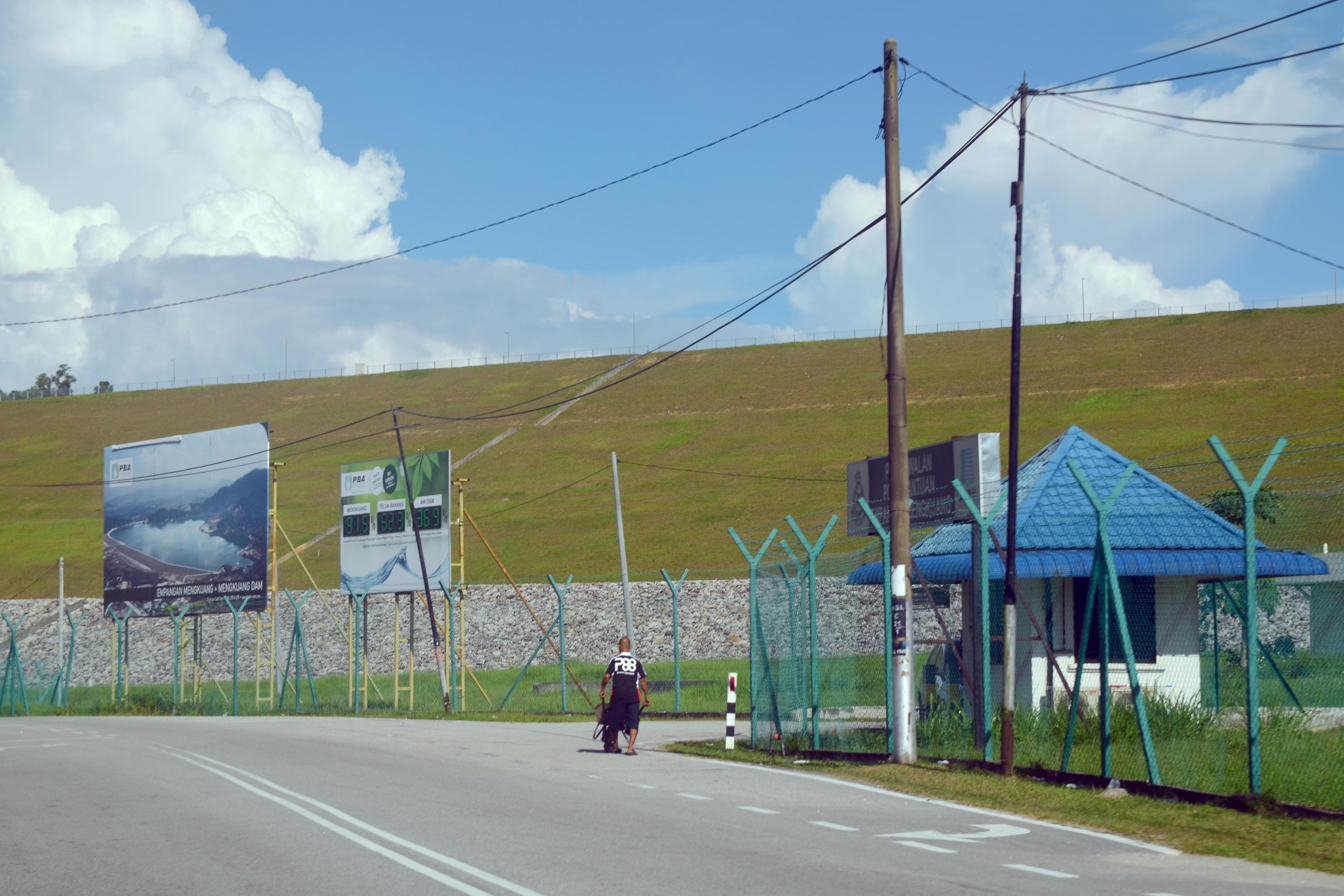
Mengkuang Dam viewed from the north

Mengkuang Dam is a dam in Central Seberang Perai District, Penang, Malaysia. It is the only dam situated in Seberang Perai (Penang Mainland) and the second dam built in Penang after Ayer Itam dam. It was officially opened by the former governor, Dr. Tun Awang bin Hassan in 1985. It has the water catchment area of 3.9 km^{2} (1.5 sq mi) and a gross storage capacity of 23.6 billion litres (5.2×10^{9} imp gal; 6.2×10^{9} US gal), making it the largest dam in Penang, almost 10 times the capacity of the Ayer Itam Dam. Mengkuang Dam closed to the public from August 1, 2011, until July 31, 2016, for enlargement and renovation. The US$200 million enlargement includes increasing the height of the dam by 11 m (36 ft) and its length 1.7 km (1.1 mi) to the west. A new intake and spillway will also be added.

== Recreation ==
The park in the dam area is a popular place for recreation. Mengkuang Dam is also one of the venues for the annual Penang International Dragon Boat Festival. The festival is a fiesta of colour and noise, in which traditionally-built boats race through the waters of this dam, the boats are cheered on by enthusiastic spectators. The race begins with a slow beating of the drums by the helmsmen. The beat increases steadily, going faster and faster, and then rising to a crescendo as the boats cross the finish line. The ornate and painted 'dragons' on the boats' prows add to the gaiety of the festival.

== See also ==
- Ayer Itam Dam
- Teluk Bahang Dam
