= Ayer Itam Dam =

Dam in George Town, Penang, Malaysia

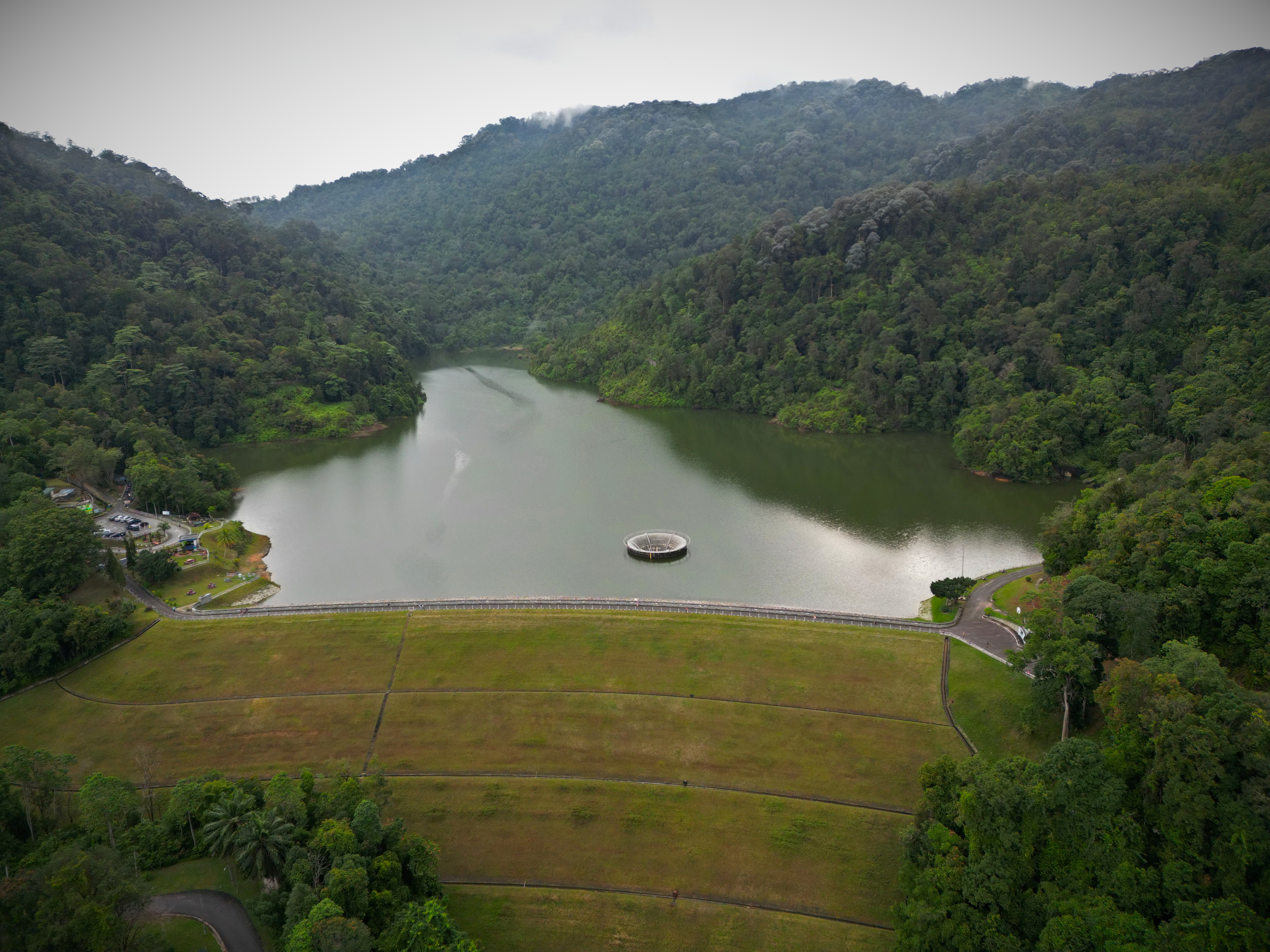

- Location within George Town
- Interactive map of Ayer Itam Dam
- Official name: Empangan Ayer Itam
- Country: Malaysia
- Location: George Town
- Coordinates: 5.3958°N 100.26224°E
- Construction began: 1958
- Opening date: 1962
- Owner: Penang state government
- Operator: Penang Water Supply Corporation

Dam and spillways
- Impounds: Ayer Itam River

Reservoir
- Total capacity: 2,160,000,000 L (76,000,000 ft^{3})
- Catchment area: 30 acres (120,000 m^{2})

Ayer Itam Dam is a dam in George Town within the Malaysian state of Penang. Located 7.6 km (4.7 mi) southwest of the city centre, the dam impounds the Ayer Itam River to the west of Ayer Itam. At the time of its opening in 1962, it was the largest dam in Malaya, with a capacity of 2.16 billion litres (480,000,000 imp gal; 570,000,000 US gal). The dam supplies water to nearby suburbs such as Ayer Itam and Paya Terubong.

== History ==
The dam was designed by engineer Goh Heng Chong in 1951 while he was with the George Town City Council. In the absence of his superior C. A. Collins, Goh initiated substantial planning to address the increasing water consumption in George Town. His proposal for the dam received approval from the partially-elected local government, leading to the commencement of planning for the waterworks.

Sited approximately 770 ft (230 m) above sea level, the dam's reservoir was estimated to cover an area of 30 acres (12 ha) and had a storage capacity of 570,000,000 imp gal (2.6×10^{9} L; 680,000,000 US gal). Upon reaching maximum capacity, surplus water would be directed through an 850 ft (260 m) long overflow tunnel into a spillway shaft that discharges back into the Ayer Itam River. This scheme was deemed necessary due to the increasing water consumption in George Town, which escalated from 300,000 imp gal (1,400,000 L; 360,000 US gal) per day in 1951 to 700,000 imp gal (3,200,000 L; 840,000 US gal) per day in 1957. By 1961, water consumption in George Town reached 750,000 imp gal (3,400,000 L; 900,000 US gal) per day.

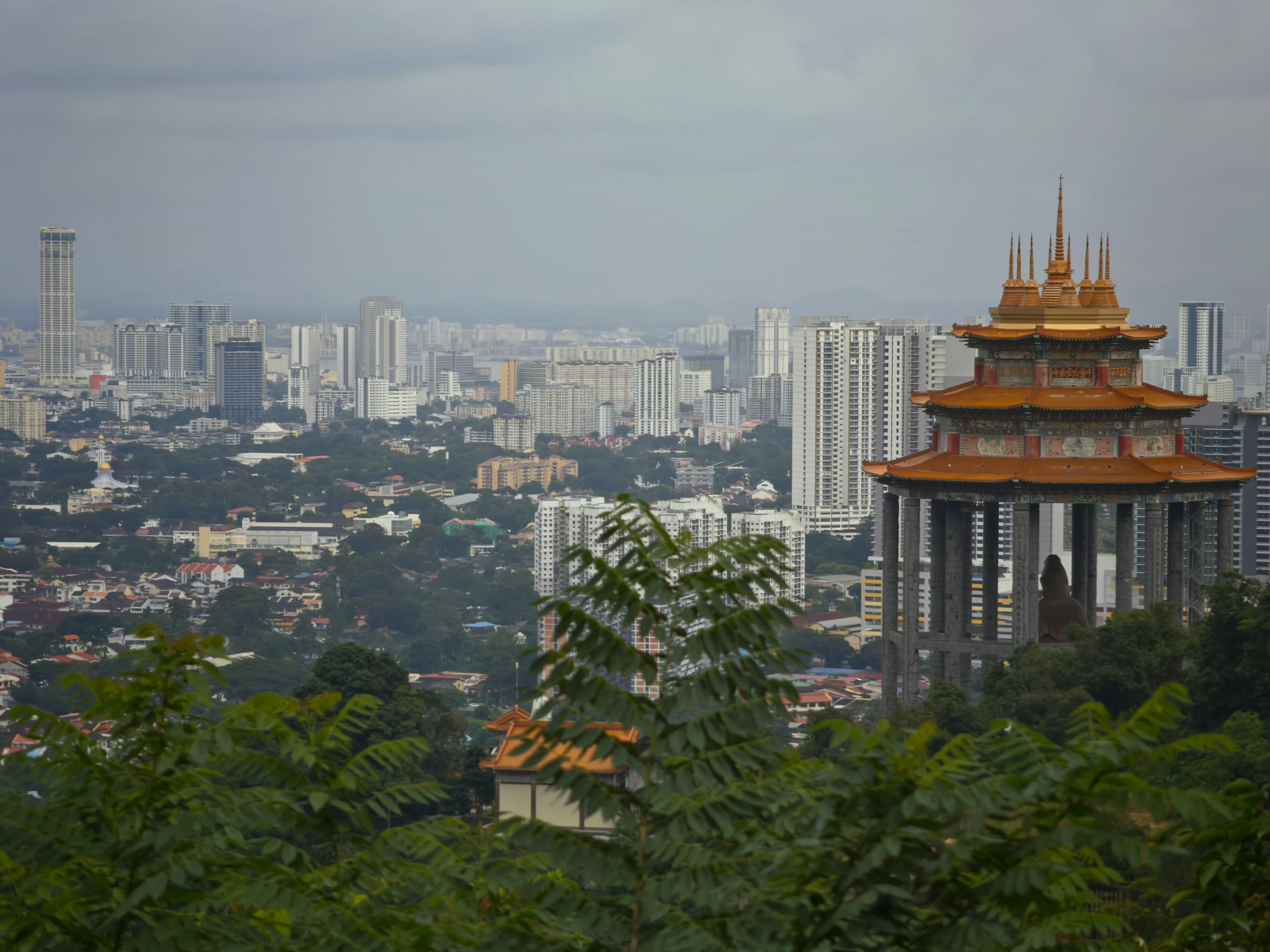
Downtown George Town as seen from the dam's embankment. To the right is a Guanyin pavilion, part of the Kek Lok Si complex.

Construction of the dam began in 1958 with the clearing of primary and secondary jungle, followed by the installation of a diversion tunnel to redirect the river and facilitate excavation of the riverbed. A total of 800,000 yd^{3} (610,000 m^{3}) of granitic soil was used to construct the embankment, which measures 700 ft (210 m) in length and 800 ft (240 m) at its widest point. Additionally, 50,000 yd^{3} (38,000 m^{3}) of concrete were used in the dam's construction. It was reportedly the first earth dam in the world to utilise electronic computers for solving stability equations during its design.

According to The Straits Times, the Ayer Itam Dam was considered the "most ambitious project of its kind ever attempted by the city". The dam cost the George Town City Council an estimated $15.5 million (Malaya and British Borneo dollar), financed through a loan from the Malayan federal government. The dam's construction was later regarded by analysts as a demonstration of the financial strength of the George Town City Council, which was the first and wealthiest city government in newly independent Malaya. At the time, the George Town City Council was led by the Labour Party, while the Alliance Party (predecessor to the present-day Barisan Nasional) controlled both the federal and Penang governments. Despite political differences, the Penang state government, led by Chief Minister Wong Pow Nee, approved the construction of the dam and later announced its commitment to sharing construction costs with the city government. The dam also marked the first instance where a city government was given responsibility for water supply, which constitutionally came under the purview of state governments.

The dam was inaugurated in 1962 by Penang's Governor Raja Uda and Mayor Ooi Thiam Siew; it was described by the Governor as "the biggest of its kind in Malaya, and probably in Southeast Asia". This expanded George Town's water reserves from 8.5 million imperial gallons (39 Ml) per day to 21 million imperial gallons (95 Ml) per day. However, water consumption rose significantly to 17 million imperial gallons (77 Ml) a day by 1964, prompting the need for additional dams. In 1973, the Penang Water Supply Corporation was established to manage water supply infrastructure throughout the state, including the Ayer Itam Dam.

== See also ==
- Mengkuang Dam
- Teluk Bahang Dam
