= Teluk Bahang Dam =

Dam on Penang island, Malaysia

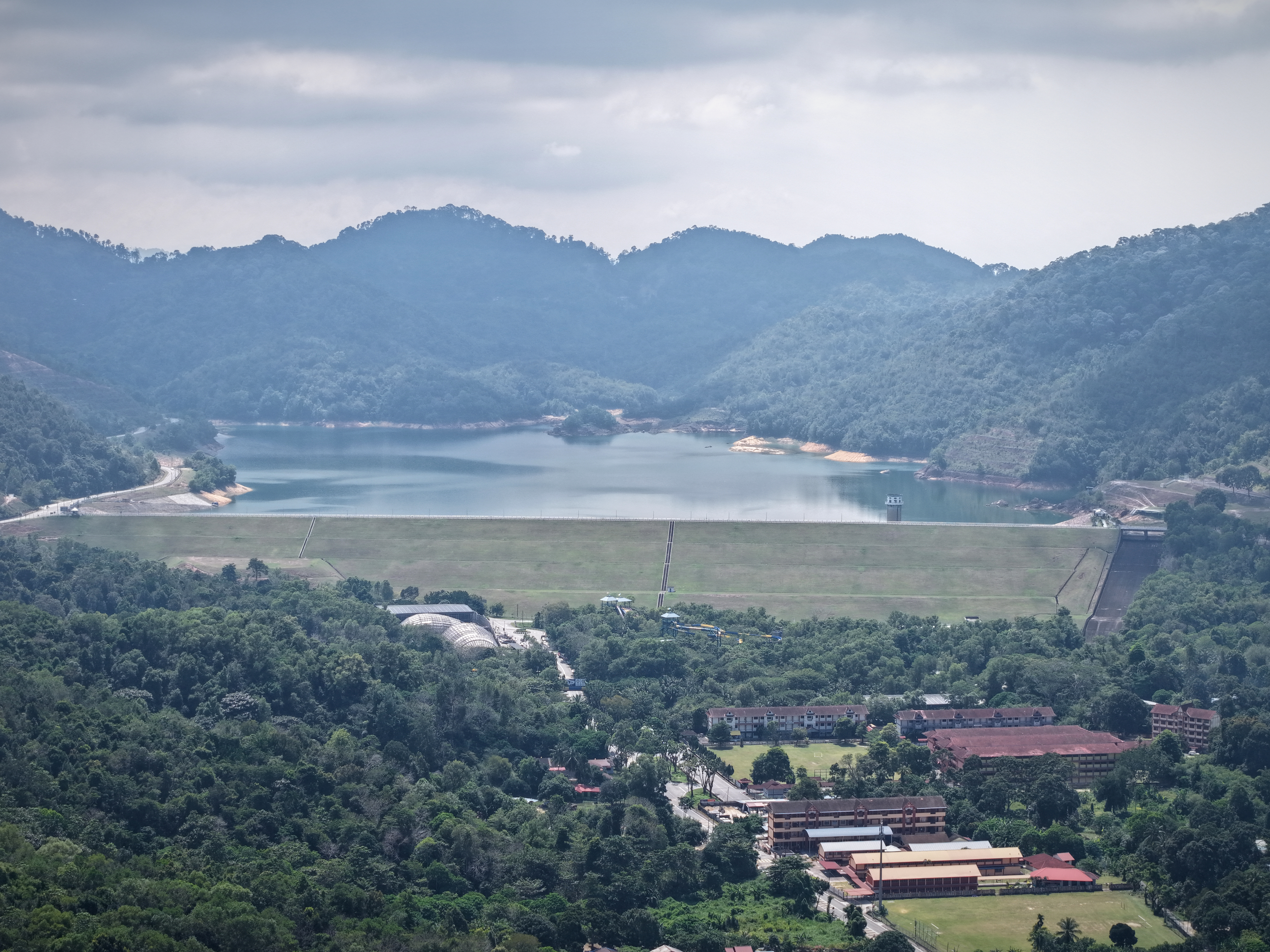

- Location within George Town
- Official name: Empangan Teluk Bahang
- Country: Malaysia
- Location: George Town
- Coordinates: 5.444858°N 100.214269°E
- Construction began: 1996
- Opening date: 1999
- Owner: Penang state government
- Operator: Penang Water Supply Corporation

Reservoir
- Total capacity: 18,240,000,000 L (644,000,000 ft^{3})
- Catchment area: 0.95 km^{2} (230 acres)

Teluk Bahang Dam is a dam in George Town within the Malaysian state of Penang. Located 13.3 km (8.3 mi) northwest of the city centre, the dam is the largest in George Town, with an effective capacity of 18.24 billion litres (4.01×10^{9} imp gal; 4.82×10^{9} US gal). Opened in 1999, it serves as a strategic water reserve during droughts, and supplies water to nearby suburbs such as Teluk Bahang, Batu Ferringhi and Tanjong Bungah.

== Background ==
After World War II, George Town experienced continued population growth, raising concerns about the city's water sufficiency. In response, the George Town City Council initiated efforts to identify new sources of raw water. In 1950, a water intake scheme at Teluk Bahang was formed to be funded through a loan of $3.65 million (Malayan dollar) from the Malayan federal government three years later. The new water intakes proved crucial for George Town, enabling the city to withstand prolonged droughts between 1958 and 1960.

In 1961, during the construction of the Ayer Itam Dam, the city government's engineer Goh Heng Chong announced the need for an additional dam to meet George Town's increasing water consumption. Teluk Bahang was identified as the proposed site for this second dam. Following the completion of the Ayer Itam Dam in 1962, city officials stepped up efforts to finalise the location for the new dam, which was projected to cost $50 million (Malaya and British Borneo dollar). However, due to financial constraints, the project was put on hold by 1964.

== History ==
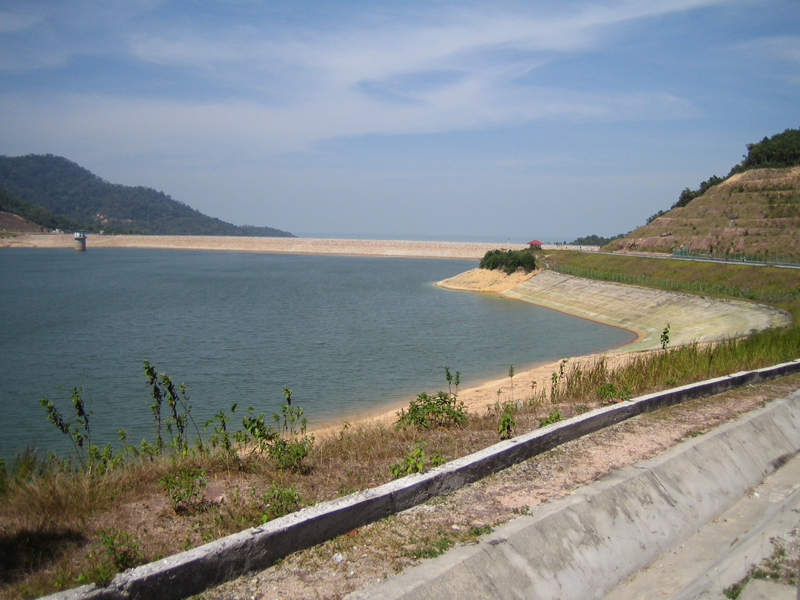
Teluk Bahang Dam c. 2004

In 1992, the Penang state government entered into a memorandum of understanding with the China International Water & Electric Corporation (CWE) for the construction of a M$155 million (ringgit) reservoir at Teluk Bahang. The new dam was engineered to supply 100 million litres (22,000,000 imp gal; 26,000,000 US gal) of water per day, which was approximately equivalent to George Town's daily water consumption during dry weather conditions at that time. The joint venture between the state government and CWE also included the development of pumping stations, pipelines, and a 3.4 km (2.1 mi) tunnel connecting the dam to Batu Ferringhi.

Construction of the Teluk Bahang Dam commenced in 1996. The dam's cost had increased to RM240 million by 1997. The dam was officially inaugurated in 1999 by then Malaysian Deputy Prime Minister Abdullah Ahmad Badawi. It is currently operated by the Penang Water Supply Corporation.

== See also ==
- Mengkuang Dam
