= Seri Teratai =

Official residence of the Chief Minister of Penang

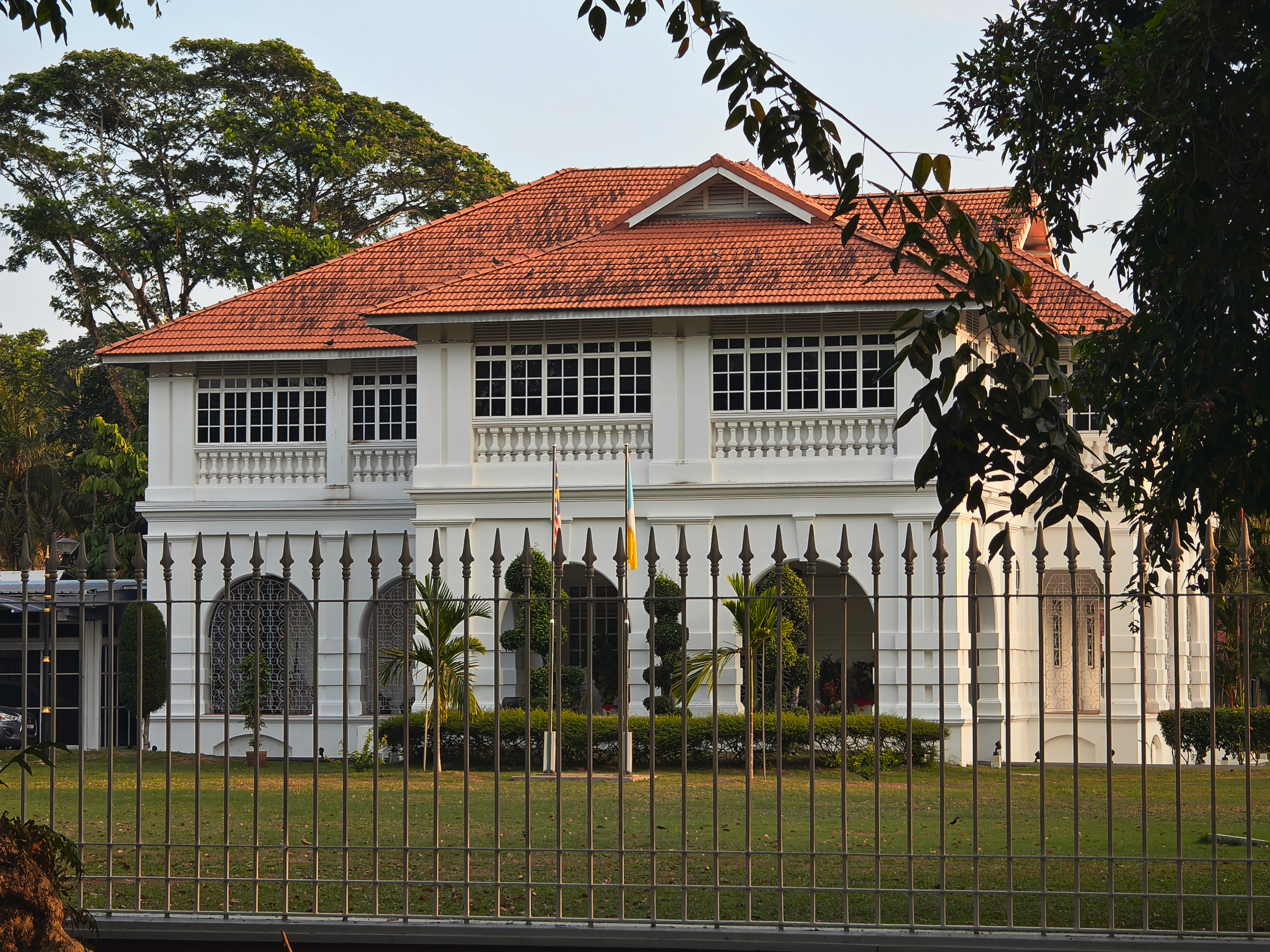
- Interactive map of the Seri Teratai area

General information
- Type: Official residence
- Location: Macalister Road, George Town, Penang, Malaysia, George Town, Malaysia
- Coordinates: 5.423198°N 100.309412°E
- Current tenants: Chief Minister of Penang
- Completed: 1926; 100 years ago
- Owner: Penang state government

Technical details
- Floor area: 8,000 sq ft (740 m^{2})
- Grounds: 114,000 sq ft (10,600 m^{2})

Design and construction
- Architect: Henry Alfred Neubronner

Seri Teratai is the official residence of Penang's head of government, the Chief Minister. Located at Macalister Road within George Town's Central Business District, the mansion was built in 1926. Since Malaya's independence in 1957, Seri Teratai has served as the residence for three of the five Chief Ministers of Penang.

== History ==
The building, originally known as the "State Guest House", was commissioned by Macalister & Co. in 1919 and designed by German-born architect Henry Alfred Neubronner. Situated on a 114,000 sq ft (10,600 m^{2}) site at Macalister Road, it was completed by 1926. The building reflects the prevalent Victorian architecture of the period, featuring an arcade with rustication and keystone detailing on the ground floor, and a Tuscan colonnade on the first floor, which includes single, paired and triplet columns, along with turned balustrades. Rectangular in shape, the 8,000 sq ft (740 m^{2}) mansion has a protruding front entrance that includes a porte-cochère topped with a veranda.

After Malaya's independence in 1957, the mansion was renamed in Malay as Rumah Tetamu. A 15,000 sq ft (1,400 m^{2}) annex was subsequently added, along with two separate structures designated for the house's caretaker and staff. The veranda was also repurposed into a meeting room enclosed by glass windows.

The first Chief Minister of Penang, Wong Pow Nee, resided at the mansion throughout his tenure. His successor, Lim Chong Eu, occupied the mansion for the first ten years of his 21-year term. By this time, the condition of the building had deteriorated. Upon assuming office in 1990, the third Chief Minister Koh Tsu Koon stayed at the building "not even for a day, and not overnight", preferring his own residence for the rest of his tenure.

In the 2008 state election, Pakatan Rakyat (predecessor of the present-day Pakatan Harapan coalition) seized power from the incumbent Barisan Nasional coalition. Newly elected Chief Minister Lim Guan Eng initially expressed reservations about residing at Seri Teratai, citing a desire to conserve state finances. Lim nonetheless stayed at the mansion until 2009, when a termite infestation necessitated his relocation to a rented house at Pinhorn Road, which would later become the subject of a politically motivated corruption case. Throughout the remainder of Lim's tenure, Seri Teratai remained unoccupied but continued to be maintained daily by staff, with regular checks conducted to address the termite issue.

After taking office in 2018, Lim's successor Chow Kon Yeow advocated for the restoration of Seri Teratai and planned to move into the residence, although the assessed repair costs had reached RM1.2 million. In 2019, a six-month renovation project was undertaken, which included upgrades to the interior, fixtures and piping, furniture repairs, and the installation of three layers of termite protection. The total cost of the renovation was RM1.05 million. Chow officially moved into the mansion in July that year.

== See also ==
- Seri Mutiara
- Suffolk House
