= InvestPenang =

Investment promotion agency in the Malaysian state of Penang

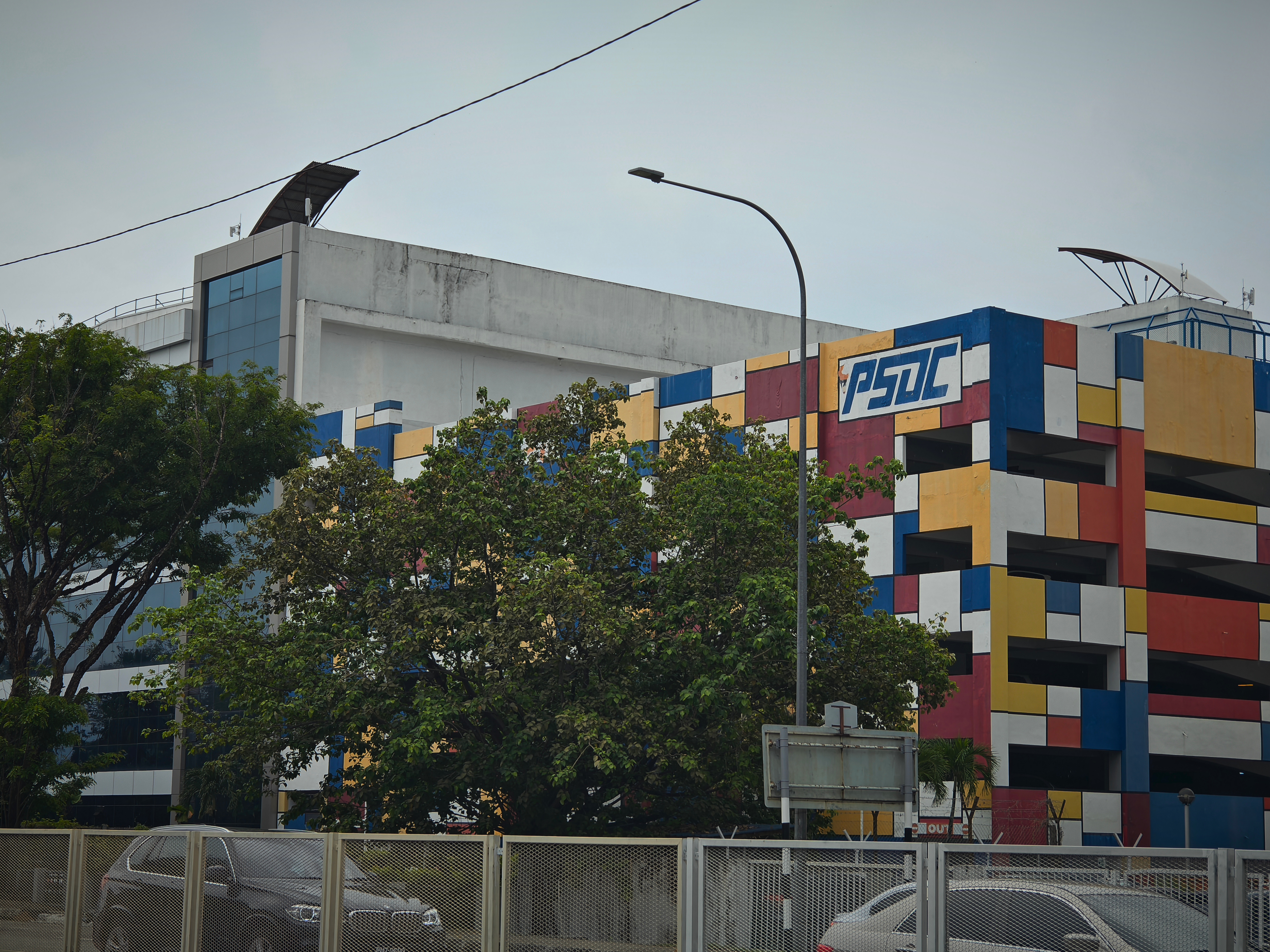
- Headquarters at Bayan Lepas in George Town, Penang. The office is further deep inside the Penang Skills Development Centre Building at first floor (Level 2) of Block 3.

Agency overview
- Formed: 5 November 2004; 21 years ago
- Type: State-owned investment promotion agency
- Jurisdiction: Penang state government
- Headquarters: 1, Jalan Sultan Azlan Shah, Penang Skills Development Centre Building, Bayan Lepas, George Town, Penang, Malaysia
- Agency executive: Loo Lee Lian, CEO
- Website: investpenang.gov.my

InvestPenang is the principal investment promotion agency in the Malaysian state of Penang. Incorporated in 2004 as a subsidiary of the state-owned Penang Development Corporation (PDC), InvestPenang is tasked with supporting businesses in the state through the promotion of inbound investments. It is currently owned by Penang's State Secretary Incorporated (SSI), an investment arm of the Penang state government.

== Functions ==
As the primary investment promotion agency of the Penang state government, InvestPenang jointly manages investor liaison within Penang with the Malaysian Investment Development Authority (MIDA), the federal agency responsible for driving investments into Malaysia. While MIDA and the federal Ministry of Finance oversee fiscal incentives, InvestPenang provides assistance with incorporation processes, serving as an intermediary between the private sector and relevant government bodies.

In collaboration with the PDC, InvestPenang promotes industrial development within Penang through information, complementary policies, fostering business linkages, and supporting small and medium enterprises (SMEs). It maintains a database of local SMEs and actively engages multinational companies to build supply chains with the SMEs. It also administers land for business use and supports the private sector with due diligence. Additionally, InvestPenang's scope extends into the services sector, encompassing areas such as education, medical tourism and hospitality.

== Initiatives ==
=== SMART Penang Centre ===
SMART Penang Centre is an initiative led by InvestPenang aiming at providing market intelligence, business advisory, information, resources, and training services to the state's small and medium entreprises (SMEs).

=== No Objection Letter ===
InvestPenang offers No Objection Letter (NOL) to Companies in Penang that received ‘Interim Manufacturing License Approval’ from MITI / MIDA and wish to apply for official Manufacturing License. A digitalised version of the letter called e-NOL serves as an alternative platform for applicants to submit their applications online.

=== Global Business Services Focus Group (GFG) ===
Global Business Services Focus Group is an initiative led by InvestPenang that aimed at promoting the state as a destination for investments in the digital economy, with focus on the Global Business Services (GBS) sector.

=== Penang Silicon Design @5km+ ===
Penang Silicon Design @5km+” (PSD @5km+) is an initiative led by InvestPenang aiming at driving innovation, accelerating the Artificial Intelligence (AI) revolution and positioning Malaysia as a global force that provide a complete end-to-end solution for the silicon industry. It consists of three key components, namely Penang IC Design & Digital Park, Penang Chip Design Academy and Silicon Research & Incubation Space.

=== Penang Career Assistance and Talent Centre ===
Penang Career Assistance and Talent (CAT) Centre is a focused program set up by the Penang state government under the management of InvestPenang on 4 March 2009 to attract and retain talent in Penang as well as Promoting the state of Penang as an ideal place to work and stay and to add "talent pool" to cater for domestic industrial and service demand.

=== Penang Future Foundation ===
Penang Future Foundation (PFF) is a scholarship program awarded by the Penang State Government and funded by private sectors and donors to outstanding and deserving Malaysians to pursue their undergraduate studies in Malaysia. This initiative, a collaboration between state government, academia and industry, aims to nurture Penang as a talent hub and also to ease the state's brain drain.

=== Penang Automation, Test and Equipment ===
Penang Automation, Test and Equipment is an initiative led by InvestPenang that aimed at accelerating innovation and strengthening the state's Automation, Test and Equipment (ATE) ecosystem, with focus on advanced packaging, integrated device manufacturers (IDMs), electronics manufacturing services (EMS), Medical Technology and semiconductor equipment manufacturing.

== See also ==
- George Town World Heritage Incorporated
- Penang Hill Corporation
- Penang Skills Development Centre
- Penang Water Supply Corporation
