= George Town Festival =

Annual cultural festival in George Town, Penang, Malaysia

- Status: Active
- Genre: Festival
- Date: 10–18 July 2021
- Frequency: Annually
- Venue: George Town, Penang
- Locations: George Town, Penang
- Country: Malaysia
- Inaugurated: 2010
- Founder: Penang State Government
- Attendance: 250,000 (2015)
- Organiser: George Town World Heritage Incorporated
- Website: georgetownfestival.com

The George Town Festival is an annual cultural festival held within the city of George Town in Penang, Malaysia.

Inaugurated in 2010, the festival was initially mooted to celebrate the inscription of George Town as a UNESCO World Heritage Site. It has since grown into a "major Asian arts event", attracting about 250,000 visitors in 2015.

== History ==
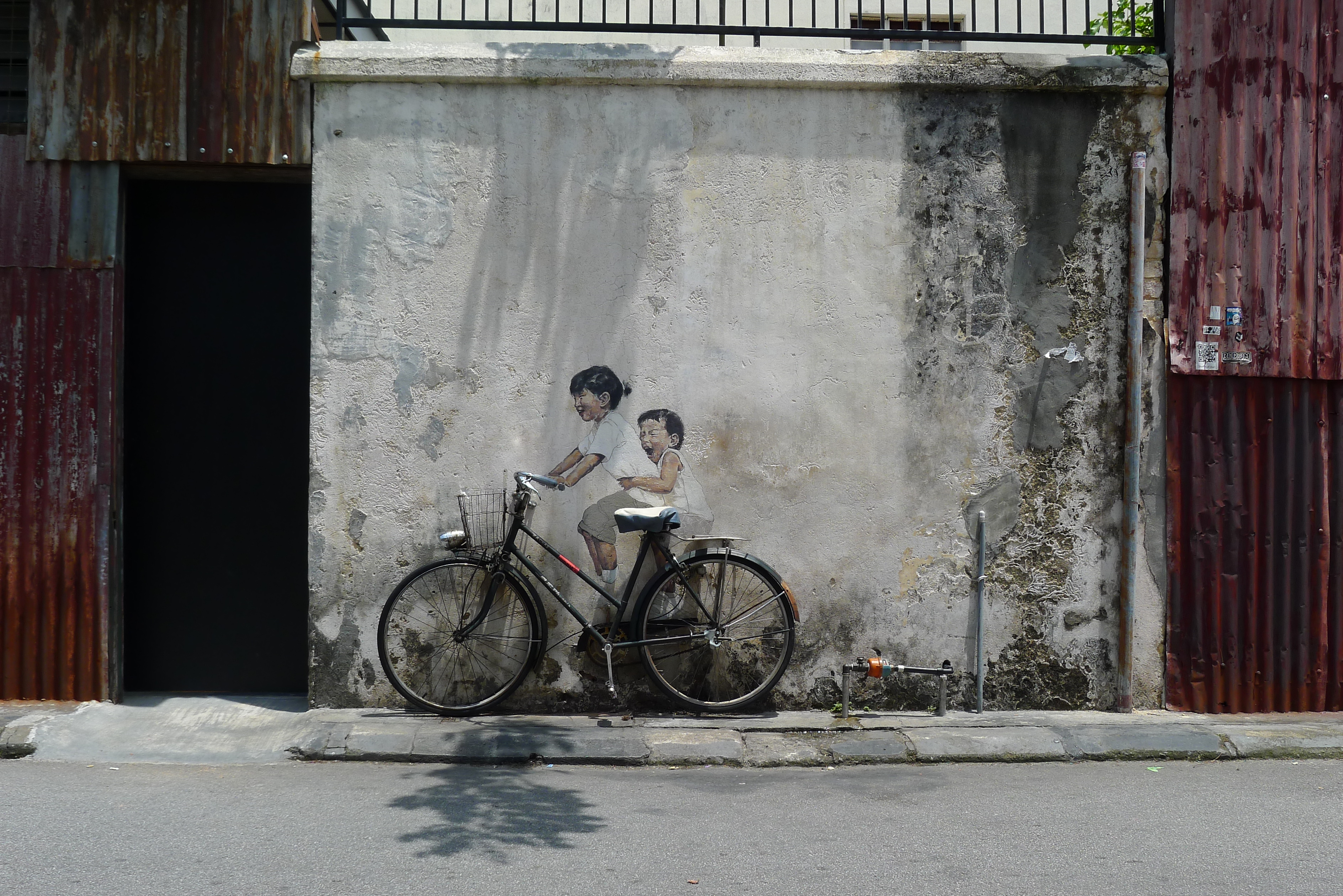
The 2012 edition featured Ernest Zacharevic's famous wall murals, which were drawn throughout George Town, such as the 'Children on a Bicycle' at Armenian Street.

In 2009, George Town World Heritage Incorporated, a state-run organisation tasked with monitoring and promoting the city's heritage, had held a day-long festival to mark the inscription of the historical core of George Town as a UNESCO World Heritage Site in the previous year. Encouraged by the success of that event, a longer, month-long festival was mooted in 2010. Joe Sidek, a well known Malaysian artist, was roped in to manage the festival.

In spite of budgetary constraints, the inaugural event was successfully held throughout the month of July in 2010. The art festival has been organised yearly since then, with events being held by utilising the city's heritage architecture as performance venues. The 2014 edition drew in 218,355 visitors, a figure which rose to 250,000 in the following year.

== Festival program description ==
The George Town Festival is held to celebrate and preserve the local arts, culture and heritage. Artistic performance, including dance, music and theater, as well as photography and heritage exhibitions, have been included in the festival.

Although the month-long art festival is typically headlined by international acts, the majority of the acts are of local origin. In addition, the art festival has become a conduit where regional cultural arts are promoted. For instance, the 2014 edition featured several acts by Singaporean artists highlighting the shared culture between the two fellow Straits Settlements cities, whilst in 2017, the festival was kicked off with an ensemble of musical performances from throughout Southeast Asia.

== 2019 co-production with OzAsia Festival ==
In October 2019, co-commissioned by OzAsia festival and the George Town Festival, a play was created and staged by Malaysian duo TerryandTheCuz, named Light. It explores the personal circumstances first Francis Light and his pivotal role in Penang's modern history and then of William Light in Adelaide. It shows how their lives were influenced by global politics, in particular the rise of the British Empire.
