= Economic development corporation =

Nonprofit organization focused on long-term business attraction

An economic development corporation ("EDC") is an organization common in the United States, usually a 501(c)(3) non-profit, whose mission is to promote economic development within a specific geographical area. These organizations are complementary to Chambers of Commerce. Whereas a Chamber of Commerce promotes the interests of businesses in a particular geographic area, an EDC typically focus on longer-term economic growth by attracting new businesses. Generally, an EDC can be found at the state level to attract business to a particular state. The state level EDC often works closely with local EDCs and may offer low interest loans, grants, tax credits and other economic incentives to attract businesses.

According to Forbes, the USVI’s Economic Development Commission program "was first established in the 1960s, [and] provides a 90% exemption on corporate income tax and 100% on gross receipts and excise taxes—provided that a company employs at least 10 full-time US Virgin Islands residents and invests $100,000 in a local business."

== See also ==
- Development corporation
- Business improvement district
- Pro bono
- Category:Urban development authorities in the United States
