= Teluk Bahang =

- Suburb of George Town
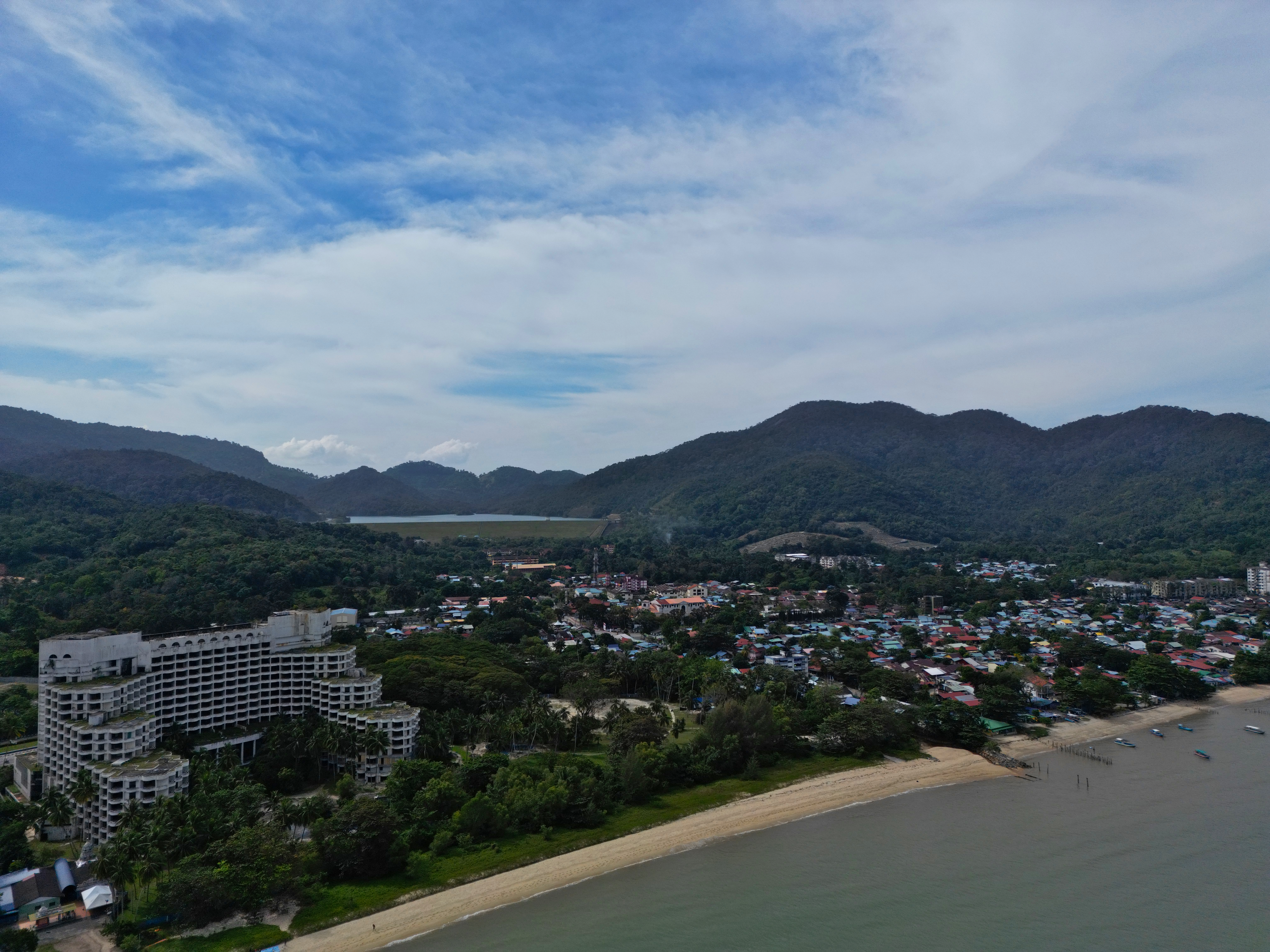

- Location within George Town in Penang
- Coordinates: 5°27′25″N 100°12′45″E
- Country: Malaysia
- State: Penang
- City: George Town
- District: Southwest

Area
  - Total: 20.4 km^{2} (7.9 sq mi)

Population (2020)
  - Total: 2,531
  - Density: 124/km^{2} (321/sq mi)

Demographics
  - Ethnic groups: 85.0% Bumiputera; 84.5% Malay; 0.5% indigenous groups from Sabah and Sarawak; 11.5% Chinese; 1.7% Indian; 0.2% Other ethnicities; 1.7% Non-citizens
- Time zone: UTC+8 (MST)
  - Summer (DST): Not observed
- Postal code: 11050

Teluk Bahang is a suburb of George Town within the Malaysian state of Penang. It is located 13.6 km (8.5 mi) west of the city centre near the northwestern tip of Penang Island. Established as a fishing village, Teluk Bahang has evolved into a tourist destination, with a number of attractions built within the suburb. It is also home to the Teluk Bahang Dam, the largest reservoir in George Town.

Teluk Bahang Forest Reserve is part of Penang Hill Biosphere Reserve, recognised by UNESCO as the third Biosphere Reserve in Malaysia listed in the World Network of Biosphere Reserve (WNBR).

== Etymology ==
Teluk Bahang literally means 'the bay of heat' in Malay. It was named as such due to the high temperature of the incoming sea breeze at the area.

== History ==
Teluk Bahang was founded as an agricultural village, where fishing provided subsistence for the village's residents. In the latter half of the 20th century, the suburb was developed into a tourist destination.

Teluk Bahang was one of the hardest-hit areas during the 2004 Indian Ocean tsunami. As a result, a network of tsunami warning systems has been set up throughout Penang, including at Teluk Bahang.

== Geography ==
Map of Teluk Bahang.
Click link at the top right corner to zoom in.
1 Teluk Bahang Market
2 Teluk Bahang Dam
3 ESCAPE Theme Park
4 Entopia Butterfly Farm
5 Tropical Spice Garden

== Demographics ==
Ethnicities within Teluk Bahang in 2020
Ethnicities / Nationality	Percentage
Malays	84.5%
Other Bumiputeras	0.5%
Chinese	11.5%
Indians	1.7%
Others	0.2%
Non-Malaysians	1.7%

As of 2020, Teluk Bahang was home to a population of 2,531. Malays constituted nearly 85% of the suburb's population, followed by Chinese at close to 12%.

== Transportation ==
Jalan Teluk Bahang is the main thoroughfare within the suburb and forms part of the pan-island Federal Route 6. The road links Teluk Bahang with Balik Pulau to the south and Batu Ferringhi to the east.

Rapid Penang bus routes 101, 102 and 501 include stops within Teluk Bahang, connecting the suburb with various destinations, such as the city centre, the Penang International Airport, Sungai Nibong and Balik Pulau.

The Hop-On Hop-Off bus service, which utilises open-topped double-decker buses, caters mainly for tourists. It includes four stops within Teluk Bahang – the Tropical Spice Garden, Penang National Park, Entopia Butterfly Farm and the Teluk Bahang Forest Eco Park.

== Education ==
Teluk Bahang is served by two primary schools and a high school.

Primary schools

- SK Telok Bahang
- SJK (C) Eok Hua

High school

- SMK Teluk Bahang

== Tourist attractions ==
Teluk Bahang is home to several tourist attractions, which include forest reserves, ecotourism sites and theme parks.

- Penang National Park

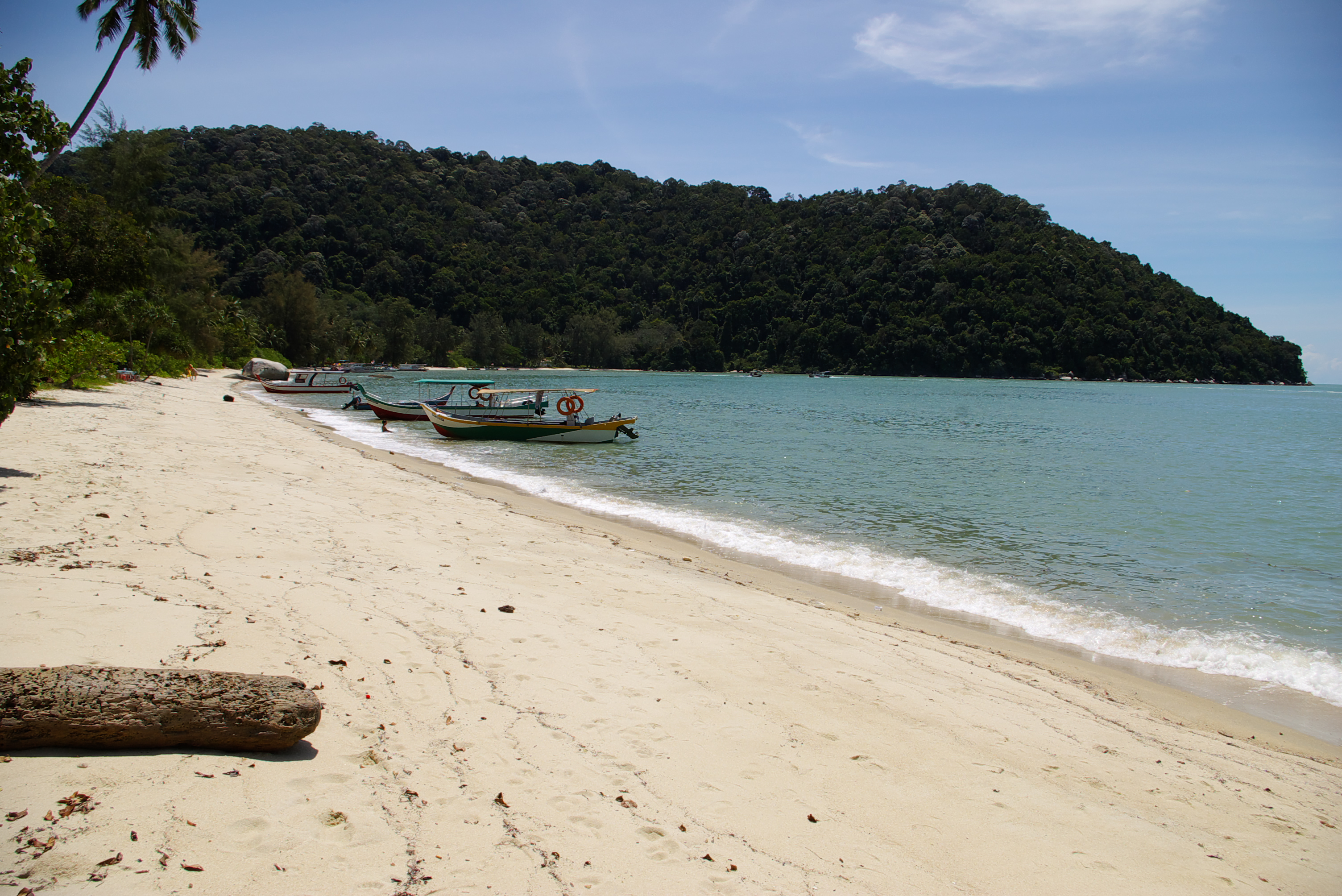
Monkey Beach is one of the handful of beaches within the Penang National Park.

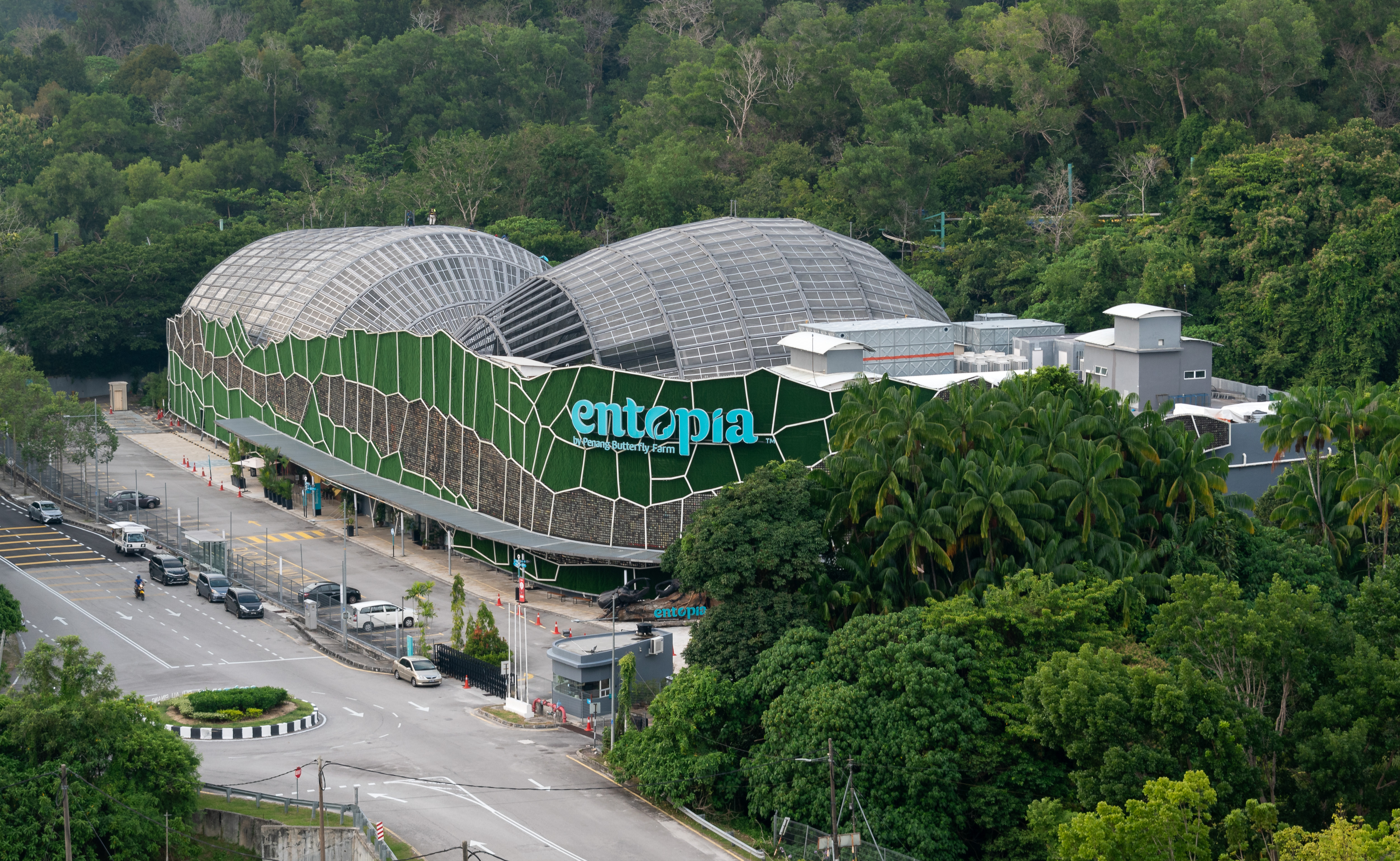
Entopia Butterfly Farm

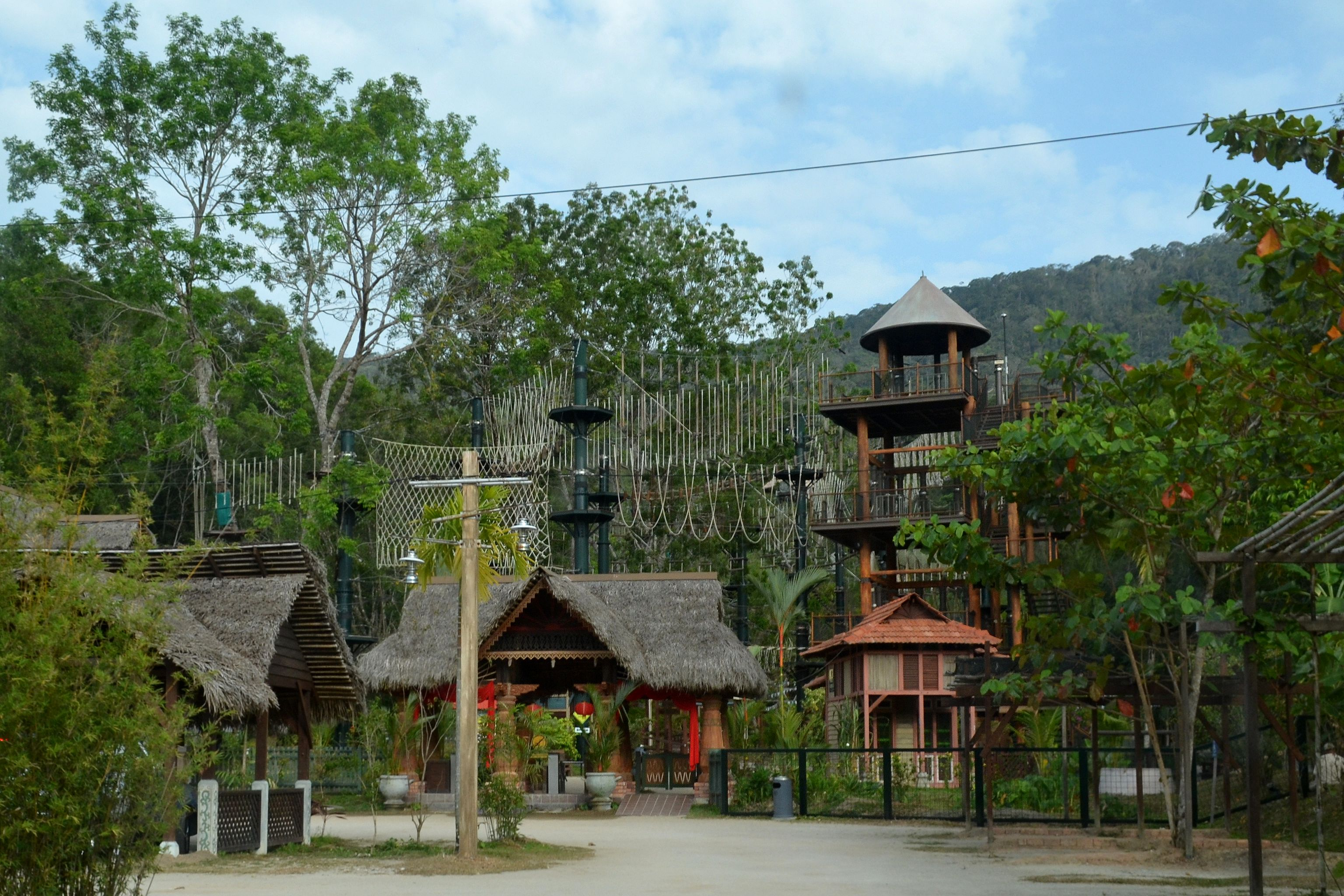
ESCAPE Adventure Play theme park

The Penang National Park, gazetted in 2003, spans 2,562 ha (25,620,000 m^{2}) of the northwestern tip of Penang Island and has incorrectly been called the smallest national park in the world. It encompasses mangrove swamps and rainforest interspersed with hiking trails, as well as beaches such as Monkey Beach and Kerachut Beach. One of the hiking trails leads to the Muka Head Lighthouse, which is situated at the northwestern tip of the island. The forest reserve is home to over 600 species of flora and fauna.

- Tropical Spice Garden

The Tropical Spice Garden was also opened in 2003 and is an 8-acre (32,000 m^{2}) secondary forest consisting of 500 species of floras and faunas. Local varieties of spices can be found within the garden, which includes a culinary school dedicated to the famed local cuisine. This spice repository was also featured in the reality television show The Amazing Race 16.

- Tropical Fruit Farm

The 25-acre (100,000 m^{2}) Tropical Fruit Farm, opened in 1993, contains about 250 types of locally-grown fruits.

- Entopia Butterfly Farm

Established in 1986 as the Penang Butterfly Farm, it was the first butterfly sanctuary in Malaysia. Following an upgrade in 2016, it was renamed as the Entopia Butterfly Farm. This butterfly sanctuary is home to about 13,000 butterflies from 120 different species, including the rare Indian Leafl (Kallima paralekta), the endangered Yellow Bird wing (Troides helena) and Rajah Brooke's Bird wing, as well as small reptiles.

- Teluk Bahang Forest Eco Park

The Teluk Bahang Forest Eco Park, established in 1974, is a recreational area equipped with picnic and camping grounds, and encompasses a handful of waterfalls and a forestry museum.

- ESCAPE Adventure Play

Opened on 8 November 2012, the ESCAPE Adventure Play is an eco-themed amusement park, where visitors can engage in challenging activities and games which include climbing and rope courses.

- ESCAPE Water Play

Launched in 2017 as the aquatic version of the ESCAPE Adventure Play, the ESCAPE Water Play consists of a variety of aquatic attractions and swimming pools, including the world's longest water slide.

== Infrastructure ==
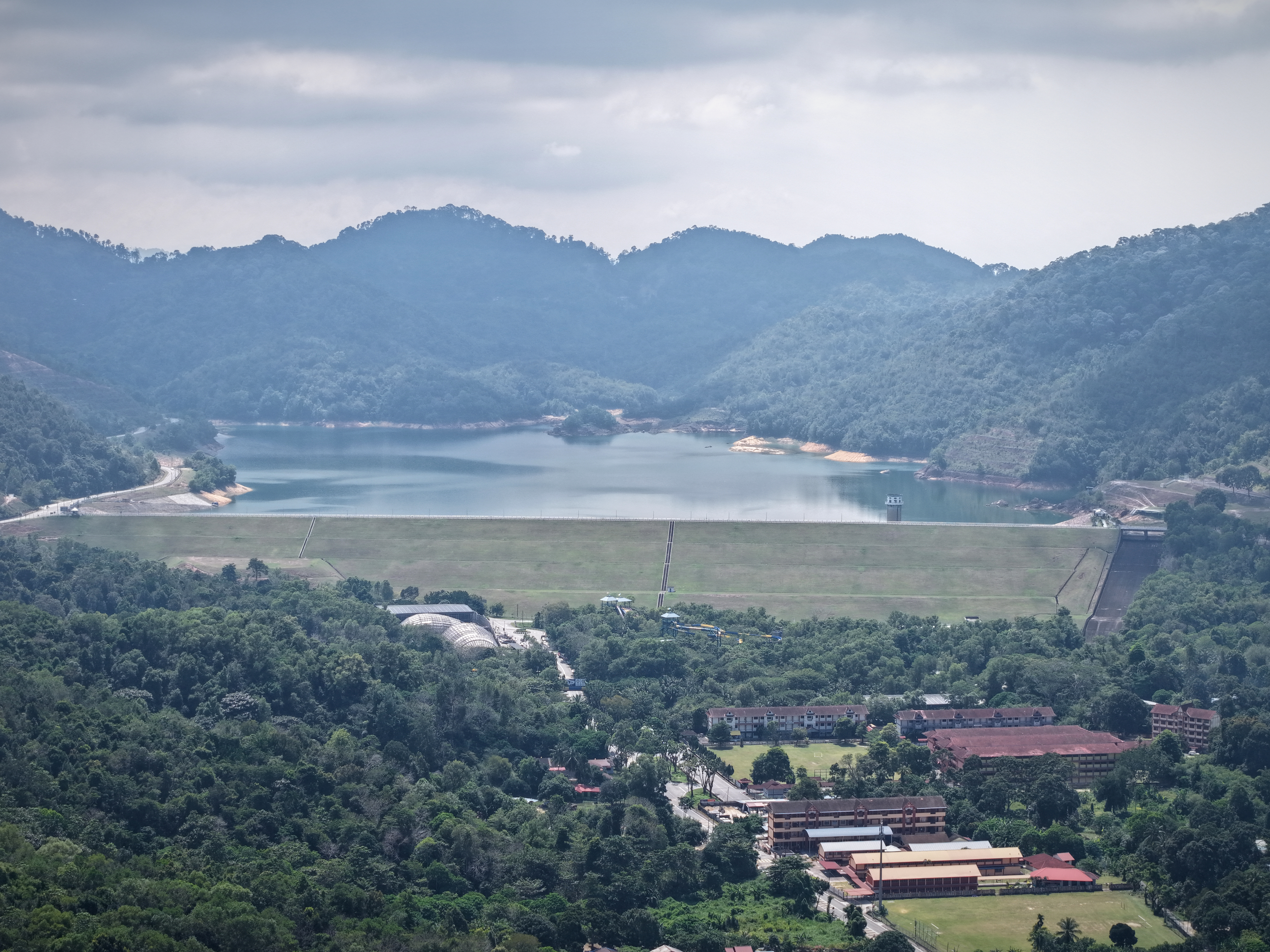
Teluk Bahang Dam is one of the few strategic water reserves in the city of George Town.

Completed in 1999, the Teluk Bahang Dam, the largest reservoir in George Town, is capable of storing 18.24 billion litres of water. It also holds the distinction of being the only dam in Malaysia to be built within a few kilometres from the sea. In addition, the dam functions as a sports venue, as the yearly Penang International Dragon Boat Festival is held within the dam. The dragon boat race, held every December, attracts dozens of local and international teams, such as from Singapore, Hong Kong, China and Thailand.
