= Chief Minister of Penang =

Head of government of the Malaysian state of Penang

- Ketua Menteri Pulau Pinang
- Coat of arms of Penang

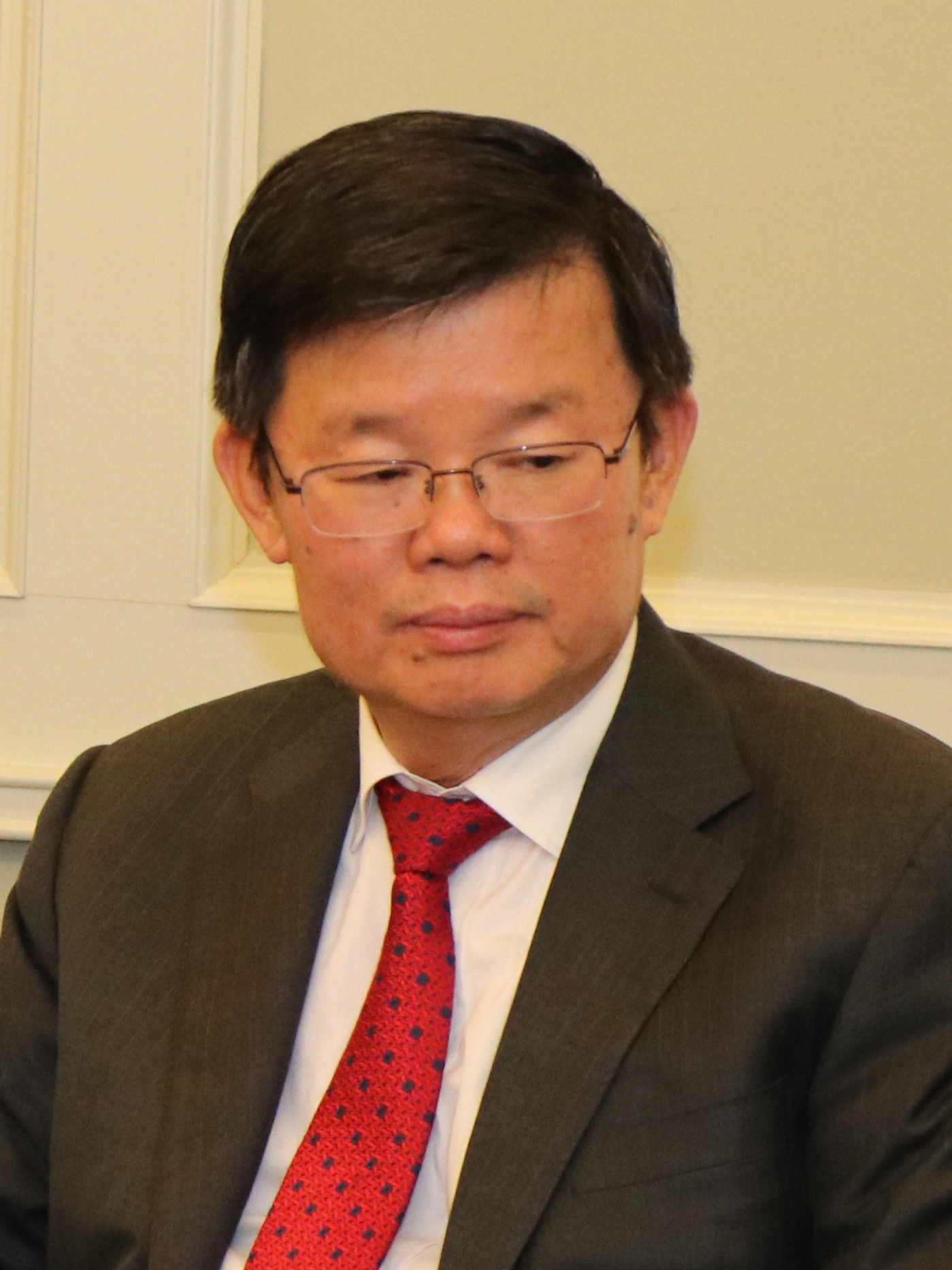
- Incumbent; Chow Kon Yeow since 14 May 2018
- Government of Penang
- Style: Yang Amat Berhormat
- Type: Head of government
- Member of: Penang State Executive Council
- Reports to: Penang State Legislative Assembly
- Residence: Seri Teratai
- Appointer: Yang di-Pertua Negeri
- Term length: Five years, renewable once
- Constituting instrument: Constitution of the State of Penang
- Inaugural holder: Wong Pow Nee
- Formation: 31 August 1957; 69 years ago
- Website: cm.penang.gov.my

The chief minister of Penang is the head of government in the Malaysian state of Penang. According to convention, the chief minister is the leader of the majority party or largest coalition party of the Penang State Legislative Assembly. The chief minister's official residence is Seri Teratai in the capital city of George Town.

The 5th and incumbent chief minister is Chow Kon Yeow, who assumed office on 14 May 2018. Chow succeeds his party colleague, Lim Guan Eng, who had served as the chief minister between 2008 and 2018.

== Appointment ==
According to the state constitution, the Yang di-Pertua Negeri of Penang shall first appoint the chief minister to preside over the Executive Council and requires such chief minister to be a member of the Legislative Assembly who in his judgment is likely to command the confidence of the majority of the members of the Assembly and must not a Malaysian citizen by naturalisation or by registration. The Yang di-Pertua Negeri on the chief minister's advice shall appoint not more than ten nor less than four members from among the members of the Legislative Assembly.

The member of the Executive Council must take and subscribe in the presence of the Yang di-Pertua Negeri the oath of office and allegiance as well as the oath of secrecy before they can exercise the functions of office. The Executive Council shall be collectively responsible to the Legislative Assembly. The members of the Executive Council shall not hold any office of profit and engage in any trade, business or profession that will cause conflict of interest.

If a government cannot get its appropriation (budget) legislation passed by the Legislative Assembly, or the Legislative Assembly passes a vote of "no confidence" in the government, the chief minister is bound by convention to resign immediately. The Yang di-Pertua Negeri's choice of replacement chief minister will be dictated by the circumstances. A member of the Executive Council other than the chief minister shall hold office during the pleasure of the Yang di-Pertua Negeri, unless the appointment of any member of the Executive Council shall have been revoked by the Yang di-Pertua Negeri on the advice of the chief minister but may at any time resign his office.

Following a resignation in other circumstances, defeated in an election or the death of a chief minister, the Yang di-Pertua Negeri will generally appoint as chief minister the person voted by the governing party as their new leader.

== Powers ==
The power of the chief minister is subject to a number of limitations. Chief ministers removed as leader of his or her party, or whose government loses a vote of no confidence in the Legislative Assembly, must advise a state election or resign the office or be dismissed by the Yang di-Pertua Negeri. The defeat of a supply bill (one that concerns the spending of money) or unable to pass important policy-related legislation is seen to require the resignation of the government or dissolution of Legislative Assembly, much like a non-confidence vote, since a government that cannot spend money is hamstrung, also called loss of supply.

The chief minister's party will normally have a majority in the Legislative Assembly and party discipline is exceptionally strong in Penang politics, so passage of the government's legislation through the Legislative Assembly is mostly a formality.

== Caretaker chief minister ==
The legislative assembly unless sooner dissolved by the Yang di-Pertua Negeri with His Excellency's own discretion on the advice of the chief minister shall continue for five years from the date of its first meeting. The state constitution permits a delay of 60 days of general election to be held from the date of dissolution and the legislative assembly shall be summoned to meet on a date not later than 120 days from the date of dissolution. Conventionally, between the dissolution of one legislative assembly and the convening of the next, the chief minister and the executive council remain in office in a caretaker capacity.

== List of chief ministers of Penang ==
The following is the list of chief ministers of Penang since 1957:

Colour key (for political parties):
Alliance Party Gerakan Barisan Nasional Pakatan Rakyat Pakatan Harapan

No.	Portrait	Name (Birth–Death) Constituency	Term of office			Party (Note: This column names only the Chief Minister's party. The state government he heads may be a complex coalition of several parties and independents; those are not listed here.)	Election	Assembly
No.	Portrait	Name (Birth–Death) Constituency	Took office	Left office	Time in office	Party	Election	Assembly
1		Tan Sri; Wong Pow Nee (Note: Wong Pow Nee was formally appointed as first chief minister of Penang on 31 August 1957 since the proclamation of Malaya independence. He was re-elected to Penang State Legislative Assembly and re-appointed as chief minister in 1959 which is on the year Malaya first general election was held.) (1911–2002); MLC for Bukit Mertajam (until 1959); MLA for Bukit Mertajam (from 1959)	31 August 1957	12 May 1969	11 years, 255 days	Alliance (MCA)	–	–
1		Tan Sri; Wong Pow Nee (1911–2002); MLC for Bukit Mertajam (until 1959); MLA for Bukit Mertajam (from 1959)	31 August 1957	12 May 1969	11 years, 255 days	Alliance (MCA)	1959	1st
1		Tan Sri; Wong Pow Nee (1911–2002); MLC for Bukit Mertajam (until 1959); MLA for Bukit Mertajam (from 1959)	31 August 1957	12 May 1969	11 years, 255 days	Alliance (MCA)	1964	2nd
2		Dato' Seri Utama Dr. Lim Chong Eu (1919–2010); MLA for Kota (until 1974); MLA for Padang Kota (from 1974)	12 May 1969	25 October 1990	21 years, 167 days	GERAKAN (Note: When Lim Chong Eu took the oath of office in 1969, Gerakan was under the Opposition at federal level before they joined the Barisan Nasional in 1973.)	1969	3rd
2		Dato' Seri Utama Dr. Lim Chong Eu (1919–2010); MLA for Kota (until 1974); MLA for Padang Kota (from 1974)	12 May 1969	25 October 1990	21 years, 167 days	BN (GERAKAN)	1974	4th
2		Dato' Seri Utama Dr. Lim Chong Eu (1919–2010); MLA for Kota (until 1974); MLA for Padang Kota (from 1974)	12 May 1969	25 October 1990	21 years, 167 days	BN (GERAKAN)	1978	5th
2		Dato' Seri Utama Dr. Lim Chong Eu (1919–2010); MLA for Kota (until 1974); MLA for Padang Kota (from 1974)	12 May 1969	25 October 1990	21 years, 167 days	BN (GERAKAN)	1982	6th
2		Dato' Seri Utama Dr. Lim Chong Eu (1919–2010); MLA for Kota (until 1974); MLA for Padang Kota (from 1974)	12 May 1969	25 October 1990	21 years, 167 days	BN (GERAKAN)	1986	7th
3		Tan Sri Dr. Koh Tsu Koon (born 1949); MLA for Tanjong Bunga	25 October 1990	11 March 2008	17 years, 139 days	BN (GERAKAN)	1990	8th
3		Tan Sri Dr. Koh Tsu Koon (born 1949); MLA for Tanjong Bunga	25 October 1990	11 March 2008	17 years, 139 days	BN (GERAKAN)	1995	9th
3		Tan Sri Dr. Koh Tsu Koon (born 1949); MLA for Tanjong Bunga	25 October 1990	11 March 2008	17 years, 139 days	BN (GERAKAN)	1999	10th
3		Tan Sri Dr. Koh Tsu Koon (born 1949); MLA for Tanjong Bunga	25 October 1990	11 March 2008	17 years, 139 days	BN (GERAKAN)	2004	11th
4		Lim Guan Eng (born 1960); MLA for Air Putih	11 March 2008	14 May 2018	10 years, 65 days	PR (DAP)	2008	12th
4		Lim Guan Eng (born 1960); MLA for Air Putih	11 March 2008	14 May 2018	10 years, 65 days	PR (DAP)	2013	13th
4		Lim Guan Eng (born 1960); MLA for Air Putih	11 March 2008	14 May 2018	10 years, 65 days	PH (DAP)	2013	13th
5		Chow Kon Yeow (born 1957); MLA for Padang Kota	14 May 2018	Incumbent	8 years, 142 days	PH (DAP)	2018	14th
5		Chow Kon Yeow (born 1957); MLA for Padang Kota	14 May 2018	Incumbent	8 years, 142 days	PH (DAP)	2023	15th

== See also ==
- Deputy Chief Minister of Penang
