= Penang Water Supply Corporation =

- Native name: Perbadanan Bekalan Air Pulau Pinang Sdn Bhd (PBAPP)
- Formerly: Penang Water Authority
- Company type: State-owned enterprise
- Industry: Water supply management for Penang
- Founded: 1 March 1999
- Headquarters: KOMTAR; George Town, Penang, Malaysia
- Key people: Chow Kon Yeow, Non-Executive Chairman; Jaseni Maidinsa, Chief Executive Officer
- Parent: PBA Holdings Berhad (100%)
- Website: www.pba.com.my

Penang Water Supply Corporation (Malay: Perbadanan Bekalan Air Pulau Pinang Sdn Bhd; abbreviation PWSC or PBAPP) is a state owned company which is responsible for water supply services in the state of Penang. It replaced Penang Water Authority (PWA) or Pihak Berkuasa Air Pulau Pinang (PBA) following its corporatisation on 1 March 1999 by the state government.

== History ==
Since the British Colonial Era, water supply had been under the responsibility of the municipal and town councils. During the colonial era, several man-made structures were built across the state, many of which were not functioning today or were converted to recreational park. These included an aqueduct in Penang Hill in 1805 to supply water to George Town populace and Bukit Panchor Dam near Nibong Tebal in 1888. In 1894, Waterfall Reservoir was commissioned at the Penang Botanic Gardens to store clean water, because there was insufficient pressure from the 1805 aqueduct system. As George Town population grows, a Reservoir was commissioned in 1914 followed by a water treatment plant in 1929 in Air Itam.

Despite experiencing the second world war in the 1940s, George Town's population growth continued. Concerns about water sufficiency led to the extraction of raw water from new sources, such as at Teluk Bahang, and the construction of reservoirs at Bukit Dumbar with a storage capacity of 8,000,000 imp gal (36,000,000 L; 9,600,000 US gal). Water consumption in the city escalated from 300,000 imp gal (1,400,000 L; 360,000 US gal) per day in 1951 to 700,000 imp gal (3,200,000 L; 840,000 US gal) per day in 1957. By 1961, water consumption in George Town reached 750,000 imp gal (3,400,000 L; 900,000 US gal) per day. Thus, a dam with a capacity of 2.16 billion litre was built in 1958 and commissioned in 1962 in Ayer Itam. This is the first dam on Penang Island as well as the entire Penang State.

In the 1970s, the state government took over the responsibilities from the water supply units of the local governments and inherited their properties following a major restructuring in Malaysian local governance. In 1973, the Penang Water Authority was established as a State Agency for Water Supply. At that time, Phase 1 of the "Muda River Water Scheme" (MRWS) was officially launched in Seberang Perai with an abstract-water guarantee from Muda River in Kedah without conditions or payment. Among the projects of the water scheme were Sungai Dua Water Treatment Plan (with initial maximum capacity of 136 million litres per day) and commissioning of the first Penang Twin Submarine Pipelines (with a maximum capacity of 143 million litres per day) to deliver treated water from Sungai Dua to Penang Island.

== Sports ==
PBAPP FC was a football club owned by Penang Water Supply Corporation.
