= Government of Penang =

Executive and legislative authorities governing the Malaysian state of Penang

Penang state government
- Kerajaan Negeri Pulau Pinang
- State government
- Coat of arms of Penang

Overview
- Established: 31 August 1957; 69 years ago
- State: Penang
- Leader: Chief Minister Chow Kon Yeow
- Appointed by: Governor Ramli Ngah Talib
- Main organ: Penang State Executive Council
- Ministries: 14 departments
- Responsible to: Penang State Legislative Assembly
- Annual budget: RM940.22 million (2025)
- Headquarters: Komtar; 1 Penang Road; George Town
- Website: www.penang.gov.my

The Government of Penang refers to the government authority of the Malaysian state of Penang. The state government adheres to and is created by both the Malaysian federal constitution, the supreme law of Malaysia, and the constitution of Penang, the supreme law in Penang. The government of Penang is based in the state's capital city of George Town.

The state government consists of only two branches - executive and legislative. The Penang State Executive Council forms the executive branch, whilst the Penang State Legislative Assembly is the legislature of the state government. Penang's head of government is the chief minister. The state government does not have a judiciary branch, as Malaysia's judicial system is a federalised system operating uniformly throughout the country.

== Executive ==
=== Head of government ===
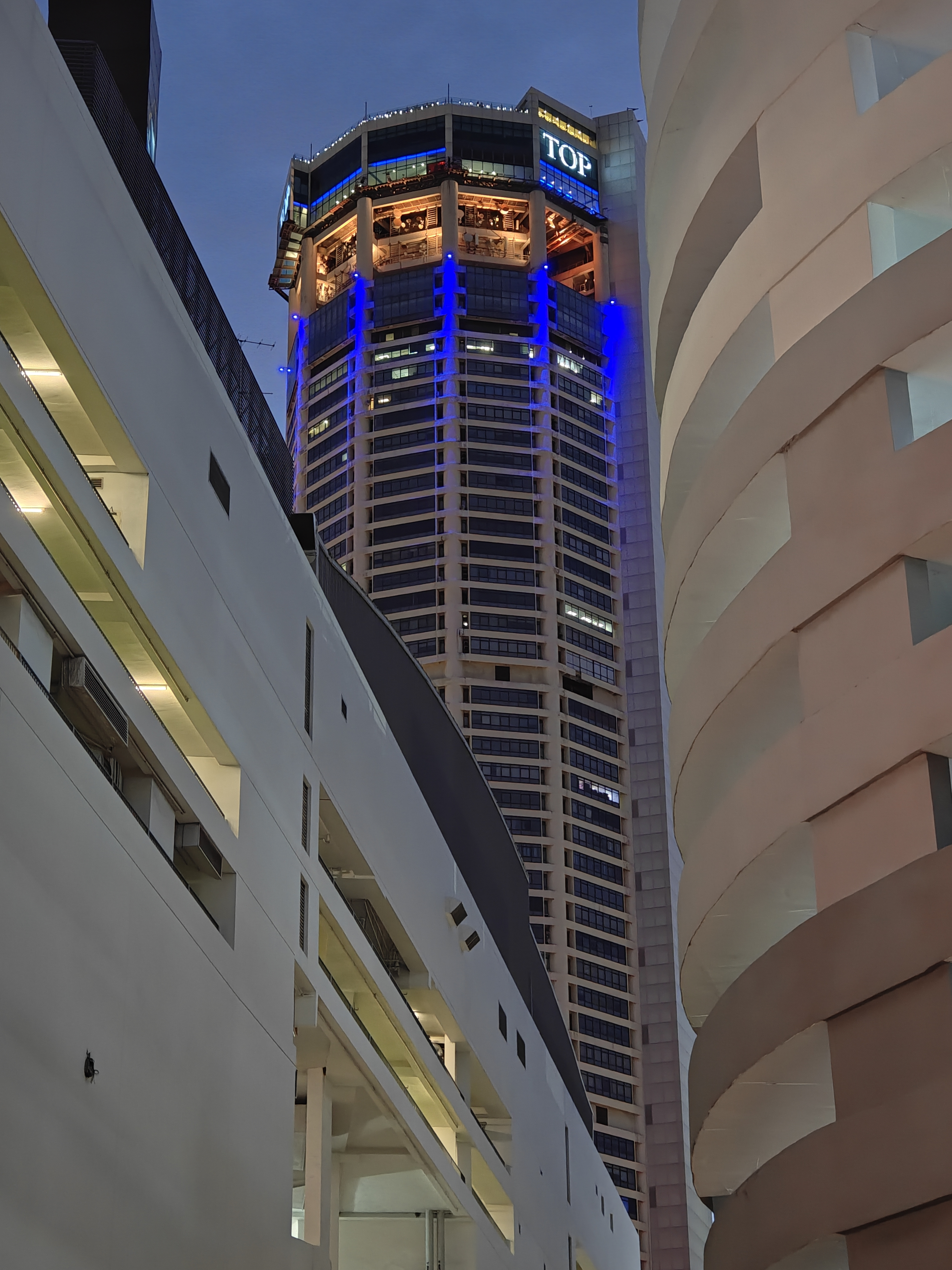
The Komtar Tower houses the Office of the Chief Minister of Penang, as well as other state government offices.

The Chief Minister is the head of government in Penang. He is officially appointed by the Governor, Penang's head of state, on the basis of the latter's judgement that the former commands the confidence of the majority of the State Assemblymen in the Penang State Legislative Assembly. The Chief Minister and his Executive Council shall be collectively responsible to Legislative Assembly. The Office of the Chief Minister is situated inside Komtar in George Town.

The current Chief Minister of Penang is Chow Kon Yeow of the Democratic Action Party (DAP), which controls the most seats in the State Legislative Assembly among the Pakatan Harapan (PH) component parties. Chow was sworn in on 14 May 2018, after the 2018 State Election that saw the PH coalition retaining power in Penang. To this day, Penang remains the only Malaysian state where the position of the head of government has been continuously held by an ethnic Chinese since the nation's independence in 1957.

Notably, Penang is also the only Malaysian state which appoints two Deputy Chief Ministers - one representing the Malay community and the other an ethnic Indian. This serves to shape a top leadership consisting of various backgrounds, representing the diverse ethnicities of the state.

=== Cabinet ===
The Penang State Executive Council forms the executive branch of the Penang state government and is analogous in function to the Malaysian federal Cabinet. The Executive Council comprises the Chief Minister, and between four and 10 other State Assemblymen from the Penang State Legislative Assembly. Aside from these, three other ex officio members of the Executive Council are the State Secretary, the State Legal Adviser and the State Financial Officer.

Members of the Executive Council after the 2023 state election are as follows.

PH (10)	BN (1)
DAP (8); PKR (2)	UMNO (1)

Name	Portfolio	Party	Constituency	Term start	Term end
Chow Kon Yeow MP (Chief Minister)	Finance; Economic Development; Land; Communications	PH (DAP)	Padang Kota	13 August 2023	Incumbent
Mohamad Abdul Hamid (Deputy Chief Minister I)	Islamic Development; Education; National Unity	PH (PKR)	Batu Maung	16 August 2023	Incumbent
Jagdeep Singh Deo (Deputy Chief Minister II)	Human Capital Development; Science and Technology	PH (DAP)	Datok Keramat	16 August 2023	Incumbent
Wong Hon Wai	Tourism; Creative Economy	PH (DAP)	Paya Terubong	16 August 2023	Incumbent
Zairil Khir Johari	Infrastructure; Transport; Digital Development	PH (DAP)	Tanjong Bunga	16 August 2023	Incumbent
Lim Siew Khim	Social Development; Welfare; Non-Islamic Religious Affairs	PH (DAP)	Sungai Pinang	16 August 2023	Incumbent
Daniel Gooi Zi Sen	Youth; Sports; Health	PH (DAP)	Padang Lalang	16 August 2023	Incumbent
Jason H'ng Mooi Lye	Local Government; Town & Country Planning	PH (DAP)	Jawi	16 August 2023	Incumbent
Sundarajoo Somu	Housing; Environment	PH (DAP)	Perai	16 August 2023	Incumbent
Fahmi Zainol	Agrotechnology & Food Security; Cooperative Development	PH (PKR)	Pantai Jerejak	16 August 2023	Incumbent
Rashidi Zinol	Trade and Entrepreneurial Development; Rural Development	BN (UMNO)	Sungai Acheh	16 August 2023	Incumbent

=== Ex officio members ===
The State Secretary, the State Legal Adviser and the State Financial Officer are ex officio members of the Executive Council.

Name	Position	Note
Dato' Dr Jafri Abdul Jalil	State Secretary	
Wan Nor Sakina	State Legal Adviser	
Zabidah Safar	State Financial Officer	

== Legislature ==
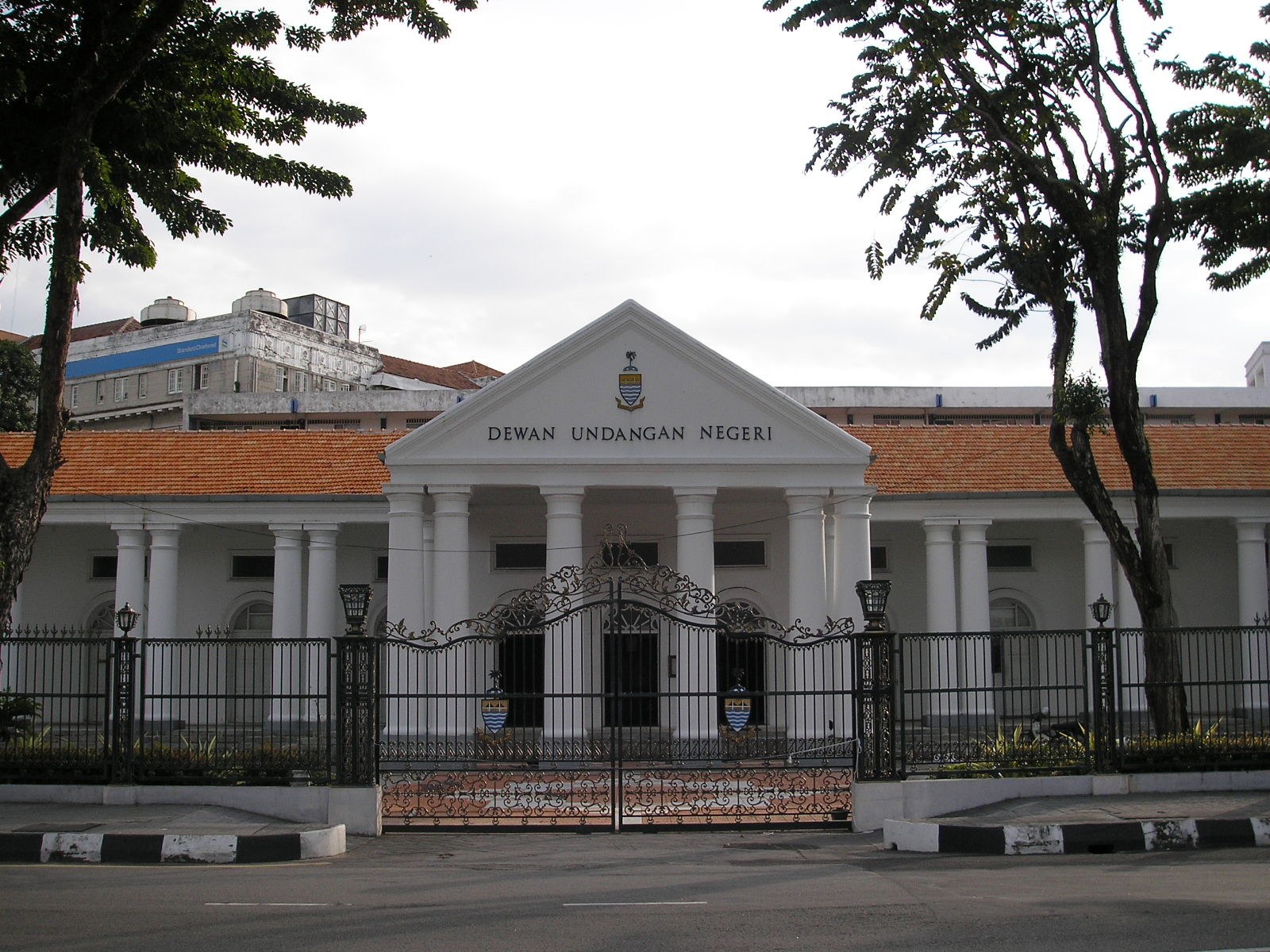
The State Assembly Building

Composition of the Penang State Legislative Assembly after the 2023 state election. Pakatan Harapan (PH) seats Barisan Nasional (BN) seats Perikatan Nasional (PN) seats

The Penang State Legislative Assembly is the legislative branch of the Penang state government. The unicameral legislature consists of 40 seats that represent the 40 state constituencies within Penang, with each constituency being represented by an elected State Assemblyman. The Legislative Assembly convenes at the Penang State Assembly Building in George Town.

The legislature has a maximum mandate of five years by law and follows a multi-party system; the ruling party (or coalition) is elected through a first-past-the-post system. The Governor may dissolve the legislature at any time and usually does so upon the advice of the Chief Minister.

A Speaker is elected by the Legislative Assembly to preside over the proceedings and debates of the legislature. The Speaker may or may not be an elected State Assemblyman; in the case of the latter, the elected Speaker shall become a member of the Legislative Assembly additional to the elected State Assemblymen already in the legislature.

== Penang State Government Secretariat ==
- Office of State Heritage Commissioner
- Disaster Management Unit
- Integrity Unit
- Corporate Communiciation and Innovation
- Internal Audit Unit

=== Development Cluster ===
- State Economic Planning Division
- Local Government Division
- Water Regulatory Division
- Chief Minister Incorporated

=== Management Cluster ===
- Chief Minister Senior Private Secretary
- Human Resources Division
- Penang State Legislative Assembly
- State Information and Communications Technology Division
- Management Service Division
- Penang State Sports Council
- Functions and Protocol Division

== Departments, agencies, statutory bodies and subsidiaries ==
=== Departments ===
- Penang State Treasury Department
- Penang State Mufti Department
- Penang State Syariah Judiciary Department
- Penang Syariah Prosecution Department
- Office of Lands and Mines Penang
- Penang Town and Country Planning Department (PLANMalaysia Pulau Pinang)
- Penang Islamic Religious Affairs Department
- Penang Irrigation and Drainage Department
- Penang Public Works Department
- Penang Social Welfare Department
- Penang State Agriculture Department
- Penang Veterinary Services Department
- Penang State Forestry Department
- Penang Botanic Gardens Department

=== Agencies ===
- George Town World Heritage Incorporated
- InvestPenang
- Penang Public Library Corporation
- Penang State Museum Board
- Penang State Islamic Religious Council
- Penang Youth Development Corporation
- Penang Islamic Foundation

=== Statutory bodies ===
- Penang Development Corporation
- Penang Global Tourism
- Penang Green Council
- Penang Hill Corporation
- Penang Hindu Endowment Board
- Penang International Halal Hub
- Penang Water Supply Corporation (Subsidiary of PBA Holdings Berhad)
- Penang State Housing Board

=== Subsidiaries ===
- Penang Development Corporation
  - PDC Nusabina Sdn Bhd
  - PDC Telecommunication Services Sdn Bhd
  - PDC Setia Urus Sdn Bhd
  - Solar Voltech Sdn Bhd
  - Asset Care Solutions Sdn Bhd
  - PDC Properties Sdn Bhd
  - PDC Premier Holdings Sdn Bhd
- Other PBA Holdings Berhad Subsidiaries
  - PBA Resources Sdn Bhd (Human resources management)
    - Penang Water Services Academy (Water supply training)
  - PBA Green Technology (Renewable energy)

== District and Land Offices ==
- Northeast District
- Southwest District
- North Seberang Perai District
- Central Seberang Perai District
- South Seberang Perai District

== Local governments ==
- Penang Island City Council
- Seberang Perai City Council

== Relationship with the Malaysian federal government ==
Penang has had turbulent relations with the Malaysian federal government ever since the former's inclusion into the Malayan federation in 1948. It has endured a secession attempt, periods of partisanship and fiscal imbalances brought about by Malaysia's highly centralised power structure.

The merger of Penang into the Federation of Malaya in 1948 caused discontent among George Town's business community. There were concerns that the city's free port status would be threatened by federal interference, while the Peranakans feared that non-Malay rights would be eroded under the new federation. Consequently, a secession movement was formed in the months after the merger. The movement sought to gain support from the British government and attempted to move a motion of secession through Penang's legislature, but eventually petered out. The British adamantly opposed the secession of Penang and in 1951, Secretary of State for the Colonies Jim Griffiths stated that Penang's fate was “indissolubly linked with the mainland of Malaya”.

In 1969, the Malaysian federal government revoked George Town's free port status, sparking the city's decline and widespread unemployment within the state. Economic development was redirected towards Port Klang and Kuala Lumpur by the federal government. The deteriorating economy became a major issue in the 1969 election, leading to the opposition party Gerakan taking control of the Penang state government from the ruling Alliance.

While the Alliance retained federal power, race riots in Kuala Lumpur prompted the federal government, led by Abdul Razak Hussein, to introduce the New Economic Policy (NEP), focusing on affirmative action-based economic development. The NEP's policies favouring the Malays posed a challenge for the Chinese-dominated Penang state government. Malaysia's centralised power structure also made Penang susceptible to federal-state conflicts. Chief Minister Lim Chong Eu was able to secure autonomy and freedom to implement economic reforms, by maintaining ties with Abdul Razak and ensuring order within Penang. In 1973, Gerakan joined the ruling Alliance (renamed Barisan Nasional) to guarantee Penang's inclusion in national development policies.

Penang once again became an opposition-controlled state in 2008 when Pakatan Rakyat (now Pakatan Harapan) won the state election that year. The federal government adopted an uncooperative stance towards opposition-controlled states, resulting in reduced federal funds for Penang and the bypassing of the state government in development policies. Partisanship worsened under Najib Razak's administration. In 2013, Penang received RM162.7 million in federal grants, which accounted for a mere 2.85% of the state's tax revenues to the federal government.

Continued rivalry between the federal and state governments led to Chief Minister Lim Guan Eng’s accusations that Penang was being treated as a “stepchild” by the federal government. This situation endured until the 2018 elections, when Pakatan Harapan assumed federal power for the first time in Malaysia's history. Nonetheless, calls for fiscal devolution and decentralisation still persist, as the federal constitution constricts each state's ability to generate revenue. In 2024, Lim's successor Chow Kon Yeow stated that he intended to demand a larger portion of the state's tax revenue to be returned to Penang.

== See also ==
- Penang Island City Council
- Seberang Perai City Council
- Elections in Penang
