= Dewan Sri Pinang =

Concert hall in George Town, Penang, Malaysia

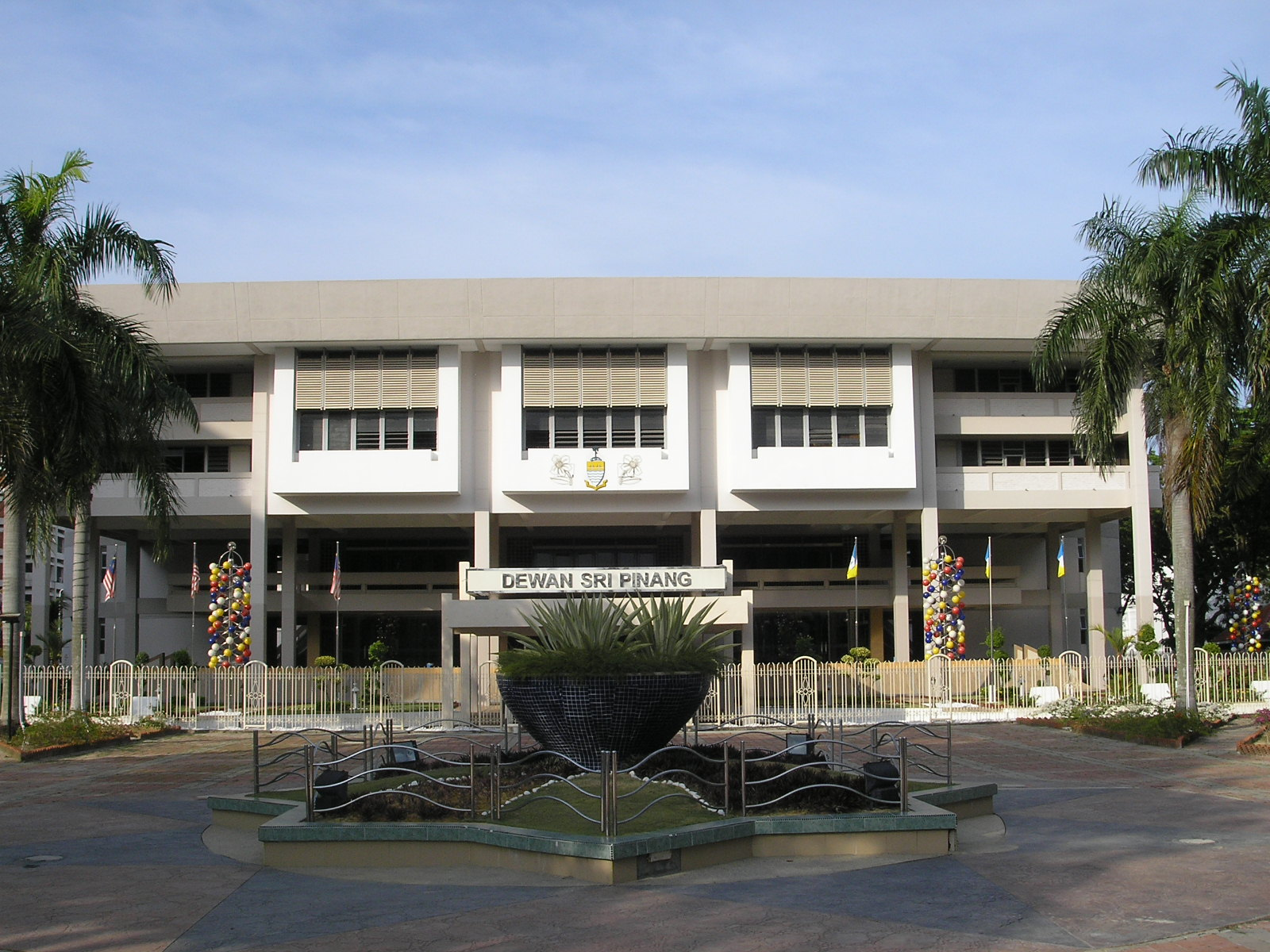
- Interactive map of Dewan Sri Pinang
- Address: Light Street; George Town; Malaysia
- Coordinates: 5.4217°N 100.3406°E
- Public transit: CAT 204 502
- Owner: Penang Island City Council
- Type: Concert hall
- Capacity: 1,300

Construction
- Opened: 1972

Dewan Sri Pinang is a multipurpose concert hall in George Town within the Malaysian state of Penang. Built in 1972, the three-storey building features a Brutalist style and contains a 1,300-seat auditorium. The venue is utilised for state events and performing arts performances.

== History ==
Proposals to build a new civic hall in George Town had emerged as early as 1962, following an unsuccessful attempt by former mayor D. S. Ramanathan to secure an allocation of $100,000 (Malaya and British Borneo dollar) in the Penang State Legislative Assembly. Although the proposal initially faced opposition from the ruling Alliance coalition, it received federal approval in 1965. The projected budget for the building was estimated at $2 million, excluding the 3-acre (1.2 ha) site that is located adjacent to the Esplanade. The Penang state government and the George Town City Council each allocated $250,000 for the construction of the hall, which was intended for cultural events and conferences.

The groundbreaking ceremony for Dewan Sri Pinang took place in 1969, led by Penang's Chief Minister Wong Pow Nee. Designed by the Public Works Department, the building was opened to public in 1972. Since then, Dewan Sri Pinang has hosted various events, including the annual conferment of state titles, seminars, weddings, civil service examinations and cultural activities such as the George Town Festival. Additionally, the Penang Philharmonic Orchestra conducts weekly practice sessions at the venue.

As part of extensive conservation projects along the northern shoreline of George Town, renovations for Dewan Sri Pinang have been proposed. State officials aimed to transform the building into Penang's equivalent of the Sydney Opera House. The planned upgrades are projected to exceed RM50 million.

== See also ==
- List of concert halls in Malaysia
