= Flag of Penang =

Penang
- Use: Civil and state flag
- Proportion: 1:2
- Adopted: 1957
- Design: A triband of light blue, white and yellow; an areca nut palm tree within the middle white band.
- Designed by: C.K. Fook

The flag of Penang consists of three vertical bands and an areca-nut palm on a grassy mount in the centre. All three bands are of equal width. From left to right, the colour of each band is light blue, white and yellow.

The colours of the flag are derived from the tinctures of the coat of arms of Penang granted by King George VI in September 1949. Light blue denotes the sea that surrounds Penang Island, white represents peace and yellow for the prosperity of the state.

The areca-nut palm, known as pokok pinang in Malay, symbolises the tree from which Penang got its name. The tree and its grassy mount is centred within the middle white band.

The flag was slightly modified to its present form in 1963 by removing a torse of blue and white at the bottom of the grassy mount.

== History ==
Penang did not have its own flag under the rule of the Sultanate of Kedah, prior to the arrival of the East India Company in 1786. The first known representation of Penang on a flag was as one of the three crowns on the flag of the Straits Settlements in use between 1877 and 1946. Following the dissolution of the Straits Settlements and the admission of Penang as a Crown colony within the Malayan Union, there appears to be little clarity as to what flag Penang used between the Straits Settlement dissolution in April 1946 and the eventual adoption of a blue ensign defaced by the 1949 arms. This would be replaced with final flag of the Crown colony was a blue ensign, defaced with a flag badge (Note: A flag badge refers to the emblem on British colonial flags identifying the colony.) depicting the areca nut palm, adopted as of the 17 June 1952 by the Settlement Council.

In the months preceding Malayan independence, the Settlement Government announced a competition on 17 May 1957 to design a new state flag for Penang. The winner, a C.K. Fook of 434, Chulia Street, was awarded $500 for his design on 20 August. The final modified design differed on the shade of blue submitted by Fook, but it was decided to award the prize to him regardless.

The new state flag of Penang was raised at noon on 30 August 1957 at the Padang (Note: The Sunday Standard reported that the "state flag" was flown during the ceremony. The same newspaper referred to the flag representing Malaya as the "federation flag".) in the presence of the new governor Raja Uda and the last resident commissioner Robert Porter Bingham. That evening, the Union Jack was lowered for the final time at 6:45 pm near Fort Cornwallis, George Town, marking the end of 171 years of British rule.

On 24 December 1957, nominated member Koh Sin Hock told the State Council that the flag's areca-nut palm did not resemble a real one, likening it to a coconut palm, and that he hoped a more realistic depiction could be used instead.

== Historical flags ==
Flag	Duration	Political Entity	Description
	1868-1874	Straits Settlements	Adopted when Penang was part of the Straits Settlements.
	1874-1904	Straits Settlements	Adopted when Penang was part of the Straits Settlements.
	1904-1925	Straits Settlements	Adopted when Penang was part of the Straits Settlements.
	1925-1946	Straits Settlements	Adopted when Penang was part of the Straits Settlements.
	1946-1949	Crown Colony of Penang	Identical to the Union Jack.
	1949-1952	Crown Colony of Penang	In use following the 1949 grant of arms
	1952-1957	Crown Colony of Penang	Flag badge depicting the areca nut palm tree leaved and fructed proper on a mound with a wreath of the colours of the settlement arms adopted on 16 June 1952 by the Settlement Council.
	1957−1959	State of Penang	Another variant of the State Flag of Penang.

== City council flags ==
Penang is divided into two local governments. The Penang Island City Council administers Penang's capital city, George Town, and the rest of the island, while the Seberang Perai City Council governs Seberang Perai on the mainland of the Malay Peninsula.

Local government	Penang Island City Council	Seberang Perai City Council
Flag		
Municipality	George Town	Seberang Perai

Previously, the city of George Town also had its own flag, which dated back to the grant of city status to the George Town City Council in 1957. The city council was eventually merged with the Penang Island Rural District Council in 1974 to form the Penang Island Municipal Council, which subsequently became the Penang Island City Council in 2015.
