= Coat of arms of Penang =

Symbol of the Malaysian state

- Armiger: Penang
- Adopted: 1983
- Crest: On a wreath of the Colours upon a mount a Pinang or Areca-nut palm leaved and fructed Proper
- Torse: Argent and Azure
- Shield: Barry wavy of ten Azure and Argent upon a chief Or a representation of the Penang Bridge Proper
- Motto: Bersatu dan Setia (United and Loyal)

The coat of arms of Penang is largely based on the coat of arms of Penang first granted to the Settlement (now State) of Penang, then in the Federation of Malaya, by a Royal Warrant of King George VI dated 11 September 1949.

Between 1911 (the date of a previous Royal Warrant) and 1946, when the colony of the Straits Settlements was dissolved, the Settlement was represented in the Straits Settlements' coat of arms by the second quarter, Argent on a mount an areca nut palm tree Proper. The Areca-nut palm is the tree from which Penang (Pulau Pinang) derives its name.

== Settlement and state arms ==
Original coat of arms of Penang, with motto added in 1950.

The coat of arms as granted was blazoned:

Shield: Barry wavy of eight Azure and Argent upon a chief embattled Or a plume of three ostrich feathers surmounted by a riband of the First on the riband the words Ich Dien in letters of the Third.

Crest: On a wreath of the Colours upon a mount a Pinang or Areca-nut palm leaved and fructed Proper.

The Prince of Wales's feathers and the motto Ich Dien referred to the fact that Penang was founded in 1786 as the Prince of Wales Island, while the blue and white bars are in reference to the Malacca Straits that surround Penang Island, separating it from Province Wellesley (now Seberang Perai) on the mainland.

The Areca-nut palm on the crest represents the origins of the Island's name.

The motto Bersatu dan Setia (Malay: "United and Loyal") was adopted by the Settlement Council of Penang in 1950. As this was during the height of the Penang secessionist movement, the motto may have implied loyalty to the British crown, rather than to the Federation of Malaya. Penang also has an unofficial motto, "Let Penang Lead".

=== Present-day state arms ===
In preparation for the completion of the Penang Bridge, the state coat of arms was changed to the present design on 1 January 1983 according to a State Government Gazette Notification No. 605 dated 25 November 1982, which can be blazoned as:

Shield: Barry wavy of ten Azure and Argent upon a chief Or a representation of the Penang Bridge Proper

Crest: On a wreath of the Colours upon a mount a Pinang or Areca-nut palm leaved and fructed Proper

Motto: "Bersatu dan Setia".

=== Historical state arms ===
Coat of arms	Duration	Political entity	Description	Notes
	1874–1941, 1945–1946	Straits Settlements	Shield: "Quarterly, the first quarter gules, issuant from the base a tower proper, on the battlements thereof a lion passant guardant Or; the second quarter argent, on a mount an areca nut palm tree proper; the third quarter also argent a sprig of the oil tree keruing proper; the fourth quarter azure in base on waves of the sea in front of a representation of the sun rising behind a mountain, a sailing yacht in full sail to the sinister, all proper." Crest: "A demi-lion rampant guardant supporting in the paws a staff proper, thereon flying to the sinister a banner azure, charged with three imperial crowns."	The "second quarter argent" containing an areca nut palm tree on a mount represented Penang.
	1949 - 1950	Crown Colony of Penang	THE ARMORIAL ENSIGNS for the Settlement Penang which have been approved by Royal Warrant read during the meeting of the Settlement Council on 29 Dec 1949.	The motto on the Coat of Arms was later adopted on 7 Nov 1950.

== Yang di-Pertua Negeri arms ==
The new arms of the Yang di-Pertua Negeri or State Governor was adopted on the same date as the present state arms and is blazoned as follow:

Shield: Barry wavy of ten Argent and Azure, overall a pale Or charged with a Pinang or areca-nut palm leaved and fructed Proper
Motto: Yang di-Pertua Negeri Pulau Pinang (Yang di-Pertua Negeri of Penang)

From 10 October 1963 until 31 December 1982, the arms of the State Governor was the same as the shield of the original state arms.

== City council arms ==
=== George Town City Council ===
Coat of arms of the George Town City Council

The arms of the George Town City Council had been granted by the English College of Arms on 4 September 1953, based on the arms of the Settlement of Penang:

Shield: Barry wavy of eight Azure and Argent a plume of three ostrich feathers Proper tied with a riband Or a chief embattled of the Last

Crest: On a wreath of the Colours issuant from a wreath of palm Vert a lion passant guardant Azure

Motto: "Leading We Serve"

The motto is a combination of the motto of the Prince of Wales, Ich Dien (I serve), and the unofficial motto of Penang, "Let Penang Lead".

=== Penang Island City Council ===
Present-day coat of arms of the Penang Island City Council

Between 1974 and 1976, the George Town City Council was merged with the Penang Island Rural District Council to form the Penang Island Municipal Council (now Penang Island City Council). The arms of the municipality is displayed on a native shield and contains much local symbolism, but generally conforms to traditional English heraldic principles, and may be blazoned as follows.

Shield: Barry wavy of eight Azure and Argent a chief embattled Or overall a Pinang or areca-nut palm leaved and fructed Proper

Crest: On a wreath of the Colours mantled Vert doubled Or a crescent therefrom issuant a mullet of the Last

Supporters: On a compartment of waves barry wavy Azure and Argent issuant therefrom a mount Vert two dolphins hauriant torqued of the First finned Or

Motto: "Memimpin Sambil Berkhidmat" (Malay: "Leading We Serve")

The municipal arms is retained by the Penang Island City Council when it was accorded city status for the entire Penang Island in 2015, hence succeeding the Municipal Council.

== Seberang Perai City Council emblem ==
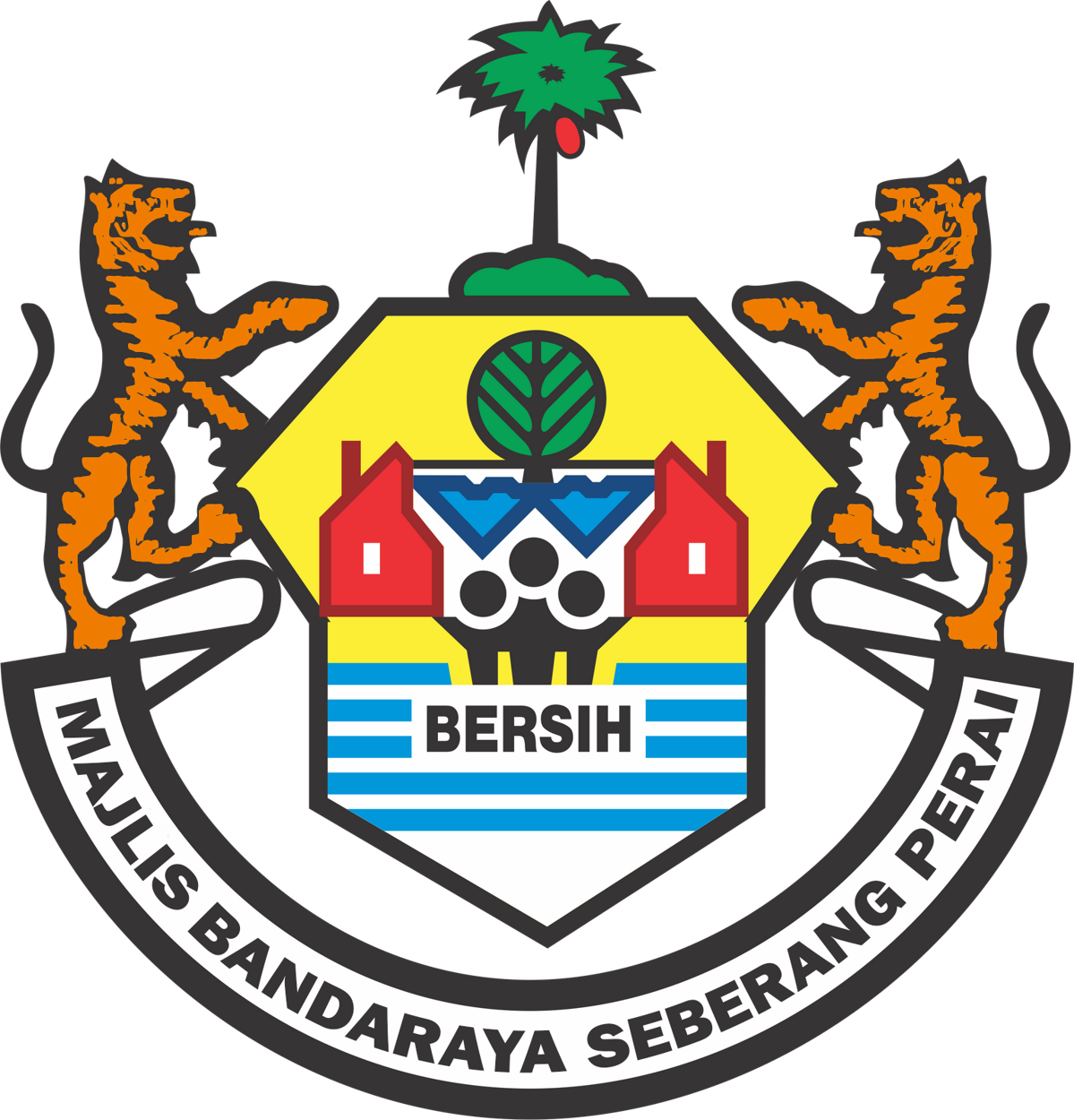
Seberang Perai City Council emblem

The emblem of Seberang Perai City Council adopted on 1 February 1983 (as a Municipal Council) consists of a Pinang or areca-nut palm, two rampant tigers and a shield depicting a tree, two red houses, one white factory and three human figures and the word "Bersih" meaning Clean and the name of the local authority in Romanised Malay. The design reflects the roles and responsibilities of the local authority in maintaining, planning and developing the Seberang Perai City area.
