= People's Court, Penang =

People's Court
- Neighbourhood of George Town
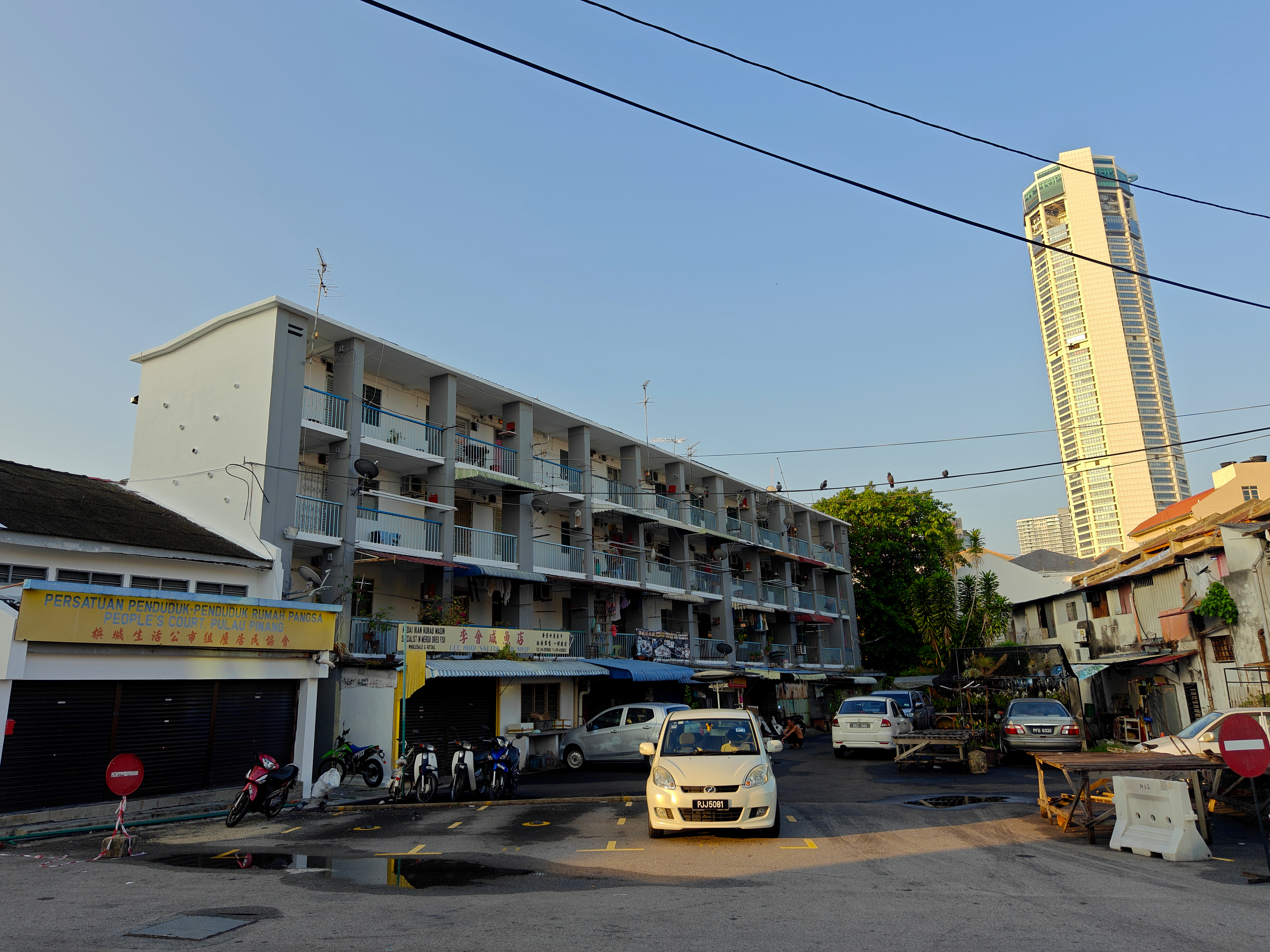

- Location within George Town in Penang
- Coordinates: 5°25′2.658″N 100°20′2.274″E
- Country: Malaysia
- State: Penang
- City: George Town
- District: Northeast
- Founded: 1961
- Time zone: UTC+8 (MST)
  - Summer (DST): Not observed
- Postal code: 10200

People's Court is a residential neighbourhood within the city of George Town in the Malaysian state of Penang. Situated within the city's central business district, it comprises three four-storey blocks of walk-up flats. Built in 1961, it was the first low-cost public housing in Malaysia and remains one of the few populated residential pockets within the city's UNESCO World Heritage Site.

== History ==
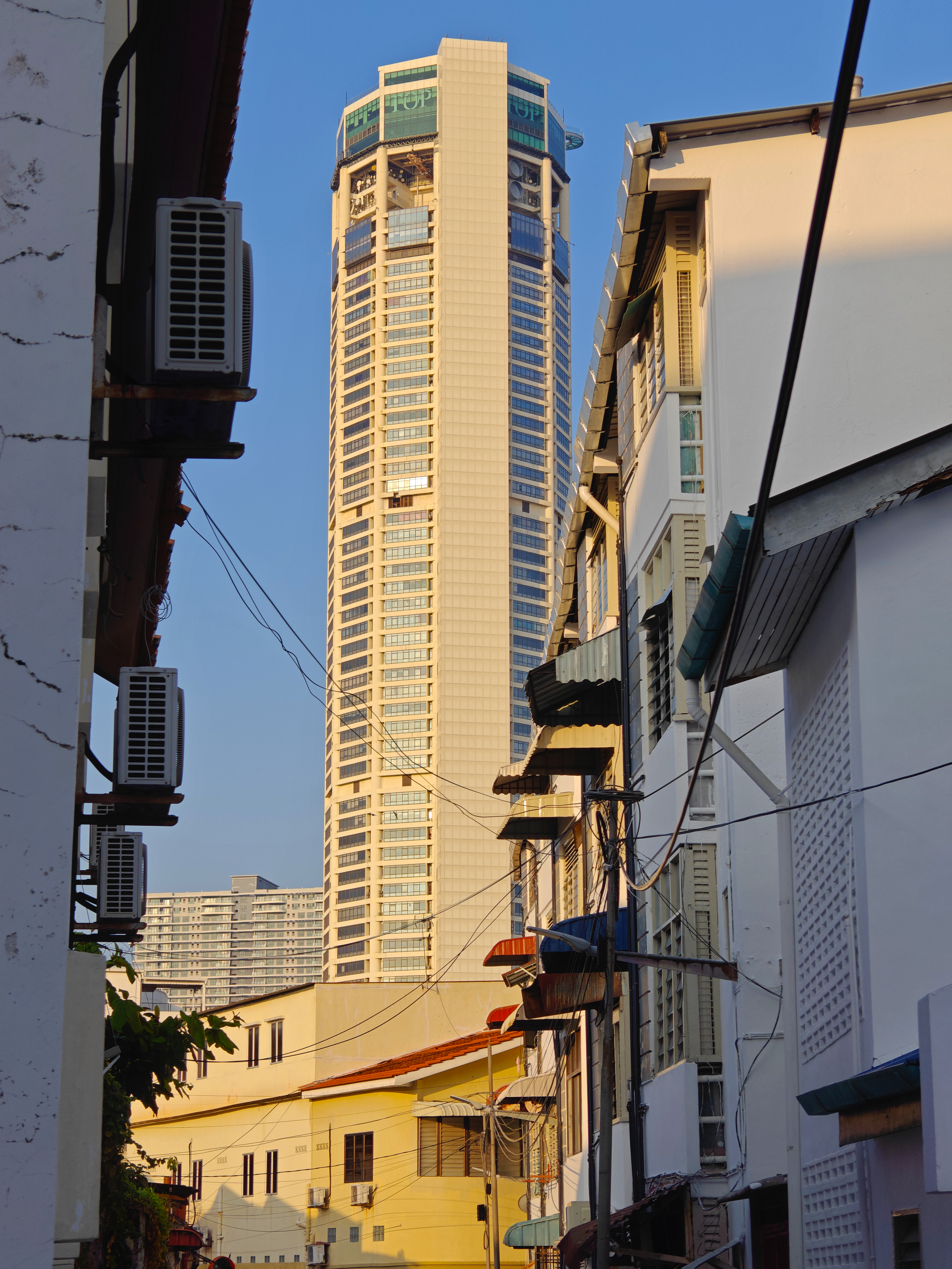
Komtar as seen from an alley at People's Court. The neighbourhood falls under the state constituency of Komtar.

After Malaya's independence in 1957, the George Town City Council faced the challenge of providing affordable housing for the urban poor. A significant number of the city's residents lived in substandard houses within urban kampongs and shophouses. According to a councillor at the time, "there are about 30 kampongs within George Town's limits with about 5,539 substandard houses inhabited by approximately 50,153 people. In about 19 kampongs the Malays are predominant and in the rest there is a mixture of Malays/Chinese and Malays/Indians".

The George Town City Council sought to address affordable housing as a crucial electoral issue, particularly after the Labour Party retained control in the 1959 local election. As part of their efforts, the city government initiated People's Court, the first low-cost public housing project in Malaya. The project consisted of three blocks of four-storey walk-up flats arranged in an 'L' shape within the city centre's Chinatown. These blocks include 26 shoplots, ranging from 136 sq ft (12.6 m^{2}) to 582 sq ft (54.1 m^{2}), along with 79 residential units, ranging between 438 sq ft (40.7 m^{2}) to 506 sq ft (47.0 m^{2}).

Since its completion in 1961, People's Court has served as a major source of low-cost housing within George Town's central business district. In spite of the continuing depopulation of the city centre, People's Court remains one of the few inhabited residential areas within the locality. The three blocks are currently owned and managed by the Penang Island City Council, which succeeded the George Town City Council.
