= George Town City Council =

Defunct local government of George Town in the Malaysian state of Penang

- Majlis Bandaraya George Town
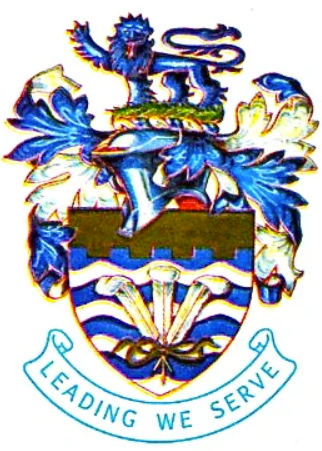
- Coat of arms (1953–1974)

Overview
- Established: 1857; 169 years ago (as the George Town Municipal Commission)
- Dissolved: 1974
- Polity: George Town
- Headquarters: City Hall; Esplanade Road; George Town

The George Town City Council (abbrev. MBGT) was a local government that administered what is now downtown George Town in the Malaysian state of Penang. It was founded in 1857 as the George Town Municipal Commission. In 1957, prior to Malaya's independence, George Town was granted city status by Queen Elizabeth II.

The city council was responsible for urban planning, public health, sanitation, waste management, traffic management, building regulation, social and economic development, and the overall upkeep of urban infrastructure within the former city limits of George Town. It enjoyed full financial autonomy and was the wealthiest local government in Malaysia, with annual revenues nearly twice that of the Penang state government. Additionally, the city council was the country's first fully-elected local government, with elections taking place since 1951.

Unlike the Alliance-controlled state government, the city council's leadership was dominated by the left-wing Labour Party. This led to political tensions between the state and city governments following Malaya's independence. In response to allegations of mismanagement, the then Penang Chief Minister Wong Pow Nee assumed control of the city government in 1966. The Indonesia–Malaysia confrontation resulted in a nationwide suspension of local government elections, and between 1974 and 1976, Wong's successor Lim Chong Eu merged the city council with the Penang Island Rural District Council to create the Penang Island Municipal Council (now Penang Island City Council).

== History ==
=== Beginnings of local governance ===
In 1795, nine years after the establishment of George Town, the settlement's administrator Philip Manington appointed a "Clerk of The Market and Scavenger". Among others, the clerk was tasked with valuating "houses and shops in the bazaar belonging to natives, according to the extent of the ground, for the support of the Police and for cleaning, making proper drains, and keeping the town in order and free from nuisance". The appointment faced resistance from the residents of George Town, who demanded that "the most equitable mode to adopt would be that a Committee of Gentlemen be appointed to fix a valuation on every particular house and that so much per cent on that valuation be levied".

In the following year, a committee of assessors was established to evaluate the trade revenue of the settlement. In 1800, an additional committee was formed to assess property values within the settlement for taxation purposes. These committees marked the beginning of a series of ad hoc advisory groups, primarily composed of European and native ratepayers, which were created to address specific issues but were not granted regulatory authority. A committee of assessors was legalised in 1827 "for the purpose of providing the means of clearing, watching, and keeping in repair the streets of the town of Penang".

=== Establishment of municipality ===
George Town served as the capital of the Straits Settlements between 1826 and 1832. In 1830, the Straits Settlements were incorporated into the Bengal Presidency, which was part of British India. Administrative reforms in Britain resulted in the Municipal Corporations Act 1835, which influenced the subsequent reorganisation of municipal governance in India.

In 1856, the India Board passed Act No. XXVII, mandating the appointment of Municipal Commissioners and taxation of the Straits Settlements. Under the act, each of the Straits Settlements – the Prince of Wales Island (now Penang Island), Singapore and Malacca – was to form a Municipal Commission consisting of five Municipal Commissioners. Of these, three were to be elected by ratepayers, one was to be appointed by the Governor of the Straits Settlements and the Resident Councillor would serve as the president. The financing of the Municipal Commissions would come from annual property assessments, with the rate determined by the Governor.

The first municipal election in George Town was held in December 1857, but public response was tepid. Voter turnout was low and there existed a tendency for voters to pick candidates along racial lines. Nevertheless, 1857 marked the birth of George Town's elected Municipal Commission, a pioneering move in British Malaya. In 1863, Act No. XXVII was amended to extend the term of each Municipal Commissioner to three years. This did little to boost public interest in municipal issues.

In 1867, the Straits Settlements became a British crown colony. Under direct British rule, Penang was assigned a Lieutenant-Governor, rather than a Resident Councillor during the Indian administration. Newly-appointed Lieutenant-Governor Edward Anson also inherited the Resident Councillor's position as president of Penang Island's Municipal Commissioners.

=== Infrastructure development ===
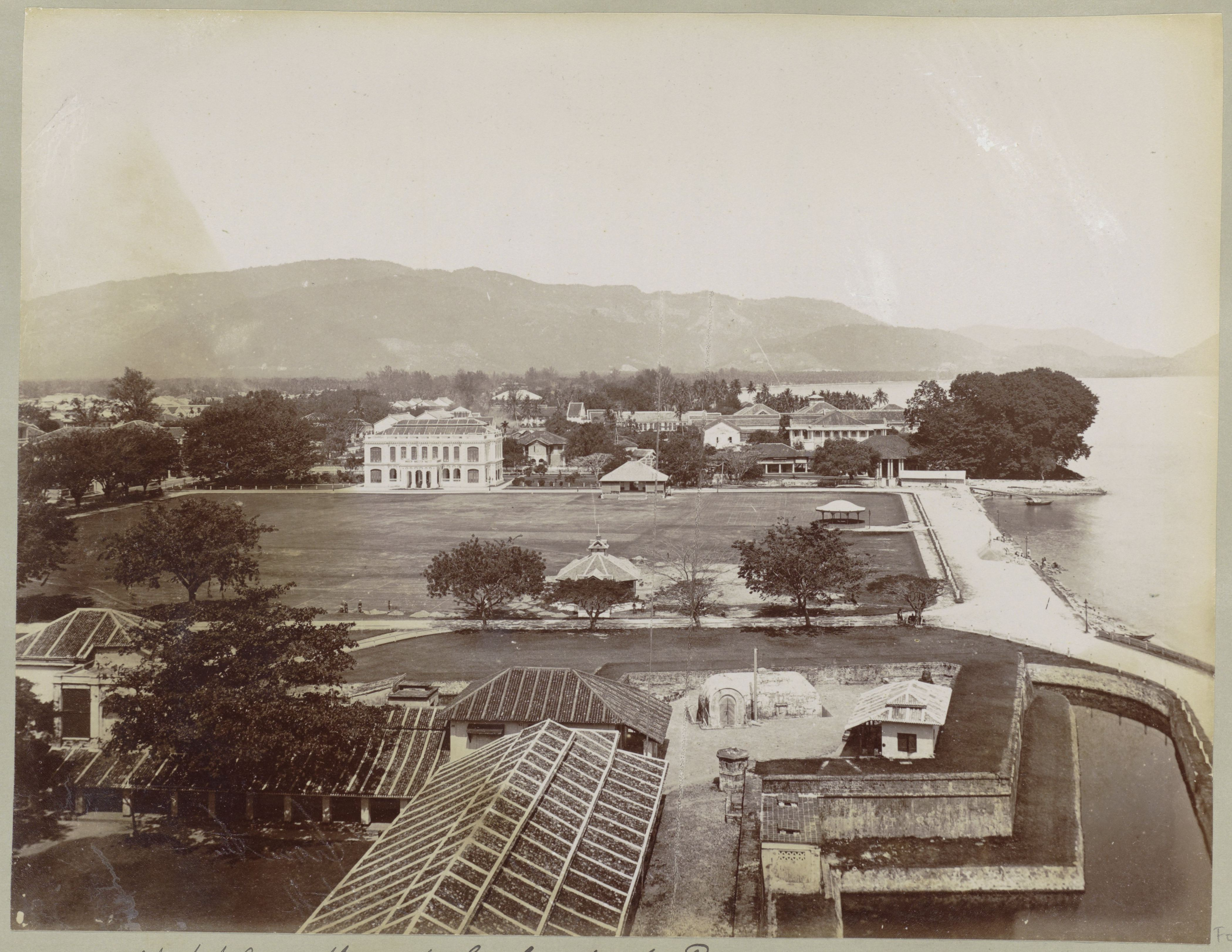
The Esplanade c. 1892, with the Town Hall visible centre-left.

The Esplanade c. 1910, with the City Hall visible centre-right. The City Hall still serves as the seat of the Penang Island City Council to this day.

The start of Lieutenant-Governor Edward Anson's tenure in 1867 coincided with the completion of 9 in (230 mm) cast iron water pipes, which replaced the older earthenware ones. Improvements to the water infrastructure across the settlement followed soon after and by 1884, raw water began being supplied from Ayer Itam through newly installed 12 in (300 mm) pipes. By 1887, all major streets had access to water supply. In 1919, the municipality established a Water Department to maintain the settlement's water infrastructure and to explore new sources of raw water. One such source was Batu Ferringhi, where water was directed to the Guillemard Reservoir which was inaugurated in 1929. The constant development of water infrastructure was credited as a key factor in supporting George Town's population growth leading up to Malaya's independence in 1957. Harold Gourley, who briefly held the presidency of the Institution of Civil Engineers in 1956, remarked that "George Town had the finest and most beautiful water supply system" he had ever encountered.

By 1890, George Town had a population of 86,900. During the 1890s, sanitation issues emerged as significant concerns due to outbreaks of typhoid and smallpox. In response to these health crises, George Town's Health Department was reorganised in 1903 and additional healthcare facilities were built. The department occasionally assumed control of hospitals to address epidemics such as malaria and mobilised its manpower to eliminate mosquito infestations within the settlement.

In 1904, George Town became the first settlement in British Malaya to be supplied with electricity. Shortly after, a department for electric supply was established, which included a sub-department to manage the tram systems that had been acquired from the Straits Settlements government. These tram services were initially run by private operators at a loss. By 1906, the tram systems were electrified and expanded to Ayer Itam. Tram services were eventually phased out by 1936 in favour of municipal trolleybuses. Meanwhile, privately-operated bus services began in 1919, with a route introduced to Tanjong Bungah.

As George Town expanded, the existing Town Hall was deemed insufficient for municipal offices, as it was also utilised for social events. The Municipal Commission faced challenges due to inadequate office space until 1903, when it relocated to the newly-completed City Hall, situated adjacent to the Town Hall.

=== Administrative reorganisations ===
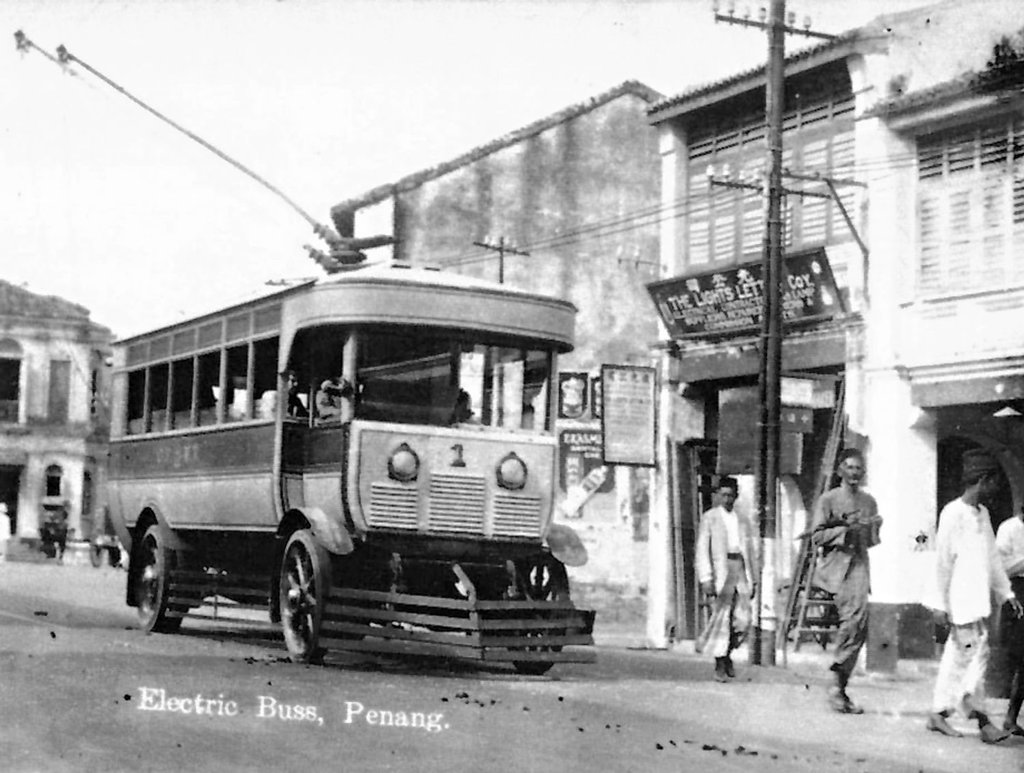
A trolleybus at Chulia Street c. 1926

In 1886, Straits Settlements Governor Frederick Weld formed a committee to draft legislation aimed at amending municipal laws and facilitating separate administration for rural areas. Weld argued that municipal expenditure should not be sourced from the Straits Settlements government and that the municipality of George Town should not be coextensive with all of Penang Island. The resulting legislation, Ordinance IX, received royal assent in 1888. This ordinance restricted George Town's Municipal Commission to the settlement itself and necessitated the delineation of municipal boundaries. The island was consequently divided into two, with the rest of the island to be administered by the Penang Island Rural District Council.

The ordinance also provided for an expansion of the Municipal Commission to six members, comprising three elected by ratepayers, two nominated and one serving ex-officio. Despite this change, the municipal election of 1888 was marked by apathy among both European and ethnic Chinese ratepayers, resulting in low voter turnout and the immediate resignation of some of the newly-elected Municipal Commissioners.

The lack of public interest in municipal elections, coupled with British perceptions that the bulk of George Town's population consisted of "transient aliens who showed no interest in their government and who would be an utterly unpredictable electorate", led to the abolition of municipal elections in 1913. Subsequently, George Town's municipal government was composed of seven commissioners including the president, all appointed by the Governor on the advice of Penang's Resident Councillor.

The municipal government initiated rudimentary town planning in 1928 to inform future policy development. A survey was completed by 1929 and finalised by 1931. These initial efforts were primarily focused on gazetting land use and establishing building lines. Comprehensive town planning legislation was not enacted until 1949.

=== Impact of World War II on municipal services ===
During the Japanese invasion of Malaya in December 1941, extensive air raids targeted George Town, resulting in significant destruction and a collapse of municipal services. The fire station within the settlement was destroyed and municipal authorities were rendered ineffective as many of their employees fled to the island's hinterlands. Residents sought refuge at Penang Hill and Ayer Itam, where Chinese communities formed informal groups in an attempt to restore order, leaving George Town largely deserted and filled with casualties. On 19 December, the Imperial Japanese Army seized George Town without encountering resistance.

George Town was targeted by Allied bombers toward the end of World War II, resulting in the destruction of several colonial landmarks. A post-war survey indicated that Allied bombings ruptured water mains at a rate approximately ten times greater than the damage caused by Japanese bombs in 1941. Upon the return of British forces in 1945, it was noted that trolleybuses were in disrepair. Areas on the outskirts of the town had developed into slums, which posed a fire hazard, and municipal waste remained uncollected during the years of Japanese occupation.

As part of post-war reconstruction efforts, the municipal government sought to provide low-cost housing for its employees and to alleviate the overcrowded slums on the outskirts of George Town. Municipal housing projects were completed at areas such as Green Lane and Jelutong. Additionally, lorries were temporarily repurposed for use as public buses to accommodate transportation needs. As George Town's population continued to grow despite the war, concerns about water sufficiency led to the extraction of raw water from new sources, such as at Teluk Bahang, and the construction of reservoirs at Bukit Dumbar with a storage capacity of 8,000,000 imp gal (36,000,000 L; 9,600,000 US gal).

=== Reintroduction of local elections ===
In 1949, George Town's president H. G. Hammett announced the intention to reintroduce municipal elections. British officials supported the move, as it was believed that participation in municipal governance would help deflect a developing secessionist movement in Penang. Subsequent official studies led to the passage of the Local Authorities Elections Ordinance in 1950. George Town was divided into three wards – Jelutong, Kelawei and Tanjong. Each ward was mandated to elect three councillors, in addition to six councillors who were to be appointed by the British High Commissioner.

The municipal election of December 1951 saw a voter turnout of 72%. The Radical Party swept six of the nine elected seats. The reintroduction of municipal elections galvanised public interest in municipal affairs, which contributed to the modernisation of George Town's public bus fleet. In addition, a new oil-powered steam power station was built near Gelugor in 1957.

On the other hand, public opposition arose against the proposed expansion of George Town's municipal limits. Between 1949 and 1954, municipal and state officials discussed the annexation of Ayer Itam, Gelugor and Tanjong Tokong into George Town. Due to protests from residents of the three areas, the proposed expansion of George Town was abandoned.

=== City status ===
In 1954, J. S. H. Cunyngham-Brown was appointed president of George Town's municipal government, a position he held until 1957. In 1956, the municipal government submitted a petition to Queen Elizabeth II requesting city status for George Town. In December that year, the Queen royal assent and the city status took effect on 1 January 1957. This made George Town the first city of the Malayan Federation, which was set to achieve independence later that year.

A few days later, George Town held its inaugural mayoral election, in which Goh Guan Hoe from the Alliance (predecessor of the present-day Barisan Nasional coalition) emerged victorious against D. S. Ramanathan from the Labour Party, becoming the first elected Mayor of George Town. This established the George Town City Council as the first fully-elected local government in Malaya.

=== Post-independence ===
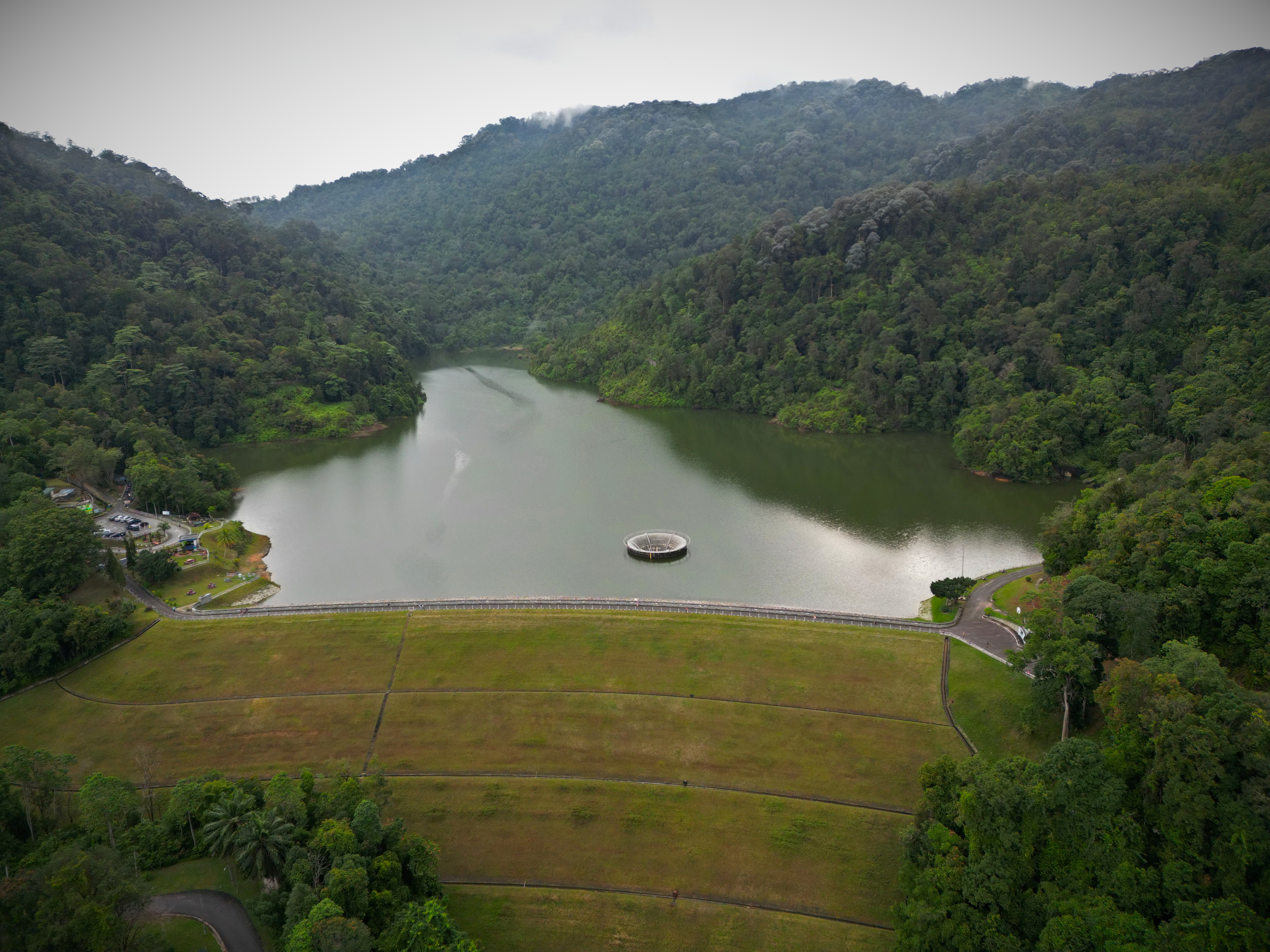
At the time of its completion in 1962, the Ayer Itam Dam was the largest in Malaya, with a capacity of 2.16 billion litres (480,000,000 imp gal; 570,000,000 US gal).

After Malaya gained independence, the new federal constitution limited the borrowing powers of local governments throughout the federation and precipitated a gradual centralisation of power in the hands of the federal government. The George Town City Council faced the possibility of being merged into the Alliance-controlled Penang state government, alongside the influence of partisan politics extending from the federal to local levels. Even before independence, the United Malays National Organisation (UMNO), the biggest component party of the Alliance, had expressed its disapproval of George Town's city status.

In December 1957, D. S. Ramanathan was elected Mayor of George Town, as his Labour Party seized a majority of seats in the George Town City Council. Partisanship remained an issue in the following years, prompting Singapore’s Mayor Ong Eng Guan to urge George Town's city councillors to address their differences during an official visit to Penang. Despite the partisanship, the Labour-led city government maintained complete financial independence, with its yearly revenue almost double that of the state government, making it the richest local government within the federation by 1965.

The financial strength of the George Town City Council facilitated its extensive powers in the maintenance and development of infrastructure, while enabling progressive policies ahead of other parts of Malaya. Low-cost public housing were built, such as the People's Court in 1961, followed by projects at Terengganu Road and Sungai Pinang. This would later lead to disputes with the state government over the provision of public housing in George Town. In the 1960s, the city government completed several infrastructure projects, including the Ayer Itam Dam and flood mitigation efforts along the Pinang River. Additionally, the city government was able to subsidise its electric supply for domestic consumers, and operated a fleet of 41 trolleybuses and 14 diesel buses, despite the public transport system operating at a deficit. The city government's pool of experienced workforce was credited with sustaining George Town's relatively well-developed infrastructure.

Ramanathan stepped down in 1959 after completing two terms as Mayor. Prior to his retirement, he advocated for an expansion of George Town's city limits, citing concerns about overcrowding. He was succeeded in 1960 by Labour politician Ooi Thiam Siew, who served as Mayor until 1964, when his party colleague Choy Chooi Yew assumed the position.

=== Political feud with the Penang state government ===
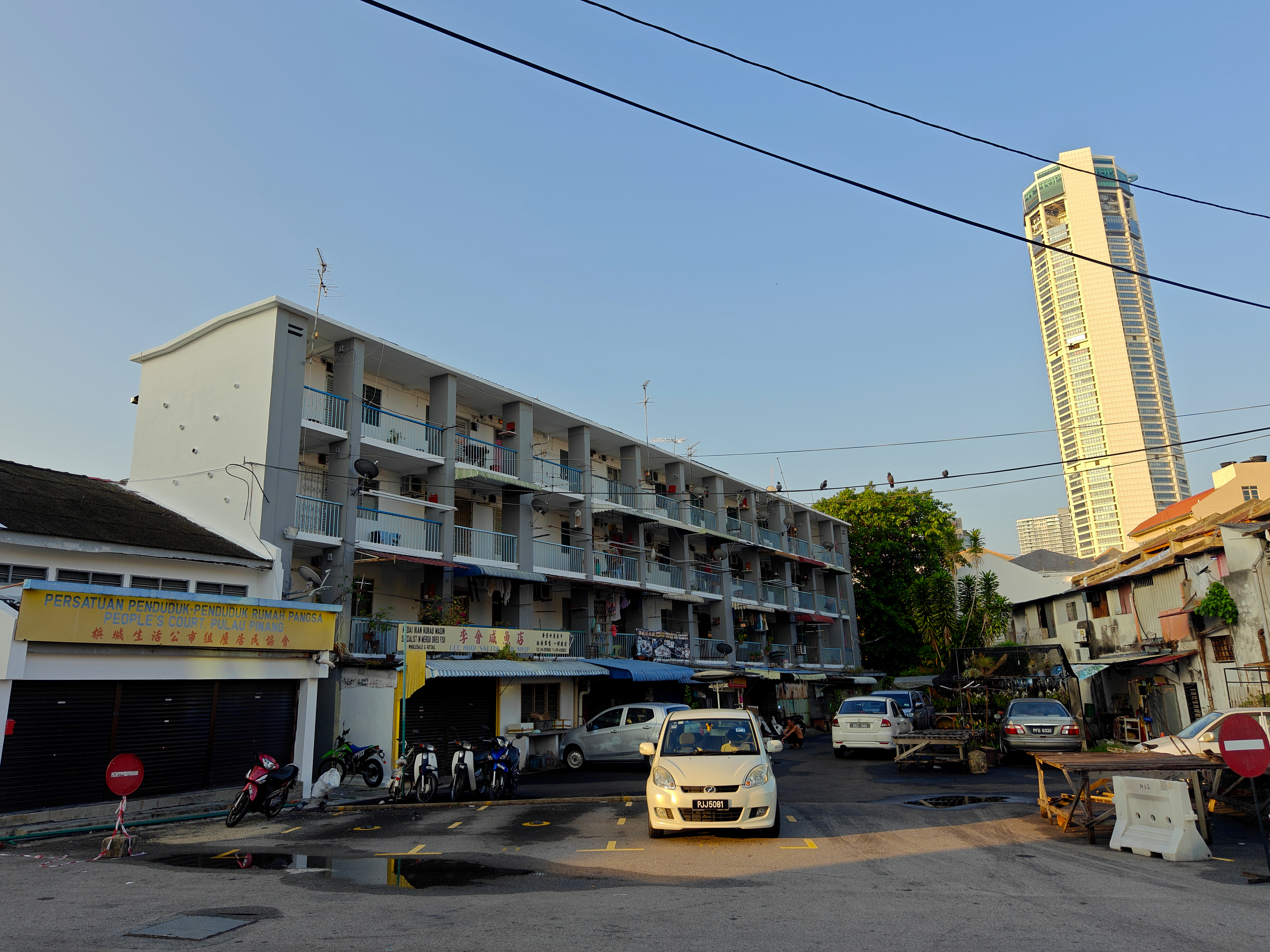
Built in 1961, the People's Court was the first low-cost public housing scheme in Malaysia.

Political tensions between the George Town City Council and the Penang state government escalated in 1963, when former Mayor D. S. Ramanathan accused the city administration of mismanagement. The state government, led by Chief Minister Wong Pow Nee, had been irked with the city's relative wealth and sought to leverage the situation by establishing a commission of inquiry to examine Ramanathan's claims. Later that year, the Labour-led city government deliberately boycotted Malaysia Day festivities by opting not to decorate the streets; the Labour party had viewed the formation of Malaysia as a neocolonial endeavour. The discord between the state and city administrations deepened further when the city government intervened to prevent the demolition of a squatter village.

In 1965, local government elections were put on hold throughout Malaysia due to the Indonesia–Malaysia confrontation. Meanwhile, Wong maneuvered within the state executive council to have the city government temporarily suspended, pending the findings of the inquiry. In 1966, he announced a takeover of the George Town City Council through the Municipal (Amendment) (Penang) Enactment, which transferred all administrative functions of the city to the Chief Minister. This made Wong the first Chief Minister to govern George Town directly. In response, the city government attempted to take legal action against the state government, but their efforts were rendered ineffective by a legislative amendment.

Although the inquiry concluded that there was "no case of corruption sufficiently verifiable for prosecution" and did not support the continued suspension of the George Town City Council, the state government decided to suspend the city government indefinitely. Together with the suspension of local government elections throughout Malaysia, it marked the demise of local democracy and an independent local government in George Town.

=== Merger ===
Chief Minister Wong Pow Nee's administration came to an end with the 1969 state election, when the Alliance lost control the state legislature to Gerakan. Lim Chong Eu took over as Chief Minister, but despite his electoral pledge to restore municipal elections, Lim soon realised its futility without the support of the Alliance-controlled federal government, which was forced to impose a nationwide state of emergency following post-election sectarian violence in Kuala Lumpur.

Instead, Lim pursued a massive restructuring of local governments in Penang. At the time, the local government structure consisted of the George Town City Council and the Penang Island Rural District Council on Penang Island, while mainland Seberang Perai was divided among three rural district councils. The rural district councils were regarded as ineffective; a 1971 study proposed reorganising Penang into a two-city administration system – one encompassing all of Penang Island and another for Seberang Perai. Lim subsequently consolidated the authority of the rural district councils under the Chief Minister's Office.

By the 1970s, the George Town City Council faced financial difficulties. Water supply struggled to keep up with the increasing population, while the oil crisis of 1973 escalated electricity production costs. This led to the transfer of the city government's electric supply department to the National Electricity Board (predecessor of the present-day Tenaga Nasional). Other areas such as healthcare and public transport were also impacted. Despite these issues, the city government still possessed a skilled workforce, which Lim saw as advantageous in the event of a merger of the local governments on Penang Island.

By 1973, the federal government had decided to restructure local governments nationwide to improve efficiency. In 1974, Lim announced the merger of the George Town City Council with the Penang Island Rural District Council, creating a unified management board for all of Penang Island. In 1976, despite the recommendations of a royal commission for the restoration of local government elections, the federal Parliament passed the Local Government Act, which mandated the appointment of mayors and councillors by the respective state governments. By year's end, Lim's administration applied the Act in Penang, reforming the island's management board into the Penang Island Municipal Council (now Penang Island City Council).

== Legacy ==
With a municipal administration originating in 1857, George Town was the first settlement in Malaysia to establish a tradition of local democracy. Between 1951 and 1965, the George Town City Council exemplified the peak of local democracy in Malaysia. While political feuding against the Alliance eventually led to its suspension, the Labour-led city government was credited with reforming municipal governance to better address local needs, reducing corruption and implementing progressive policies that were novel for Malaya during the federation's early years, including public housing schemes and the maintenance of broad aspects of urban infrastructure from drainage systems to power supply. To this day, the Penang Island City Council still maintains its lineage from the Municipal Commission that was established in 1857.

The decades that followed the establishment of the Penang Island Municipal Council saw a prolonged debate on George Town's city status. According to Clause 3 of the Local Government (Merger of the City Council of George Town and the Rural District Council of Penang Island) Order, 1974,

"the status of the City of George Town as a city shall continue to be preserved and maintained and shall remain unimpaired by the merger hereby effected".

However, the Barisan Nasional-controlled federal government maintained that George Town had effectively lost its city status. Following the 2008 state election, which brought Pakatan Rakyat (predecessor to the present-day Pakatan Harapan coalition) to power in Penang, the issue of George Town's city status reignited tensions between the federal and Penang state governments.

In 2015, George Town's jurisdiction was expanded by the federal government to encompass the entirety of Penang Island and the surrounding islets. The original jurisdiction of the George Town City Council is largely coterminus with what is now considered the city centre of George Town.

== List of mayors ==
#	Name of Mayors	Party	In office
1	Goh Guan Hoe	Alliance	1957
2	D. S. Ramanathan	Labour	1957 – 1959
3	Ooi Thiam Siew	Labour	1960 – 1964
4	Choy Chooi Yew	Labour	1964 – 1966

== See also ==
- Urban Council
- Singapore City Council
