= Penang Philharmonic Orchestra =

Malaysian orchestra

Penang Philharmonic
- Orchestra
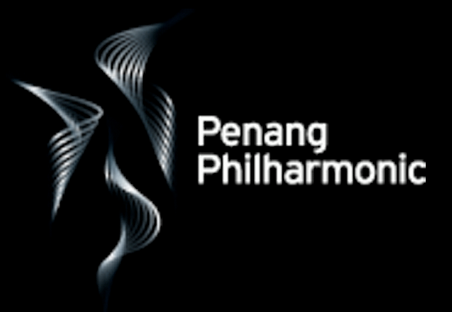
- Native name: Orkestra Filharmonik; Pulau Pinang
- Founded: 2008
- Location: Penang, Malaysia
- Concert hall: Dewan Sri Pinang
- Website: PPO official website

The Penang Philharmonic Orchestra (PPO; Malay: Orkestra Filharmonik Pulau Pinang) is an amateur orchestra funded by the state of Penang in Malaysia. The formation of the orchestra aims to build a community that enhances the standard of classical music in Penang. Established in 2010, the PPO performs a wide-ranging of music genre, mainly classical music from various repertoire. Todate, it has a total of 80 musicians and holds regular concerts throughout the year.

This orchestra is under the umbrella of Penang Philharmonic, which is formerly known as Penang State Symphony Orchestra and Chorus, founded in 1996.

== Music directors / conductors ==
- Jascha Yasufumi Shimano (2003–2009) Music Director / Resident conductor (Note: Under Penang State Symphony Orchestra)
- Woon Wen Kin (2010–2012) Music Director / Resident conductor
- Ng Choong Yen (2013–) Resident conductor

== Penang Philharmonic Chamber Choir ==
"Voices of Penang Philharmonic (VOPP)" is the resident chorus for Penang Philharmonic. It was established in 2012

In March 2019, Penang Philharmonic Orchestra has announced that VOPP, which was originally formed for youth choir to be opened to choristers aged between 18 and 40, and later changed its name to Penang Philharmonic Chamber Choir (PPCC) This rebranding strategy is coherent with Penang Philharmonic's vision to push the resident choir to greater heights. The age restriction has also been removed to recruit the crème de la crème in the local choral scene.

As of 2019, the chorus is led by the artistic directors and choral conductors Lim Ai Hooi and Yong Chee Foon, and assistant conductor, Ong Geok Cheng.
