= Mayor of Penang Island =

Head of the local government in Penang Island

- Datuk Bandar Pulau Pinang
- Coat of arms of George Town
- Incumbent; Rajendran P. Anthony since 6 May 2023
- Penang Island City Council
- Reports to: Chief Minister of Penang
- Seat: City Hall, George Town
- Appointer: Chief Minister of Penang
- Term length: Two years
- Inaugural holder: Patahiyah Ismail
- Formation: 1 January 2015; 11 years ago
- Website: mbpp.gov.my

The Mayor of Penang Island is the chief executive for the local government of George Town, the capital of the Malaysian state of Penang. The Mayor's responsibilities include the management of the Penang Island City Council's annual budget, which amounted to RM466.3 million in 2025.

== Chronological list ==
=== Mayor of George Town ===
Between 1957 and 1966, the city of George Town, under the governance of the George Town City Council, was led by four Mayors.

#	Name of Mayors	Party	In office	Note
1	Goh Guan Hoe	Alliance	1957	
2	D. S. Ramanathan	Labour	1957 – 1959	
3	Ooi Thiam Siew	Labour	1960 – 1964	
4	Chooi Yew Choy	Labour	1964 – 1966	

In 1966, the functions of the George Town City Council were taken over by the then Chief Minister of Penang, Wong Pow Nee.

=== Mayor of Penang Island ===
To date, the Penang Island City Council has been headed by four successive mayors.

Patahiyah Ismail served as the first female Mayor of Penang Island from 2015 to 2017, when she was succeeded by Maimunah Mohd Sharif. However, Maimunah's tenure lasted for only a year, following her concurrent appointment as the executive director of the United Nations Human Settlements Programme by the Secretary-General of the United Nations, António Guterres; Maimunah thus became the first Asian to be elected for the role.

Yew Tung Seang was subsequently appointed as the third Mayor of Penang Island. He held the position until 2023, when Rajendran P. Anthony was appointed as his successor.

#	Mayor	Term	Note
1	Patahiyah Ismail	31 March 2015 – 30 June 2017	
2	Maimunah Mohd Sharif	1 July 2017 – 19 January 2018	
3	Yew Tung Seang	20 January 2018 – 5 May 2023	
4	Rajendran P. Anthony	6 May 2023 – present	

== See also ==
- Penang Island City Council
