= 1957 Malayan local elections =

Malaysia election 1957

Local elections were held in the Federation of Malaya in 1957.

== Mayoral election ==
=== George Town ===
Date: 2 January 1957; Electorate: Turnout:
| Candidates | Party | Votes |
| G. H. Goh | Alliance (MCA) | 6 councillors |
| D. S. Ramanathan | Labour | 5 councillors |

Date: 30 December 1957; Electorate: Turnout:
| Candidates | Party | Votes |
| D. S. Ramanathan | Labour | |

== City council election ==
=== George Town ===
Date: 7 December 1957; Electorate: 41,799; Turnout:
| Wards | Elected councillor | Elected party | Votes | Majority | Opponent(s) | Party | Votes |
Labour 4 (8) | Alliance 1 (5) | Independent 0 (2)
| Jelutong | 1. Ooi Thiam Siew | Labour | | | 2. Abdullah Ariff | Alliance (UMNO) | |
| Kelawei | 1. Chang Poh Jung | Labour | | | 2. Kamaluddin Baboo | Alliance (UMNO) | |
| Sungei Pinang | 1. D. S. Ramanathan | Labour | | | 2. Lim Eng Hooi | Alliance (MCA) | |
| Tanjong East | 1. Lee Kok Liang | Labour | | | S. M. Mohamed Idris; Khoo Yat See | Alliance (UMNO); Ind. | |
| Tanjong West | 1. Lim Kean Siew | Labour | | | Lee Woon Mun; G. O. Singh | Alliance (MCA); Ind. | |

== Municipal election ==
=== Kuala Lumpur ===
Date: 7 December 1957; Electorate: Turnout:
| Wards | Elected councillor | Elected party | Votes | Majority | Opponent(s) | Party | Votes | Spoilt votes |
Labour 1 (?)
| Bangsar | 1. V. David | Labour | 1,055 | 213 | 2. Gurdial Singh | Alliance (MIC) | 842 | 26 |
| Imbi | 1. Cheah Theam Siew | | Unopposed | | | | | |
| Petaling | 1. Lim Jew Siang | | Unopposed | | | | | |
| Sentul | 1. Abdullah Yassin | Alliance (UMNO) | Unopposed | | | | | |

=== Malacca ===
Date: 7 December 1957; Electorate: Turnout:
| Wards | Elected councillor | Elected party | Votes | Majority | Opponent(s) | Party | Votes |
Malayan Party 3 (?) | Alliance 2 (?) | Labour 1 (?)
| Bukit China | 1. Paul Anthony Prabalan | Malayan Party | 1,281 | 571 | 2. George Ivan Taye | Alliance (MIC) | 710 |
| Fort | 1. Tan Kee Gak | Malayan Party | 1,226 | 505 | 2. Cheng Chia Hua | Alliance (MCA) | 721 |
| Mata Kuching | 1. Hashim Abdul Ghani; 2. Chong Kong Ying; 3. Mohamed Abdul Rahman | Malayan Party; Labour; Alliance (UMNO) | 864; 765; 758 | 99 | 4. Yusoff Sulong; 5. Yong Kong Yim; 6. Syed Omar Abdullah Alhabshee | Alliance (UMNO); Labour; Alliance (UMNO) | 739; 684; 681 |
| Tranquerah | 1. Lim Yeow Koon | Alliance (MCA) | 987 | 141 | 2. Yap Eng Tee | Malayan Party | 846 |

== Town councils election ==
=== Alor Star ===
Date: Electorate: Turnout:
| Wards | Elected councillor | Elected party | Votes | Majority | Opponent(s) | Party | Votes |
?
| Kampong | 1. | | | | | | |
| Pekan | 1. | | | | | | |
| Seberang | 1. | | | | | | |

=== Bandar Maharani, Muar ===
Date: 7 December 1957; Electorate: Turnout:
| Wards | Elected councillor | Elected party | Votes | Majority | Opponent(s) | Party | Votes |
?
| Maharani | 1. | | | | | | |
| Parit Stongkat | 1. | | | | | | |
| Sultan Ibrahim | 1. | | | | | | |

=== Bandar Penggaram, Batu Pahat ===
Date: 7 December 1957; Electorate: Turnout:
| Wards | Elected councillor | Elected party | Votes | Majority | Opponent(s) | Party | Votes |
?
| Gunong Soga | 1. 2. | | | | | | |
| Jalan Sultanah | 1. | | | | | | |
| Kampong Petani | 1. | | | | | | |

=== Bukit Mertajam ===
Date: 7 December 1957; Electorate: 4,468; Turnout:
| Wards | Elected councillor | Elected party |
?
| | 1. | |
| | 1. | |

=== Butterworth ===
Date: 7 December 1957; Electorate: 5,145; Turnout:
| Wards | Elected councillor | Elected party |
?
| | 1. | |
| | 1. | |

=== Ipoh-Menglembu ===
Date: 2 March 1957; Electorate: Turnout:
| Wards | Elected councillor | Elected party | Votes | Majority | Opponent(s) | Party | Votes | Spoilt votes |
?
| Green Town | 1. | | | | D. R. Seenivasagam; Mohamed Yunan Abdullah Sani | | | |

Date: 7 December 1957; Electorate: Turnout:
| Wards | Elected councillor | Elected party | Votes | Majority | Opponent(s) | Party | Votes | Spoilt votes |
PPP 2 (2) | NAP 1 (1) | Alliance 1 (9)
| Green Town | 1. D. R. Seenivasagam | PPP | 1,150 | 420 | 2. Yeoh Kian Teik | Alliance (MCA) | 730 | 7 |
| Menglembu | 1. Cheong Pak Keen | NAP | 739 | 237 | 2. Chew Peng Loon | Alliance (MCA) | 502 | |
| Pasir Puteh | 1. Mohamed Yunan Abdullah Sani | Alliance (UMNO) | 738 | 183 | 2. Choy Kok Kuan | PPP | 555 | 12 |
| Silibin | 1. Toh Seang Eng | PPP | 843 | 221 | 2. A. K. Subramaniam | Alliance (MIC) | 622 | 12 |

=== Johore Bahru ===
Date: 7 December 1957; Electorate: Turnout:
| Wards | Elected councillor | Elected party | Votes | Majority | Opponent(s) | Party | Votes | Spoilt votes |
Alliance 4 (12)
| Ayer Molek | 1. Ahmad Mohamed Shah | Alliance (UMNO) | 339 | 48 | 2. Wan Mohamed Ibrahim | Negara | 291 | 6 |
| Nong Chik | 1. Sanudin Abdul Manas | Alliance (UMNO) | 477 | 73 | 2. Annuar A. Malek | Negara | 404 | 18 |
| Tampoi | 1. Lee Teck Ching | Alliance (MCA) | 281 | 197 | 2. Abdul Raof Aman | Negara | 84 | 17 |
| Tebrau | 1. Syed Abdul Rahman Ahmad | Alliance (UMNO) | 301 | 60 | 2. Mohamed Abdul Jabar | Negara | 241 | 11 |

=== Kampar ===
Date: Electorate: Turnout:
| Wards | Elected councillor | Elected party | Votes | Majority | Opponent(s) | Party | Votes |
?
| Central | 1. | | | | | | |
| North | 1. | | | | | | |
| South | 1. | | | | | | |

=== Klang ===
Date: Electorate: Turnout:
| Wards | Elected councillor | Elected party | Votes | Majority | Opponent(s) | Party | Votes |
?
| Klang North | 1. | | | | | | |
| Klang South | 1. | | | | | | |
| Port Swettenham | 1. | | | | | | |

=== Kluang ===
Date: 2 November 1957; Electorate: Turnout:
| Wards | Elected councillor | Elected party | Votes | Majority | Opponent(s) | Party | Votes |
?
| Gunong Lambak | 1. | | | | | | |
| Mengkibol | 1. | | | | | | |
| Mesjid Lama | 1. | | | Mokhtar Zainuddin; Bahari Taib | | | |

=== Kota Bharu ===
Date: Electorate: Turnout:
| Wards | Elected councillor | Elected party | Votes | Majority | Opponent(s) | Party | Votes |
?
| Kubang Pasu | 1. | | | | | | |
| Kota Lama | 1. | | | | | | |
| Wakaf Pasu | 1. | | | | | | |

=== Kuala Kangsar ===
Date: Electorate: Turnout:
| Wards | Elected councillor | Elected party | Votes | Majority | Opponent(s) | Party | Votes |
?
| Idris | 1. | | | | | | |
| Kangsar | 1. | | | | | | |
| Kenas | 1. | | | | | | |

=== Kuala Pilah ===
Date: 1 June 1957; Electorate: Turnout:
| Wards | Elected councillor | Elected party | Votes | Majority | Opponent(s) | Party | Votes |
?
| Bukit Temensu | 1. Lee Geok Swee; 2. Yahaya Ahmad; 3. Jayantilal | Perikatan; Perikatan; Perikatan | | | Pir Muhammad Mohamad Ali | Labour | |
| Kampong Dioh | 1. Victor Ho Hong Yeow; 2. Abdul Kadir Abdullah; 3. Chan Chun Ying | Perikatan; Perikatan; Perikatan | | | | | |
| Pekan Lama | 1. Mansor Abdullah; 2. Chong Foo Khin; 3. Maarof Ali | Perikatan; Perikatan; Perikatan | | | | | |

=== Kuala Trengganu ===
Date: Electorate: Turnout:
| Wards | Elected councillor | Elected party | Votes | Majority | Opponent(s) | Party | Votes | Electorate | Turnout |
Alliance 2 (?) | Independent 1 (?)
| Bukit Besar | 1. Mohamed Abdullah | Alliance (UMNO) | Unopposed | | | | | | |
| Kuala | 1. Toh Kim Chong | Alliance (MCA) | | | Syed Alwi | Ind. | | | |
| Ladang | 1. Mutalib Salleh | Ind. | 268 | 155 | Abdul Rashid Hussein | Alliance (UMNO) | 113 | 3,055 | 16.56% |

=== Kuantan ===
Date: 2 March 1957; Electorate: Turnout:
| Wards | Elected councillor | Elected party | Votes | Majority | Opponent(s) | Party | Votes |
?
| Central Town | 1. | | | | | | |
| Tanah Puteh | 1. | | | | | | |
| Telok Sisek | 1. | | | | | | |

=== Pasir Mas ===
Date: Electorate: Turnout:
| Wards | Elected councillor | Elected party |
?
| Lemal | 1. | |
| Kampong Bahru | 1. | |
| Pengkalan Pasir | 1. | |

=== Raub ===
Date: 20 December 1957; Electorate: Turnout:
| Wards | Elected councillor | Elected party |
?
| Raub Australian Gold Mine | 1. | |
| Raub Town | 1. | |
| Sempalit | 1. | |
| Tanjong Gadong | 1. | |

=== Segamat ===
Date: 2 November 1957; Electorate: Turnout:
| Wards | Elected councillor | Elected party | Votes | Majority | Opponent(s) | Party | Votes |
?
| Buloh Kasap | 1. | | | | | | |
| Gemereh | 1. | | | | Soon Boon Seng; Tan Boon Chiong | | |
| Genuang | 1. | | | | | | |

=== Seremban ===
Date: 7 December 1957; Electorate: Turnout:
| Wards | Elected councillor | Elected party | Votes | Majority | Opponent(s) | Party | Votes |
Alliance ? (7) | Labour ? (5)
| Lake | 1. | | | | | | |
| Lobak | 1. | | | | Kat Fye Hin; S. Amir Singh Gill | | |
| Rahang | 1. 2. | | | | Benson Lim Heng Kein; Govindan Suppiah; Lam Teck Choon; Robert Singam | | |
| Temiang | 1. | | | | | | |

=== Sungei Patani ===
Date: Electorate: Turnout:
| Wards | Elected councillor | Elected party |
?
| Pekan Bahru | 1. | |
| Pekan Lama | 1. | |
| Rural | 1. | |

=== Taiping ===
Date: 7 December 1957; Electorate: Turnout:
| Wards | Elected councillor | Elected party | Votes | Majority | Opponent(s) | Party | Votes | Spoilt votes |
Alliance 2 (7) | Labour 2 (2)
| Assam Kumbang | 1. Hwang Yun Chih; 2. Mohamed Noor Mohamed | Alliance (MCA); Alliance (UMNO) | 449; 400 | 9 | 3. Lim Chye Guan; 4. Nor Rashid Ariffin | Labour; Labour | 428; 378 | 13 |
| Kota | 1. Goh Ah Hin | Labour | 564 | 133 | 2. Ooi Cheng Hoe | Alliance (MCA) | 431 | 13 |
| Klian Pau | 1. Saba Ratnam Sellar | Labour | 716 | 314 | 2. Ng Pi Ca | Alliance (MCA) | 402 | 27 |

=== Tanjong Malim ===
Date: Electorate: Turnout:
| Wards | Elected councillor | Elected party | Votes | Majority | Opponent(s) | Party | Votes |
?
| Beirop | 1. | | | | | | |
| Idris | 1. | | | | | | |
| Malacca | 1. | | | | | | |

=== Teluk Anson ===
Date: Electorate: Turnout:
| Wards | Elected councillor | Elected party | Votes | Majority | Opponent(s) | Party | Votes |
?
| Changkat Jong | 1. | | | | | | |
| Denison Road | 1. | | | | | | |
| Pasir Bedamar | 1. | | | | | | |

=== Temerloh-Mentekab ===
Date: 19 January 1957; Electorate: Turnout:
| Wards | Elected councillor | Elected party | Votes | Majority | Opponent(s) | Party | Votes |
?
| Mentekab North | 1. 2. 3. | | | | | | |
| Mentekab South | 1. 2. 3. | | | | | | |
| Temerloh North | 1. 2. 3. | | | | | | |
| Temerloh South | 1. 2. 3. | | | | | | |

Date: 28 December 1957; Electorate: Turnout:
| Wards | Elected councillor | Elected party | Votes | Majority | Opponent(s) | Party | Votes |
?
| Mentekab North | 1. | | | | | | |
| Mentekab South | 1. | | | | | | |
| Temerloh North | 1. | | | | | | |
| Temerloh South | 1. | | | | | | |
