= Crown Colony of Penang =

British colony in Asia from 1946 to 1957

Crown Colony of Penang Pulau Pinang (Malay)
- 1946–1957
- Flags; Top: 1949–1952; Bottom: 1952–1957 Coat of arms
- Anthem: God Save the King (1946–1952); God Save the Queen (1952–1957)
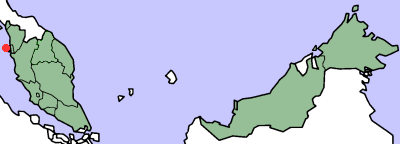
- Location of Penang
- Status: Crown colony
- Capital: George Town
- Common languages: Chinese; English; Malay; Tamil
- Monarch
  - 1946–1952: George VI
  - 1952–1957: Elizabeth II
- Resident-Councillor
  - 1946–1948: Sydney Noel King
- Historical era: Post-war · Cold War
  - Dissolution of the Straits Settlements: 1 April 1946
  - Independence from the United Kingdom: 31 August 1957
- Currency: Malayan dollar
Preceded by	Succeeded by
British Military Administration (Malaya); Straits Settlements	Federation of Malaya; Penang
- Today part of: Malaysia

The Crown Colony of Penang was a British Crown colony from 1946 to 1957. It came under British sovereignty after being ceded by the Sultanate of Kedah in 1786, and had been part of the Straits Settlements from 1826 to 1946. Together with Singapore, it became a Crown colony under the direct control of the British Colonial Office in London until it was incorporated into the Malayan Union.

== History ==
The British East India Company gained Penang in 1786 and established a trading post. It was ceded by the Sultan of Kedah to ensure the former's protection against the threat posed by its Siamese and Burmese neighbors. It was transformed into a Crown colony, substituting state for company control through the Straits Settlement 1867. During World War II, it was occupied by the Japanese from 1942 to 1945.

After the post-war dissolution of the Straits Settlements Penang and Malacca become crown colonies in the Federation of Malaya, while Singapore became a standalone Crown colony, separate from Malaya. In 1955, Tunku Abdul Rahman held a meeting with the British to discuss the end of British rule in Penang with a merger with the Malayan Union (which was then replaced by the Federation of Malaya). On 31 August 1957, when Malaya achieved its independence from the United Kingdom, Penang was integrated as a state of the federation, which later became Malaysia when it merged with other territories in British Borneo.

== See also ==
- Penang secessionist movement
- Crown Colony of Malacca
