= Clough, Smith =

UK manufacturer of transport related electrical equipment

Interserve Rail
- Industry: Automotive; Electrical engineering Facilities management
- Founded: 1910
- Founder: Norman Clough; Sidney Smith
- Headquarters: England
- Products: Trolleybuses; Rail electrical systems
- Brands: Straker-Clough; Karrier-Clough
- Services: Rail management
- Parent: Interserve

Interserve Rail (formerly Clough Smith) is a British engineering and facilities management company. Founded in 1910, it is a subsidiary of Interserve.

== History ==
Clough Smith was founded in 1910 by electrical engineers Norman Clough and Sidney Smith, who moved into the manufacture of overhead power supplies for electrical tramways and trolleybuses. It designed and manufactured both overhead and rail supplies for many systems in Britain prior to World War I.

Post-war, the company used the profits from completion of work on the Teesside trolley system to purchase trolleybuses which had been in storage during the war. These were immediately sold at a profit and provided a basis for the trolleybus side of the business.

The general manager of the Teesside Railless Traction Board developed a new and improved trolleybus design and Clough Smith arranged for it to be manufactured It was marketed as the Straker-Clough trolley omnibus. This chassis and design came to be regarded as both pioneering and improving the industry standard. The chassis was manufactured by Straker-Squire, the electrical equipment by British Thomson-Houston of Rugby, with Clough arranging the production of the bodies. The completed product was sold to system operators as part of a package deal which included the design, supply and installation of the overhead electrical equipment.

Between October 1921 and September 1926, Clough Smith sold 63 solid-tyred trolley omnibuses. Most went to various corporations in Yorkshire, but some were exported to Bloemfontein, South Africa and George Town, Penang.

In 1925, Straker-Squire was placed in voluntary liquidation and subsequently into receivership. By this time, Karrier had produced the UK's first three-axle passenger vehicle aided by developments in pneumatic tyres and Clough Smith themselves had moved to pneumatic-tyred production in November 1926 with a new LL (for low-loading) model. The company subsequently entered into an arrangement with Karrier to produce the Karrier-Clough trolley omnibus which Clough would market.

Karrier allocated the number E6, to this model. The contract with Karrier ended in 1933, but Clough Smith continued as a manufacturer and supplier of associated electrical equipment and was still active in the field in 1968/69, when the company removed redundant equipment from the Reading system.

The company subsequently diversified into cable and electrical supply, of all types, both in the UK and abroad, as well as railway signalling systems and the installation of one of the earliest fibre-optic systems for Mercury Communications which was laid alongside British Rail tracks. It specialises in electrical and associated equipment for rail systems.

In April 1990, Clough Smith was purchased by Tilbury. In October 2001, it was rebranded Interserve Rail. It has diversified into facilities management, being awarded a five-year contract to manage 11 Network Rail stations in 2017.

=== Trolleybus chassis ===
- Straker-Clough solid tyred model, chassis Nos. 1–63: Production 1921–1926
- Straker-Clough pneumatic-tyred (LL model)., chassis Nos. 64–93: Production 1926/1927
- Karrier-Clough pneumatic-tyred model, chassis Nos. 54001–44: Production 1927–1932

Of the chassis produced, 66 had bodies produced by Charles H Roe, and the rest used a variety of bodies manufactured by Park Royal, Brush and Dodson.
