= Trolleybuses in George Town, Penang =

George Town trolleybus system
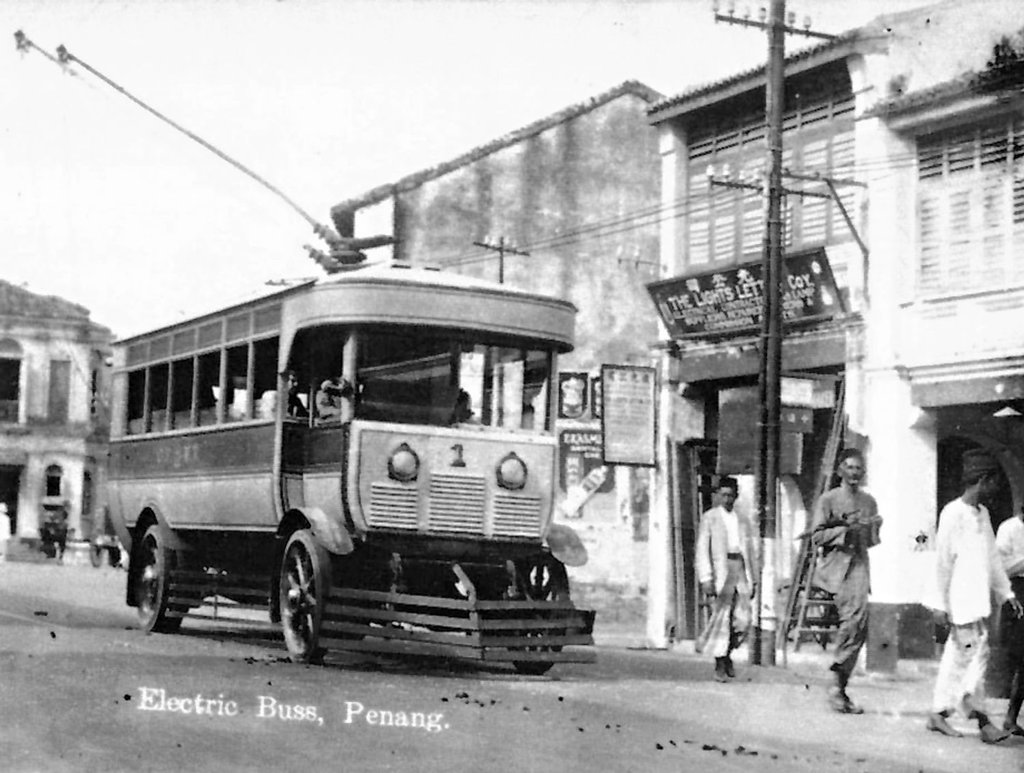
- George Town trolleybus no 1, ca. 1926.

Operation
- Locale: George Town, Penang, British Malaya / Federation of Malaya
- Open: 19 March 1924
- Close: 31 July 1961
- Status: Closed
- Routes: 4
- Operator: George Town Municipal Transport

The George Town trolleybus system was part of the public transport network in George Town, on the island of Penang (part of Malaysia since 1963), for more than 35 years in the mid-20th century.

Opened in 1924, the system gradually replaced the George Town tramway network. It lasted until mid-1961, when it was closed and replaced by a network of motor bus routes. At its peak, the system had four routes.

== History ==
In 1923 a 24-seat Brush bodied Clough, Smith trolleybus was ordered as an experiment, entering service in 1925 on the Magazine Road to Jetty via Chulia Street service. It was followed by a 22-seat Strachans & Brown bodied Thornycroft. In 1926 three trolleybuses were purchased from Ransomes, Sims & Jefferies, who supplied another five in March 1929. Two existing Thornycroft motor buses were converted to trolleybuses in 1929 and 1931, respectively.

In 1934, two nine-seater trolleybuses were purchased specifically for the one mile Penang Hill Railway service from Lower station to the Air Itam main road. A further 18 Ransomes, Sims & Jefferies trolleybuses were delivered in 1935/36. Six more followed in 1938-1940.

By the end of the Japanese occupation of Malaya, the entire fleet was out of service. All were gradually returned to service between 1946 and 1950 except two that were too badly damaged. In the 1950s the original fleet was replaced by 26 Sunbeams and five 1935 built AEC 664T double-deckers purchased second-hand from London. The network closed on 31 July 1961.

== Fleet ==
Fleet numbers	Quantity	Chassis	Body	Configuration	In service
1	1	Clough, Smith	Brush	Two axle, single deck	1925-1952
2	1	Thornycroft	Strachans & Brown	Two axle, single deck	1925-1952
3-10	8	Ransomes, Sims & Jefferies C type	George Town Municipal Transport	Two axle, single deck	1927-1959
11-12	2	Thornycroft	George Town Municipal Transport	Two axle, single deck, converted from motor buses	1929-1953
13-36	24	Ransomes, Sims & Jefferies	George Town Municipal Transport	Two axle, single deck	1935-1959
1A-2A	2	Ransomes, Sims & Jefferies	George Town Municipal Transport	Two axle, single deck	1937-1956
1, 11, 16	3	Sunbeam F4	George Town Municipal Transport	Two axle, single deck	1953-1960
2, 12, 15, 17-19, 25, 26, 51-55	13	Sunbeam MF2B	George Town Municipal Transport	Two axle, single deck	1954-1961
20-24	5	AEC 664T	Metro Cammell Weymann	Three axle, double deck ex London	1956-1959
27-36	10	Sunbeam MF2B	George Town Municipal Transport	Two axle, single deck	1957-1961

== See also ==
- History of Malaysia
- List of trolleybus systems
- Transport in Penang
