= Penang Island Rural District Council =

Defunct local government in the Malaysian state of Penang

- Majlis Daerah Pulau Pinang

Overview
- Established: 1908; 117 years ago (as the Penang Island Rural Board)
- Dissolved: 1971
- Polity: Rural District of Penang Island
- Headquarters: Government Offices (1908–1962); Tuanku Syed Putra Building (1962–1970)

The Penang Island Rural District Council (abbrev. MDPP) was a local government that administered large portions of Penang Island in the Malaysian state of Penang. Established in 1908, the local government was responsible for public health, sanitation, waste management, traffic management, building regulation, social and economic development, and infrastructure in what is now the Southwest District and parts of the Northeast District outside downtown George Town.

The district council became a fully-elected local government after Malaya's independence in 1957. However, the Indonesia–Malaysia confrontation led to a nationwide suspension of local government elections. In 1971, Penang's Chief Minister Lim Chong Eu suspended the district council and transferred its authority to the Chief Minister's Office. Between 1974 and 1976, the district council was merged with the George Town City Council to form the Penang Island Municipal Council (now Penang Island City Council).

== History ==
=== Establishment ===
In 1886, Straits Settlements Governor Frederick Weld formed a committee to amend municipal laws to create separate administrations for rural areas. He contended that the municipality of George Town should not encompass all of Penang Island, as it did at the time. The resulting legislation, known as Ordinance IX, was granted royal assent in 1888. This limited the jurisdiction of the George Town Municipal Commission (which would later evolve into the George Town City Council) to the settlement itself and necessitated the delineation of its municipal boundaries.

Consequently, the island was administratively divided into two. While the George Town Municipal Commission governed the settlement, in 1908, the Penang Island Rural Board was established to administer areas outside George Town's municipal limits. The board included a Collector of Land Revenue, an engineer, a senior medical officer and the district officer for Balik Pulau. Its inaugural meeting took place at the Government Offices on 17 January that year, with W. Peel appointed as the first president of the rural board. By-laws from the George Town Municipal Commission would remain in effect outside the municipal boundaries until they were either repealed or replaced by the rural board.

Although the rural board was responsible for areas outside George Town's municipal boundaries, its meetings were held at the Government Offices within George Town, where the Land Office was situated. This would remain the case throughout the local government's existence. Following the relocation of the Land Office to the nearby Tuanku Syed Putra Building in 1962, rural district council meetings were also shifted to this new facility.

=== Infrastructure development ===
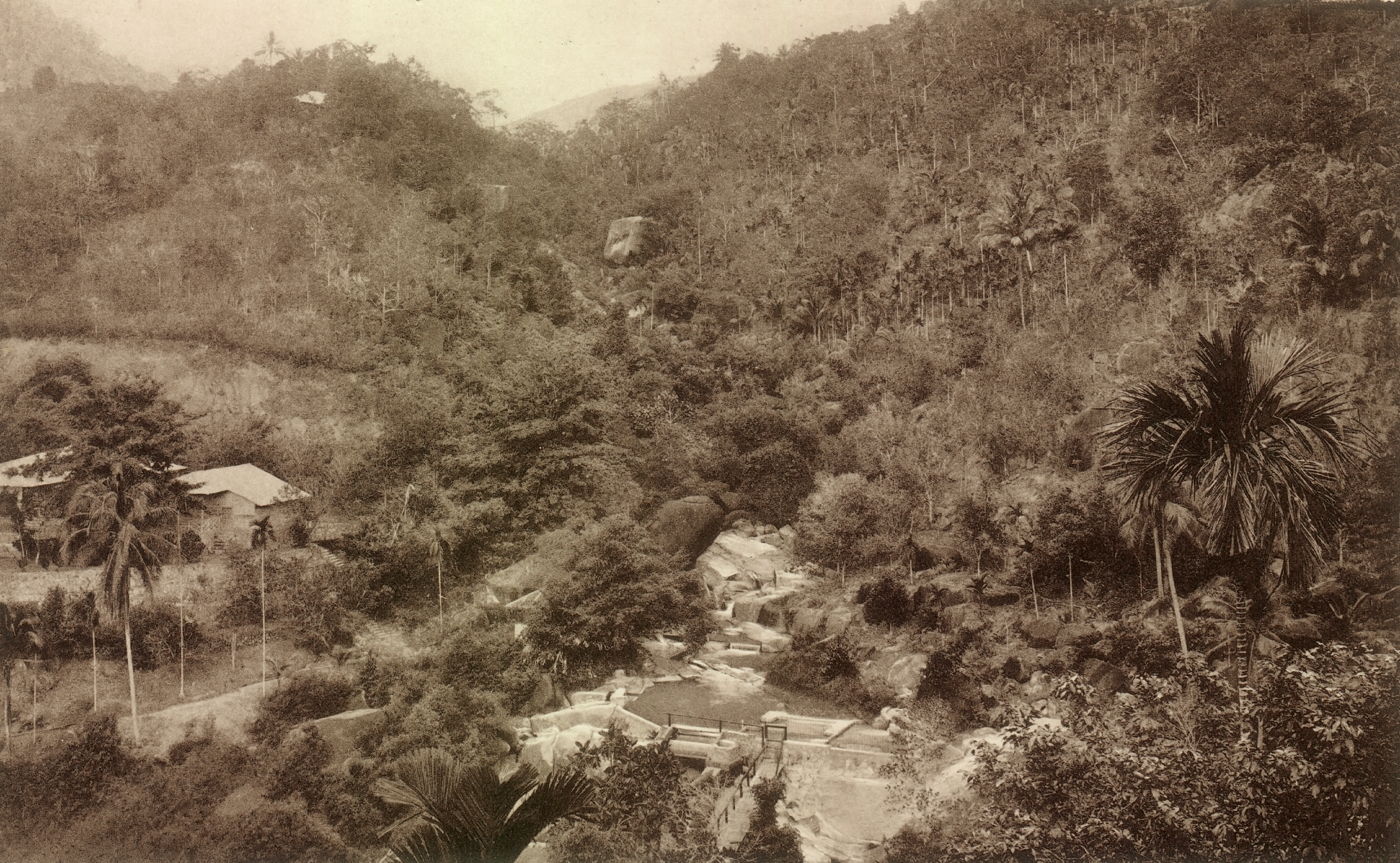
Ayer Itam c. 1910

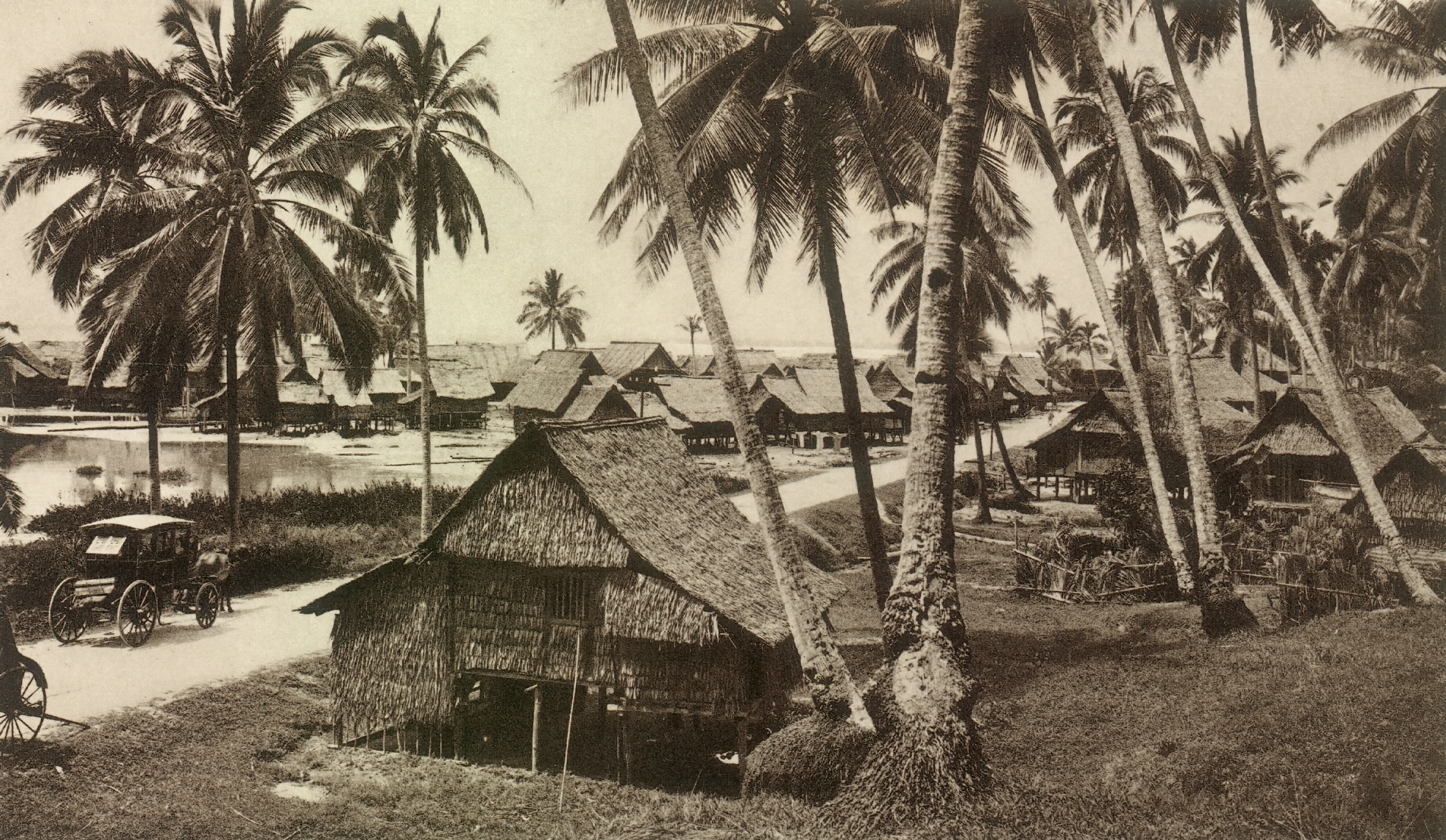
Tanjong Tokong c. 1910

The Penang Island Rural Board held responsibility for water supply outside George Town's municipal limits; in practice however, the northern part of the island utilised shared water infrastructure with downtown George Town. By the 1940s, the George Town Municipal Commission had built water pipelines between the city centre and areas such as Ayer Itam, Batu Ferringhi and Teluk Bahang. Consequently, the Rural Board concentrated on developing a unified water supply system for the southern half of the island.

During the interwar years, areas such as Ayer Itam, Balik Pulau, Bayan Lepas and Teluk Kumbar experienced considerable development. In the 1920s, Ayer Itam was served by a new market and road expansions were being undertaken at Balik Pulau. The establishment of Minden Barracks at Gelugor in the 1930s necessitated the widening of roads connecting downtown George Town and Bayan Lepas, as well as improvements to the water infrastructure to support the military facility. By 1939, the rural board sanctioned the redevelopment of Tanjong Tokong, located just north of George Town's municipal limits.

=== Postwar years ===
In 1949, a proposal was made to expand the George Town's municipal limits through the annexation of Ayer Itam, Gelugor and Tanjong Tokong. This faced opposition from the rural board and public dissent, resulting in its postponement. In the early 1950s, the issue was repeatedly raised, leading to public protests that eventually resulted in the abandonment of the proposal.

The rural board was renamed the Penang Island Rural District Council in 1957. The year also marked the first election for the local government, which saw the Alliance (predecessor of the present-day Barisan Nasional coalition) securing victory in all wards.

=== Suspension and merger ===
In 1965, local government elections were suspended across Malaysia due to the Indonesia–Malaysia confrontation. In the 1969 state election, Gerakan won control of Penang's legislature. Lim Chong Eu took over as Chief Minister, but found it impossible to implement his electoral pledge to reinstate local government elections without the support of the Alliance-controlled federal government, which was forced to impose a nationwide state of emergency following post-election sectarian violence in Kuala Lumpur.

Instead, Lim pursued a restructuring of local governments in Penang. The rural district councils in the state were regarded as inefficient. A 1971 study proposed reorganising Penang into a two-city administration system – one encompassing all of Penang Island and another for Seberang Perai. In December 1970, a suspension order was issued for the Penang Island Rural District Council, taking effect in 1971. Subsequently, the authority of all rural district councils in Penang was consolidated under the Chief Minister's Office.

By 1973, the Malaysian federal government had decided to reorganise local governments nationwide to increase efficiency. In 1974, Lim announced the merger of the Penang Island Rural District Council with the George Town City Council, creating a unified management board for all of Penang Island. In 1976, the federal Parliament enacted the Local Government Act, which mandated the appointment of mayors and councillors by the respective state governments. By year's end, Lim's administration enforced the Act in Penang, reforming the island's management board into the Penang Island Municipal Council (now Penang Island City Council).

== See also ==
- Regional Council (Hong Kong)
