= Maimunah Mohd Sharif =

Malaysian civil servant and urban planner

Yang Berbahagia Dato' Seri Maimunah Mohd Sharif DGPN DPNS DSPN AMN
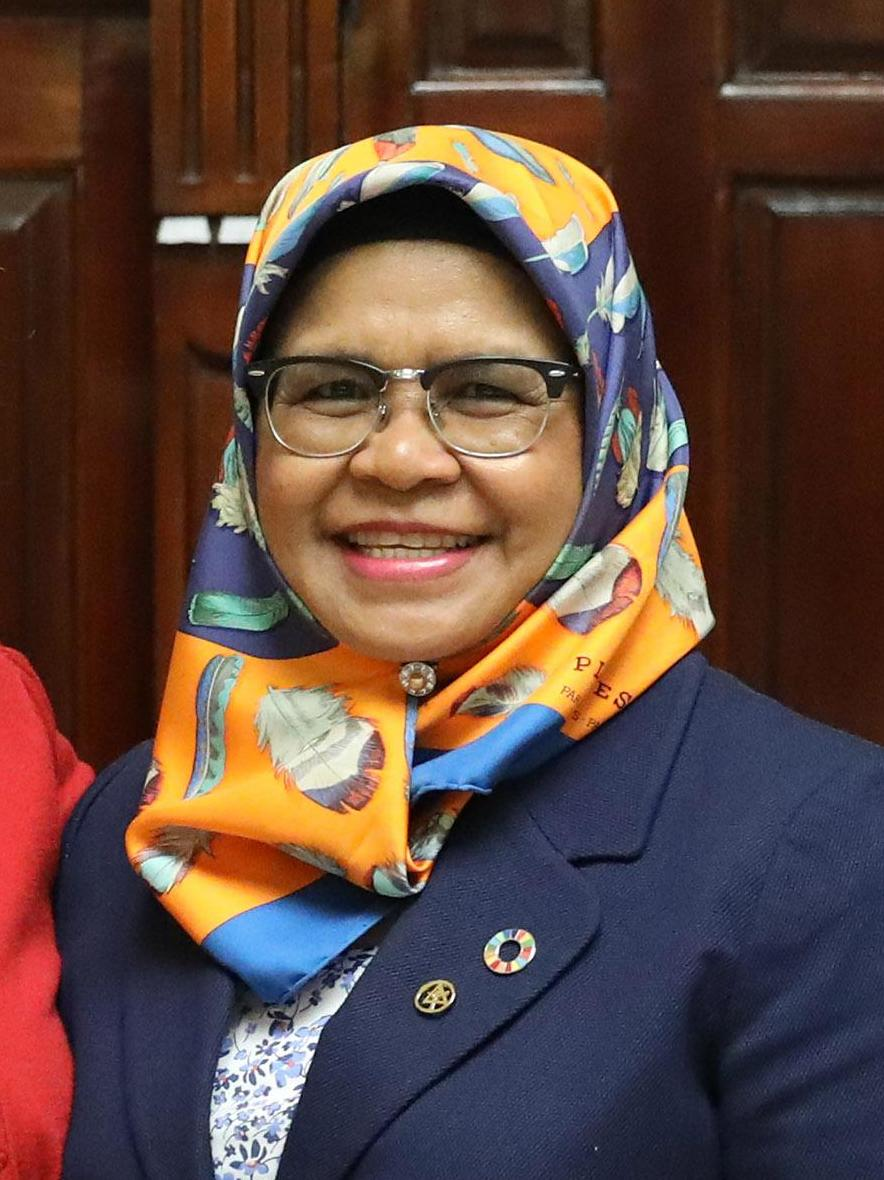
- Maimunah in 2018

15th Mayor of Kuala Lumpur
- In office 15 August 2024 – 14 November 2025
- Preceded by: Kamarulzaman Mat Salleh
- Succeeded by: Fadlun Mak Ujud

Executive Director of the United Nations Human Settlements Programme (UN-Habitat)
- In office 20 January 2018 – 19 January 2024
- Preceded by: Joan Clos
- Succeeded by: Michal Mlynár

Acting Director-General, United Nations Office at Nairobi (UNON)
- In office January 2019 – 8 January 2020
- Preceded by: Hanna Tetteh
- Succeeded by: Zainab Bangura

Mayor of Penang Island
- In office 1 July 2017 – 19 January 2018
- Preceded by: Patahiyah Ismail
- Succeeded by: Yew Tung Seang

Personal details
- Born: Maimunah binti Mohd Sharif; 26 August 1961 (age 64) Kuala Pilah, Negeri Sembilan, Federation of Malaya (now Malaysia)
- Education: Sungai Dua Primary School; Tunku Kurshiah High School
- Alma mater: University of Wales Institute of Science and Technology (BSc); University of Science Malaysia (MSc)
- Occupation: Civil servant
- Profession: Urban planner

Dato' Seri Maimunah binti Mohd Sharif (born 26 August 1961) is a Malaysian civil servant and urban planner who served as the 15th Mayor of Kuala Lumpur from August 2024 until November 2025. She also served as the Executive Director of the United Nations Human Settlements Programme (UN-Habitat) from January 2018 until January 2024, becoming the first Asian woman to serve as Executive Director of UN-Habitat. On 20 January 2022, she was re-elected by the UN General Assembly for a two-year term that ended on 19 January 2024.

From January 2019 to January 2020 she also concurrently served as the acting Director-General of the United Nations Office at Nairobi (UNON). She holds the rank of Under-Secretary-General of the United Nations in the UN System and sits on the United Nations Chief Executives Board for Coordination and the Secretary-General's Senior Management Group.

Prior to her appointment as Executive Director of UN-Habitat, Sharif was the Mayor of Penang Island, Malaysia. Before her appointment as Mayor, she was the President of the Municipal Council of Seberang Perai from 2011, the first woman to be appointed to the position.

== Early life and education ==
Sharif was born and raised in Kuala Pilah, Negeri Sembilan, Malaysia, the daughter of Mohd Sharif bin Idu (father) and Shariah binti Adam (mother), together with four brothers and a sister. She undertook her primary school education at Sungai Dua Primary School and her secondary school education at Tunku Kurshiah High School, Kuala Pilah, Negeri Sembilan.

She attended the University of Wales Institute of Science and Technology and graduated with a Bachelor of Science with Honours in Town Planning Studies. She also holds a Master of Science in Planning Studies from the University of Science Malaysia.

== Career ==
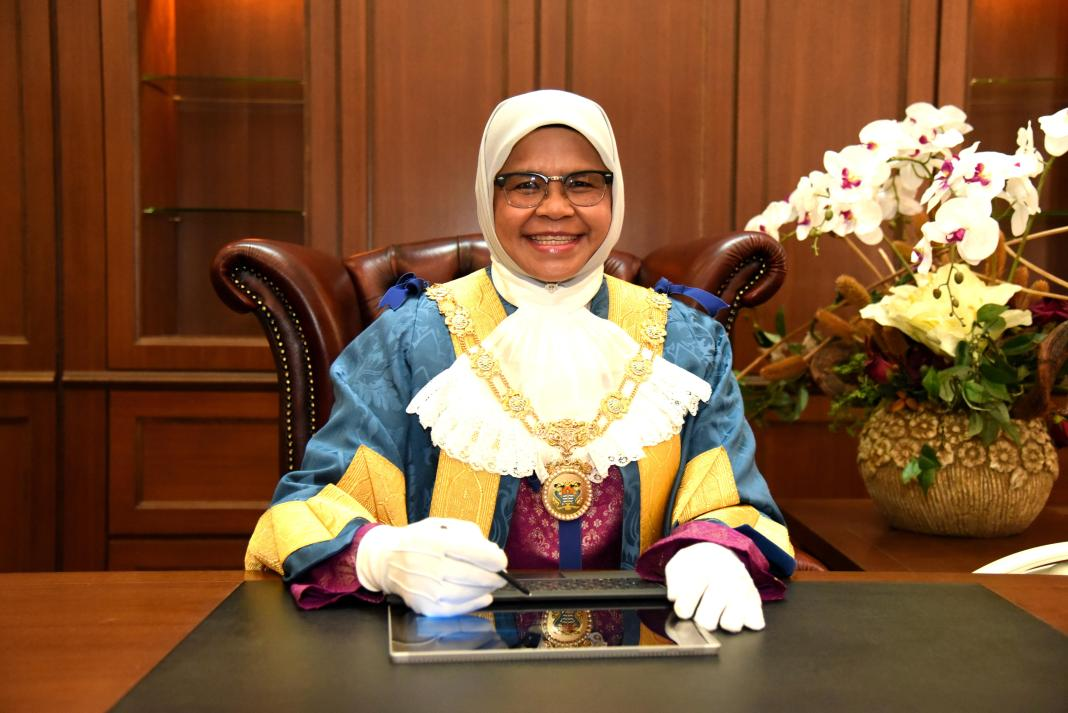
Maimunah Sharif as the Mayor of City Council of Penang Island, Malaysia

Sharif led a team which planned and implemented urban renewal projects in George Town, the capital of the Malaysian island of Penang. In November 2009, as its General Manager, Sharif established George Town World Heritage Incorporated and managed the George Town World Heritage Site, which was inscribed by UNESCO in July 2008. From 2017 to 2018, she served as the mayor of the city council of Penang Island, Malaysia.

Following her nomination by the UN Secretary-General Antonio Guterres, the United Nations General Assembly elected Sharif as the Executive Director of the United Nations Human Settlements Programme UN-Habitat on 22 December 2017. She was appointed by the UN Secretary General António Guterres for a four-year term.

=== With the UN ===
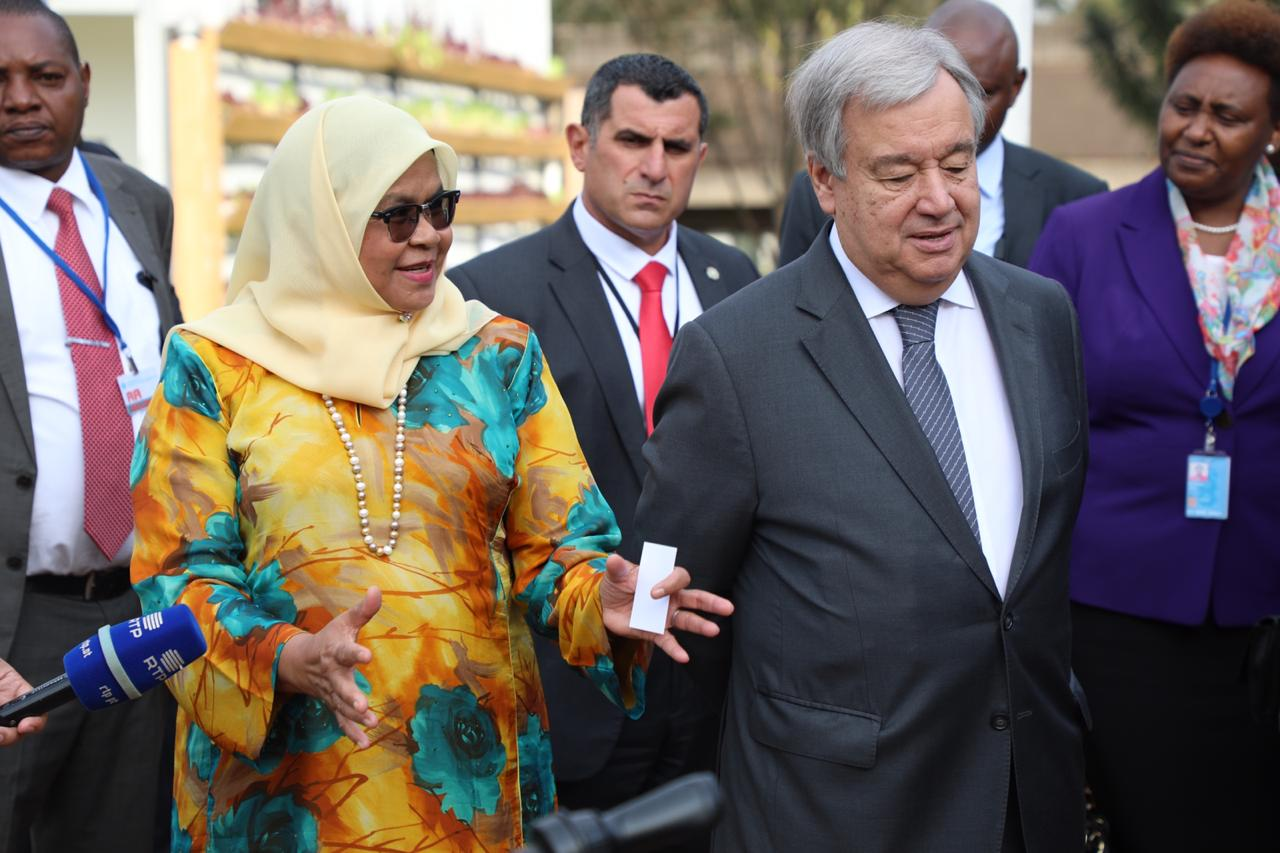
Maimunah Sharif with the UN Secretary-General at the United Nations Office at Nairobi in July 2019

On 22 January 2018, Sharif assumed her post at UN-Habitat's Headquarters in Nairobi, Kenya. She succeeded Joan Clos of Spain. In January 2019 Maimunah Mohd Sharif was designated as the Acting Director-General of the United Nations Office at Nairobi following the appointment of her predecessor, Hanna Tetteh, as Head of the United Nations Office to the African Union in Addis Ababa. She was replaced by incumbent Zainab Bangura, who was appointed on 30 December 2019.

As Executive Director of UN-Habitat Sharif has focused on reforming and rejuvenating the agency, mobilizing for internal and external support for the organization's restructuring and new Strategic Plan 2020–2023. Her efforts seek to transform the organization into an agile and innovative leader on urban issues has been widely appreciated by stakeholders.

Initiatives undertaken by Sharif as Executive Director of UN-Habitat include the adoption of the General Assembly Resolution 73/539 which established a new governance structure for UN-Habitat and initiated an internal restrengthening process.

Sharif is overseeing the initiation of a blueprint for sustainable urban development, which brings together over 24 organizations for a system-wide United Nations strategy on sustainable urbanization.

In May 2019, Sharif headed the first UN-Habitat Assembly in Nairobi. Under the theme, 'Innovation for Better Quality of Life in Cities and Communities', with the sub-theme of 'Accelerated Implementation of the New Urban Agenda towards Achievement of the Sustainable Development Goals', the Assembly brought together UN Member States, UN specialized agencies, local authorities and non-State actors, including civil society, youth and women, the private sector and academia. It established the Executive Board of UN-Habitat and elected its members, reviewed and approved the UN-Habitat Strategic Plan 2020–2023, and reviewed progress in the implementation of the New Urban Agenda (NUA), among other actions.

Sharif presided over the Ninth and Tenth sessions of the World Urban Forum; in Kuala Lumpur, Malaysia (2018) and Abu Dhabi, United Arab Emirates (2020), respectively. Convened by UN-Habitat, the World Urban Forum is the world's premier conference on cities. It was established in 2001 to discuss and examine rapid urbanization and its impact on communities, cities, economies, climate change and policy.

Sharif is known for her people-centred approach to urban planning and she has said that "it is the people within cities that make them the vibrant places that they are. Young women and men flock to cities not for the infrastructure, but for the people and opportunities within that city." She places great importance on inclusivity in cities and works to promote the positions of marginalized individuals and communities, such as women and youth, whom she says are "traditionally left behind in governance, development and participatory processes". She is also a firm believer in positive thinking, saying, "if we practice positive thinking, 50% of the hurdles are solved and remaining 50% to be worked for".

She was succeeded by Anacláudia Rossbach as the Executive Director of UN-Habitat. She took up her position in August 2024.

== Personal life ==
She is married to Adli Lai, and they have two daughters.

== Other activities ==
Sharif is a member of the International Gender Champions, a leadership network launched in 2015 that brings together female and male decision-makers determined to break down gender barriers and make gender equality a working reality in their spheres of influence. Sharif is committed to achieving gender parity at UN-Habitat. She has stated that "gender equality and women’s empowerment are issues very close to my heart. Women and girls are the ‘human face’ of cities and we must have equal opportunities for all and enjoy good quality of life". She is currently one of five Gender Champions based in Nairobi. She was also one of the 24 women whose stories are featured in the book, ‘Step In – True Stories of Women Blasting Barriers, Prepping Pampers and Slaying Stereotypes!’. The book was published in 2022 by Penang Women's Development Corporation and co-edited by Emi Yamazaki, Josephine Yoong and Krista Goon.

== Honours and awards ==
=== Honours of Malaysia ===
- Malaysia
  - Member of the Order of the Defender of the Realm (AMN) (2008)
- Negeri Sembilan
  - Knight Commander of the Order of Loyalty to Negeri Sembilan (DPNS) – Dato' (2020)
- Penang
  - Commander of the Order of the Defender of State (DGPN) – Dato' Seri (2018)
  - Officer of the Order of the Defender of State (DSPN) – Dato' (2014)

=== Awards of Malaysia ===
- Malaysian Institute of Planners - Planner of The Year 2014.
- Malaysia Book of Records, January 2018 - first Asian woman to be appointed as Executive Director of UN-Habitat.

=== International award ===
- Habitat III in Quito - 2016 Global Human Settlements Outstanding Contribution Award

Positions in intergovernmental organisations
| Preceded by (Spain) Joan Clos | Executive Director of the United Nations Human Settlements Programme UN-Habitat; 2018–present | Incumbent |
