= Penang Island City Council =

Local government of George Town in the Malaysian state of Penang

- Majlis Bandaraya Pulau Pinang
- Coat of arms

Overview
- Established: 1976; 50 years ago
- Polity: George Town
- Leader: Mayor Rajendran P. Anthony (since 2023)
- Appointed by: Chief Minister Chow Kon Yeow
- Responsible to: Penang state government
- Annual budget: RM466.31 million (2025)
- Headquarters: City Hall; Esplanade Road; George Town
- Website: www.mbpp.gov.my/en/

The Penang Island City Council (abbrev. MBPP) is the local government that administers the city of George Town, which includes the entirety of Penang Island. The city council, which has jurisdiction over an area of 306 km^{2} (118 mi^{2}), falls under the purview of the Penang state government.

The Penang Island City Council is responsible for urban planning, heritage preservation, public health, sanitation, waste management, traffic management, environmental protection, building control, social and economic development, and general maintenance of urban infrastructure. In addition, the local government, in a joint effort with Rapid Penang, runs a free shuttle bus service within the heart of George Town.

The headquarters of the city government is located within the City Hall in George Town, which had served as the seat of its predecessor, the George Town City Council, until 1974. It also has offices within Komtar, the tallest skyscraper in the city.

== History ==
=== Formation ===
In the 1969 state election, Gerakan, under the leadership of Lim Chong Eu, wrested control of Penang's state legislature from the incumbent Alliance (predecessor to the present-day Barisan Nasional) administration. Lim subsequently became Penang's Chief Minister, replacing Wong Pow Nee. Lim had pledged to restore municipal elections, which had been suspended since 1965 due to the Indonesia–Malaysia confrontation. However, he soon recognised its futility without support from the Alliance-controlled federal government, which had to impose a nationwide state of emergency following post-election sectarian violence in Kuala Lumpur.

At the time, Penang Island was governed by two separate local governments – the George Town City Council and the Penang Island Rural District Council. In lieu of holding local government elections, Lim decided on a massive restructuring of local governments within Penang. The rural district councils were perceived as ineffective and a study conducted in 1971 recommended the consolidation of the two local governments on the island to form a single, unified city government. In addition, by the 1970s, the George Town City Council faced financial difficulties. Despite this, the city government still maintained a skilled workforce, which Lim considered advantageous for a potential municipal merger.

In 1973, the federal government initiated a restructuring of local governments nationwide to enhance efficiency. By then, Gerakan became a member of the newly-formed Barisan Nasional (BN) coalition, ensuring Penang's integration into national development policies. In 1974, Lim announced the merger of the George Town City Council with the Penang Island Rural District Council, creating a unified management board for the entirety of Penang Island. This board consisted of 34 members, including appointed representatives of the BN coalition, civil servants and technocrats.

While the new management board was perceived to be subordinate to the Penang state government, differences soon emerged over the proposed redevelopment of the city centre. This redevelopment entailed the construction of a new complex (what is now Komtar), designed to integrate state and local government services, and improve traffic dispersal in the area. Although the project initially came under the management board's purview, the Penang Development Corporation (PDC), a state statutory board, later asserted control over the project. This led to tensions between Lim's administration and the board, which were further exacerbated by partisanship between members of the board affiliated with Gerakan and the United Malays National Organisation (UMNO), the largest party within BN.

In 1976, the federal Parliament enacted the Local Government Act, which mandated the appointment of mayors and councillors by the respective state governments, contrary to the recommendations of a royal commission advocating for the restoration of local government elections. By the end of that year, Lim's administration implemented the Act in Penang, transforming the island's management board into the Penang Island Municipal Council. The new local government consisted of eight councillors and a president. Among the councillors, two were former members of the defunct board, four were appointed by Gerakan, one was from UMNO and one was an independent member.

With the establishment of the municipal council, Toh Ah Bah, who previously headed the management board, took on the role of president of the new council. The hasty establishment of the local government also contributed to reducing opposition to the urban redevelopment project.

=== Reinstatement of city status ===
The decades that followed the formation of the Penang Island Municipal Council saw a prolonged debate on George Town's city status, which had been granted by Queen Elizabeth II in 1957. Clause 3 of the Local Government (Merger of the City Council of George Town and the Rural District Council of Penang Island) Order, 1974, stated that

"the status of the City of George Town as a city shall continue to be preserved and maintained and shall remain unimpaired by the merger hereby effected".

However, the BN-controlled federal government was of the view that George Town had effectively lost its city status. In contrast, Penangites contended that George Town's city status was never revoked. Activist Anwar Fazal asserted that George Town "legally has been and is still a city because the City of George Town Ordinance 1957 was never repealed". Following the 2008 state election that resulted in Pakatan Rakyat (predecessor to the present-day Pakatan Harapan coalition) coming to power in Penang, the issue of George Town's city status reignited tensions between the federal and Penang state governments.

In 2015, George Town's jurisdiction was expanded by the federal government to encompass the entirety of Penang Island and the surrounding islets. The Penang Island Municipal Council was thus renamed the Penang Island City Council. Patahiyah Ismail was appointed as the new Mayor of Penang Island, the first female mayor in the city's history. The expansion also resulted in an enlargement of the city council's workforce and responsibilities, as well as enhancing the regulation of heritage conservation.

== List of mayors ==
#	Name of Mayors	Term start	Term end
1	Patahiyah Ismail	31 March 2015	30 June 2017
2	Maimunah Mohd Sharif	1 July 2017	19 January 2018
3	Yew Tung Seang	20 January 2018	5 May 2023
4	Rajendran P. Anthony	6 May 2023	

== Organisation ==
Majlis Bandaraya Pulau Pinang

Type
- Type: unicameral
- Established: 2015

Leadership
- Mayor: Rajendran P. Anthony since 6 May 2023

Structure
- Seats: 24
- Political groups: (As of 1 January 2026) PH (22): DAP (10); PKR (8); AMANAH (4); BN (1): UMNO (1); NGO (1)

Meeting place
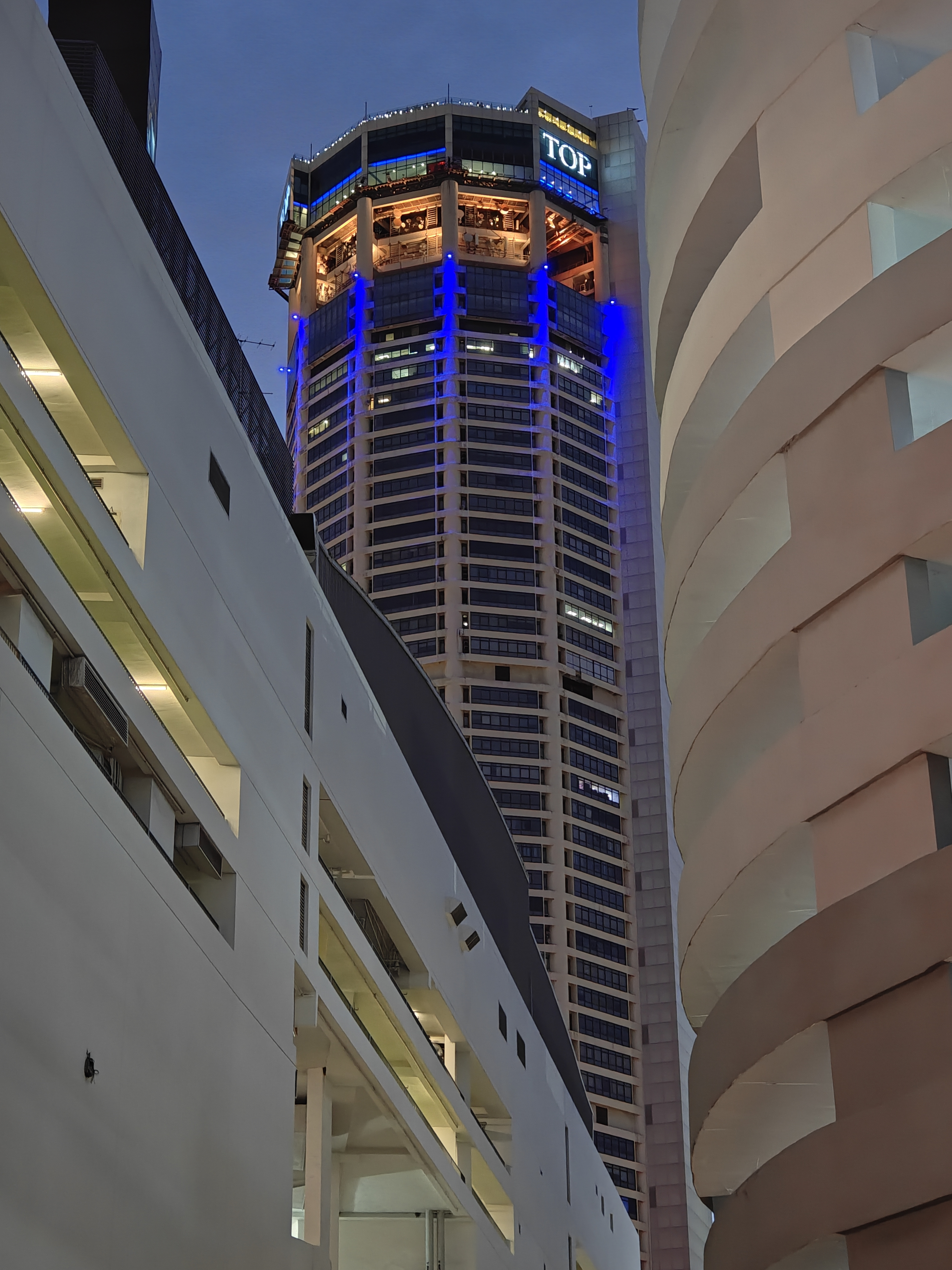
- Kompleks Tun Abdul Razak building

The city council is headed by the Mayor of Penang Island, who is assisted by the City Secretary and 24 councillors. The mayor's term lasts for two years, while each of the 24 councillors is appointed for a one-year term by the Penang state government.

22 of the councillors are selected by the component parties of the ruling Pakatan Harapan (PH) coalition. Of these, 10 are appointed by the Democratic Action Party (DAP), eight by the People's Justice Party (PKR) and four from the National Trust Party (Amanah). Following the 2023 state election that saw the United Malays National Organisation (UMNO) forming an unprecedented political alliance with PH, the former is allocated one councillor post as well. Penang-based non-governmental organisations (NGOs) are allocated the remaining councillor post to allow for the participation in policy-making by civil societies.

The current mayor of Penang Island is Rajendran P. Anthony, who assumed office in 2023, whilst Cheong Chee Hong holds the positions of City Secretary and chief digital officer.

=== Councillors ===
As of January 2025, the councillors of the Penang Island City Council are as listed below.

Councillor	Political Affiliation
Abdul Razak Abdul Rahman	UMNO
Alan Lim Wei Lun	DAP
Benji Ang Ming Quan	DAP
Chan Soon Aun	PKR
David Chen Wooi Teong	Penang Chinese Chamber of Commerce
Hari Krishnan Ramakrishnan	PKR
Koay Gaik Kee	DAP
Lee Seng Hwai	DAP
Lee Wei Seang	DAP
Mohamad Khairani Abd. Shukor	Amanah
Muhamad Khairul Mohd. Ali	Amanah
Mohd Roshidi Roslan	PKR
Mohd Suhairi Arumugam Abdullah	PKR
Mohamed Yusoff Mohamed Noor	Amanah
Nurhidayah Che Rose	PKR
Ooi Mei Mei	PKR
Rohaizat Hamid	DAP
Shafiz Rahim Raja	PKR
Shahul Hameed MK Mohamed Ishack	PKR
T. Visvenathan	DAP
Tan Soo Siang	DAP
Theng Jie Wey	DAP
Vickneson Rajendran	DAP
Zuraida Mohd. Arshad	Amanah

=== Departments ===
The internal organisation of the city council comprises the following departments and units.

Department And Unit	Director
Building Control	Rizuwan Salleh
Commissioner of Building	Nurul Azian Mohd Nordin
Corporate and Community Relations	Muhammad Muashraf Mohamed
Development Coordination Unit	Syawal Abul Haq Ahmad Jelani
Engineering	Cheah Chin Kooi
Health & Environment	Chin Wei Loon
Heritage Conservation	Lee Tit Kun
Integrity Unit	Rafat Abdulah
Internal Auditing Unit	Janita Thomas Felix
Landscape	Azizul Fahmi Muhamad
Law Enforcement	Noorazrein Noorazlan Ong
Legal Unit	Shamiah Haji Bilal
Licensing	Danny Koay Hock Hsiang
Management Services	Azman Sirun
One Stop Centre Unit	Khairil Khalid
Treasury	Tan Bee Luan
Urban Planning	Mohd Bashir Sulaiman
Urban Services	N/A
Valuation and Property	Normadiah Desa

== Public finance ==
Financial position of the Penang Island City Council, 2020 to 2022
	2020 (RM million)	2021 (RM million)	2022 (RM million)
Revenue	383.6	378.4	380.8
Expenditure	382.0	381.6	369.9
Surplus/deficit	1.6	-3.2	11.0

== See also ==
- Seberang Perai City Council
