= Penang Chinese Chamber of Commerce =

First Chinese Chamber of Commerce in Malaysia

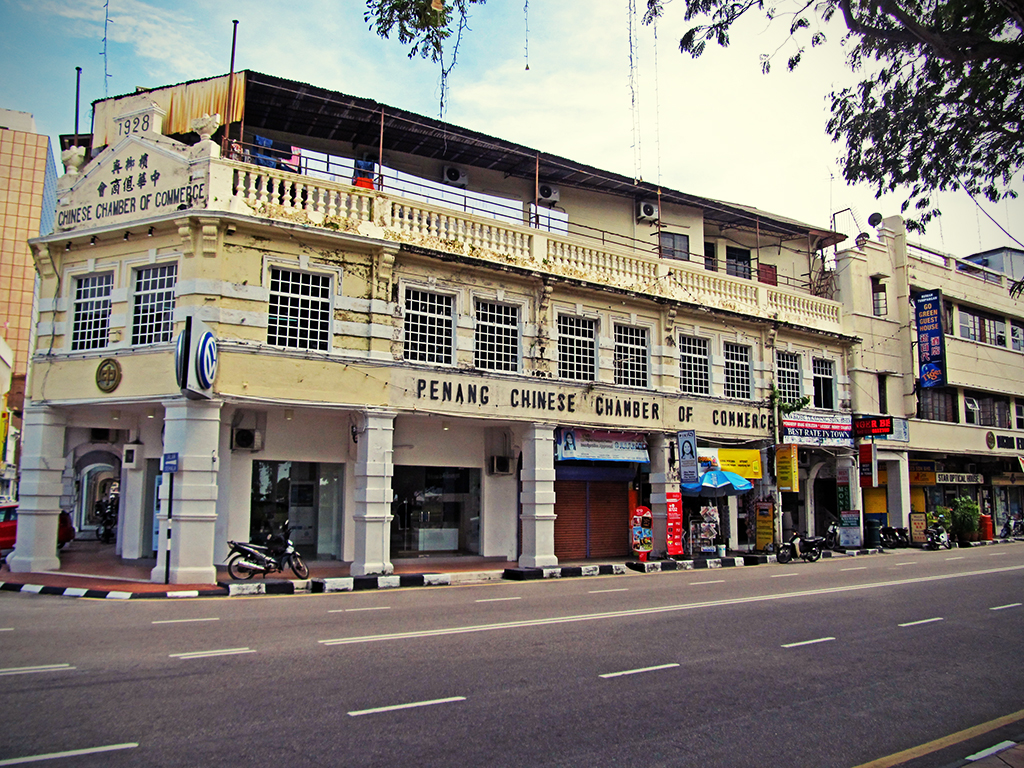
Penang Chinese Chamber of Commerce

The Penang Chinese Chamber of Commerce (Chinese: 檳州中华总商会), established in June 1903, was the first Chinese Chamber of Commerce in Malaya.

== History ==
Established in 1903, the Penang Chinese Chamber of Commerce (PCCC) was one of the pioneer trade organizations founded at the turn of the twentieth century in this region.

A 1908 article gives an idea of the early history of the Chamber:

Among prominent mercantile houses of Pinang there are many conducted by Chinese who follow closely and successfully the methods of Western competitors. As might be expected, the proprietors of these establishments have been quick to recognise the value and importance of an organisation for the protection of their common interests. In June, 1903, they founded the Pinang Chinese Chamber of Commerce and Agriculture. This institution has a membership representing about a hundred firms, and is open to Chinese merchants, traders, agents and others interested in the commerce and agriculture of the settlement. The object of its promoters is not only the protection of common trade interests, but also the collection and classification of mercantile information and the establishment of a court of arbitration to adjust commercial differences. The offices of the Chamber are in the Tin Exchange Rooms. The office-holders are Mr. Lim Kek Chuan (林克全), president; Mr. Leong Lok Hing (梁樂卿), vice-president; Mr. Yeow Paik Tat, treasurer; and Mr. Kaw Cheng Sian (辜禎善), secretary. The committee is composed of Messrs Quah Beng Kee (柯孟淇), Goh Boon Keng (吳文景), Goh Say Eng (吳世榮), Oon Boon Tan (溫文旦), Lim Seng Hooi (林成輝), Ong Hun Chong (王漢宗), Khaw Joo Tok (許如琢), Lo Poey Chee (羅培芝), Ng See Sin (吳時信), Chung Thye Phin (鄭大平), Oh Ah Min (胡亚明，original name 胡初梅), Yeap Yin Khye.

In January 1946 the British Military Administration decided to end Penang's duty-free status. That, together with the plan to break up the Straits Settlements and impose the Malayan Union, prompted the Penang Chinese Chamber of Commerce to lead a protest of Penang's chambers of commerce including the Penang Indian Chamber of Commerce and the Penang Muslim Chamber of Commerce. The protests aimed at the Colonial Office proved successful, and Penang's free port status was restored in June 1946.

Around 1948 The Penang Chinese Chamber of Commerce donated 7,770 Straits dollars for the establishment of a Chinese consulate which was eventually closed in January 1950.

The Chamber, now one of the strongest commercial institutions in Malaysia in terms of membership and organizational and functional characteristics, is well recognized by both the public and private sectors. In 2003, the Registrar of Society of Malaysia (ROS) presented the Award Certificate of Excellent Society to the Chamber. It has also been awarded the ISO 9001:2000 Quality Management System (QMS) Certificate in March 2006.

== Objectives ==
- To improve and develop trade and industry.
- To collect, collate, and disseminate commercial information and to issue certificates of authentication.
- To arbitrate and settle trade and industrial disputes.
- To collect and compile trade statistics.
- To organize trade exhibitions, seminars, and human resource development programs either on its own or in collaboration with other institution(s).
- To support charitable, cultural, and educational institutions.

== Membership ==
The Chamber now has more than a thousand members composed of individuals and corporations as well as commercial associations and trade guilds. The members of PCCC are from various business sectors, including enterprises, financial institutions, listed companies, housing & construction, garments & textiles, sole agents & retailers.

== Organization ==
Policy formulation and decision-making at the highest level of PCCC are vested in a 51-member General Committee headed by a president and assisted by a deputy president and 3 vice presidents. A 14-member Executive Committee elected from the ranks of the General Committee meets regularly to supervise the implementation of the policies and strategies formulated and planned by the latter, while a permanent Secretariat takes charge of the day-to-day running of the Chamber's affairs.

There are 9 working committees and 3 ad hoc committees charged with various specific functional topics such as small and medium enterprises & human resources development, economics, finance & taxation, housing & construction, infrastructure & public facilities, information technology, transport, logistics & customs, Malaysia-China business development, tourism, etc., all geared towards complementing the Chamber's important role as a conduit for the exchange of views and information between the authorities and business community and in promoting the interest of its members in particular and the economic well-being of the country in general.

== Links ==
The Chamber has close ties with the government at the regional as well as national level through its direct affiliation with the Associated Chinese Chamber of Commerce and Industry of Malaysia and indirect connection with the National Chamber of Commerce and Industry of Malaysia. PCCC is officially represented at the following public bodies:

- Penang Joint Chambers of Commerce
- National Consultative Panel of the Royal Customs
- Penang Local Government Consultative Forum
- Penang State Committee for Trade & Commerce
- Penang Island & P.W. Municipal Councils
- Trade Promotion Within North Asean Region Committee
- Penang Port Commission
- Penang Port Consultative Committee
- Penang Customs Liaison Committee
- E-Economy Working Group of K-ICT Council
- Penang Road Safety Committee
- Advisory Panel of Penang Heritage Steering Committee
