= Local Government Act 1976 =

Parliament of Malaysia
- Long title: An Act to revise and consolidate the laws relating to local government.
- Citation: Act 171
- Territorial extent: Throughout Malaysia
- Passed by: Dewan Rakyat
- Passed: 18 December 1975
- Passed by: Dewan Negara
- Passed: 20 January 1976
- Royal assent: 18 March 1976
- Commenced: 25 March 1976
- Effective: [See Appendix]

Legislative history

First chamber: Dewan Rakyat
- Bill title: Local Government Bill 1975
- Introduced by: Ong Kee Hui, Minister of Local Government and Housing
- Second reading: 18 December 1975
- Third reading: 18 December 1975

Second chamber: Dewan Negara
- Bill title: Local Government Bill 1975
- Member(s) in charge: Ong Kee Hui, Minister of Local Government and Housing
- First reading: 5 January 1976
- Second reading: 19 January 1976
- Third reading: 20 January 1976

Amended by
- Malaysian Currency (Ringgit) Act 1975 [Act 160] Local Government (Amendment) Act 1978 [Act A436] Local Government (Amendment) Act 1983 [Act A564] Fire Services Act 1988 [Act 341] Local Government (Amendment) Act 1991 [Act A806] Local Government (Amendment) Act 1993 [Act A865] Local Government (Amendment) Act 2007 [Act A1131]

Related legislation
- Town Boards Enactment of the F.M.S. [Cap. 137] Town Boards Enactment of Johore [No. 118] Town Boards Enactment of Trengganu [Cap. 64. 3/1955] Municipal Enactment of Kelantan [No. 20 of 1938] Municipal Ordinance of Straits Settlements [Cap. 133] Local Councils Ordinance 1952; Local Government (Temporary Provisions) Act 1973 [Act 124]

Keywords
- Local government
- Status: In force

The Local Government Act 1976 (Malay: Akta Kerajaan Tempatan 1976) is an Act of the Parliament of Malaysia, which was enacted to revise and consolidate the laws relating to local government.

== Preamble ==
WHEREAS it is expedient for the purpose only of ensuring uniformity of law and policy to make a law with respect to local government:

== Structure ==
The Local Government Act 1976, in its current form (1 December 2012), consists of 16 Parts containing 166 sections and 2 schedules (including 7 amendments).

- Part I: Preliminary
- Part II: Administration of Local Authorities
- Part III: Officers and Employees of Local Authorities
- Part IV: Conduct of Business
- Part V: General Financial Provisions
- Part VI: Accounts and Audit
- Part VII: Public Places
- Part VIII: Pollution of Streams
- Part IX: Food, Markets, Sanitation and Nuisances
- Part X: Fire Services
- Part XI: Burial Places, Crematoria and Exhumation
- Part XII: Further Powers of Local Authority
- Part XIII: By-Laws
- Part XIV: Miscellaneous
- Part XV: Rating and Valuation
- Part XVI: Special Provisions
- Schedules

== See also ==
- Local Government Act
