= D. S. Ramanathan =

Malaysian politician

- டி. எஸ். ராமநாதன்

1st Mayor of George Town
- In office 1958–1959

Mayor of George Town (2nd Term)
- In office 1959–1960

President of Malaya National Union of Teachers
- In office 1959–1962

Personal details
- Born: 23 December 1908 Jaffna, British Ceylon
- Died: 1973 (aged 64–65) Kuala Lumpur
- Party: Malaysian Indian Congress (1963-); Labour Party of Malaya (1953-1963)
- Spouse: Ruth Vanniasingham

D. S. Ramanathan (Tamil: டி. எஸ். ராமநாதன்) was a Malaysian politician, teacher, unionist, Malayan Army and educationist of Ceylonese origin. He was a member as well as chairman of the Labour Party of Malaya, and subsequently joined the Malaysian Indian Congress. Besides that, Ramanathan also served as the first mayor for the city of George Town, and is credited for his pioneering efforts to set up a university in Penang.

The idea of a university in Penang was first mooted by him in 1959 in the State Assembly and later crystallised when he was nominated chairman of the Penang University Project committee.

The Universiti Sains Malaysia opened in 1969 and is today one of the leading tertiary institutions of learning in Malaysia.

== Biography ==
D. S. Ramanathan was born to a Sri Lanka Tamil family. He later married to Ruth Vanniasingham. He worked as a teacher prior to entering politics.

He joined the Labour Party of Malaya and when in 1956, George Town was the first municipality in the Federation of Malaya to have a fully elected council, he became active in that arena. His time as the mayor of George Town lasted from 1958 to 1960.

He was also elected to the Sungai Pinang state constituency in 1959. However he lost narrowly in his bid to enter Parliament, being defeated by 258 votes by Umno's Ismail Idris in Penang Selatan.

The former teacher, who began his career in Perak, was also concurrently the president of the National Union of Teachers from 1959 to 1962 as well as vice-president of the Malayan Teachers National Congress from 1961-1962.

During that period, he was also an active member of the National Joint Council of Teachers. Even, after finishing his term as mayor, he was appointed as the headmaster of the Penang Pykett Methodist School.

In 1963, Ramanathan leveled allegations of malpractice and misconduct against members of the George Town council, and this triggered his departure from the Labour Party. He first became an independent politician before joining MIC later in the year. In 1964, he defended his Sungai Pinang state seat, albeit representing MIC.

His son John died in 1970 and DS Ramanathan himself died in 1973 in Kuala Lumpur.

His wife Ruth died in December 2015. At the time his surviving children were David, Sarojini Ruth, Peter and Lakhshmi Lucy.

== Memorials ==
=== D. S. Ramanathan Road ===
Scott Road, a small road off Air Rajah Road, has been renamed in honour of Ramanathan.

== Election results ==
Parliament of the Federation of Malaya
Year	Constituency	Candidate	Votes	Pct	Opponent(s)	Votes	Pct	Ballots cast	Majority	Turnout
1959	P035 Penang Selatan	D. S. Ramanathan (LPM)	9,563	42.83%	Ismail Idris (UMNO)	9,821	43.99%	22,328	258	72.72%
1959	P035 Penang Selatan	D. S. Ramanathan (LPM)	9,563	42.83%	Omar Long (PMIP)	2,585	11.58%	22,328	258	72.72%
1959	P035 Penang Selatan	D. S. Ramanathan (LPM)	9,563	42.83%	Mansor (Independent)	359	1.61%	22,328	258	72.72%

Penang State Legislative Assembly
Year	Constituency	Candidate	Votes	Pct	Opponent(s)	Votes	Pct	Ballots cast	Majority	Turnout
1959	S15 Sungai Pinang	D. S. Ramanathan (LPM)	2,991	55.34%	P.U David (MIC)	1,702	31.49%	5,405	1,289	70.49%
1959	S15 Sungai Pinang	D. S. Ramanathan (LPM)	2,991	55.34%	Abdul Jalil (Negara)	643	11.90%	5,405	1,289	70.49%
1964	S15 Sungai Pinang	D. S. Ramanathan (MIC)	4,236	47.25%	Omar Bin Othman (PRM)	3,120	34.80%	8,966	1,116	83.66%
1964	S15 Sungai Pinang	D. S. Ramanathan (MIC)	4,236	47.25%	Lee Sinn Boon (UDP)	1,385	15.45%	8,966	1,116	83.66%
