= SPICE Aquatic Centre =

Aquatic sports facility in the Malaysian state of Penang

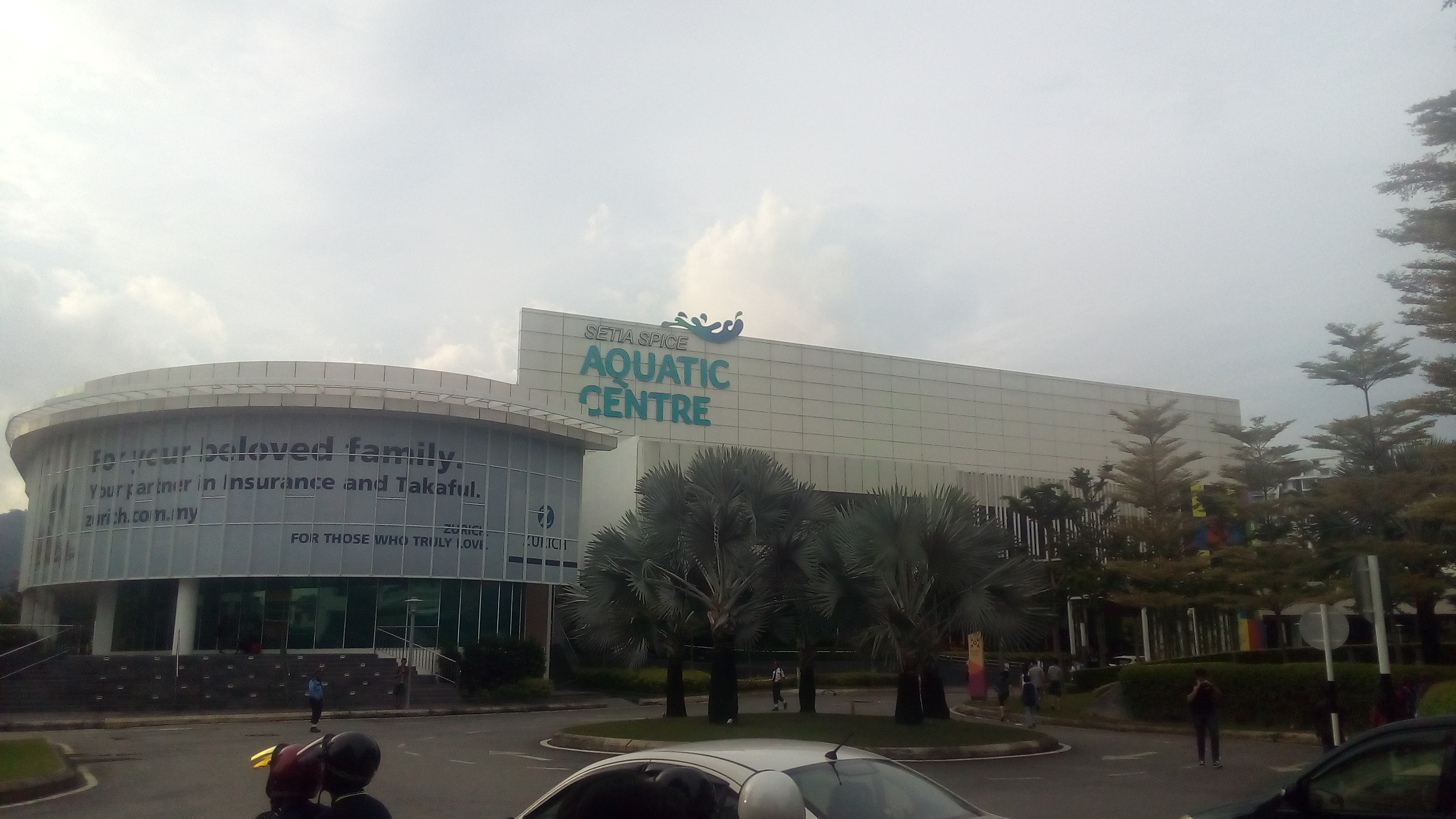
- Interactive map of SPICE Aquatic Centre
- Address: Bayan Lepas; George Town; Malaysia
- Coordinates: 5°19′43″N 100°16′44″E
- Owner: Penang Island City Council
- Operator: S P Setia
- Public transit: 302, 303, 304, 308 401E

Construction
- Opened: 2016; 10 years ago

SPICE Aquatic Centre (Formerly known as PISA Aquatic Centre) is a multipurpose indoor swimming pool in George Town within the Malaysian state of Penang. Situated within the suburb of Bayan Lepas, it was opened in 2016 and forms part of the Setia SPICE complex.

== History ==
In 1997, the 25.4-acre (10.3 ha) Penang International Sports Arena (abbrev. PISA) was built by the Penang Island Municipal Council (now Penang Island City Council) at a cost of RM102.5 million. The complex included an indoor sports arena and an aquatics centre. PISA served as a venue for the 2000 Sukma Games and the 2001 SEA Games. However, design deficiencies and maintenance issues soon led to the closure of the aquatics centre in the years following the events. The municipal government estimated a budget of RM25 million to repair the facilities.

After the 2008 state election, the new Pakatan Rakyat-led state government initiated a request for proposal to redevelop PISA. In 2011, Malaysian property developer S P Setia obtained a 30-year concession from the municipal government to rebuild and operate the complex, which was subsequently renamed Setia SPICE. The redevelopment project was estimated at RM300 million, but the municipal government was only required to contribute a nett amount of RM11.5 million due to cost savings from the open tender process. In addition, S P Setia received planning approval to build Setia V Residences at Gurney Drive, as part of an additional 1,500 residential units exceeding the density limit of its existing and future projects in the state.

The SPICE Aquatic Centre, which opened to the public in 2016, was constructed at a cost of RM16 million. The facility contains a 50 m (160 ft) Olympic-size saltwater swimming pool and a 1.35 m (4 ft 5 in) deep diving pool, diving platforms, function rooms, a gym, a sports clinic, and amenities catering for indoor sports such as badminton and squash. A RM4 million rooftop photovoltaic system, touted as the largest in Penang, extends from the centre to the adjoining SPICE Canopy and is capable of generating up to 980 MW (1,310,000 hp) annually. The centre serves as a training facility for Penang state athletes preparing for the biennial Sukma Games.
