= Setia SPICE =

Sports complex in George Town, Penang, Malaysia

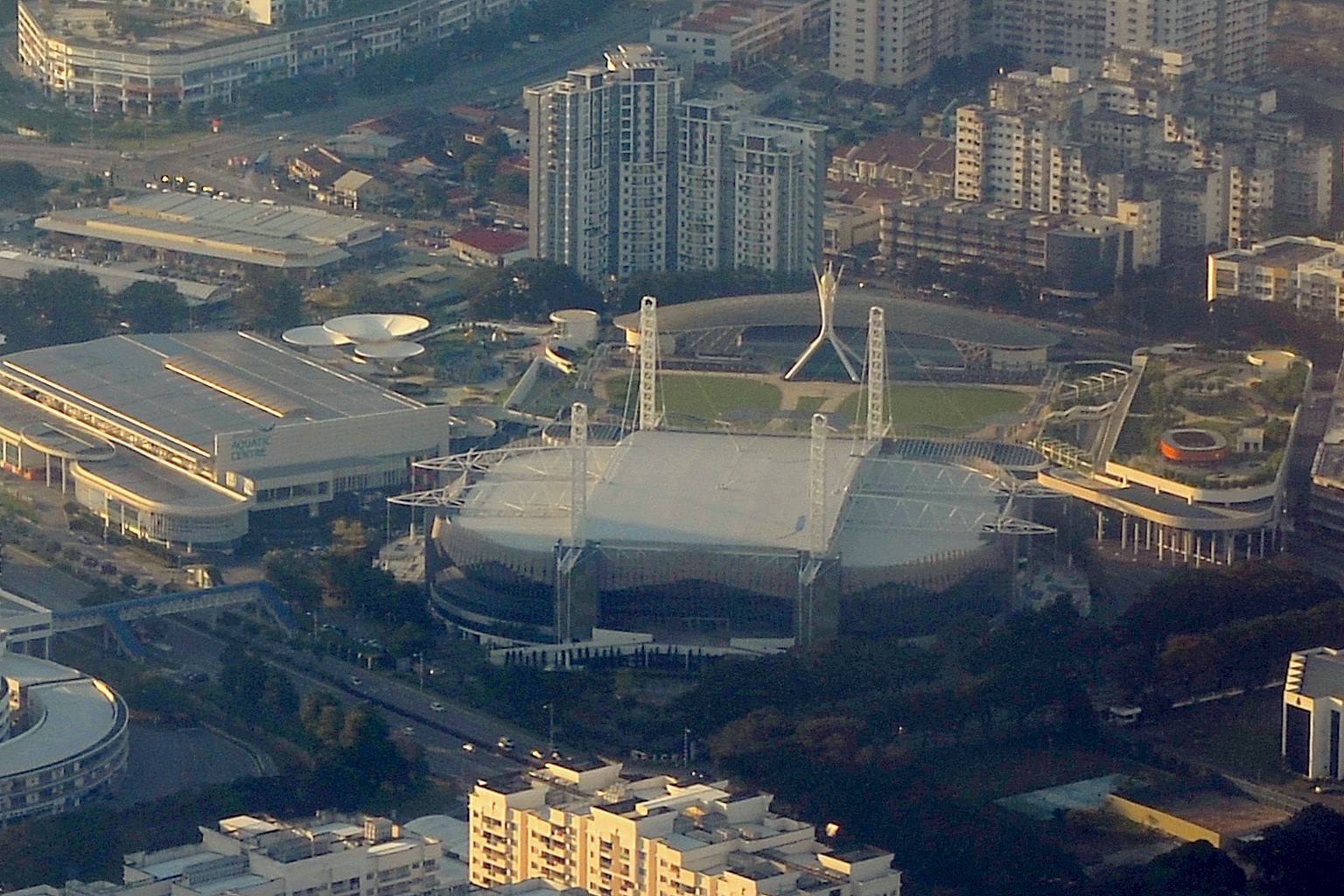

- Location within George Town in Penang
- Interactive map of Setia SPICE
- Former names: Penang International Sports Arena
- Location: Bayan Lepas, George Town, Penang, Malaysia
- Coordinates: 5°19′43″N 100°16′48″E
- Owner: Penang Island City Council
- Operator: S P Setia
- Type: Indoor games and sports, swimming and business events
- Public transit: 302, 303, 304, 308 401E

Construction
- Built: 1997; 29 years ago
- Opened: 1997; 29 years ago
- Renovated: 2022; 4 years ago

Website
- spsetia.com/en-us/venues/setia-spice/home

Setia SPICE is a multipurpose sports complex in George Town within the Malaysian state of Penang. It occupies an area of 25.4 acres (10.3 ha) within the suburb of Bayan Lepas, comprising five components – SPICE Arena (formerly named Penang International Sports Arena, abbrev. PISA), SPICE Convention Centre, SPICE Aquatic Centre, SPICE Canopy and a hotel. The GBI-certified complex is George Town's main indoor sports centre and serves as a major venue for business events.

Completed in 1997, PISA was one of the venues for the 2001 SEA Games. However, it was plagued with issues related to poor design and maintenance. In 2011, a RM300 million project to redevelop the centre was awarded to Malaysian property developer S P Setia. The other components were subsequently built, with the final element, the hotel, completed in 2022.

== History ==
Proposals for an indoor sports arena at Bayan Lepas had been mooted in the early 1990s, leading to the construction of PISA by the Penang Island Municipal Council (now Penang Island City Council) at a cost of RM102.5 million. Completed in November 1997, PISA included an indoor sports arena and aquatics centre. Local company Maxifield was appointed as the operator of the complex.

Design deficiencies emerged shortly after completion, prompting Maxifield to spend RM4 million on upgrades prior to the 2000 Sukma Games. Following financial difficulties, Penevents took over as the operator in 1999, but poor design issues persisted. PISA hosted events in the 2001 SEA Games, yet afterwards fell into disrepair. By 2011, the municipal government estimated that RM25 million was needed for extensive repairs.

=== Renovation ===
In the 2008 state election, Pakatan Rakyat (predecessor to the present-day Pakatan Harapan coalition) seized power from the incumbent Barisan Nasional administration. Recognising the need to diversify the state's economy through the construction of an international convention centre, in 2009 the new state government initiated a request for proposal to redevelop PISA. At the time, the municipal government lacked the capital to undertake the redevelopment project independently. Chief Minister Lim Guan Eng noted that although PISA had been completed in 1997, its true value remained unknown and that Penevents was only beginning to break even in terms of revenue. Lim's administration sought an open tender process to assess PISA's valuation and to appoint a new operator for the facility.

One of the requirements for the tender was to maintain the acreage of greenery at the complex. Malaysian property developer S P Setia proposed a design that featured a new subterranean convention centre covered by a layer of grass, alongside a playground and a spice garden. In 2011, S P Setia obtained a 30-year concession from the municipal government to build and operate the complex, which was renamed Setia SPICE. The redevelopment project was valued at RM300 million; however, due to cost savings from the open tender process, the municipal government was only obligated to invest a nett amount of RM11.5 million. In return, S P Setia was subsequently granted planning approval to build Setia V Residences at Gurney Drive, as part of an additional 1,500 residential units exceeding the density limit of its existing and future projects in the state.

SPICE Canopy was the first component of the project to be completed in 2015. In the following year, upgrading works for SPICE Arena and the SPICE Aquatic Centre were finished. The SPICE Convention Centre opened in 2017. Amari SPICE Hotel, the final component, was operational by 2022. Excluding the hotel, the GBI-certified Setia SPICE complex had a gross development value of RM400 million.

== Components ==
=== SPICE Arena ===
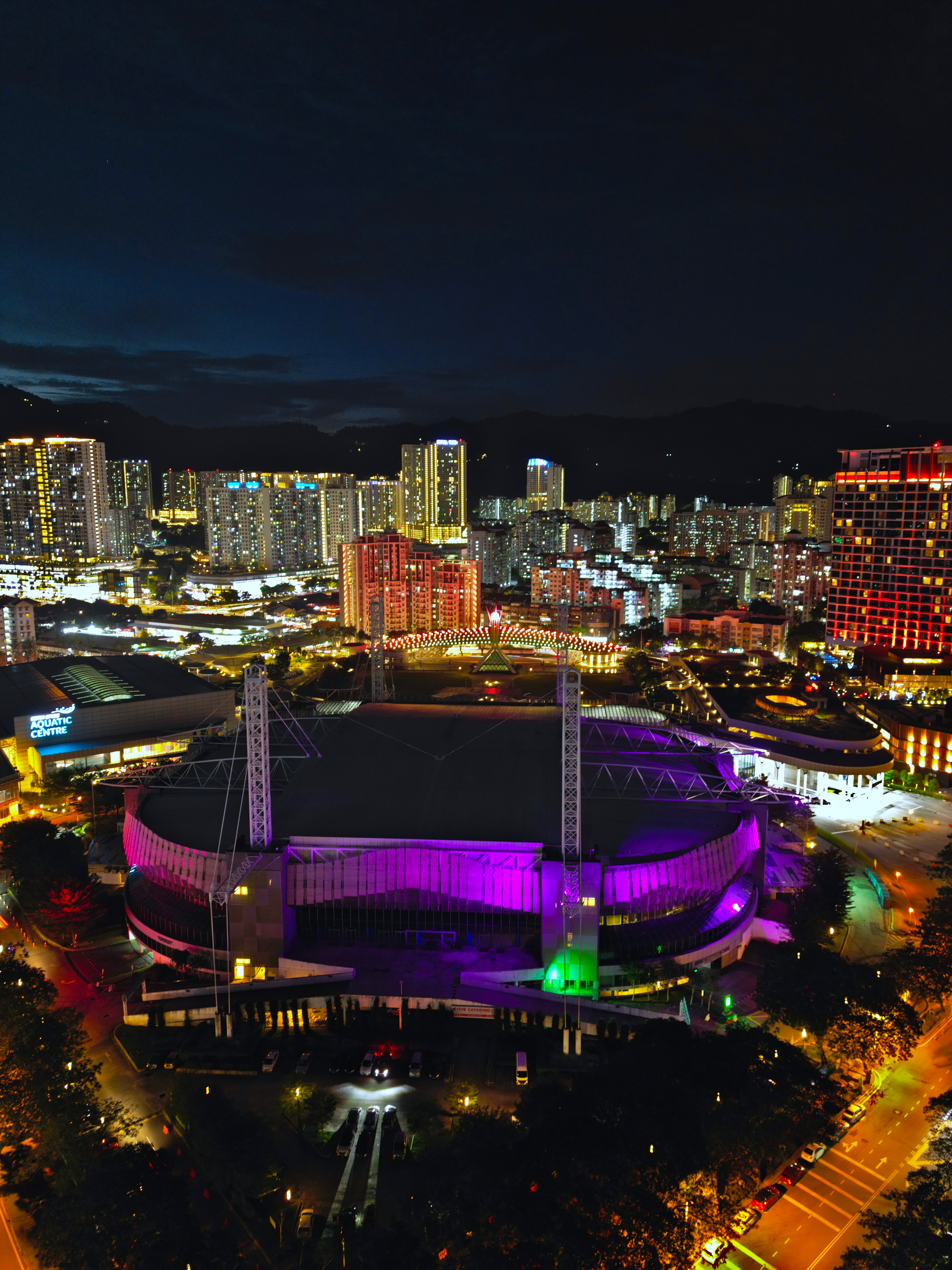
SPICE Arena at night

Formerly named PISA, SPICE Arena is a multipurpose indoor sports arena containing an event space of 80,000 sq ft (7,400 m^{2}). It is touted as the largest of its kind in northern Malaysia, with a maximum capacity of 18,000. Renovations between 2011 and 2016 included upgrades to the roof, façade, and air conditioning, chiller and surveillance systems. A covered walkway connects the arena to the SPICE Convention Centre.

=== SPICE Convention Centre ===
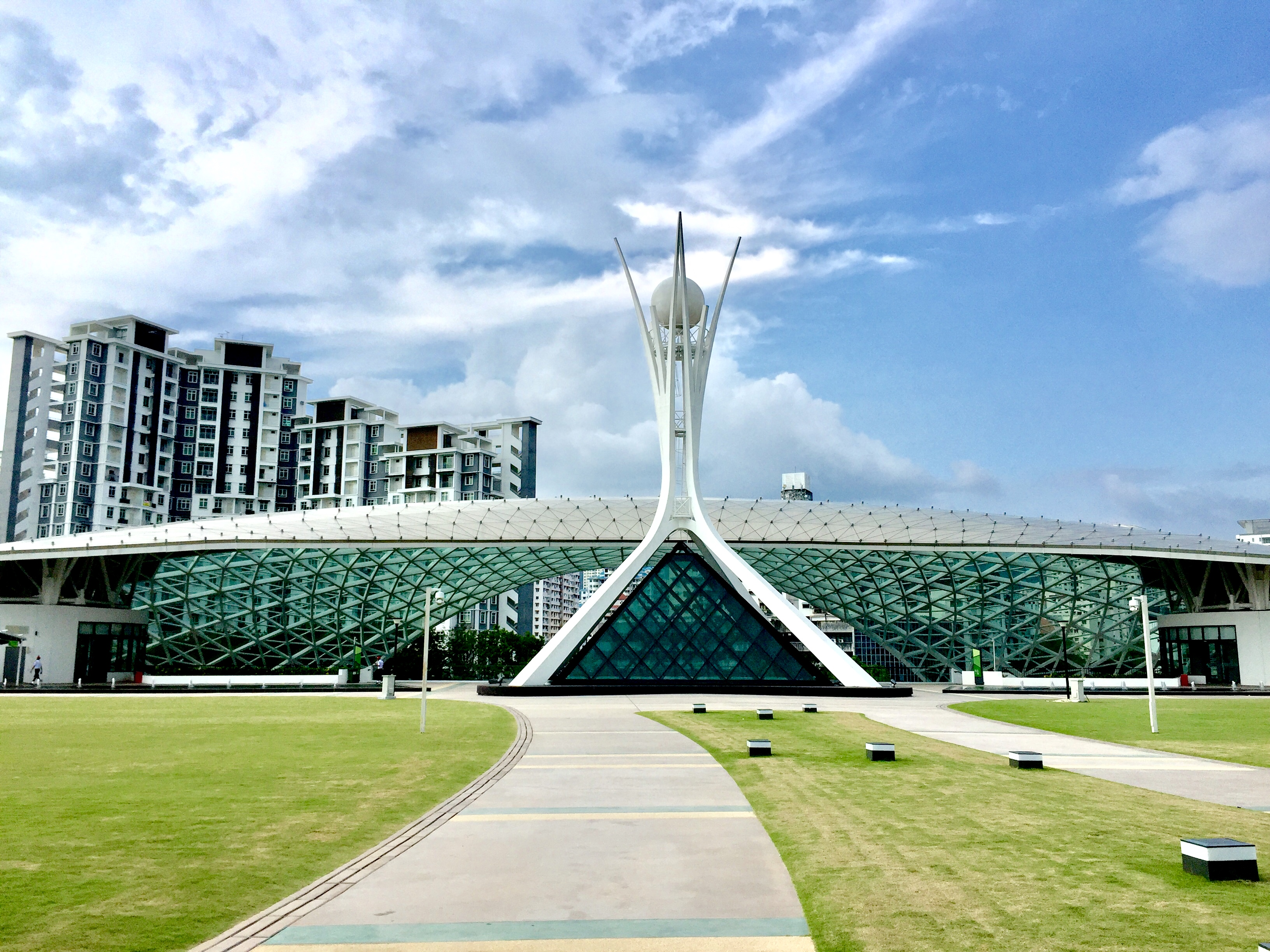
SPICE Convention Centre

Opened in 2017, the SPICE Convention Centre is an underground convention centre containing an event space of 78,959 m^{2} (849,910 sq ft), the largest of all convention centres in Penang. Its design was developed by Arup Group, which incorporated the concept of creating convention spaces underground while transforming the roof into a public garden. The SPICE Convention Centre is recognised as the first hybrid solar-powered meeting venue in the world, equipped with a roof adorned by 654 light-emitting diodes (LEDs) and daylighting features.

=== SPICE Aquatic Centre ===
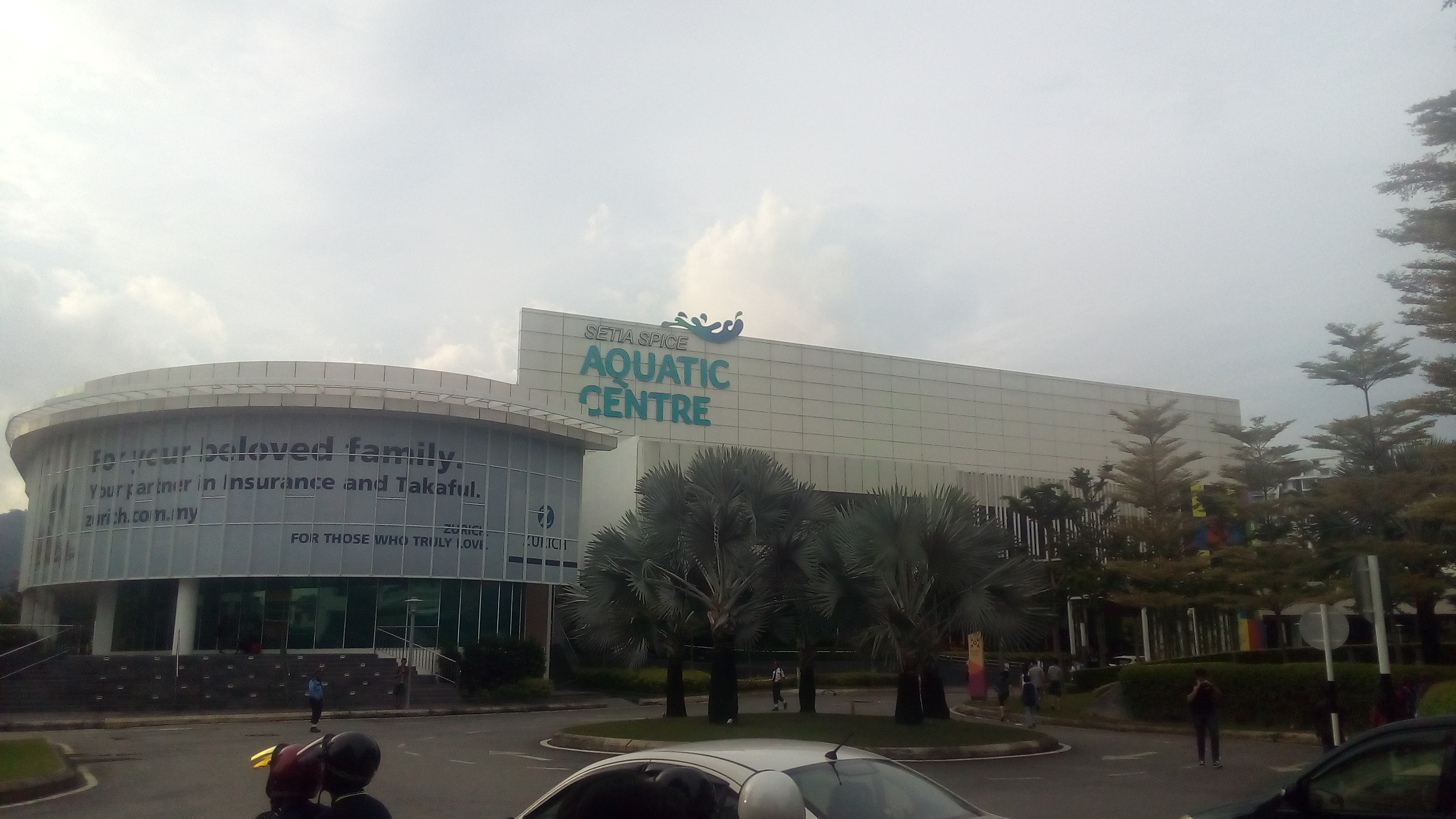
SPICE Aquatic Centre

Opened in 2016, the SPICE Aquatic Centre contains an Olympic-size swimming pool, diving platforms, function rooms, a gym, a sports clinic, and amenities catering for various indoor sports such as badminton and squash. A RM4 million photovoltaic system capable of generating up to 980 MW (1,310,000 hp) per year has been installed on both the centre and the adjoining SPICE Canopy.

=== SPICE Canopy ===
SPICE Canopy is a commercial development comprising 59 retail and foodservice outlets, with a total lettable floor area of 98,000 sq ft (9,100 m^{2}). Completed in 2015, it draws electricity from the photovoltaic system that covers its inverted “trumpet” roof, which functions as a self-cleaning water funnel.

=== Amari SPICE Hotel ===
The last of the five components to be completed, Amari SPICE Hotel was opened in 2022 to coincide with the World Congress on Innovation and Technology (WCIT) held at Setia SPICE that year. The business hotel contains a total of 453 rooms.

== See also ==
- KL Sports City
