= 2027 SEA Games =

Multi-sport event in Kuala Lumpur, Malaysia

XXXIV Southeast Asian Games
- Host city: Kuala Lumpur, Sarawak, Penang, and Johor, Malaysia
- Motto: Celebrating Unity (Malay: Raikan Perpaduan)
- Nations: 11 (expected)
- Events: 473 in 43 sports
- Opening: 18 September 2027
- Closing: 29 September 2027
- Main venue: Sarawak Stadium (opening ceremony); Bukit Jalil National Stadium (closing ceremony)
- Website: www.seagamesmalaysia2027.org

The 2027 SEA Games (Malay: Sukan Asia Tenggara 2027), officially known as the 34th Southeast Asian Games, or the 34th SEA Games (Malay: Sukan SEA ke-34), and commonly known as Malaysia 2027, is an upcoming international multi-sport event sanctioned by the Southeast Asian Games Federation (SEAGF). It is scheduled to take place from 18 to 29 September 2027 in Kuala Lumpur, Sarawak, Penang, and Johor, Malaysia. This will be the seventh time that Malaysia hosted the Games and its first time in ten years since 2017. Previously, it had also hosted the 1965, 1971, 1977, 1989, and 2001 editions of the Games.

== Host selection ==
Per SEA Games traditions, hosting duties are rotated among the SEA Games Federation (SEAGF) member countries. Each country is assigned a year to host, but may choose to do so or not.

In May 2022, the SEAGF meeting in Vietnam confirmed that Malaysia would host the regional biennial event in 2027. It was reported that the 2027 edition had been earmarked to take place in Brunei only for the country to withdraw its interest.

== Development and preparation ==
The establishment of the Malaysia SEA Games Organising Committee (MASOC) was approved by the Federal Cabinet in March 2025 to oversee the staging of the event.

=== Costs ===
In 2024, the then Youth and Sports Minister, Hannah Yeoh stated that the total organisation cost was estimated to be MYR700 million (US$162 million).

=== Venues ===
The 2027 Southeast Asian Games will utilise existing venues across four main clusters: Kuala Lumpur, Sarawak, Penang, and Johor. Other outlying venues include the National Velodrome in Nilai, Negeri Sembilan, Bidong Island in Kuala Nerus, Terengganu, and the National Sailing Center in Langkawi, Kedah. Initially, Sabah expressed its willingness to co-host the event. However, the state decided to withdraw, citing "a lack of proper facilities" as the main reason for not involving.

State	Competition Venue	Sports	Capacity
Kuala Lumpur
Kuala Lumpur	Bukit Jalil National Stadium	Athletics, closing ceremony	87,411
Kuala Lumpur	Bukit Jalil National Stadium	Rugby sevens	87,411
Kuala Lumpur	Unifi Arena	Badminton	16,000
Kuala Lumpur	Malaysia National Hockey Stadium	Field hockey	12,000
Kuala Lumpur	Juara Stadium, Bukit Kiara	Netball	2,500
Kuala Lumpur	Kuala Lumpur Polo Club	Equestrian
Kuala Lumpur	Paya Indah Wetlands	Endurance riding
Kuala Lumpur	Titiwangsa Stadium	Indoor hockey	2,500
Kuala Lumpur	Sunway Pyramid Convention Centre	Kabbadi
Kuala Lumpur	Sunway Pyramid Convention Centre	Teqball
Kuala Lumpur	Joy Division Padel / Pop Padel Bamboo Hill	Padel
Kuala Lumpur	World Trade Centre Kuala Lumpur	Pencak silat
Kuala Lumpur	Malaysia National Ice Skating Stadium (MYNISS)	Ice hockey, Ice skating	600
Sarawak	Sarawak Stadium	Opening ceremony	50,000
Sarawak	Pandelela Rinong Aquatic Centre	Aquatics	2,070
Sarawak	Kompleks Hikmah Petra Jaya	Weightlifting
Sarawak	Kuching South City Council (MBKS) Stadium	Basketball
Sarawak	Megalanes Batu Kawa	Bowling
Sarawak	Sarawak Lawn Bowls Arena	Lawn bowls
Sarawak	Imperial Hotel Kuching	Esports
Sarawak	Stadium Perpaduan	Gymnastics	4,525
Sarawak	Sarawak Golf Club	Golf
Sarawak	Borneo Cricket Ground	Cricket
Sarawak	Sarawak Archery Range	Archery
Sarawak	Sarawak Shooting Range	Shooting
Sarawak	Borneo Convention Centre Kuching (BCCK)	Muaythai
Sarawak	Borneo Convention Centre Kuching (BCCK)	Taekwondo
Sarawak	Sarawak Petanque Centre, Santubong	Pétanque
Sarawak	Sarawak Squash Centre	Squash	200
Sarawak	Sarawak Lawn Tennis Association (SLTA) Courts	Tennis
Sarawak	Wushu Training Centre	Wushu
Sarawak	Raia Hotel & Convention Centre Kuching	Dance sport
Penang	SPICE Convention Centre	Billiards and snooker
Penang	Penang Waterfront Convention Centre (PWCC)	Boxing
Penang	Penang Waterfront Convention Centre (PWCC)	Floorball
Penang	Penang Waterfront Convention Centre (PWCC)	Judo
Penang	Penang Waterfront Convention Centre (PWCC)	Table tennis
Penang	SPICE Arena	Sepak takraw	10,000
Johor	Sultan Ibrahim Stadium	Men's football	40,000
Johor	Tan Sri Dato' Haji Hassan Yunos Stadium	Men's football	30,000
Johor	Pasir Gudang Corporation Stadium	Men's football	15,000
Johor	Azman Hashim Stadium (UTM)	Men's football	4,000
Johor	Kulai Mini Stadium	Women's football	3,000
Johor	Mount Austin Athletics Stadium	Women's football	5,000
Putrajaya	Lake Recreation Centre	Water skiing
Putrajaya	Equestrian Park Putrajaya	Polo
Putrajaya	Putrajaya Challenge Park, Precinct 20	Mountain biking
Putrajaya	Putrajaya roads	Marathon
Putrajaya	Putrajaya roads	Road cycling
Putrajaya	IOI Grand Exhibition & Convention Centre, IOI City Mall Putrajaya	Fencing
Putrajaya	IOI Grand Exhibition & Convention Centre, IOI City Mall Putrajaya	Karate
Negeri Sembilan	National Velodrome, Nilai	Track cycling, BMX	2,000 (velodrome)
Negeri Sembilan	N9 Arena, Nilai	Volleyball	5,000
Kedah	National Sailing Centre, Langkawi	Sailing
Terengganu	Bidong Island, Kuala Nerus	Endurance riding

=== Torch relay ===
The 2027 Southeast Asian Games torch relay is expected to pass through all 12 administrative divisions of Sarawak. It is also expected to commence in September 2026, involving participation from communities nationwide.

=== Handover ceremony ===
As is tradition, the SEAGF flag handover ceremony and artistic performance for the 2027 SEA Games took place during the closing ceremony of the 2025 SEA Games at Rajamangala Stadium, Bangkok on 20 December 2025.

First, the SEAGF flag was handed over by Pimol Srivikorn, President of the National Olympic Committee of Thailand (NOCT), then to Chaiyapak Siriwat, Vice President and CEO of Southeast Asian Games Federation and to Tan Sri Norza Zakaria, President of the Olympic Council of Malaysia (MOM), and finally to Dr. Mohammed Taufiq Johari, Minister of Youth and Sports of Malaysia.

The artistic performance for this segment, titled Ritma Harmoni, which means Rhythm of Harmony in Malay, was presented by Mimifly, Amir Jahari and Marsha Milan.

== The Games ==
=== Opening ceremony ===
The opening ceremony is scheduled to be held at Sarawak Stadium on 18 September 2027.

=== Closing ceremony ===
The closing ceremony is scheduled to be held at Bukit Jalil National Stadium on 29 September 2027. The SEAGF flag will be handed over from Malaysia to Singapore, the host of the 2029 Southeast Asian Games.

=== Participating nations ===
All 11 members of the Southeast Asian Games Federation (SEAGF) are expected to take part in the Games.

- Brunei
- Cambodia
- Indonesia
- Laos
- Malaysia (host)
- Myanmar
- Philippines
- Singapore
- Thailand
- Timor-Leste
- Vietnam

=== Sports ===
In April 2025, Hannah Yeoh reassured that Olympic events would be prioritised when determining the potential sports to be included in the 2027 Southeast Asian Games program, subject to financial funding. On 5 December 2025, she announced a preliminary list of 38 sports, in accordance with SEAGF's requirement, the suitability of the existing venues, and additional considerations. In July 2026, the SEAGF council approved the addition of five new sports, bringing the total number to 43. Padel will make its SEA Games debut.

- Aquatics
  - Artistic swimming
  - Diving
  - Swimming
  - Water polo
- Archery
- Athletics
- Badminton
- Basketball
- Billiards and snooker
- Bowling (22)
- Boxing
- Cricket
- Cycling
  - BMX
  - Road
  - Track
- Dancesport
- Esports
- Equestrian
  - Dressage
  - Eventing
  - Jumping
  - Polo
- Fencing
- Football
  - Football
  - Futsal (1)
- Golf
- Gymnastics
  - Artistic
  - Rhythmic
- Hockey
  - Field hockey
  - Indoor hockey
- Ice hockey
- Ice skating
  - Figure skating
  - Short track speed skating
- Judo
- Kabaddi
- Karate
- Lawn bowls
- Muaythai
- Netball
- Padel
- Pencak silat
- Pétanque
- Rugby sevens
- Sailing
- Sepak takraw
  - Regu
  - Quadrant
  - Chinlone
- Shooting
- Squash
- Table tennis
- Taekwondo
- Tennis
- Teqball
- Triathlon
- Volleyball
- Waterskiing
- Weightlifting
- Wushu

== Broadcasting rights ==
Key

* Host nation (Malaysia)

2027 SEA Games Broadcasters rights in Southeast Asia
IOC Code	Country	Broadcast network	Television network	Radio network	Digital network
BRU	Brunei				
CAM	Cambodia				
INA	Indonesia				
LAO	Laos				
MAS	Malaysia*				
MYA	Myanmar				
PHI	Philippines				
SGP	Singapore				
THA	Thailand				
TLS	Timor-Leste				
VIE	Vietnam				

== Marketing ==
=== Emblem ===
The official logo and mascot design competition for the 2027 Southeast Asian Games was launched in October 2025. The winner will receive MYR8,000 (US$1,950). On July 13, 2026, the official logo, mascot, and theme were launched at IOI City Mall, Putrajaya. The logo features the number 27 (representing the year of the games, 2027), the letter M (which stands for Malaysia), and 11 differently colored segments (representing the 11 competing nations).

=== Mascot ===
The mascot is Tuah, a futuristic and robotic-looking modern character. Its name is derived from Hang Tuah, the most illustrious warrior figure in Malay literature; in Malay, the word "Tuah" also means luck or good fortune.

== See also ==
- 2027 ASEAN Para Games

Preceded by Bangkok–Chonburi	SEA Games; Malaysia; XXXIV SEA Games (2027)	Succeeded by Singapore
