= SPICE Convention Centre =

Convention centre in the Malaysian state of Penang

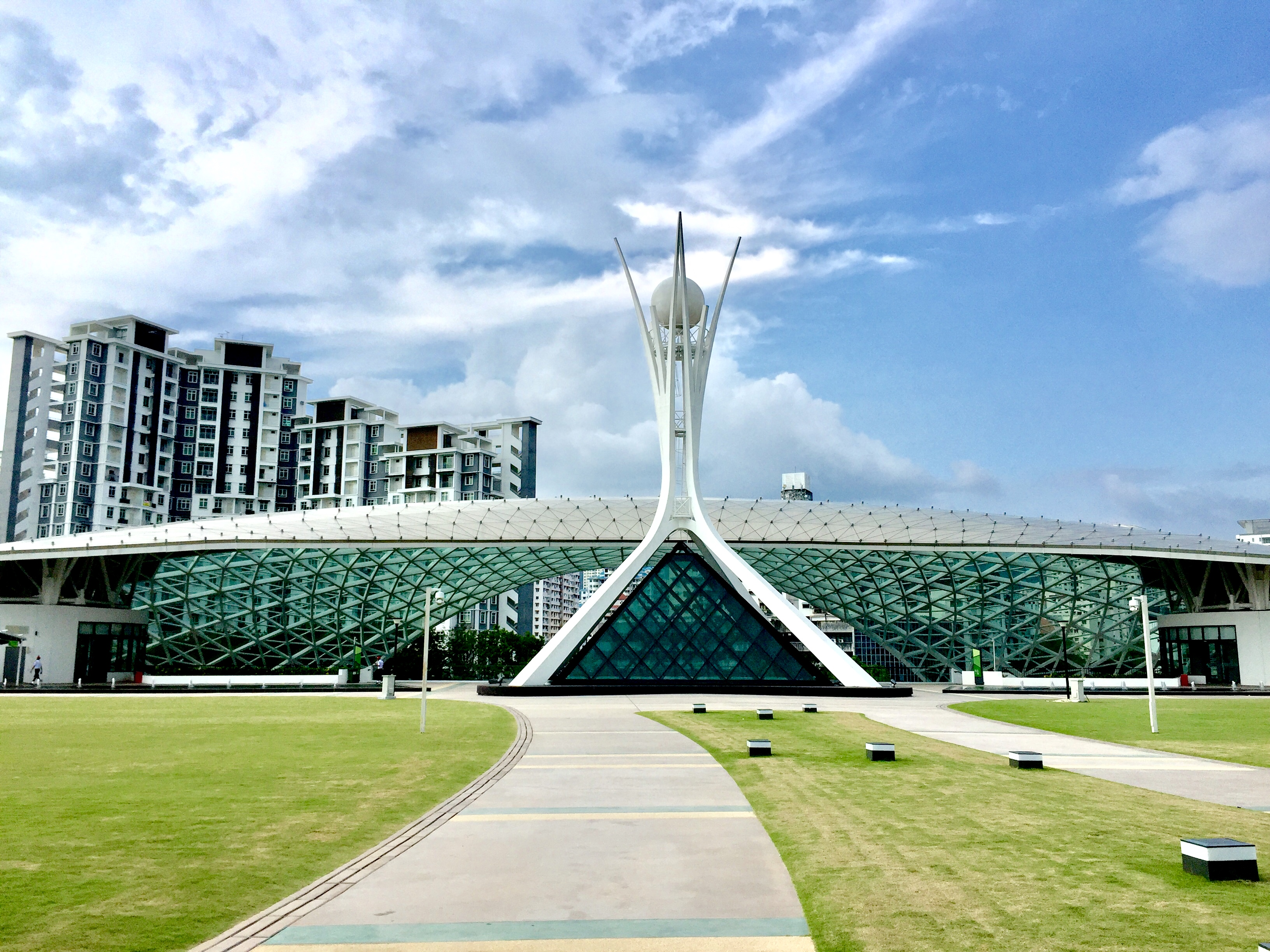
- Interactive map of SPICE Convention Centre
- Address: 108C Jalan Tun Dr Awang, Bayan Lepas
- Location: George Town, Penang, Malaysia
- Coordinates: 5°19′47″N 100°16′48″E
- Owner: Penang Island City Council
- Operator: S P Setia
- Public transit: 302, 303, 304, 308 401E

Construction
- Opened: 2017; 9 years ago
- Architect: Arup Group

SPICE Convention Centre is a subterranean convention centre in George Town within the Malaysian state of Penang. Situated within the suburb of Bayan Lepas, it was completed in 2017 and forms part of the Setia SPICE complex. The convention centre contains an event space of 78,959 m^{2} (849,910 sq ft), the largest in Penang.

== History ==
In 1997, the 25.4-acre (10.3 ha) Penang International Sports Arena (abbrev. PISA) was built by the Penang Island Municipal Council (now Penang Island City Council) at a cost of RM102.5 million. At the time, the PISA complex comprised an indoor arena (now renamed SPICE Arena) and a centre for aquatic sports. Although PISA was subsequently selected as a venue for the 2000 Sukma Games and the 2001 SEA Games, the complex was plagued by poor design and maintenance. By 2011, the municipal government estimated a budget of RM25 million to extensively repair PISA.

After the 2008 state election, the new Pakatan Rakyat-led state government saw the construction of an international-grade convention centre as a necessity to diversify the state's economy. However, as the municipal government lacked the financial means to undertake its construction, the state government under Chief Minister Lim Guan Eng initiated a request for proposal to redevelop PISA.

In 2011, Malaysian property developer S P Setia was granted a 30-year concession from the municipal government to redevelop PISA, which was subsequently renamed Setia SPICE. A key requirement of the tender was to preserve the existing greenery on the site. S P Setia's proposal included a new subterranean convention centre topped with a layer of grass, as well as a playground and a spice garden. Construction of the SPICE Convention Centre commenced in 2012 and was complete by 2017.

== Description ==
Designed by Arup Group, SPICE Convention Centre contains a meeting space of 74,899 m^{2} (806,210 sq ft), distributed across 16 rooms located on two floors – one at ground level and another 3 m (9.8 ft) below ground. Additionally, it has a 4,060 m^{2} (43,700 sq ft) pillarless ballroom, recognised as the largest in Malaysia by The Malaysia Book of Records, with a seating capacity of 8,000 in theatre configuration.

The convention centre features a 7-acre (2.8 ha) public park situated on its roof, also touted as the largest in the country. The park includes a playground, a bamboo park and a spice garden, and is equipped with a rainwater harvesting system. In addition, it is illuminated by 654 solar-powered light-emitting diodes (LEDs) and incorporates daylighting features to help reduce the structure's internal temperature. The design of the centre necessitated the installation of 40 m (130 ft) span trusses with fabricated joints to accommodate the added weight of the garden.
