= Mohamad Norza Zakaria =

Malaysian sports administrator and chartered accountant

Yang Berbahagia Tan Sri Datuk Seri Mohamad Norza Zakaria PSM SMW SSAP DJMK DIMP SMP

5th President of the Olympic Council of Malaysia
- Incumbent
- Assumed office 5 May 2018
- Minister: Khairy Jamaluddin (5–10 May 2018); Syed Saddiq Abdul Rahman (2018–2020); Reezal Merican Naina Merican (2020–2021); Ahmad Faizal Azumu (2021–2022); Hannah Yeoh Tseow Suan (since 2022)
- Deputy: Abdul Azim Zabidi (2018–2021); Hamidin Mohd Amin (since 2021)
- Preceded by: Tunku Imran

12th President of the Badminton Association of Malaysia
- In office 29 April 2017 – 24 August 2024
- Patron: Rosmah Mansor (2017–2018); Wan Azizah Wan Ismail (2018–2021); Muhaini Zainal Abidin (2021–2024)
- Preceded by: Tengku Mahaleel Tengku Ariff; Mohd Al-Amin Abdul Majid (acting)
- Succeeded by: V. Subramaniam (acting); Tengku Zafrul Aziz

Personal details
- Born: Mohamad Norza bin Zakaria; 29 August 1966 (age 60) Melaka, Malaysia
- Citizenship: Malaysian
- Education: University of Wollongong
- Occupation: Businessman, Entrepreneur, International Sports Administrator
- Profession: Chartered Accountant (FCPA Australia, CA MIA)
- Known for: Executive Chairman & President of Citaglobal Berhad; President of Olympic Council of Malaysia
- Website: citaglobal.my

Mohamad Norza bin Zakaria (born in 1966) is a Malaysian sports administrator and chartered accountant. He is a fellow of CPA Australia. He is the President of Olympic Council of Malaysia (OCM) and also the President of Commonwealth Games Association of Malaysia. He served as the 12th President of the Badminton Association of Malaysia (BAM) from April 2017 to August 2024.

He participated in sports administration when he was first elected as the President of the Kuala Lumpur Badminton Association in 2010. He later became the President of Badminton Association of Malaysia (BAM) in 2017, a post he held until 24 August 2024.

During his leadership at BAM, Malaysian won its first World Championship title in badminton through the Men's Doubles pair of Aaron Chia and Soh Wooi Yik. Another highlight was the emergence of women's doubles pair Pearly Tan and Thinaah Muralitharan who created history by becoming the first Malaysian women's doubles pair to win the French Open title since its inception in 1908.

Norza is a board member of National Sports Council (NSC) and Chairman of Audit Committee of NSC since 2018. In search of Malaysia's first ever Olympic gold medal, Sports Minister Hannah Yeoh established a Road to Gold (RTG) Committee to boost athletes' performance win gold medals at the 2024 and the 2028 Olympics. Together with the Honorable Sports Minister, Norza co-chairs the committee.

On 8 September 2024, Norza was officially elected as the Vice President of the Olympic Council of Asia (OCA) for Southeast Asia. He won the post unopposed for the 2024–2028 term at the OCA General Assembly in New Delhi, India.

Norza's record of delivery historic milestones while strengthening badminton's foundations was recognised at the international level when he was elected as a BWF Council member on 26 April 2025 at the 80th BWF Annual General Meeting held in Xiamen, China PR.

On 22 October 2025, Norza was appointed as the Chair of the Ethics Commission of the Islamic Solidarity Sports Association (ISSA), an international sports organisation operating under the Organization of Islamic Cooperation (OIC). The appointment, endorsed by HRH Prince Abdulaziz Bin Turki Al-Faisal, President of ISSA and Saudi Minister of Sport, entrusts him with leading the newly established commission responsible for promoting ethical governance and integrity across the Islamic Sports Movement and the Islamic Solidarity Games.

His other roles included:

- Chef de Mission (CDM) of Malaysia for the 28th Southeast Asian Games which was held from 5–16 June 2015 in Singapore. The gold medal tally achieved by the Malaysian contingent in Singapore is still the highest to date for a SEA Games held outside Malaysia.
- Chairman of the National Sports Institute Board (October 2013 - May 2017)
- Treasurer of the Football Association of Malaysia (May 2014 - March 2017)
- President of the Royal Malaysian Polo Association (RMPA) (2021 - 2022)
- President of the Putra Polo Club, Malaysia (August 2015 – present)

== Early life and educational background ==
Norza is the son of school teachers and was born in Malacca and grew up in Negeri Sembilan. After his studies in Sekolah Tuanku Jaafar in Kuala Pilah, Negeri Sembilan, he received his Higher School of Certificate from the Randwick Boys High School in Australia in 1985.

A Chartered Accountant (CA) from the Malaysian Institute of Accountants (MIA) by profession, Norza studied and received his Bachelor of Commerce in Accounting from the University of Wollongong in Australia from 1986 to 1988.

In 2008, Norza qualified as a Fellow of CPA Australia (FCPA) from CPA Australia Ltd. He is also a Chartered Accountant (CA) with the Malaysian Institute of Accountants (MIA).

In 2021, he was awarded an Honorary Doctorate in Sports Management by the Sultan Idris Education University (UPSI).

== Professional background ==
As a Chartered accountant, Norza started his career with Arthur Andersen & Co, and held positions at Bank Negara Malaysia, Petronas, SPK Sentosa, Mun Loong Berhad and Gabungan Strategik Sdn Bhd.

Norza sits on board of Citaglobal Berhad and is the Executive Chairman & President of the company since February 2020. He is also the Group President & CEO of TIZA Global Sdn Bhd, a company he started in 2008 that has a wide diversity of business holdings from oil and gas, hospitality, transportation and media technology.

Prior to starting TIZA Global Sdn. Bhd., Norza served as the Political Secretary to the Malaysian Minister of Finance II for the term of 2004 - 2008.

Previously, Norza has been appointed as the board of directors and Chairman of Audit Committee of a government linked PLCs, namely AirAsia Aviation Group Ltd., Bintulu Port Holdings Berhad, Samalaju Industrial Port Sdn Bhd, Lembaga Urusan Tabung Haji, Institut Terjemahan Negara Malaysia, PT XL Axiata Tbk (formerly known as PT Excelcomindo Pratama Tbk), Pelikan International Corporation Berhad, TH Heavy Engineering Berhad, Tropicana Corporation Berhad, Tropicana Gold & Country Resort Berhad, RHP Saribas Sdn. Bhd., TH Heavy Engineering Berhad, TH Plantations Berhad, THHE Fabricators Sdn. Bhd. and Biport Bulkers Sdn. Bhd.

== Honours ==
- Malaysia
  - Commander of the Order of Loyalty to the Crown of Malaysia (PSM) – Tan Sri (2020)
- Federal Territory (Malaysia)
  - Grand Commander of the Order of the Territorial Crown (SMW) – Datuk Seri (2015)
- Kelantan
  - Knight Commander of the Order of the Life of the Crown of Kelantan (DJMK) – Dato' (2006)
- Pahang
  - Knight Companion of the Order of the Crown of Pahang (DIMP) – Dato' (2004)
  - Grand Knight of the Order of Sultan Ahmad Shah of Pahang (SSAP) – Dato' Sri (2016)
- Perlis
  - Member of the Order of the Crown of Perlis (AMP) (2001)
  - Companion of the Order of the Crown of Perlis (SMP) (2002)

On 17 August 2020, Norza was conferred the award of 'Darjah Kebesaran Panglima Setia Mahkota (PSM)' which carries the title 'Tan Sri' by the Yang di-Pertuan Agong Al-Sultan Abdullah Ri'ayatuddin Al-Mustafa Billah Shah Ibni Almarhum Sultan Haji Ahmad Shah Al-Musta'in Billah in conjunction with the birthday celebrations of Yang di-Pertuan Agong Al-Sultan Abdullah Ri'ayatuddin Al-Mustafa Billah Shah.

Earlier on 24 October 2016, he was conferred the award of 'Darjah Sri Sultan Ahmad Shah Pahang (SSAP)’ which carries the title 'Dato' Sri' by Tengku Mahkota of Pahang, Tengku Abdullah ibni Sultan Ahmad Shah in conjunction with the birthday celebrations of Sultan Ahmad Shah of Pahang.

Prior to this, Norza was conferred the award of 'Darjah Kebesaran Seri Mahkota Wilayah (SMW)’ which carries the title 'Datuk Seri' by the Yang di-Pertuan Agong Almu’tasimu Billahi Muhibbuddin Tuanku AlHaj Abdul Halim Mu’adzam Shah Ibni AlMarhum Sultan Badlishah in conjunction with Federal Territory Day on 1 February 2015.

== Awards ==
In recognition of his leadership qualities in sports, the Sportswriters Association of Malaysia (SAM) selected Norza as the first recipient of the Sports Leadership Award in conjunction with the SAM-100PLUS 2022 Awards ceremony held on 5 September 2023. On 13 May 2025, Norza received the Sports Leadership Award on the occasion of the National Sports Awards 2024 organised by the National Sports Council.

Internationally, the World Chinese Economic Forum awarded Norza with its Lifetime Achievement Award on 27 December 2021 in recognition of his invaluable contribution and support for the 2021 World Chinese Economic Forum.

In February 2025, Norza received the Kuala Lumpur Badminton Association's (KLBA) Leadership Award. This award recognizes Norza's dedication and contributions as KLBA President from 2010 to 2017. Under his leadership, KLBA made great strides in Malaysian badminton, namely the professionalisation of the administration within the KLBA and the development of grassroots badminton amongst schools and clubs in Kuala Lumpur which years later, led to the discovery of Soh Wooi Yik, Malaysia's first World Champion in Badminton.

On 16 October 2025, Norza was honoured with the Inspiring ASEAN Entrepreneur Mentor Award by the ASEAN Young Entrepreneurs Council (AYEC) during the 10th ASEAN Young Entrepreneurs Carnival Awards & Gala Dinner held at MATRADE, Kuala Lumpur. The recognition highlighted his leadership in nurturing Malaysia's sporting excellence, fostering youth development, and mentoring the next generation of entrepreneurs across ASEAN.

On 23 October 2025, Norza was conferred the Anugerah Tokoh Sukan Wilayah Persekutuan 2023–2024 in recognition of his outstanding leadership and enduring contribution to Malaysia's sporting development. Presented during the Federal Territory Sports Awards 2023–2024 ceremony, the honour recognises his role in advancing excellence and integrity within Malaysia's sporting arena.
