= Tabung Haji Tower =

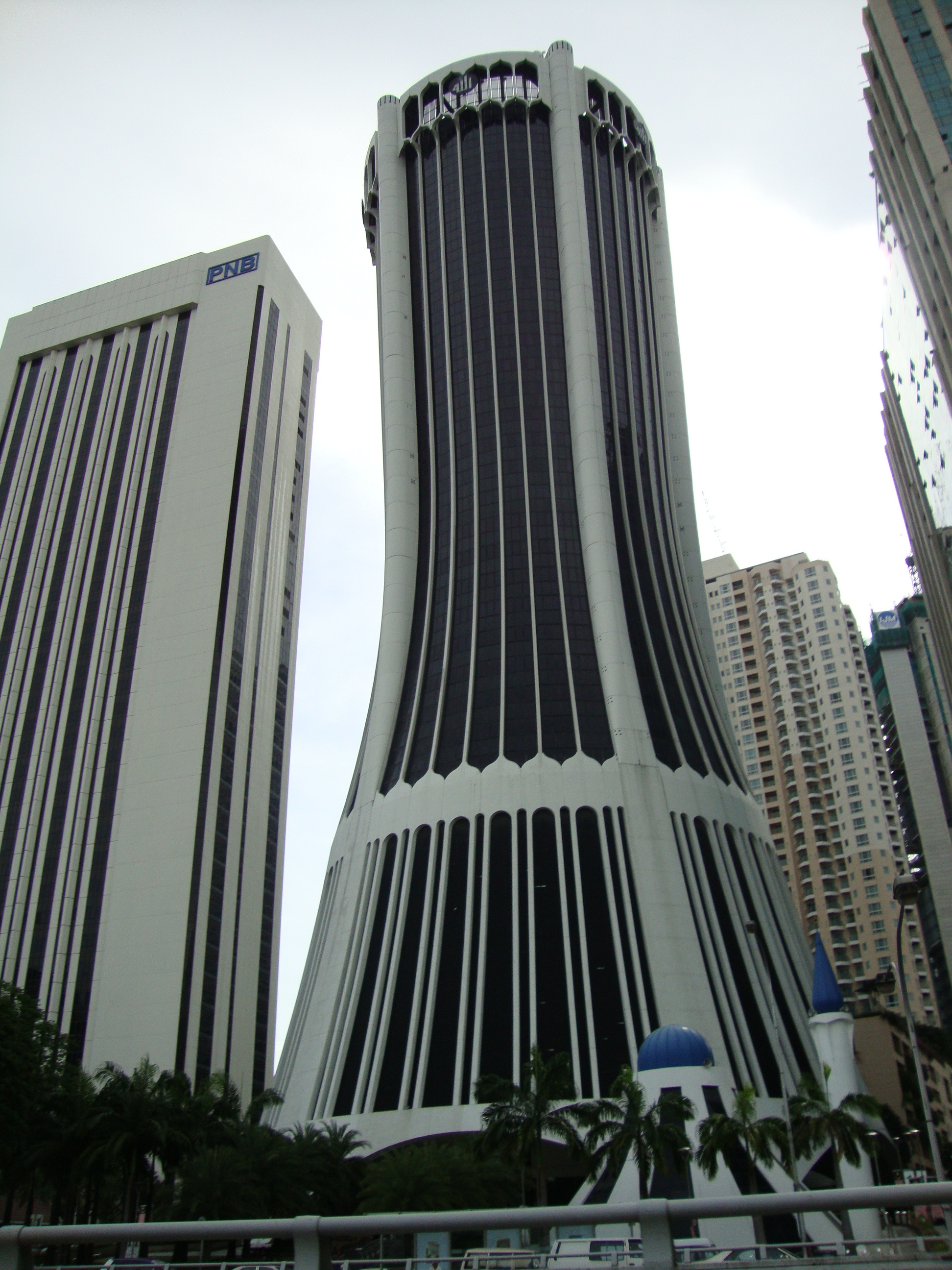
- Alternative names: Menara Tabung Haji; Bangunan LUTH

General information
- Type: Offices
- Location: Jalan Tun Razak; Kuala Lumpur, Malaysia
- Construction started: 1982
- Completed: 1984

Height
- Roof: 152 m (499 ft)

Technical details
- Floor count: 38

Design and construction
- Architect: Hijjas Kasturi

The Tabung Haji Tower (Malay: Menara Tabung Haji) is a 38-storey, 152 m (499 ft) office skyscraper and is the headquarters of Malaysian Hajj Pilgrims Fund Board in Kuala Lumpur, Malaysia. The tower, designed by architect Hijjas Kasturi, was completed in 1984.

== Access ==
The building is within walking distance from Ampang Park LRT/MRT station and Persiaran KLCC MRT station.

== See also ==
- List of tallest buildings in Kuala Lumpur
