= 2025 SEA Games closing ceremony =

- Date: 20 December 2025; 6 months ago
- Time: 19:00–20:26 ICT (UTC+7)
- Venue: Rajamangala Stadium
- Location: Bangkok, Thailand; 13°45′19″N 100°37′22″E
- Filmed by: National Broadcasting Services of Thailand (NBT)
- Footage: 2025 SEA Games closing ceremony in the VTV Thể Thao (VTV Sports) on YouTube

The closing ceremony of the 2025 SEA Games took place at Rajamangala Stadium on 20 December 2025.

The SEAGF flag was handed over to Malaysia, the host country of the 2027 edition. The handover segment included performances by Malaysian artistes Marsha Milan, Amir Jahari and Mimifly. The games were officially closed by Thamanat Prompow, Deputy Prime Minister of Thailand.

== Proceedings ==
The closing ceremony took place at the Rajamangala Stadium and, as per tradition, involved a parade of flags and athletes and the handover ceremony.

== Anthems ==
- (Thailand) Thai National Anthem – Phleng Chat Thai
- SEAGF Anthem
- National Anthem of Malaysia – Negaraku
