= BIMB Holdings =

Investment holding company based in Kuala Lumpur, Malaysia

BIMB Holdings Berhad
- Company type: Public limited company-government-owned investment company
- Traded as: MYX: 5258
- ISIN: MYL5258OO008
- Industry: Finance
- Founded: 20 March 1997; 29 years ago
- Headquarters: 31st Floor, Menara Bank Islam, 22, Jalan Perak, 50450 Kuala Lumpur, Malaysia
- Key people: Samsudin Osman, Chairman; Zukri Samat, Group CEO
- Parent: Tabung Haji
- Subsidiaries: Bank Islam Malaysia Berhad; Takaful Malaysia Berhad; BIMB Securities
- Website: www.bimbholdings.com

BIMB Holdings Berhad (MYX: 5258) is an investment holding company based in Kuala Lumpur, Malaysia. It is owned by the state-owned enterprise, Tabung Haji.

== Subsidiaries ==
- Bank Islam Malaysia Berhad
- Takaful Malaysia Berhad
- BIMB Securities
