= Royal Commission of Inquiry into Tabung Haji =

2022 Malaysian investigation

- Native name: Suruhanjaya Siasatan Diraja Tabung Haji
- Date: 20 January – 19 July 2022
- Location: Kompleks Islam Putrajaya, Putrajaya, Malaysia
- Type: Royal commission
- Cause: Financial and governance issues at Tabung Haji between 2014 and 2020
- Participants: Six commissioners, chaired by Md Raus Sharif
- Outcome: Report presented to the Yang di-Pertuan Agong on 30 August 2022; declassified and published 29 July 2026

The Royal Commission of Inquiry into Tabung Haji was a Malaysian royal commission appointed in 2022 to investigate the management and operations of Tabung Haji, the country's hajj savings and pilgrimage board, between 2014 and 2020. It was chaired by Md Raus Sharif, a former chief justice, and reported to the Yang di-Pertuan Agong on 30 August 2022.

The commission concluded that Tabung Haji was in serious financial difficulty by the 2017 financial year and that its published accounts for that year did not show this. Applying the Malaysian Financial Reporting Standards in full, it found, the fund would have recorded a net loss of 1.4 billion Malaysian ringgit (RM) rather than the RM3.4 billion profit it reported. It attributed the position to profit distributions that exceeded what the fund could afford, an asset valuation method that inflated reported profits, weak oversight by the National Audit Department, an expanded investment mandate, and a growing hajj subsidy commitment.

The commission recommended amending the Tabung Haji Act 1995 to bar active politicians from the board, to split ministerial responsibility between the minister of religious affairs and the minister of finance, and to require that profit distributions be calculated from audited accounts. It also called for forensic audits of 14 investments and for the recovery of bonuses paid to directors of a subsidiary.

The report was classified on submission and remained unpublished for almost four years. Prime Minister Anwar Ibrahim later said it had been withheld to avoid public alarm and a run on deposits. It was declassified and released by the Department of Islamic Development Malaysia (JAKIM) on 29 July 2026, and the Cabinet directed enforcement agencies to open investigations into its findings.

== Background ==
Tabung Haji was established under the Tabung Haji Act 1995 (Act 535), succeeding the Pilgrims Management and Fund Board created in 1969 and, before that, the Malayan Muslim Pilgrims Savings Corporation set up in 1963. Its stated purpose was to allow Malaysian Muslims to save for the hajj and to manage the pilgrimage itself.

Concerns about the fund's finances became public in 2018, when the auditor general issued an "emphasis of matter" on its 2017 accounts. Tabung Haji subsequently commissioned reviews from PricewaterhouseCoopers, Ernst & Young and Roland Berger. The PwC financial review found a gap between assets and liabilities dating back to 2014.

== Establishment ==
The Cabinet first identified the need for an inquiry on 14 August 2020, agreed to establish one on 14 July 2021 under the Commissions of Enquiry Act 1950 (Act 119), and settled its objectives and scope on 8 October 2021. The terms of reference were to examine issues at Tabung Haji between 2014 and 2020 with reference to the PwC, EY and Roland Berger findings, to determine whether information had been concealed or misleading statements made, and to recommend action against any party found to have breached the law. The restructuring and recovery plan then under way was excluded from the scope.

The Yang di-Pertuan Agong, Al-Sultan Abdullah, consented to the appointment of six commissioners on 20 January 2022 for a term of six months ending 19 July:

- Md Raus Sharif, former chief justice (chairman)
- Samsudin Osman, former chief secretary to the government
- Abdul Rashid Hussain, founder of the RHB Group
- Mohd Munir Abdul Majid, former chairman of Bank Muamalat Malaysia
- Asmadi Mohamed Naim, vice-chancellor of Universiti Islam Antarabangsa Sultan Abdul Halim Mu'adzam Shah
- Norsyahrin Hamidon, chartered accountant

Hakimah Mohd Yusoff, then deputy director-general of JAKIM, was appointed secretary. Three officers from the Attorney General's Chambers served as conducting officers.

== Proceedings ==
The commission used four methods: collection of records and documents, briefings from government agencies, statutory declarations from witnesses, and oral proceedings. Hearings were held at the Islamic Complex in Putrajaya, with interpreters from the Federal Court of Malaysia assisting. The commission completed its work within the six months allowed and signed the report on 19 July 2022.

== Findings ==
=== Governance ===
The commission found several provisions of Act 535 unsuited to current conditions. The Act gives the responsible minister broad powers over hajj operations, funds and investment, but the three ministers of religious affairs who oversaw the fund during the period had expertise only in religious matters and relied on proposals put to them by the board and management. Documents reviewed by the commission recorded ministerial decisions as "agreed as proposed".

Section 6(2) requires only that the chairman and board members be Muslim Malaysian citizens, with no competency criteria. The commission noted that several chairmen and board members appointed between 2014 and 2018 were active politicians, and that decisions on profit distribution, hajj fees and hajj financial support were influenced by political considerations.

The Act also allows the minister to revoke any appointment at any time without giving reasons. This power was used to end the service of chief executive Nik Mohd Hasyudeen Yusoff on 5 May 2021 and of chairman Md Nor Md Yusof on 15 October 2021, both before their terms expired.

Board members and senior managers held positions across many subsidiaries, which the commission said reduced their focus on the fund itself and created conflicts of interest. Because the investment panel, Shariah advisory committee and hajj management committee are not established by statute, the investment panel was dissolved administratively in 2018 and replaced with a body the commission considered inconsistent with Act 535.

=== Financial position ===
The auditor general's emphasis of matter, dated 16 July 2018, recorded that Tabung Haji had changed its impairment policy twice during the 2017 financial year and had not recognised RM227.81 million of impairment on three subsidiaries and three associates, including RM164.58 million on TH Heavy Engineering Berhad.

The commission accepted much of the subsequent PwC review, which found that the fund had not impaired investments in associates and subsidiaries, had not impaired fixed income instruments, had not met the standard for fair value losses on property investments, had distributed 2017 profits without accounting for those losses, and had recorded dividend income from subsidiaries that was never paid to it. On a full application of the reporting standards, the commission concluded, Tabung Haji would have reported a net loss of RM1.4 billion for 2017 instead of a RM3.4 billion profit.

=== Causes ===
The commission identified five contributing factors.

Distributions of profit (hibah) between 2014 and 2017 exceeded the fund's financial capacity and depleted its reserves. High rates attracted depositors seeking returns, which the commission said moved Tabung Haji away from its founding purpose and exposed it to the risk of large withdrawals. After the 2019 rate was announced at 1.25 per cent, deposits fell from about RM73 billion to RM69 billion.

Management valued assets using realisable asset value rather than the figures in the audited accounts when testing compliance with section 22 of Act 535, on the basis that the section does not define "asset". This produced higher asset values and made no allowance for investments that had fallen in value. Media reports described the practice as creative accounting.

The commission criticised the National Audit Department for issuing unqualified audit certificates from 2014 to 2017. It quoted a letter from the auditor general to the prime minister dated 19 December 2018 stating that a qualified opinion had been proposed for 2017 but that an unqualified opinion with an emphasis of matter was issued instead, after consideration that a qualified opinion would affect depositor perception. The commission said this took into account matters outside the scope of the audit, that no clean certificate should have been issued for 2017, and that without one the fund could not have declared the 4.50 per cent annual and 1.75 per cent hajj distributions that cost RM2.75 billion.

An added vision of Tabung Haji as an economic pillar of the Muslim community took it into large property and plantation investments in which it had no expertise.

Hajj costs rose from RM15,553 per Muassasah pilgrim in 2013 to RM25,540 in 2022, while pilgrims paid RM9,980 from 2014 to 2019. The shortfall was met by the Hajj Financial Support subsidy, which grew from RM106 million in 2014 to RM300 million in 2019. The commission projected it could approach RM400 million a year from 2022 and RM742.47 million by 2030.

=== Bonuses ===
Staff bonuses between 2010 and 2017 ranged from two to thirteen months of salary. The 2014 allocation was RM74 million, at one to eleven months plus a two-month special bonus. The commission said the payments were justified by profits that existed only under the realisable asset value method and were therefore improper. It separately found that RM2.2 million in special bonuses was paid to directors and management of TH Properties Sdn. Bhd. in 2017 and 2018 without the approval of Tabung Haji as shareholder, approved by an executive committee that had no mandate to do so.

=== Investments ===
The commission found the investment decision process disorganised, with no coordination between the chief investment officer, corporate finance head, property head and treasury head. The chairman of the investment panel acknowledged that the panel had not been firm enough and that its approach was loose and incomplete.

It recommended forensic audits of 14 investments. Losses recorded in the report include:

- FGV Berhad: RM1.25 billion invested at an average of RM4.58 per unit, with the share price later falling to RM0.885. Unrealised losses of RM1.06 billion were avoided only because Urusharta Jamaah acquired the shares at cost.
- Trurich Resources Sdn. Bhd.: RM364.31 million fully impaired, with US$179 million outstanding to Maybank.
- Al-Rawda Real Estates: 560.7 million Saudi riyal (SR) in rental arrears on four hotels in Mecca and Medina as at 31 December 2021, an expected credit loss of RM202.8 million and a further RM184 million anticipated for 2021.
- PT TH Indo Plantations: shares transferred to the buyer before full payment, a US$100 million reduction from the original US$910 million price, and a US$178.6 million advance that the buyer should have paid.
- Deru Semangat Sdn. Bhd.: RM257 million impaired to RM32 million after plantation development breached a no-deforestation policy.
- Alam Maritim Resources and TH Marine: RM198 million of equity fully impaired and RM80 million of RM136 million in financing impaired.
- Putrajaya Perdana Berhad: RM145.3 million impairment.
- TH Plantations Berhad: RM170 million impairment at fund level.
- Abraj Sdn. Bhd.: RM40.25 million.
- Emrail Sdn. Bhd.: RM19.3 million.
- Wellspring Worldwide Limited: RM19.03 million.
- Alfareeda Residential Fund: SR76 million written off in full.

=== Urusharta Jamaah ===
Urusharta Jamaah Sdn. Bhd. (UJSB) was incorporated on 14 December 2018 to address the gap between the fund's assets and liabilities, on a model derived from Danaharta. Tabung Haji transferred 106 listed shareholdings, a plantation company and 29 properties at RM19.9 billion against a market value of RM9.7 billion, a premium of RM10.2 billion. In exchange UJSB issued zero-coupon sukuk murabahah subscribed entirely by the fund: RM10 billion over seven years at a 4.05 per cent yield to maturity, and RM9.6 billion over ten years at 4.10 per cent, together with RM300 million in cash.

The Cabinet approved RM17.8 billion on 5 April 2019 to fund the redemption shortfall, of which RM500 million fell under the Eleventh Malaysia Plan and RM17.3 billion, averaging about RM1.73 billion a year, under the Twelfth and Thirteenth Malaysia Plans. Accruals on the sukuk came to almost 26 per cent of the fund's annual income. The commission described failure to meet the UJSB obligation as Tabung Haji's largest single risk.

== Recommendations ==
The commission rejected proposals to break Tabung Haji into separate entities, concluding that the existing structure should be retained and its management improved. Its main recommendations were to:

- amend Act 535 to set competency criteria for board members, bar active politicians from serving as chairman or board member of the fund and its subsidiaries, require reasons before any appointment is revoked, and place the investment panel, Shariah advisory committee and hajj management committee on a statutory footing;
- divide ministerial responsibility, with the minister of religious affairs responsible for hajj management and the minister of finance for funds and investment, and have the prime minister appoint the board and chief executive on the recommendation of an independent advisory body;
- limit the involvement of board members and management in subsidiaries;
- end regulation of the fund by Bank Negara Malaysia, or confine it to reserves and liquidity;
- replace the National Audit Department with a private accounting firm as auditor;
- calculate profit distributions from audited annual accounts rather than proforma reports or realisable asset value;
- stop excessive staff bonuses and recover those paid to TH Properties directors and management;
- commission forensic audits of the 14 investments listed in the report and hold board members, subsidiary directors and management accountable for the losses;
- create a department within the fund, to be called Dana Haji, responsible for investment and regulated by the Securities Commission Malaysia;
- raise the minimum deposit for automatic hajj registration from RM1,300 to the prevailing Muassasah cost, then RM12,980, which the commission estimated would cut the waiting period from 130 years to 33 years;
- limit large withdrawals and require one month's notice; and
- restrict hajj subsidies to pilgrims who need them.

The commission also asked the government to fund the RM1.73 billion annual allocation for early redemption of the UJSB sukuk, and to consider a government guarantee and tradeable structure for any reissued sukuk.

== Enforcement and disciplinary action ==
Tabung Haji made four police reports between November 2018 and January 2019, covering spending by Yayasan Tabung Haji, the sale of its stake in PT TH Indo Plantations, land suitability reports relating to Trurich, and alleged misrepresentation to the board that enabled the 2017 profit distribution. Six further matters were referred to the Malaysian Anti-Corruption Commission, including allegations relating to a plantation acquisition by TH Plantations and to tenancy arrangements at fund premises. Investigation papers were forwarded to the Attorney General's Chambers, which did not bring charges. The commission noted that inquiries involving Indonesia had been slowed by the need for cooperation from Indonesian authorities.

Five senior officers faced internal disciplinary proceedings. In each case the penalty imposed by the disciplinary committee was reduced on appeal, from dismissal to demotion or from demotion to a warning, and all five remained employed within the group at the time of the report. The commission found that between ten and nineteen months had passed between officers' written representations and the disciplinary committee sittings, and said the process should be tightened.

== Publication and reception ==
The report was submitted in 2022 but classified, with its exhibits held under the Official Secrets Act 1972. Anwar Ibrahim said in July 2026 that it had been withheld to prevent public alarm and withdrawals by depositors. Former prime minister Ismail Sabri Yaakob was among those who called for its release.

JAKIM published the report on 29 July 2026 as a document containing an executive summary, four chapters and a list of classified exhibits. Malaysian media described the published document as running to 211 pages.

Communications Minister Fahmi Fadzil said the Cabinet had ordered enforcement agencies to begin full investigations immediately and that anyone found to have broken the law would be prosecuted. He added that the report would be tabled and debated at a special sitting of Parliament, and that Tabung Haji had already implemented about 75 per cent of the report's 25 recommendations. Tabung Haji welcomed the release and said it had already addressed the issues raised. Deputy Prime Minister Ahmad Zahid Hamidi said the report should not be politicised.

== See also ==
- Hajj
