= Tabung Haji =

Hajj fund board in Malaysia

Lembaga Tabung Haji
- Type: State-owned enterprise
- Industry: Finance; Hospitality; Property; Plantation; Information technology
- Founded: 30 September 1963; 62 years ago (as Malayan Muslim Pilgrims Savings Corporation); 8 August 1969; 56 years ago (as Lembaga Urusan dan Tabung Haji); 1 June 1995; 31 years ago (as Tabung Haji)
- Founder: Ungku Abdul Aziz
- Headquarters: Tabung Haji Tower, 201, Jalan Tun Razak, 50400 Kuala Lumpur, Malaysia
- Key people: Abdul Rashid Hussain, Chairman
- Revenue: RM5,034 mil (2024)
- Net income: RM2,422 mil (2024)
- Subsidiaries: See subsidiaries
- Website: tabunghaji.gov.my

Lembaga Tabung Haji (Jawi: لمباݢ تابوڠ حاج ; Arabic صندوق الحج) also known as Tabung Haji or TH is the Malaysian hajj pilgrims fund board. It was formerly known as Lembaga Urusan dan Tabung Haji (LUTH). The main headquarters is located at Tabung Haji Tower, Jalan Tun Razak, Kuala Lumpur. Tabung Haji facilitates savings for the pilgrimage to Mecca through investment in Shariah-compliant vehicles. Through its subsidiaries, the company also engaged in other industries such as finance, hospitality, property, plantation and information technology.

Prior to the establishment of Lembaga Tabung Haji, there was no Islamic financial institution in Malaysia through which Muslims could save for hajj expenses. The economist Mehmet Asutay has described Tabung Haji as the first Islamic ethics-driven company in the world. Even though several banks were already operating, the Muslims were reluctant to use conventional banking for their hajj savings because they wanted to ensure that their hajj savings were free from riba (usury) in order to attain a Mabrur (accepted) Hajj.

== History ==
Lembaga Urusan dan Tabung Haji (LUTH) was founded in 1969 through a merger between Hajj Prospects Provident Fund Corporation (PWSBH) with Hajj Affairs Office based on the idea by Prof Ungku Aziz. Through his study on how the Malay people saved their money for hajj when he was an economic lecturer in Universiti Malaya, he came out with a paperwork for the Federation of Malaya government on 30 September 1959 that aimed to improve the economy of the hajj prospects. The idea was for the people to save money in a shariah-compliance organization and have all of their hajj affairs to Mecca be taken care of by same organization while at the same time getting dividend payout that are free from the elements of usury that can be found in most conventional banking.

In 1995, the name of the Lembaga Urusan dan Tabung Haji was shorten to Lembaga Tabung Haji.

In 2016, Tabung Haji Foundation (YTH) was founded with a contribution of RM7 millions to the program, among others, to implement humanitarian assistance and contribution to the poor, the underprivileged, and the needy.

Starting with RM46,610 deposit from 1,281 depositors on 30 September 1963 under PWSBH, TH in 2017 has recorded a total deposit of RM73 billions from nine million depositors and 125 branches with almost ten thousand 'touch-points' across Malaysia. Outside Malaysia, Tabung Haji has an office in Jeddah that is under the supervision of the Malaysian consulate.

== Financial crisis and royal commission of inquiry ==
The fund's finances came under public scrutiny in 2018, when the auditor general issued an "emphasis of matter" on its 2017 accounts and a financial review by PricewaterhouseCoopers found that liabilities had exceeded assets since 2014. Under a restructuring plan approved by the Cabinet in December 2018, Tabung Haji transferred 106 listed shareholdings, a plantation company and 29 properties to Urusharta Jamaah Sdn. Bhd., a special purpose vehicle, at a value of RM19.9 billion against a market value of RM9.7 billion, in exchange for sukuk and cash.

A royal commission of inquiry into the fund's management between 2014 and 2020 was appointed in January 2022, chaired by former chief justice Md Raus Sharif. The commission concluded that the fund would have recorded a net loss of RM1.4 billion for 2017 under full accounting standards instead of the RM3.4 billion profit it reported. It traced the crisis to profit distributions paid beyond the fund's means, an asset valuation method that inflated reported profits, weak external audit, an expanded investment mandate and a growing hajj subsidy burden.

The commission's report was submitted in August 2022 but stayed classified until 29 July 2026, when the government released it and ordered enforcement agencies to investigate its findings. Its recommendations included a bar on active politicians serving on the board, divided ministerial oversight between the religious affairs and finance portfolios, and forensic audits of 14 investments.

== Subsidiaries ==
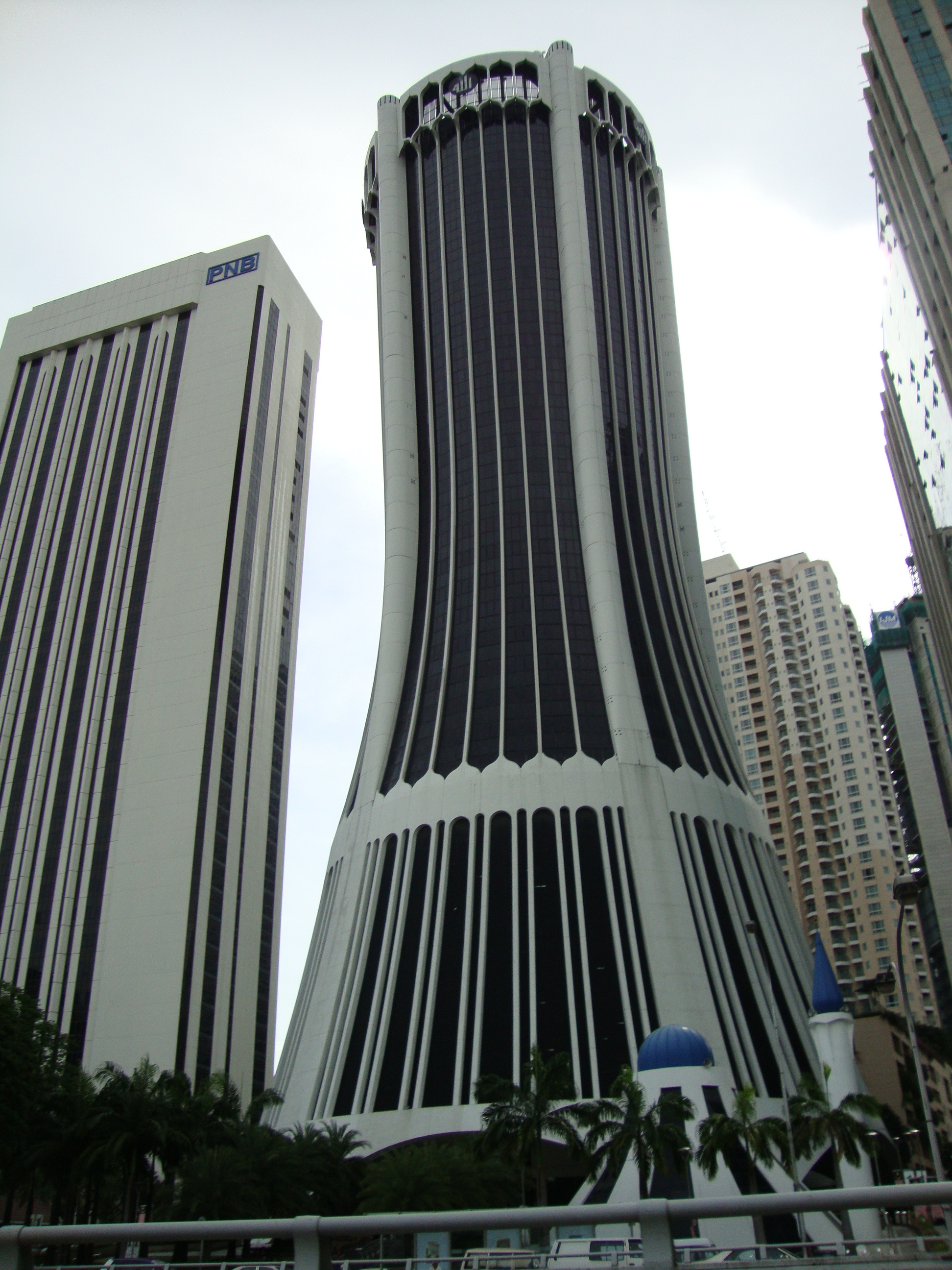
The main headquarters of Tabung Haji at Jalan Tun Razak, Kuala Lumpur, Malaysia.

=== Financial Institution ===
1. BIMB Holdings Berhad
  1. Bank Islam Malaysia Berhad
  2. Takaful Malaysia Berhad
  3. BIMB Securities

=== Services ===
1. TH International Sdn Bhd

=== Hospitality ===
1. TH Hotel & Residence Sdn Bhd
  1. TH Global Sdn Bhd
  2. TH Travel & Services Sdn Bhd

=== Property Development and Construction ===
1. TH Properties Sdn Bhd
2. LTH Property Investment (L) Inc.
3. LTH Property Holdings Limited
4. LTH Property Holdings 2 Limited

=== Plantation ===
1. TH Plantations Berhad
2. TH Indo Industries Sdn Bhd
3. TH Indopalms Sdn Bhd
4. TH Estates (Holdings) Sdn Bhd
5. Deru Semangat Sdn Bhd

== Awards and accolades ==
Year	Award	Category	Result	Ref.
2023	Labaytum Awards	Best Service Category for Hajj Affairs Office	Won	
2023	Labaytum Awards	Best Hajj Guide Service and Programme	Won	
2024	Labaytum Awards	Best Service Category for Hajj Affairs Office	Won	
2025	Labaytum Awards	Diamond Award	Won	
2026	Labaytum Awards	Diamond Award	Won	
