= Indoor games and sports =

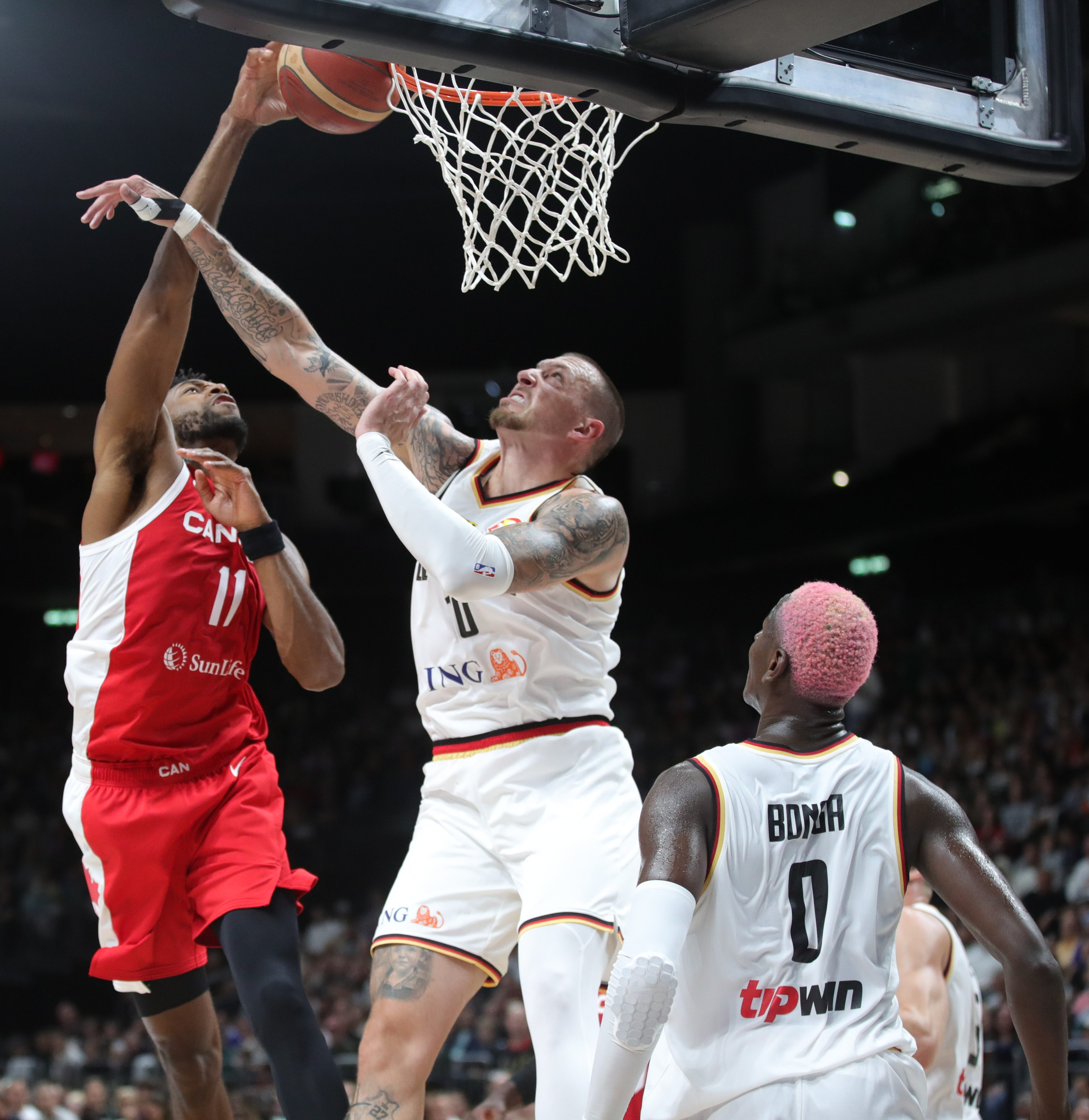

Indoor games and sports are a variety of structured games or competitive physical exercises, typically carried out either at home, in a well-sheltered building, or in a specially constructed sport venue such as a gym, a natatorium, an arena or a roofed stadium.

== Card games ==
Most card games are played with a pack of 52 playing cards, which are divided equally into four suits: spades, clubs, hearts and diamonds. Each suit has the numbers 2 to 10 followed by the picture cards – Jack, Queen and King – and the ace with a single pip. In some games the ace is treated as a 1, in others as better than a king. In English language packs, the picture cards are marked J, Q, K and the ace A.

Amongst the most popular card games are ‘trump-and-trick’ games, which include whist and bridge. In games of this kind the ace usually ranks highest, followed by the picture cards and number cards in descending order. One suit is made trumps, which means that cards of that suit beat any card of another suit. One player leads (plays the first card) and the others must follow suit (play a card of the same suit) if they can. Each round or trick is won by the highest card of the suit led, but if a player cannot follow suit, they may play a trump and the highest trump wins. The winner is the player or team that wins the most tricks.

Playing cards came to Europe from the Muslim world in the 14th century. At that time the suit signs were swords, batons, coins and cups, which are still used in some countries. India, China and Korea also have traditional packs of playing cards. The Indian ganjifa cards are usually round, and have 8, 10 12 cards each. Chinese playing cards are very small and narrower than European cards.

== Board games ==
Many different kinds of board games are played throughout the world, and many of them have been popular for hundreds of years. A few board games are decided by chance or luck alone, but most require some amount of skill on the part of the players. Games of pure chance are usually ‘race’ games, such as the children’s game snakes and ladders which was invented by Jaques. The winner – the player who reaches a certain square first – is decided by throwing numbered dice, over which the players have no control.

Games such as Monopoly and backgammon are a mixture of chance and skill. Even though luck (usually the throw of dice) plays a part, choices made by the players in the course of the game also help to decide the winner. Backgammon is one of the oldest board games that people still play. Its name comes from the Saxon (it means ‘back game’ because sometimes pieces have to go back to the beginning), but the Romans played this game too.

Luck plays little or no part in games of skill – the outcome is decided by the players’ ability to make the most advantageous moves available. Such games are often ‘war’ games, which involve capturing an opponent’s pieces. The most popular of all such games today is chess. Chess is a game of great skill that calls for the ability to plan moves and recognize threats several steps ahead. Each player has an ‘army’ of 16 pieces with which to fight a battle. There are six different kinds of piece – king, queen, bishop, knight, rook and pawn – and each has its own special way of moving about the board. If a player moves onto a square occupied by an opposing piece, that piece is captured and removed from the board. The object of the game is to trap (checkmate) the enemy king by putting it in a position where it cannot escape.

== Cue sports ==
Various indoor games, including billiards, snooker and pool, are played on a large, flat, cloth-covered table with six pockets. In these games, each of the two players tries to pot the balls (knock them into the pockets) by striking them with a cue-ball, which is hit with the tip of a stick called a cue.

In billiards, there are just three balls: a white cue-ball for each player and one red ball. Points are scored by potting the balls, by sending the cue-ball into a pocket ‘in off’ one of the other balls, or by getting the cue-ball to hit both the other balls (a cannon). The winner is the player who reaches an agreed score first, or who has the highest score after a certain time.

In snooker there are 22 balls: 1 cue-ball, 15 reds and 6 colours. A player must first pot one of the red balls (scoring 1 point) and then one of the colours, which are worth between 2 points (yellow) and 7 (black). The colour ball is put back on the table, and the player tries to put another red. The turn or break continues until the player fails to score or plays a foul shot. When all the reds have gone, the colours are potted in sequence from yellow to black, which marks the end of the game or frame. The winner of the frame is the player with the most points. Most professional matches are decided over a fixed number of frames.

== Indoor sports ==
Indoor sports complexes are springing up around the United States (ex: South Shore Sports Complex in Oceanside, NY). These complexes often provide a Turf Field that allows a wide variety of typically outdoor sports to be played indoors. These turf fields are large and has a grassy texture to it without the maintenance required to keep it green and plush. Many sports are being played on this type of service, such as soccer, baseball, flag football, shooting softball, lacrosse, rugby, and many others.

== Attendances ==
The indoor sports clubs with an average home league attendance of at least 20,000 in the 2024-25 or 2025 season:

#	Club	Sport	Country	Average
1	Club de hockey Canadien	Ice hockey	Canada	21,105
2	North Carolina Tar Heels	Basketball	United States	20,521
3	Kentucky Wildcats	Basketball	United States	20,334
4	Chicago Bulls	Basketball	United States	20,138
5	Tennessee Volunteers	Basketball	United States	20,026
6	Dallas Mavericks	Basketball	United States	20,079
