= TH Plantations =

Malaysian palm oil company

TH Plantations Berhad
- Formerly: Perbadanan Ladang-Ladang Tabung Haji Sendirian Berhad
- Company type: Publicly traded state-owned enterprise
- Traded as: MYX: 5112
- ISIN: MYL5112OO007
- Industry: Plantation
- Founded: 1972
- Headquarters: Tingkat 23, Bangunan TH Selborn, No. 153, Jalan Tun Razak, 50400 Kuala Lumpur, Malaysia
- Key people: Ab. Aziz Kasim, Chairman; Zainal Azwar Zainal Aminuddin, Chief Executive Officer
- Parent: Tabung Haji (73.83%)
- Website: www.thplantations.my

TH Plantations Berhad (THP; MYX: 5112) is a Malaysian palm oil company. It was established in 1972. It has major activity in Indonesia. Its chairman is Yusof Basiran. There was fire on its land in 2013. It is owned at 73.83% by the government-run Tabung Haji (2016). A notable director is Dato' Noordin bin Md Noor, who has long-standing activity in politics.

In 2007, most of its 200,000 ha of its allocated plantation land in Riau was on peat soil.
