= SPICE Arena =

Multipurpose indoor arena in the Malaysian state of Penang

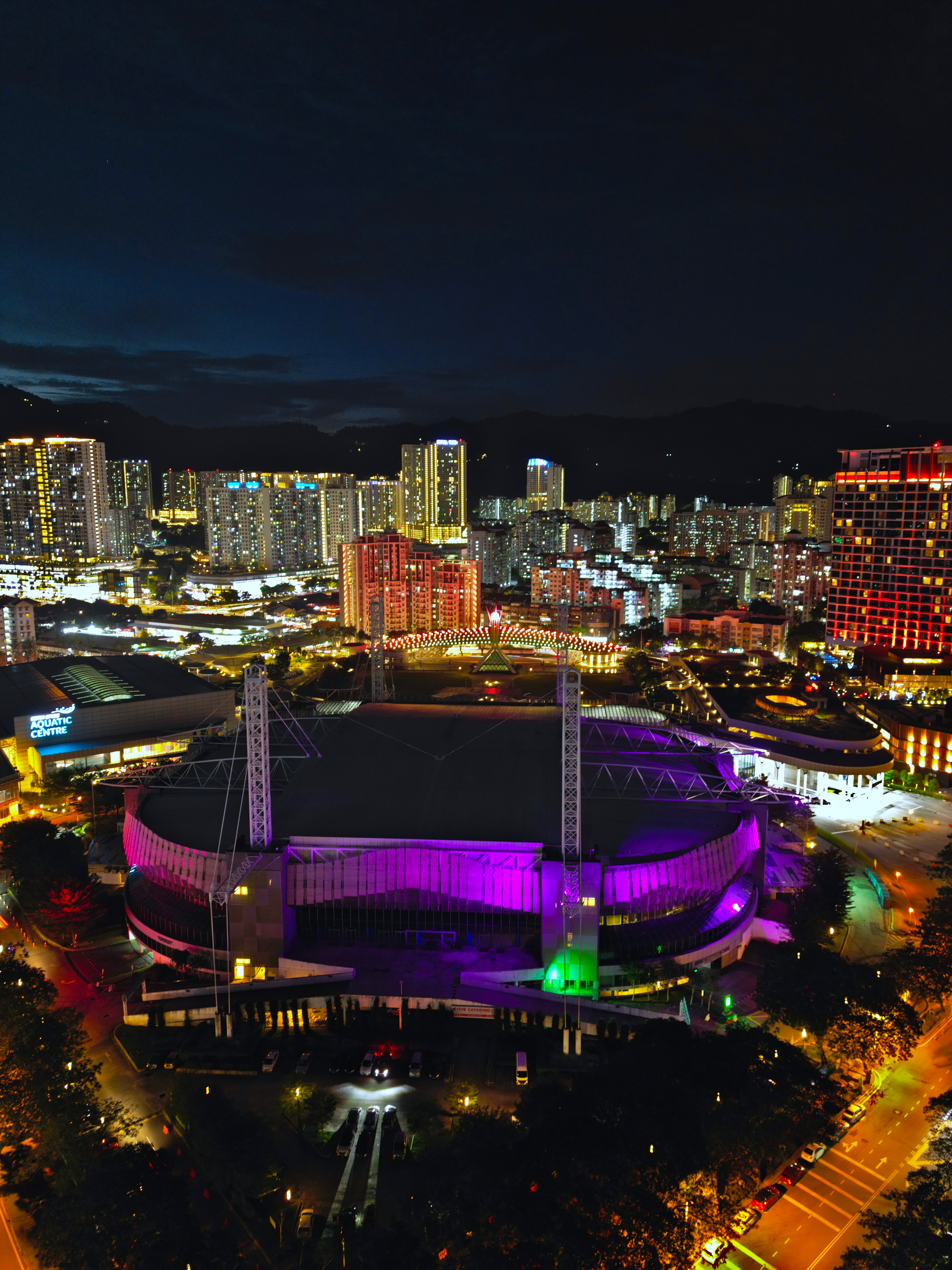
- Interactive map of SPICE Arena
- Former names: Penang International Sports Arena
- Address: 108, Jalan Tun Dr Awang, 11900 Bayan Lepas; George Town; Malaysia
- Coordinates: 5°19′42″N 100°16′51″E
- Owner: Penang Island City Council
- Operator: S P Setia
- Capacity: 18,000
- Type: Multipurpose arena
- Field size: 256 ft (78 m) x 130 ft (40 m)
- Acreage: 6.84 acres (2.77 ha)
- Public transit: 302, 303, 304, 308 401E

Construction
- Opened: 1997; 29 years ago
- Renovated: 2016; 10 years ago

SPICE Arena is a multipurpose indoor arena in George Town within the Malaysian state of Penang. Situated within the suburb of Bayan Lepas, it contains 80,000 sq ft (7,400 m^{2}) of event space and is touted as the largest arena in northern Malaysia.

Originally named the Penang International Sports Arena (abbrev. PISA), the arena was completed in 1997 ahead of the 2000 Sukma Games and the 2001 SEA Games. The venue was plaqued with issues related to poor design and maintenance. In 2011, Malaysian property developer S P Setia was awarded a project to redevelop the arena, with modifications completed by 2016. Now a component of Setia SPICE, the arena is used for sports events, concerts and conventions.

== History ==
Proposals for the construction of an indoor sports arena at Bayan Lepas had been suggested in the early 1990s. The 25.4-acre (10.3 ha) PISA was subsequently built by the Penang Island Municipal Council (now Penang Island City Council) at a cost of RM102.5 million, supported by a subsidy of RM20 million from the Malaysian federal government. The complex, which included an indoor sports arena and an aquatics centre, was completed in November 1997. Local company Maxifield was awarded the tender to operate the complex.

As early as 1998, design deficiencies at PISA were already identified, resulting in an expenditure of RM4 million by Maxifield to upgrade the facility in preparation for the 2000 Sukma Games, which were hosted by Penang. Following financial difficulties faced by Maxifield in 1999, the municipal government appointed Penevents, a subsidiary of the Penang Development Corporation, as the new operator of the complex. Design issues persisted, however, leading to complaints of inadequate seating amenities during the Sukma Games.

PISA was one of the venues for the 2001 SEA Games, hosting events such as judo and wushu. Following the Games, the complex reportedly fell into disrepair. The municipal government estimated that RM25 million was required for extensive repairs to the facilities.

=== Renovation ===
After the 2008 state election, the new Pakatan Rakyat-led state government requested proposals to redevelop PISA. In 2011, Malaysian property developer S P Setia secured a 30-year concession from the municipal government to build and operate the complex, which was subsequently renamed Setia SPICE. The redevelopment project was valued at RM300 million, but the municipal government was only obligated to invest a nett amount of RM11.5 million due to cost savings from the open tender process. In addition, S P Setia received planning approval to build Setia V Residences at Gurney Drive, as part of an additional 1,500 residential units exceeding the density limit of its existing and future projects in the state.

By 2016, upgrades to the SPICE Arena, part of the Setia SPICE complex, were complete. Modifications were made to the roof, façade, and air conditioning, chiller and surveillance systems. A covered walkway now links the arena with the adjacent SPICE Convention Centre.

SPICE Arena also served as the first mass vaccination centre in Penang during the COVID-19 pandemic.

== See also ==
- Dewan Sri Pinang
- Unifi Arena
