= Takaful Malaysia =

Malaysian company

Syarikat Takaful Malaysia Keluarga Berhad
- Company type: Public limited company
- Traded as: MYX: 6139
- ISIN: MYL6139OO009
- Industry: Takaful
- Founded: 29 November 1984; 41 years ago
- Headquarters: Menara Takaful Malaysia, No. 4, Jalan Sultan Sulaiman, 50000 Kuala Lumpur, Malaysia
- Key people: Dato’ Charon Wardini Mokhzani (Chairman); Nor Azman Zainal (Group CEO)
- Products: Family Takaful
- Revenue: RM3.76 billion (2022)
- Total assets: RM13.65 billion (2022)
- Parent: Tabung Haji (30.80%); Employees Provident Fund (18.64%); Kumpulan Wang Persaraan (Diperbadankan) (6.44%)
- Website: www.takaful-malaysia.com.my

Syarikat Takaful Malaysia Am Berhad
- Industry: Takaful
- Founded: 12 September 2017; 8 years ago
- Headquarters: Menara Takaful Malaysia, No. 4, Jalan Sultan Sulaiman, 50000 Kuala Lumpur, Malaysia
- Key people: Ismail Mahbob (Chairman); Mohamed Sabri Ramli (CEO)
- Products: General Takaful
- Revenue: RM1.20 billion (2022)
- Total assets: RM2.87 billion (2022)
- Parent: Syarikat Takaful Malaysia Keluarga Berhad (100%)
- Website: www.takaful-malaysia.com.my

Syarikat Takaful Malaysia Keluarga Berhad (Takaful Malaysia) is the first takaful operator in Malaysia. Takaful Malaysia Keluarga is the holding company that manages the Family Takaful business and owns 100% equity of Syarikat Takaful Malaysia Am Berhad (Takaful Malaysia Am), which operates the General Takaful business. Providing a comprehensive and affordable range of family takaful and general takaful solutions, both companies operate under the Takaful Malaysia brand with a combined network of branches in 24 locations nationwide. In addition, Takaful Malaysia has two subsidiary companies in Indonesia, P.T. Asuransi Takaful Keluarga and P.T. Syarikat Takaful Indonesia.

== History ==
- Takaful Malaysia was established on 29 November 1984 when the Government of Malaysia set up a task force to study the feasibility of establishing an Islamic insurance company in Malaysia.
- The incorporation of Takaful Malaysia as the first takaful operator in the country was in the same year as the Takaful Act was enacted.
- Takaful Malaysia commenced its operations on 22 July 1985.
- Takaful Malaysia was converted into a public limited company on 19 October 1995, followed by its listing on the Main Board (now known as ‘Main Market’) of Bursa Malaysia Securities Berhad on 30 July 1996.
- In accordance with the Islamic Financial Services Act 2013 (“IFSA”), Takaful Malaysia separated its composite license into two licensed entities on 1 June 2018.
- The current substantial shareholders of Takaful Malaysia are Lembaga Tabung Haji, Employees Provident Fund Board and Kumpulan Wang Persaraan (Diperbadankan), with a shareholding of 28.20%, 12.73% and 6.88%, respectively, as at 31 March 2023.

== Awards ==
- Graduates’ Choice of Employer to Work For in 2022 - Graduates’ Choice Award
- HR Asia Best Companies to Work For in Asia 2022 (Malaysia Edition)
- Highest Growth in Profit After Tax Over Three Years (Financial Services Sector) - The Edge Billion Ringgit Club Corporate Awards 2022
- Most Outstanding Company in Malaysia (Insurance Sector Category) - Asiamoney Asia's Outstanding Companies Poll 2022
- iBanding.com Best Motor Takaful Company in Malaysia 2021/2022
- HR Asia Best Companies to Work For in Asia 2021 (Malaysia Edition)
- Most Attractive Graduate Employers to Work For in 2022 (Insurance Category) - Graduate's Choice Awards 2021/2022
- Highest Returns to Shareholders Over Three Years Award (Financial Services Sector) - The Edge Billion Ringgit Club Corporate Awards 2020
- Highest Return on Equity Over Three Years Award (Financial Services Sector) - The Edge Billion Ringgit Club Corporate Awards 2020
- Highest Return on Equity Over Three Years Award (Financial Services Sector) - The Edge Billion Ringgit Club Corporate Awards 2019
- Highest Growth in Profit After Tax Over Three Years Award (Financial Services Sector) - The Edge Billion Ringgit Club Corporate Awards 2019
- The Malaysian Takaful Association's Innovation Award (Special Awards Category) - Takaful StarNite Awards 2019
- The Malaysian Takaful Association's Race For Cover Award - Takaful StarNite Awards 2019
- Highest Return on Equity Over Three Years (Financial Services Sector) - Runner-up - The Edge Billion Ringgit Club Corporate Awards 2018
- Highest Growth in Profit After Tax Over Three Years (Financial Services Sector) - Runner-up - The Edge Billion Ringgit Club Corporate Awards 2018
- Top Three Best Employer Brand (Insurance Category) - Graduates’ Choice Awards 2018
- National ICT Association of Malaysia (PIKOM) - Project Leadership Certification (PLC) Annual Leadership Award 2018
- iBanding.com Best Motor Takaful Company in Malaysia 2017/2018
