= Ampang Park station =

Ampang Park station may refer to:

- Ampang Park LRT station, part of the LRT Kelana Jaya Line, in Kuala Lumpur
- Ampang Park MRT station, part of the MRT Putrajaya Line, in Kuala Lumpur
