= S P Setia =

Malaysian property development company

S P Setia Berhad
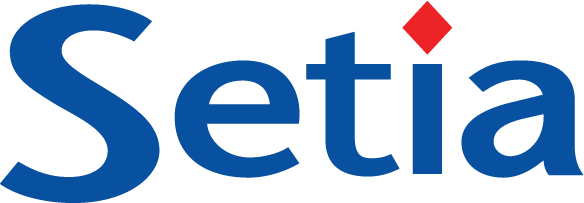
- Type: Publicly traded state-owned enterprise
- Traded as: MYX: 8664
- ISIN: MYL8664OO004
- Industry: Real estate development
- Founded: 1974
- Founder: Liew Kee Sin
- Headquarters: Setia Alam, Shah Alam, Selangor, Malaysia
- Key people: Syed Anwar Jamalullail, Chairman; Choong Kai Wai, President and CEO
- Parent: Permodalan Nasional Berhad
- Website: spsetia.com

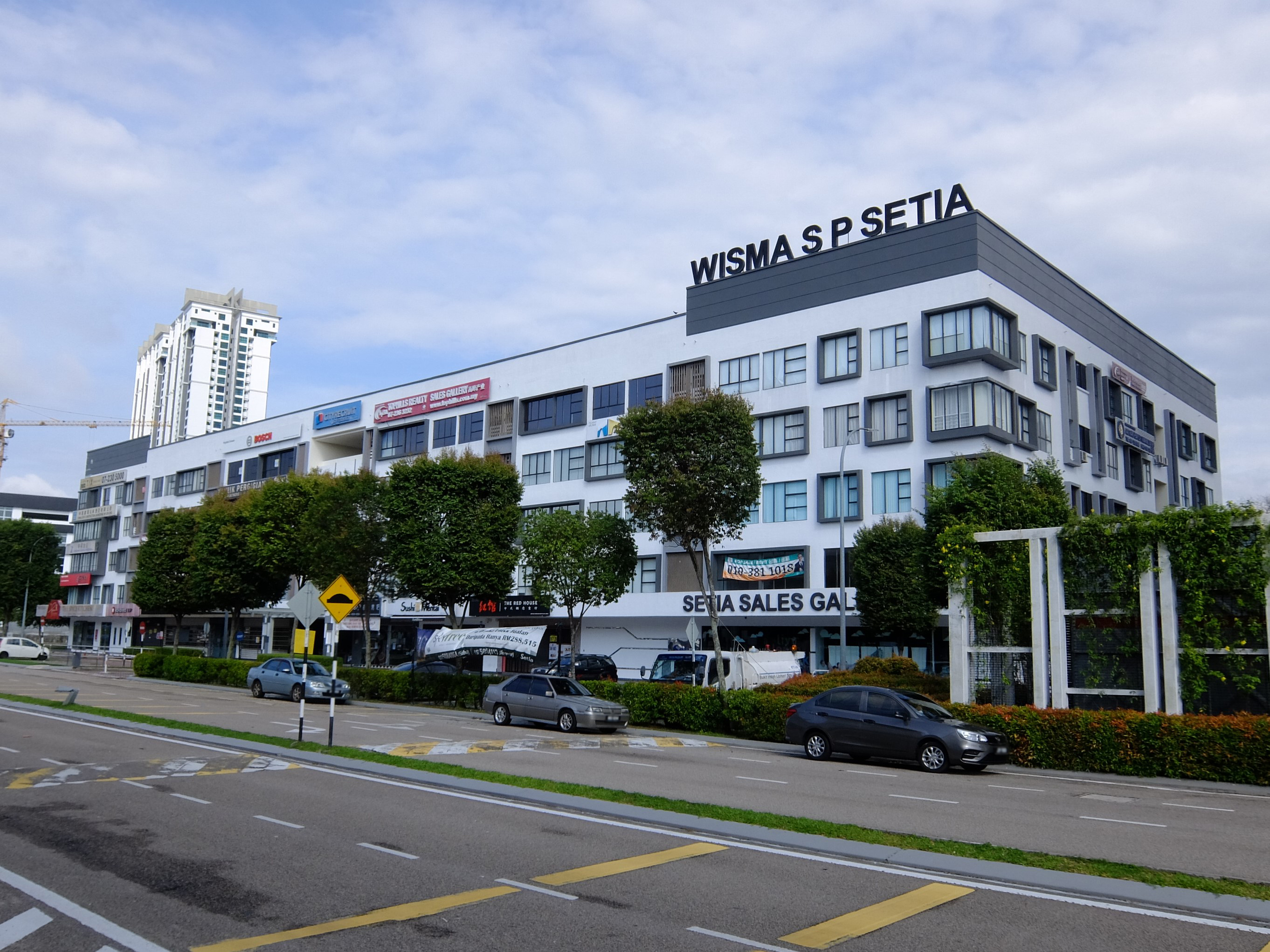
SP Setia branch office in Iskandar Puteri, Johor

S P Setia Berhad (formerly Syarikat Pembinaan Setia Berhad) (MYX: 8664) is a Malaysian publicly traded company whose primary business is in property development. It is the largest such company, by sales, in Malaysia. Its other businesses include construction, infrastructure, wood-based manufacturing, and trading. Its portfolio comprises townships, residential high-rises, commercial and retail as well as mixed-use development projects.

== History ==
The group started out in 1974 as a construction company which was later led by a well-known property development figure, Liew Kee Sin in 1990 and was eventually listed on Bursa Malaysia in 1993. In 1996, S P Setia refocused its core business to property development with supporting businesses in construction and wood-based manufacturing.

In 2011/2012, Permodalan Nasional Berhad (PNB), Malaysia's state asset manager which was then under Tun Ahmad Sarji Abdul Hamid, took over S P Setia, joining the foray of acquisitions led by the government-linked companies in private property sector. Tan Sri Liew Kee Sin stepped down as the president and Chief Executive Officer (CEO) of S P Setia Berhad in 2014 and joined Eco World Development Group Bhd as a non-independent & non-executive director.

== Operations and corporate affairs ==
S P Setia currently has a presence in the three key economic regions of Malaysia, namely Klang Valley, Johor and Penang, as well as in Kota Kinabalu, Sabah. Internationally, S P Setia's projects are present in Vietnam, Australia, Singapore, the United Kingdom, China and the most recent one being in Japan.

The company employs approximately 1,800 people.

S P Setia's charitable trust, Setia Foundation, was established in 2000 with the objective of lending a helping hand to underprivileged individuals and charities in the areas of education, general welfare, and medical assistance. In the year 2015, S P Setia Foundation embarked on a mission to adopt schools housing underprivileged students in rural areas. To date, S P Setia Foundation has successfully adopted nine schools located in Selangor, Penang and Johor.

As of 1 October 2021, S P Setia is spearheaded by Datuk Choong Kai Wai, President and CEO and Dato' Seri Koe Peng Kang, Deputy President and COO, following the retirement of Dato' Khor Chap Jen and Datuk Wong Tuck Wai.

On 9 February 2022, S P Setia Bhd, through its subsidiary Setia HC Ventures Sdn Bhd, has signed an agreement with Qualitas Medical Group Sdn Bhd (Qualitas) to jointly develop and operate an Ambulatory Care Centre (ACC) in Setia Alam, Shah Alam.

== Notable projects ==
=== Malaysia ===
- Setia Alam in Shah Alam, Selangor
  - Setia Alam Highway
- Alam Impian in Shah Alam, Selangor
- KL Eco City, Kuala Lumpur
- Setia V Residences in George Town, Penang
- Setia SPICE in George Town, Penang
- Setia Tropika in Johor Bahru, Johor
- Setia Indah in Johor Bahru, Johor
- Aeropod in Kota Kinabalu, Sabah
  - Western Sabah Railway Line

=== International ===
- Redevelopment of the Battersea Power Station site, and the Northern line extension to Battersea, London (as part of a conglomerate)
