= Setia V Residences =

Condominium in George Town, Penang, Malaysia

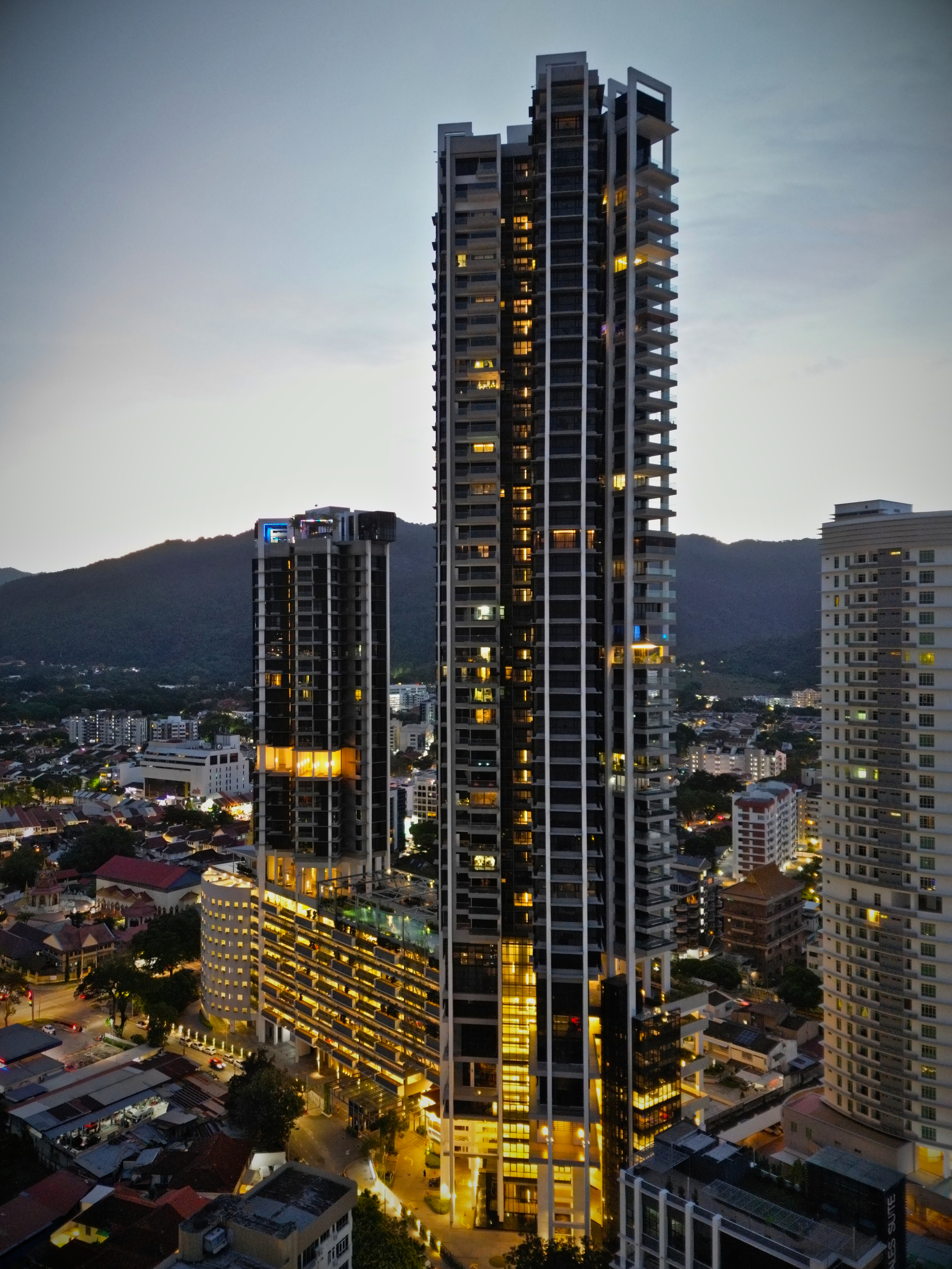
- Tower B (left) and Tower A (right)

General information
- Type: Condominium
- Location: Burmah Lane, 10350 George Town, Penang, Malaysia, George Town, Penang, Malaysia
- Coordinates: 5.433°N 100.314824°E
- Completed: 2017
- Owner: S P Setia

Height
- Roof: A: 181.24 m (594.6 ft); B: 120.83 m (396.4 ft)
- Top floor: A: 181.24 m (594.6 ft); B: 120.83 m (396.4 ft)

Technical details
- Floor count: A: 48; B: 32

Setia V Residences is a residential complex within George Town in the Malaysian state of Penang. Located at Gurney Drive within the city's Central Business District (CBD), it consists of a pair of skyscrapers, Tower A and Tower B, with 48 and 32 stories respectively. Tower B has an estimated height of 120.83 m (396.4 ft). Tower A, with a height of 190.8 m (626 ft), remains as one of the tallest skyscrapers in George Town.

The complex has a total of 166 residential units, with areas ranging from 2,624 to 7,119 sq ft (243.8 to 661.4 m^{2}). Units were sold between RM 1.95 million and RM 7.47 million (US$ 465,000 and US$1.79 million)

The residential complex sits at a 1.8 acres (0.73 ha) site of the former campus of Tenby School (Sri Inai School), a private school based in Penang, founded in the 1980s. This site, under the acquirement of S P Setia, a Malaysian property development firm, was redeveloped in 2011. The original campus of Tenby School was subsequently demolished later that year. Both Tower A and B topped out in 2016 while the complex was fully completed in late-2017.

== See also ==
- List of tallest buildings in George Town
- Gurney Drive
