= Kampung Siam, Penang =

Kampung Siam
- Ethnic enclave in George Town
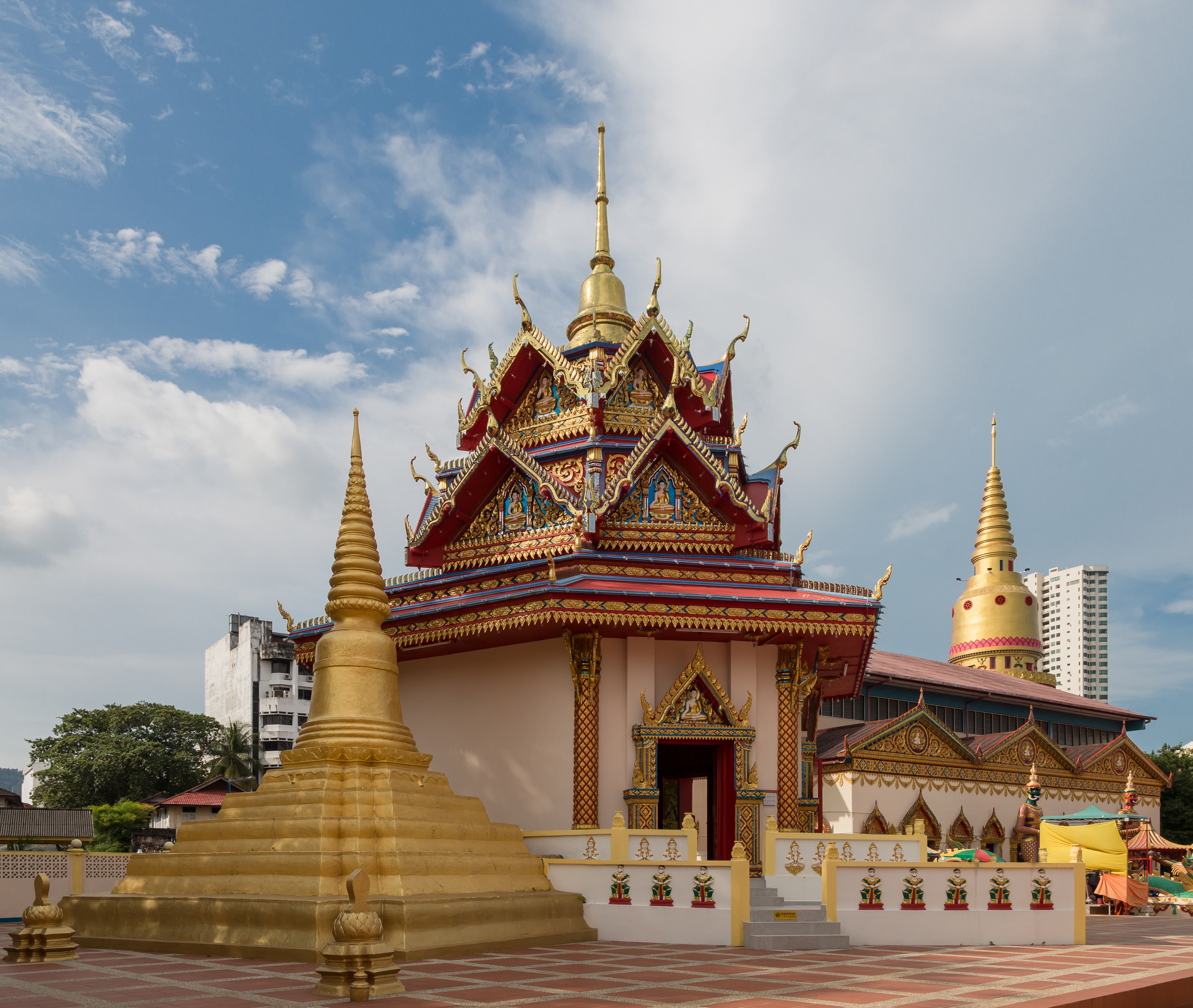
- Wat Chaiyamangkalaram

- Location within George Town in Penang
- Coordinates: 5°25′52.1862″N 100°18′46.944″E
- Country: Malaysia
- State: Penang
- City: George Town
- District: Northeast
- Time zone: UTC+8 (MST)
  - Summer (DST): Not observed
- Postal code: 10250

Kampong Siam is an ethnic Siamese enclave within the downtown core of George Town in the Malaysian state of Penang. Located within the city centre, the 2,681 m^{2} (0.662-acre) neighbourhood is situated near the corner between Burmah Road and Burmah Lane, immediately adjacent to Wat Chaiyamangkalaram.

The neighbourhood was formerly inhabited by ethnic Siamese, who had moved into the area as early as the 19th century. However, most of the original Siamese residents had since relocated to other areas in the city, following the redevelopment of Kampong Siam into a modern neighbourhood in the late 1990s. Despite the urbanisation, the neighbourhood still retains some of its Siamese characteristics and is home to many Siamese temples and businesses.

== History ==
The first Siamese settlers were believed to have arrived at Pulau Tikus in the early 19th century. According to a census conducted in 1828, as many as 1,117 ethnic Siamese were residing within Kampung Siam. In 1845, the land where Kampung Siam now stands was granted by the British authorities to the ethnic Siamese as a gesture of goodwill to Siam. The four female Siamese trustees who became custodians of the land also built Wat Chaiyamangkalaram next to the village.

Towards the end of the 20th century, Kampong Siam was earmarked for redevelopment, drawing objections and protests by the Siamese community. Eventually the settlement was completely bulldozed by 1994; commercial complexes and condominiums now stand at the site of the former Siamese settlement. However, some of the architecture and street names within the neighbourhood still bear Siamese influences, while the many Siamese temples, businesses, and social clubs remain based at the area.

== See also ==
- Wat Chayamangkalaram
- Wat Buppharam, Penang
- Malaysian Siamese
- Pulau Tikus
- Kampong Serani
- Ayer Rajah
