= Pulau Tikus =

- Neighbourhood of George Town
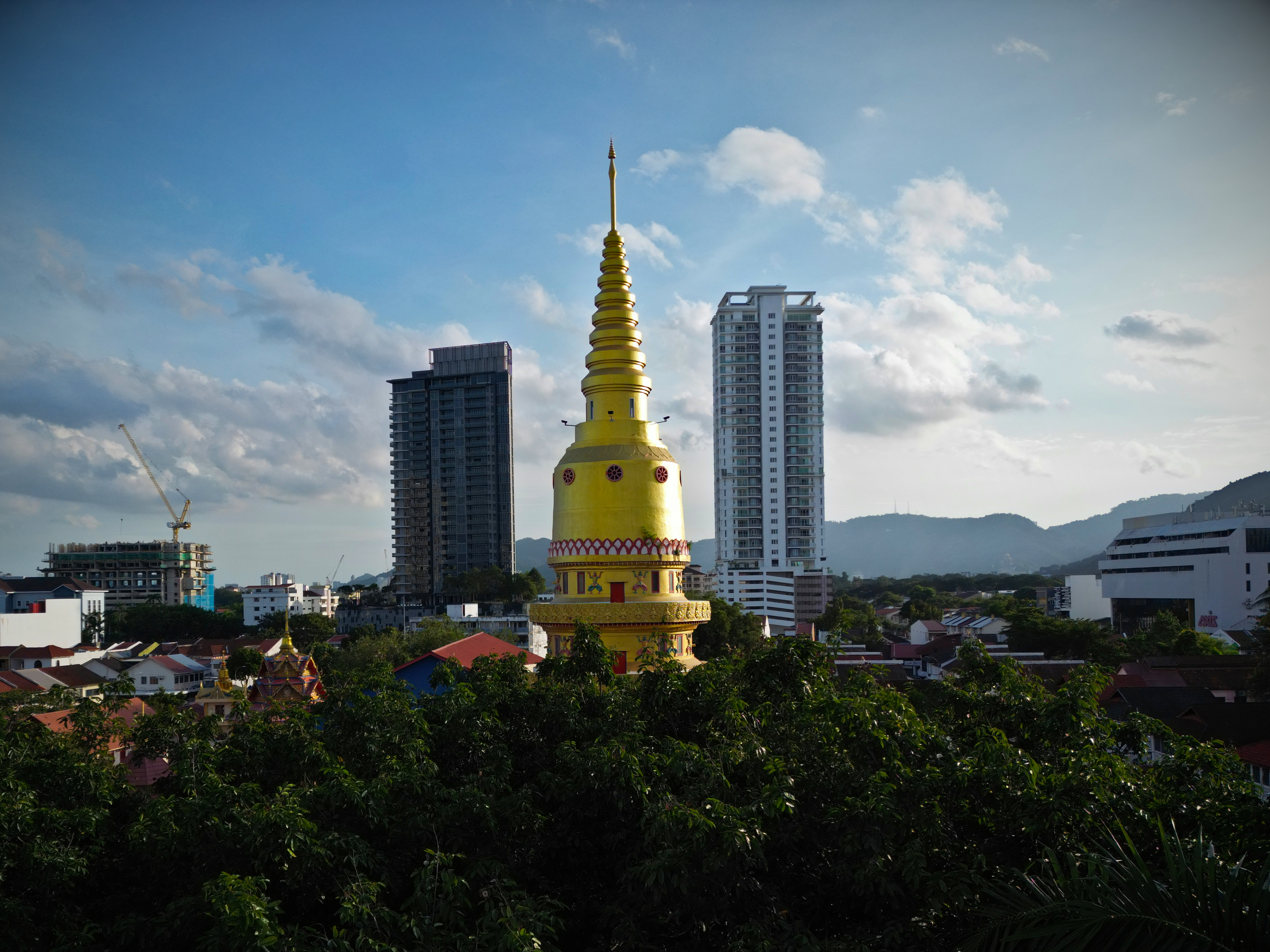

- Location within George Town in Penang
- Coordinates: 5°25′53.4″N 100°18′42.48″E
- Country: Malaysia
- State: Penang
- City: George Town
- District: Northeast
- Time zone: UTC+8 (MST)
  - Summer (DST): Not observed
- Postal code: 10250 to 104xx

Pulau Tikus is a neighbourhood within the downtown core of George Town in the Malaysian state of Penang. Named after a rock just off the coast of Penang Island, this upper class neighbourhood is home to Eurasian, Thai and Burmese communities.

Established soon after Captain Francis Light's founding of Penang Island in 1786, Pulau Tikus has been home to various cultures since the first days of British rule. The aforementioned communities have built impressive places of worship within Pulau Tikus, such as Catholic churches and Buddhist temples adorned with architectural designs of their native homelands.

In addition, a number of consulates have been established here.

== Etymology ==
Pulau Tikus was named after the actual Tikus Island (Malay: Pulau Tikus), a rocky islet just 770 m (0.48 miles) off the Tanjung Bungah suburb. The name Pulau Tikus, meaning 'Rat Island' in Malay, was said to have been derived from the islet's rocks and dunes, which looked like rats at low tide.

== History ==
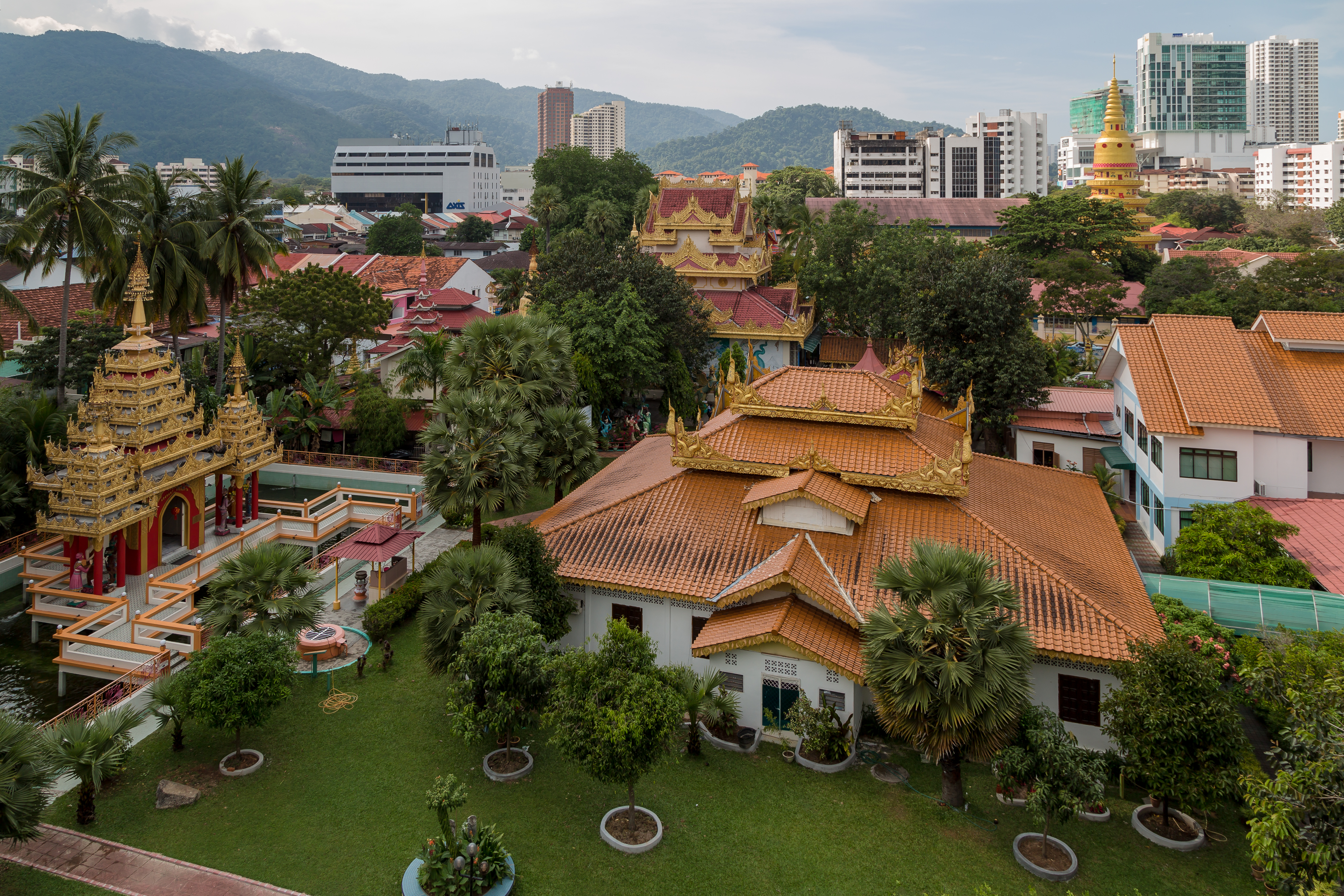
The Dhammikarama Burmese Temple, constructed in 1803, is the first Burmese Buddhist temple in Malaysia.

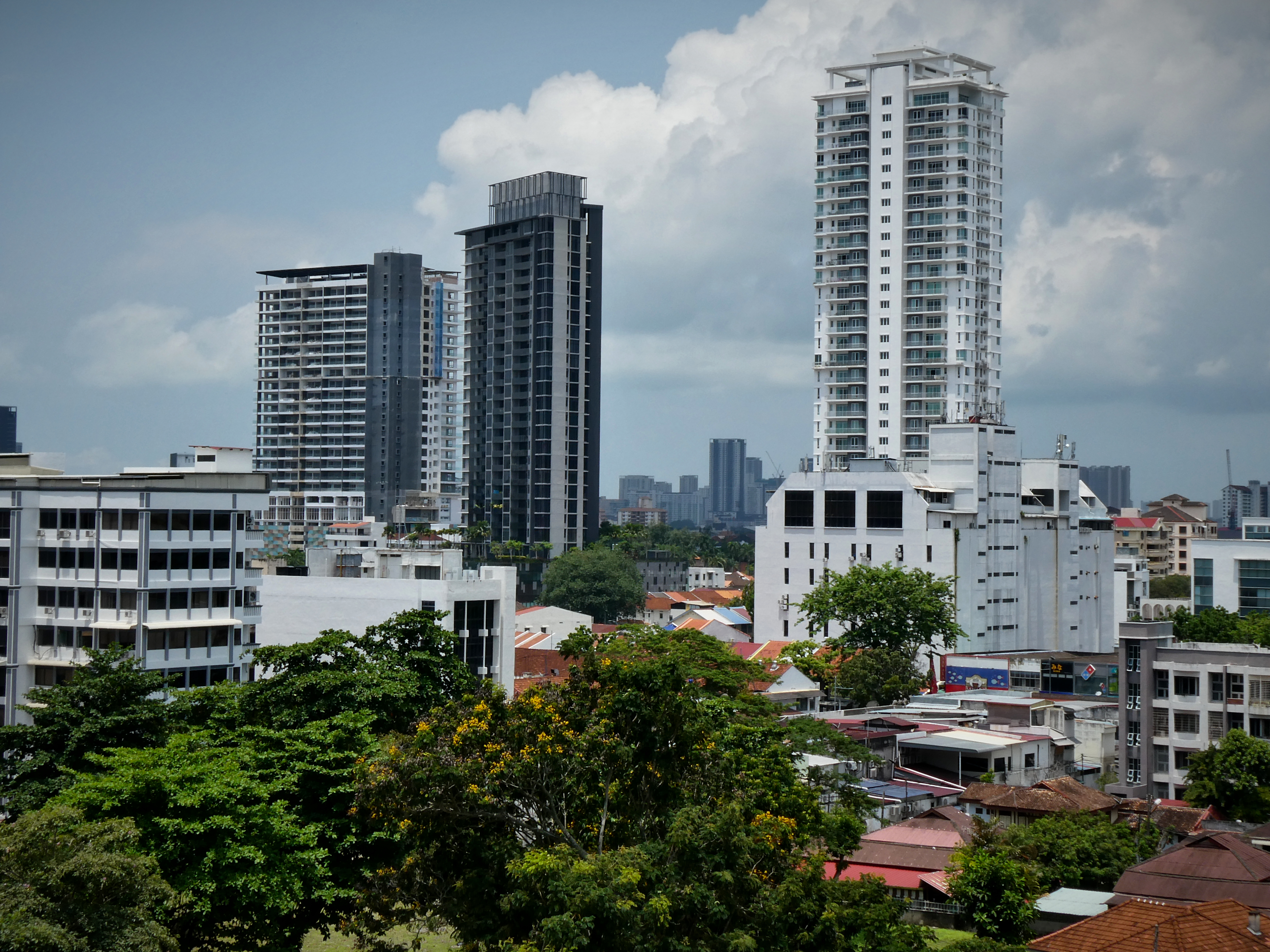
High-rises at Pulau Tikus

Pulau Tikus was first inhabited by the Eurasians, who were fleeing from persecution in Siam. The Eurasians, who were mostly Catholics, arrived at Pulau Tikus in 1811, following another group of Eurasians who had already settled within the city centre in 1786. It was the Eurasians who gave the place its name, Pulau Tikus. Upon arriving, they built Kampong Serani (Eurasian Village), centred around the Church of the Immaculate Conception.

The Burmese were also among the earliest settlers at Pulau Tikus. A Burmese village, Kampung Ava, was established in the early 19th century, as well as the Dhammikarama Burmese Temple, which was built in 1803. The Thais, who mainly resided at Kampung Siam, later built two more Buddhist temples at Pulau Tikus – Wat Chaiyamangkalaram and Wat Buppharam.

To the southwest, James Scott, a partner of Captain Francis Light, founded the Ayer Rajah Estate. As per the usual practice at the time, Indian labourers were brought in to work in the agricultural estates; the Indian community would eventually build a handful of Hindu temples here, such as Arulmigu Balathandayuthapani Temple and Nattukkottai Chettiar Temple.

The growth of George Town over the centuries eventually swallowed up Pulau Tikus, turning it into an afflient neighbourhood within the city centre. In recent decades, urbanisation has led to the mushrooming of upmarket condominiums and commercial properties within Pulau Tikus and the vicinity of Gurney Drive.

== Geography ==
Pulau Tikus properly starts near the junction of Burmah Road with Edgecombe Road, and ends just before the Bagan Jermal junction. Burmah Road forms the main artery through Pulau Tikus, with the heart of the neighbourhood at the intersection of Burmah Road with Cantonment Road.

== Transportation ==
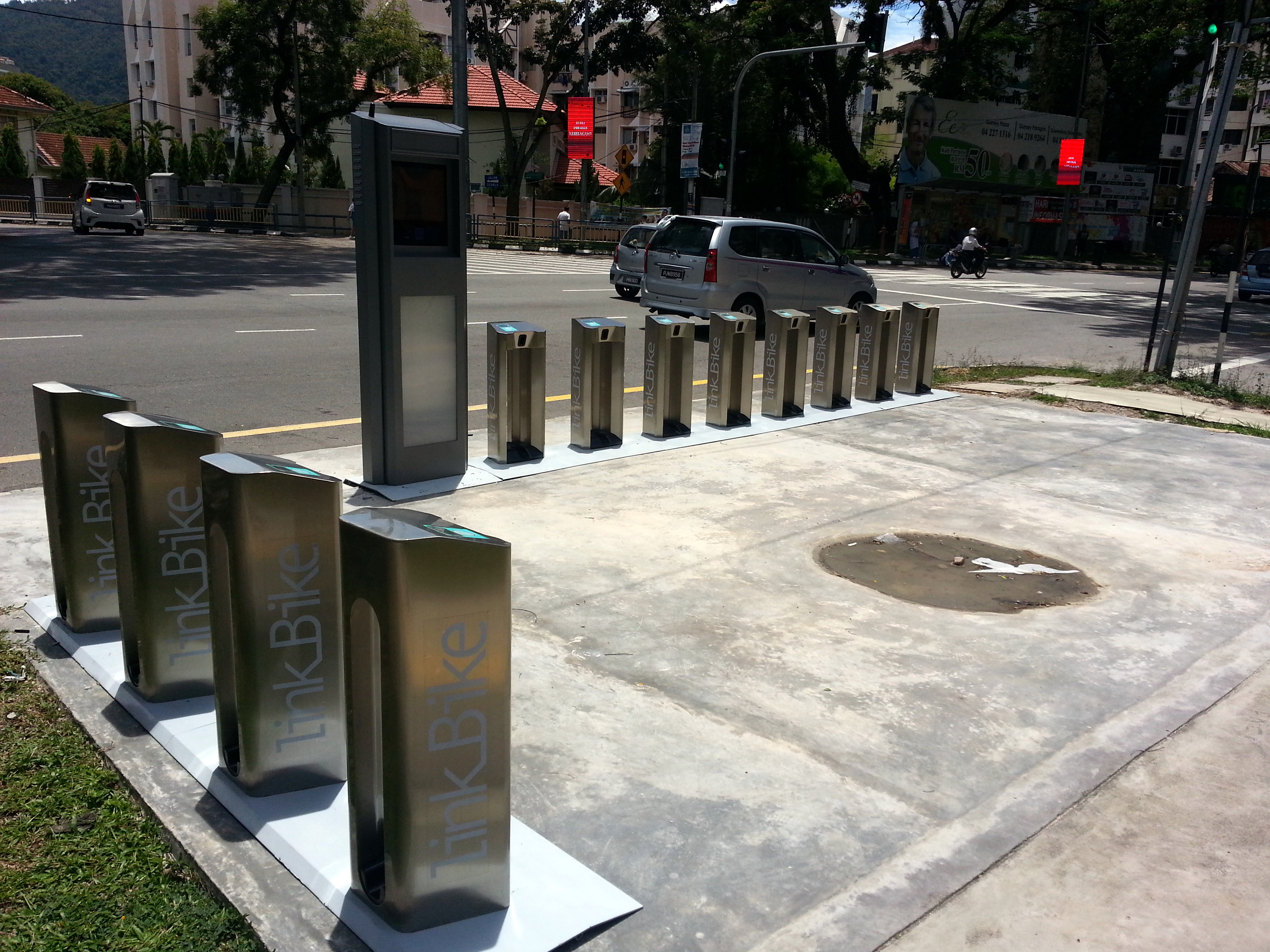
A LinkBike station at Kelawei Road

Among the main thoroughfares within Pulau Tikus are Burmah Road, Kelawei Road and Cantonment Road, with the intersection between Burmah Road and Cantonment Road forming the commercial hub of Pulau Tikus. In particular, both Burmah Road and Kelawei Road are heavily used by motorists. In 2013, the then Penang Island Municipal Council (now Penang Island City Council) converted several roads, including Burmah Road and Kelawei Road, into one-way streets in order to alleviate worsening traffic congestion.

Pulau Tikus is served by two of Rapid Penang's free-of-charge transit routes – namely the Pulau Tikus Loop (PTL) and the Congestion Alleviation Transport (CAT) Tanjung Tokong route. Aside from the PTL and the CAT, Rapid Penang's routes 101, 102, 103, 104 and 304 connect Pulau Tikus with various destinations in the city, including the Penang International Airport, Queensbay Mall, Batu Ferringhi and Teluk Bahang.

Another bus service that caters specifically to tourists is the Hop-On Hop-Off service, which utilises open-topped double-decker buses. The Hop-On Hop-Off service includes stops at Kelawei Road, allowing tourists to visit the Siamese and Burmese temples along the road, including Wat Chaiyamangkalaram and Dhammikarama Temple.

Efforts have also been made to improve pedestrianisation within Pulau Tikus, such as the tactile paving of the roadside pedestrian walkways for the visually-impaired, and the use of natural or man-made barriers between the road and the pedestrian walkway to improve the safety of pedestrians.

Other than that, LinkBike stations have been installed at Kelawei Road, enabling cyclists to rent bicycles to commute around the city.

== Education ==
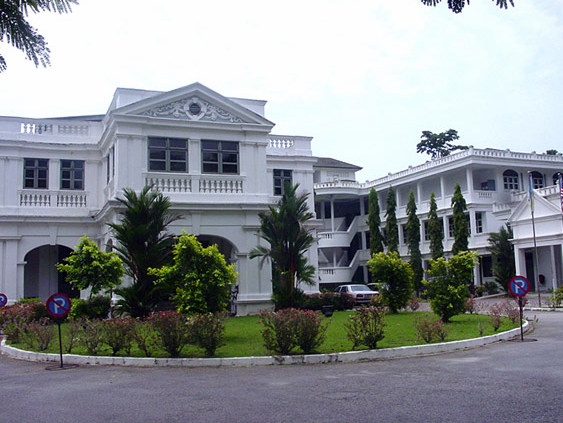
The main campus of DISTED College at Macalister Road

A total of three primary schools, four high schools and two private colleges are located within Pulau Tikus. In addition to these, an international primary school is also situated at Pulau Tikus, catering to the expatriate community within the neighbourhood.

Notably, Pulau Tikus is home to the Penang Chinese Girls' High School, one of the premier Chinese schools in Penang. Founded in 1919, this school at Gottlieb Road has retained the consistent academic performance of its students. In addition, Phor Tay Private High School, the first Buddhist school in Malaysia, is also situated at Jalan Bagan Jermal, along the western edge of Pulau Tikus.

The schools and colleges at Pulau Tikus are as listed below.

Primary schools

- Penang Chinese Girls' Primary School
- St. Xavier's Primary Branch School
- Convent Pulau Tikus Primary School

High schools

- Convent Pulau Tikus
- Penang Chinese Girls' High School
- Penang Chinese (Private) Girls' High School
- Phor Tay Private High School

International school

- St. Christopher's International Primary School

Private colleges

- DISTED College
- PTPL College

A nursing college operated by the Penang Adventist Hospital, the Adventist College of Nursing and Health Sciences, is situated at Burmah Road near the hospital itself.

== Health care ==
The Penang Adventist Hospital at Burmah Road is one of the more well-known private hospitals in Penang. Established in 1924, the hospital has since been relocated to its current grounds within Pulau Tikus. The hospital complex now includes the five-storey main building with 253 beds and an oncology centre, the latter of which contains radiation treatments. As of 2014, Penang Adventist Hospital received about 84,000 patients, 40% of whom were foreigners such as Indonesians.

== Shopping ==
There is a Bandar Baru supermarket, located within the Axis Complex at Cantonment Road, which offer more local products. Aside from the supermarket, the shopping malls along the nearby Gurney Drive, such as Gurney Plaza and Gurney Paragon, also cater to locals, expatriates and tourists alike.

== Consulates ==
- China
- Indonesia
- Thailand

== Neighbourhoods ==
- Ayer Rajah
- Kampong Serani
- Kampung Siam
