= Ayer Rajah, Penang =

Ayer Rajah
- Neighbourhood
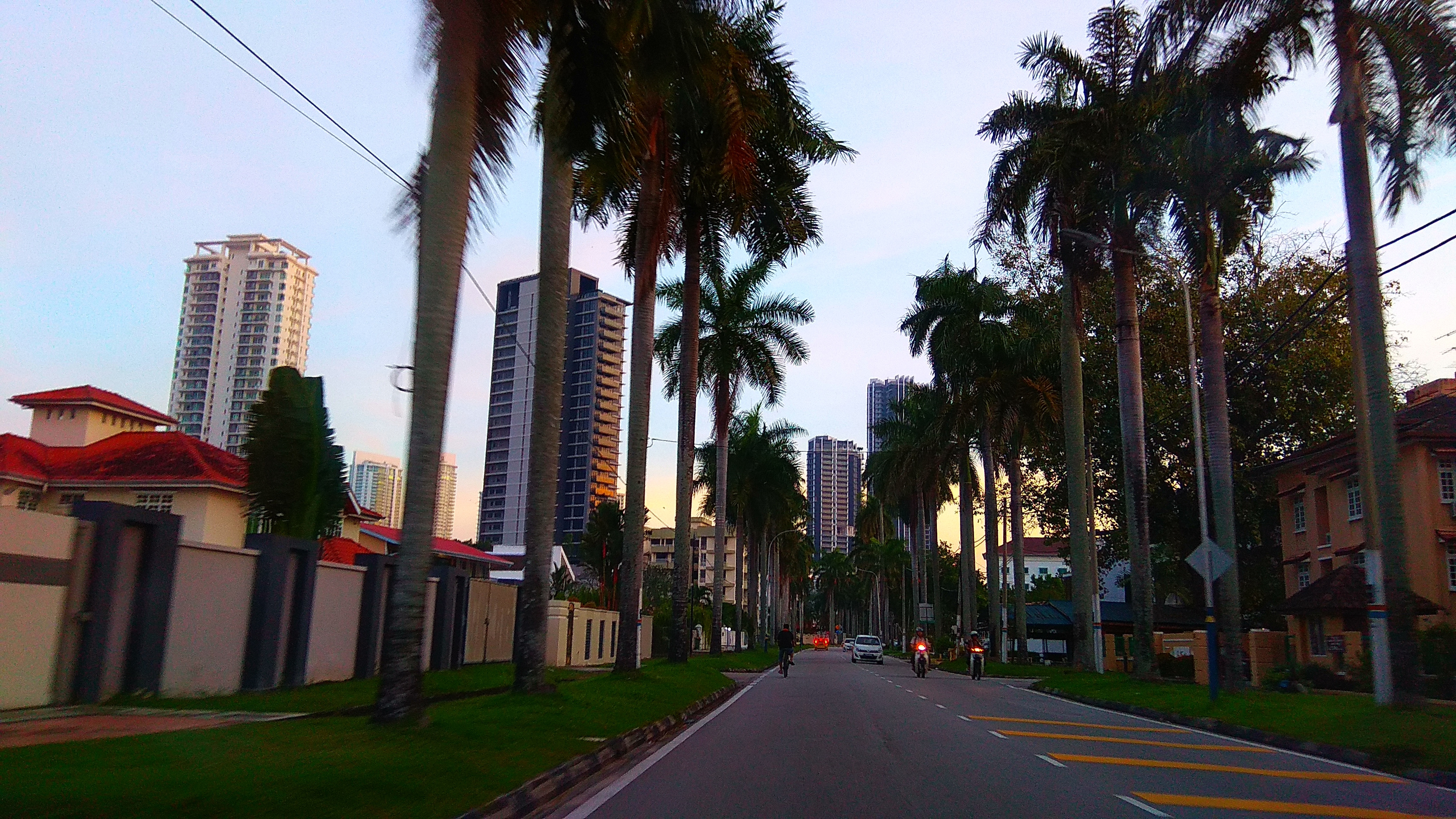

- Location within George Town in Penang
- Coordinates: 5°25′41.4618″N 100°18′11.4906″E
- Country: Malaysia
- State: Penang
- City: George Town
- District: Northeast
- Time zone: UTC+8 (MST)
  - Summer (DST): Not observed
- Postal code: 10350

Ayer Rajah is a residential neighbourhood within the downtown core of George Town in the Malaysian state of Penang. This leafy, affluent neighbourhood, situated adjacent to the Penang Botanic Gardens, mostly consists of landed properties such as bungalows and semi-detached houses, surrounded by tree-lined avenues.

== Etymology ==
Ayer Rajah was named after Ayer Rajah Bay, the northern bay of George Town which forms the city's northern shoreline and includes the present-day Gurney Drive.

== History ==
By 1796, 10 years after the establishment of George Town by Francis Light, more than 2,000 acres (8,100,000 m^{2}) of the area had been cleared, forming the Ayer Rajah Estate. The agricultural plantation, founded by Light's Scottish partners, David Brown and James Scott, was owned by the Brown and Scott families. In particular, Scott Road, which runs through the neighbourhood, was named after James Scott.

Other prominent personalities who once resided within this neighbourhood include the first Malaysian Prime Minister, Tunku Abdul Rahman, and local DAP politician-cum-lawyer, Karpal Singh.

== Transportation ==
The major thoroughfares within the neighbourhood include Ayer Rajah Road (now Jalan Tunku Abdul Rahman) and Brown Road. Western Road (Jalan Utama) forms the southern end of the neighbourhood, which is also bounded by Burmah Road to the north.

Rapid Penang bus route 10 includes a handful of stops along Gottlieb Road.

== Education ==
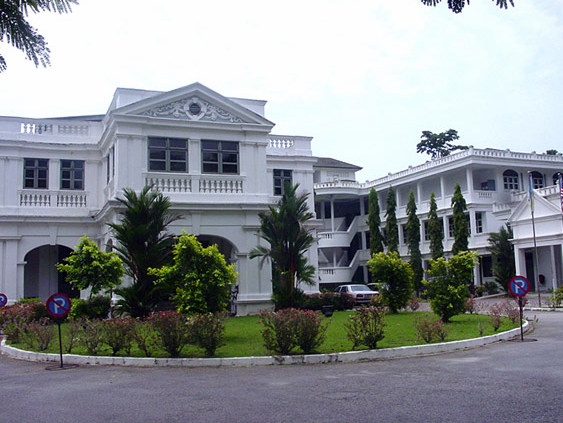
The main campus of DISTED College at Macalister Road

The neighbourhood is served by two primary schools, three high schools and two private colleges, as well as an international school.

Primary schools

- St. Xavier's Primary Branch School
- Penang Chinese Girls' Primary School

High schools

- Convent Pulau Tikus
- Penang Chinese Girls' High School
- Penang Chinese Girls' Private High School

International school

- St. Christopher's International Primary School

Private colleges

- DISTED College
- PTPL College

Aside from these institutions, the Adventist College of Nursing and Health Sciences, operated by the nearby Penang Adventist Hospital, is also situated at Burmah Road.

== Health care ==
The Penang Adventist Hospital, a major private hospital, is located at Burmah Road. Founded in 1924, the 253-bed hospital offers specialist treatments for a variety of medical conditions and has emerged as one of the more well-known hospitals among medical tourists in Penang.

== Consulates ==
Ayer Rajah is also home to a number of consulates.

- China: Ayer Rajah Road
- Indonesia: Burmah Road
- Thailand: Ayer Rajah Road

== See also ==
- Pulau Tikus
- Kampong Serani
- Kampung Siam
