= Kampong Serani =

- Neighbourhood of George Town
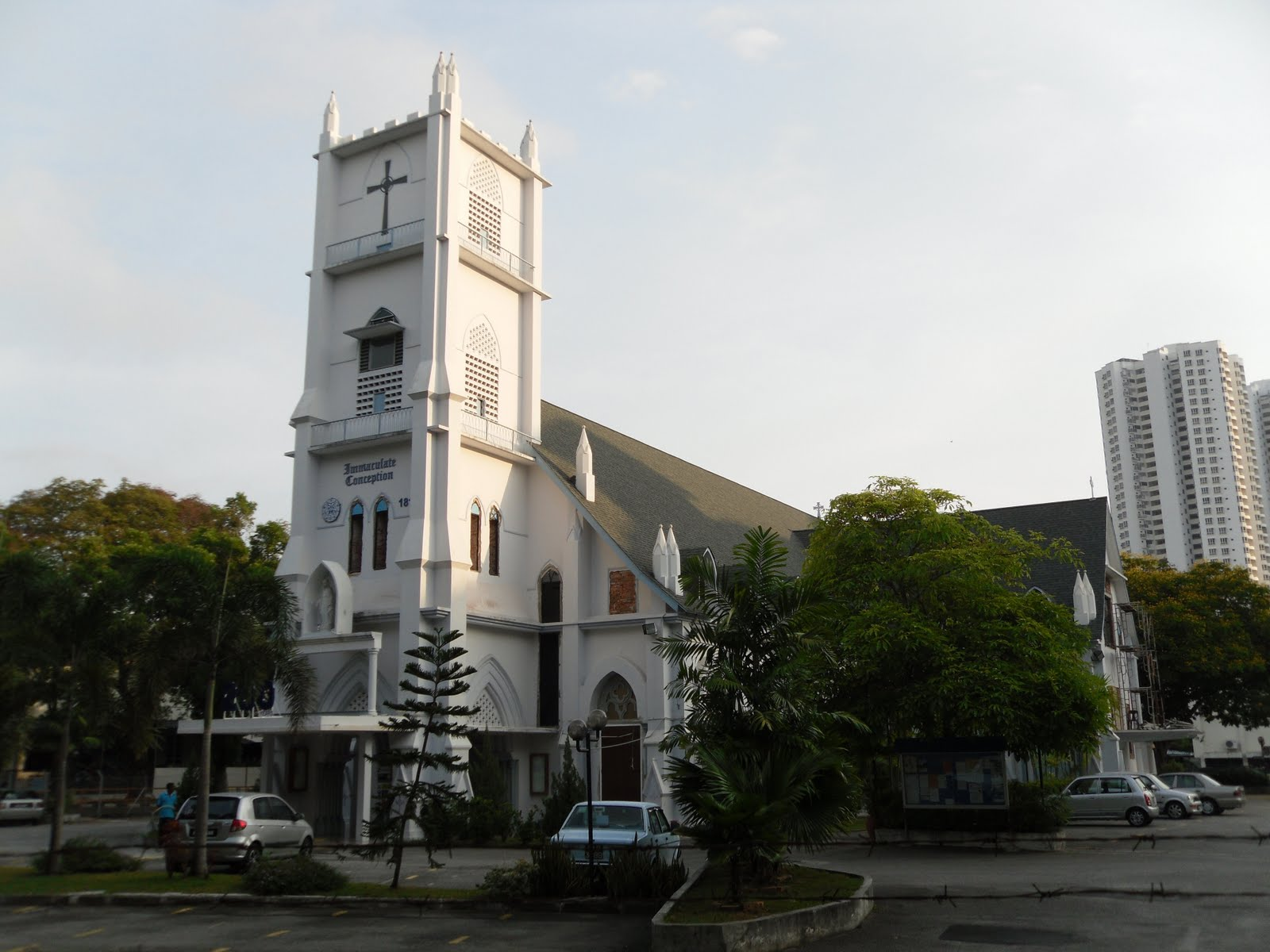
- Church of the Immaculate Conception

- Location within George Town in Penang
- Coordinates: 5°26′1.5426″N 100°18′34.2894″E
- Country: Malaysia
- State: Penang
- City: George Town
- District: Northeast
- Time zone: UTC+8 (MST)
  - Summer (DST): Not observed
- Postal code: 10250

Kampong Serani is a residential neighbourhood within the downtown core of George Town in the Malaysian state of Penang. Located within the city centre, it is bounded by College Avenue to the west and Leandro's Lane to the east.

The neighbourhood is still inhabited by ethnic Eurasians, who had moved into the area as early as the 19th century. However, the enclave has also, in recent years, been under threat from rapid urbanisation and redevelopment.

== Etymology ==
Kampong Serani in Malay is a direct translation of the settlement's English name, Eurasian Village.

== History ==
The second batch of Eurasian settlers, which came after the first batch that had arrived in 1786 with Captain Francis Light, were fleeing religious persecution in Siam, They arrived at Pulau Tikus in 1811 and chose to build their settlement, named Kampong Serani, within the area. As the Eurasians were predominantly Catholic, the settlement was centred around the Church of the Immaculate Conception. Adjacent to the church was College General, a Catholic seminary which had been relocated to the settlement in 1808.

More recently, Kampung Serani residents have been embroiled in a tussle over land rights, as the neighbourhood is earmarked for the construction of a hotel. Although the land was held in trust, it was sold without the trust holders' knowledge to a developer in 2014. When the residents were issued eviction notices, a lawsuit was filed in retaliation against the developer. The lawsuit was dismissed in 2015, leading to fears that the Eurasian enclave will be bulldozed to make way for redevelopment.

== Transportation ==
Kampong Serani is served by Rapid Penang's bus routes 101, 102, 104 and 304, as well as the free-of-charge Pulau Tikus Loop (PTL) and the Congestion Alleviation Transport (CAT) Tanjung Tokong route. These routes link Kampong Serani with various destinations within the city including the Penang International Airport, Queensbay Mall, Batu Ferringhi and Teluk Bahang.

== Education ==
Kampong Serani is home to Convent Pulau Tikus and its primary branch, SRK Convent Pulau Tikus. The all-girls' school was established in 1922, before being relocated to its present-day grounds in 1950.

== See also ==
- Kampung Siam
- Pulau Tikus
- Ayer Rajah
