= Malaysian Siamese =

Malaysians of Thai descent

Malaysian Siamese Orang Siam Malaysia ชาวมาเลเซียเชื้อสายไทย
- (Thailand) (Malaysia)
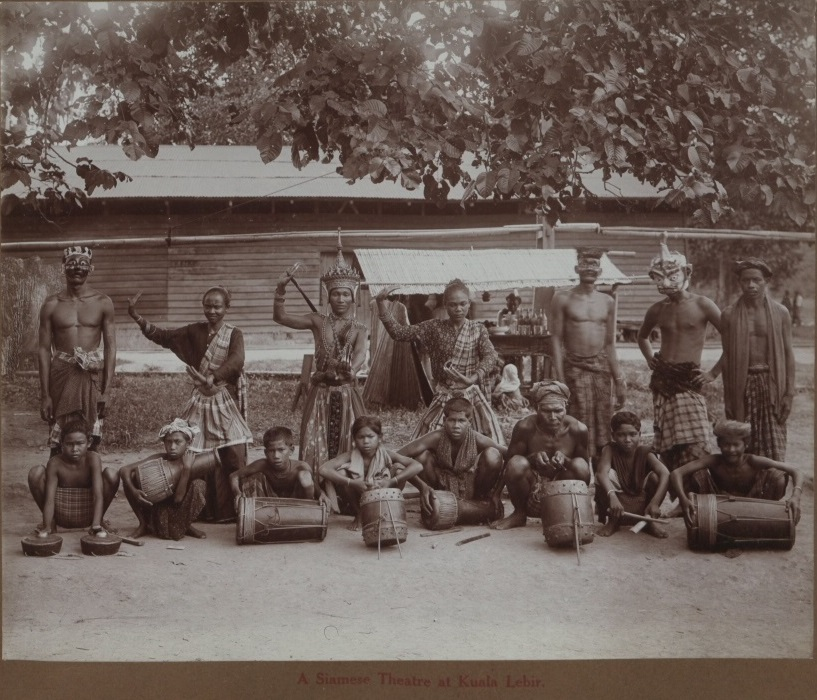
- A group of Siamese theatre performers in Kuala Lebir (present day, Kuala Krai District), Kelantan, July 1909.

Total population
- 63,000

Regions with significant populations
- Kedah, Kelantan, Penang, Perak, Perlis

Languages
- Southern Thai (native); Standard Malay, Kedah Malay, Kelantan-Patani Malay, Standard Thai, Chinese languages, English

Religion
- Predominantly Theravada Buddhism; Minority Sunni Islam

Related ethnic groups
- Other Tai peoples

The Malaysian Siamese (Malay: Orang Siam Malaysia) are an ethnicity or community who principally resides in Peninsular Malaysia which is a relatively homogeneous cultural region to southern Burma and southern Thailand but was separated by the Anglo-Siamese Treaty of 1909 between the United Kingdom and the Kingdom of Siam. The treaty established the modern Malaysia-Thailand Border which starts from Golok River in Kelantan and ends at Padang Besar in Perlis. Before this, there was a mass migration of Siamese from Nakhon Si Thammarat to the northern Malay states seeking refuge following a civil war waged by Taksin of Thonburi against Nakhon ruler Nu in 1769.

== Demographics ==
In 2000, the national statistics cited 50,211 individuals of Siamese ethnicity in Malaysia. Among these, 38,353 (or 76.4% of them) hold Malaysian citizenship.

=== Culture ===
The Malaysian Siamese community share cultural similarities with the natives who inhabit the Malay Peninsula. Community activities, ethnolinguistic identity and languages spoken by Malaysian Siamese are similar to their brethren in the fourteen provinces of Southern Thailand as well as the southernmost Burmese.

The Malaysian Siamese lead a way of life similar to that of other Malaysian Malays. Malaysian Siamese still have the strong belief and practices of Buddhism while the Malaysian Malays have adopted Islam since the 14th century. The Malaysian Siamese are well established in the northernmost states of Malaysia, namely Perlis, Kedah, Penang, Perak and Kelantan. One could not differentiate a Malay or a Siamese if they are not speaking their mother tongue. The only distinctive mark among them is their religion and language. Otherwise Malaysian Siamese are like Malays as they also speak fluent local Malay dialects. The majority of Malaysian Siamese can read and write in Thai because there is Thai language learning and teaching in the schools which were established inside the village temples since 1943. They also often follow news in Thailand, watch Thai dramas and listen to Thai music.

The Malaysian Siamese often get patronage from the state governments for their community's well-being. Often, temples are given generous funding by Thailand's government. Their community are also known for the making of traditional medicine.

=== Religion ===
The Malaysian Siamese predominantly profess Buddhism and the predominant form of Buddhism is Theravāda Buddhism which is centred in their place of worship called Wat. The Malaysian Siamese's lives are closely tied to their temples (Wat). Monks have a significant role in strengthening communities and encouraging villagers to participate in traditional Buddhist ceremonies and rituals on important religious days like (Uposatha Days, Magha Puja, Visakha Puja, Buddhist Lent (Vassa), and End of Buddhist Lent (Kathina)) to preserve the Siamese-Buddhist cultural identity. Most of them settled around temples and consider them as centers for holding religious ceremonies, cultural and social activities.

There also exist a small Thai-speaking Muslim minority called Samsam. The government has put them in the Bumiputera (specifically Malay) category and most have already assimilated into the Malay populace, no longer identifying as Siamese.

== Notable people ==
- Sultan Abdul Halim of Kedah, V & XIVth Yang di-Pertuan Agong of Malaysia (Malay-Siamese lineage)
- Tunku Abdul Rahman, Malaysia's first prime minister (royal Malay-Siamese lineage)
- Bau Wong Bau Ek, Malaysian opposition leader of Kedah
- Samransak Kram, Malaysian national footballer
- Manopsak Kram, Malaysian national footballer
- Hattaphon Bun An, Malaysian footballer
- Jupha Somnet, Malaysian national track cyclist
- Mon Redee Sut Txi, Malaysian national archer
- Saritha Cham Nong, compound archer and part of the Malaysian national team
- Mohd Ridzuan Abdunloh, Malaysian footballer
- Janna Nick, Malaysian actress and singer
- Nelydia Senrose, Malaysian actress (partial Siamese descent)
- Richard Rivalee, Malaysian fashion designer (of Sino-Thai heritage)
- Faezah Elai, Malaysian actress (partial Siamese descent)
- Bront Palarae, Malaysian actor (mixed Malay-Punjabi-Siamese heritage)

== See also ==
- Buddhism in Malaysia
- Chak Phra
- Kampung Siam, Penang
- Wat Buppharam, Penang
- Wat Chayamangkalaram, Penang
- Wat Chetawan, Selangor
- Wat Phothivihan, Kelantan
- Thais in Singapore
- Thai Malays

== Sources ==
- Robert W. Hefner (2001). The Politics of Multiculturalism: Pluralism and Citizenship in Malaysia, Singapore, and Indonesia. University of Hawaii Press. pp. 79–. ISBN 978-0-8248-2487-7.
- Irving Chan Johnson (10 January 2013). The Buddha on Mecca's Verandah: Encounters, Mobilities, and Histories Along the Malaysian-Thai border. University of Washington Press. ISBN 978-0-295-80441-5.
