= Church of the Immaculate Conception, Penang =

Church of the Immaculate Conception
- Malay: Gereja Kandungan Suci; Tamil: அமலோற்பவ அன்னை தேவாலயம்
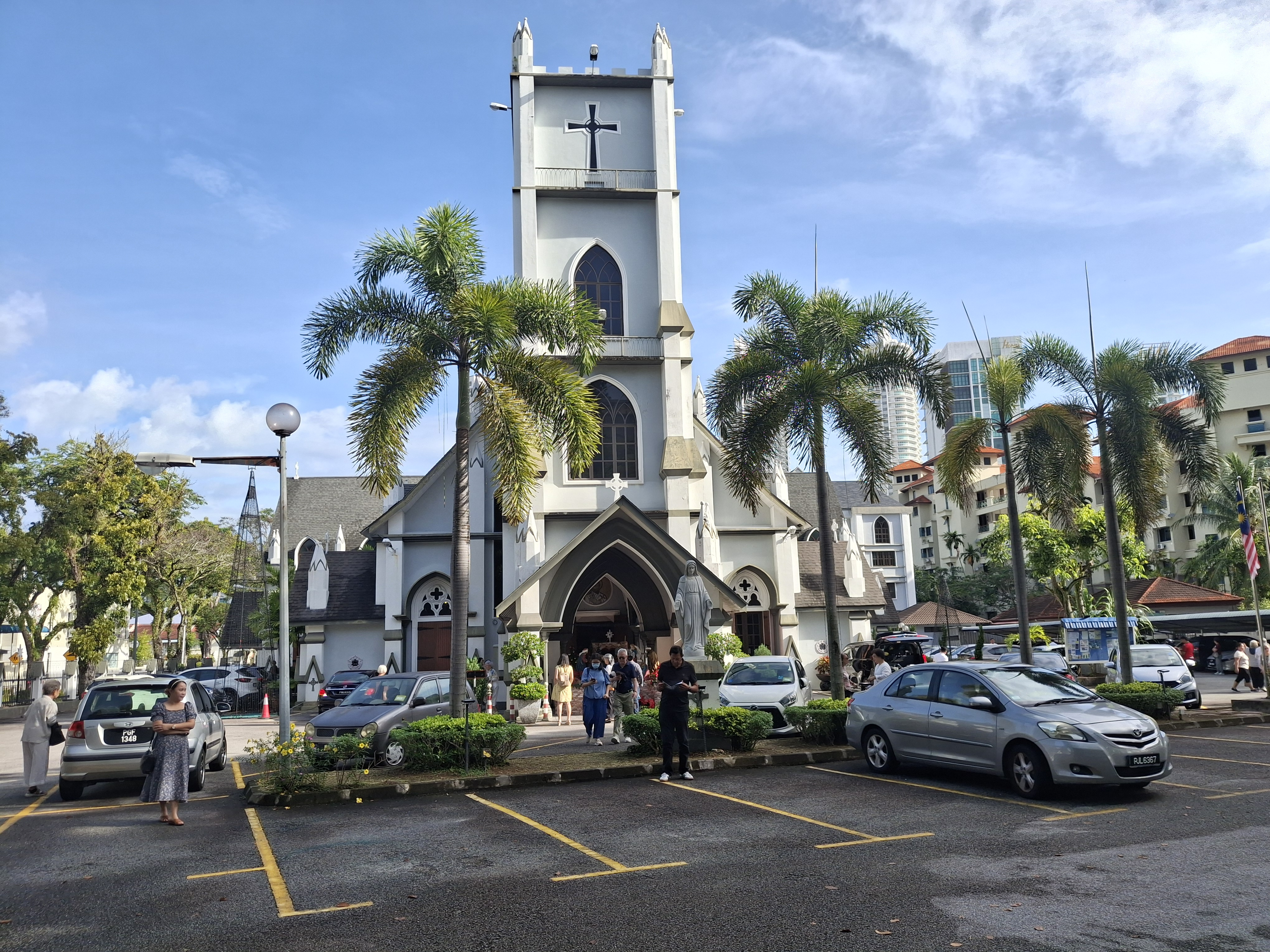

- Location within George Town
- 5°25′59.5734″N 100°18′32.763″E
- Location: Burmah Road, George Town, Penang
- Country: Malaysia
- Denomination: Roman Catholic

Administration
- Diocese: Penang

Clergy
- Priest: Fr. Jude Miranda

The Church of the Immaculate Conception (Malay: Gereja Kandungan Suci, Tamil: அமலோற்பவ அன்னை தேவாலயம்) is a Roman Catholic church within George Town in the Malaysian state of Penang. The church was founded in 1811 and is the second-oldest church in the diocese after Church of the Assumption.

== History ==
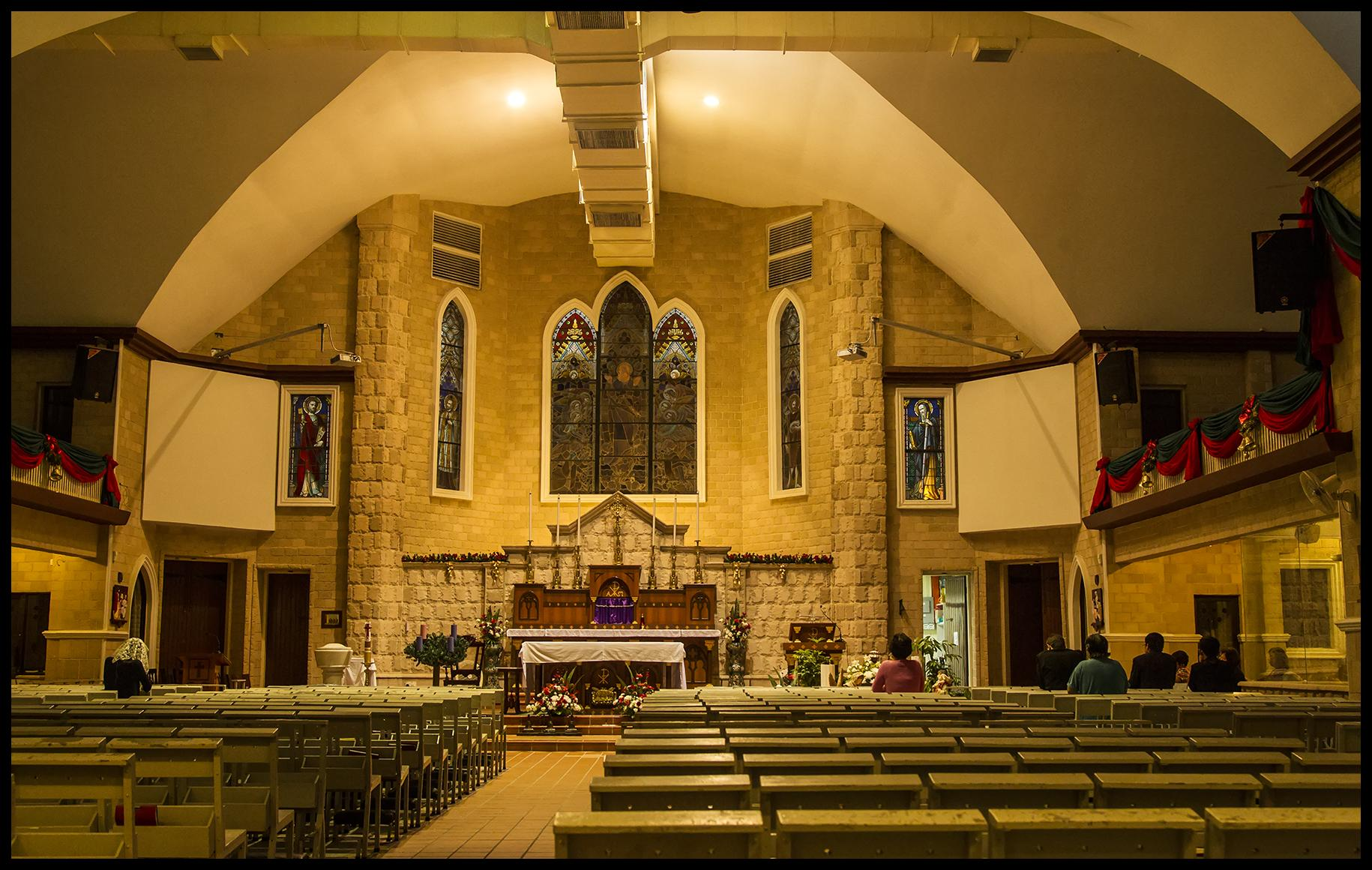
Interior of church

The church was founded in 1811 by Fr. John Baptist Pasqual, from Phuket in Thailand. Fr. Pasqual landed in Pulau Tikus and decided to build a church. Fr. Jacques-Honore Chastan (now a saint), served as the fourth parish priest in the church from 1830 to 1833. He left for Korea to do his missionary work. He was persecuted by the Korean authorities for protecting the Korean Catholics. Pope John Paul II in 1984 canonised him.

The original church building lasted until 1835 when it was replaced with a brick church. On the adjoining a boys' school, St. Xavier's Branch School and Pulau Tikus Convent was constructed nearby. In 1899, due to the collapse of one of the ceilings in the church, it was rebuilt. The church survived until the late 1960s when it was further renovated until the facade today.

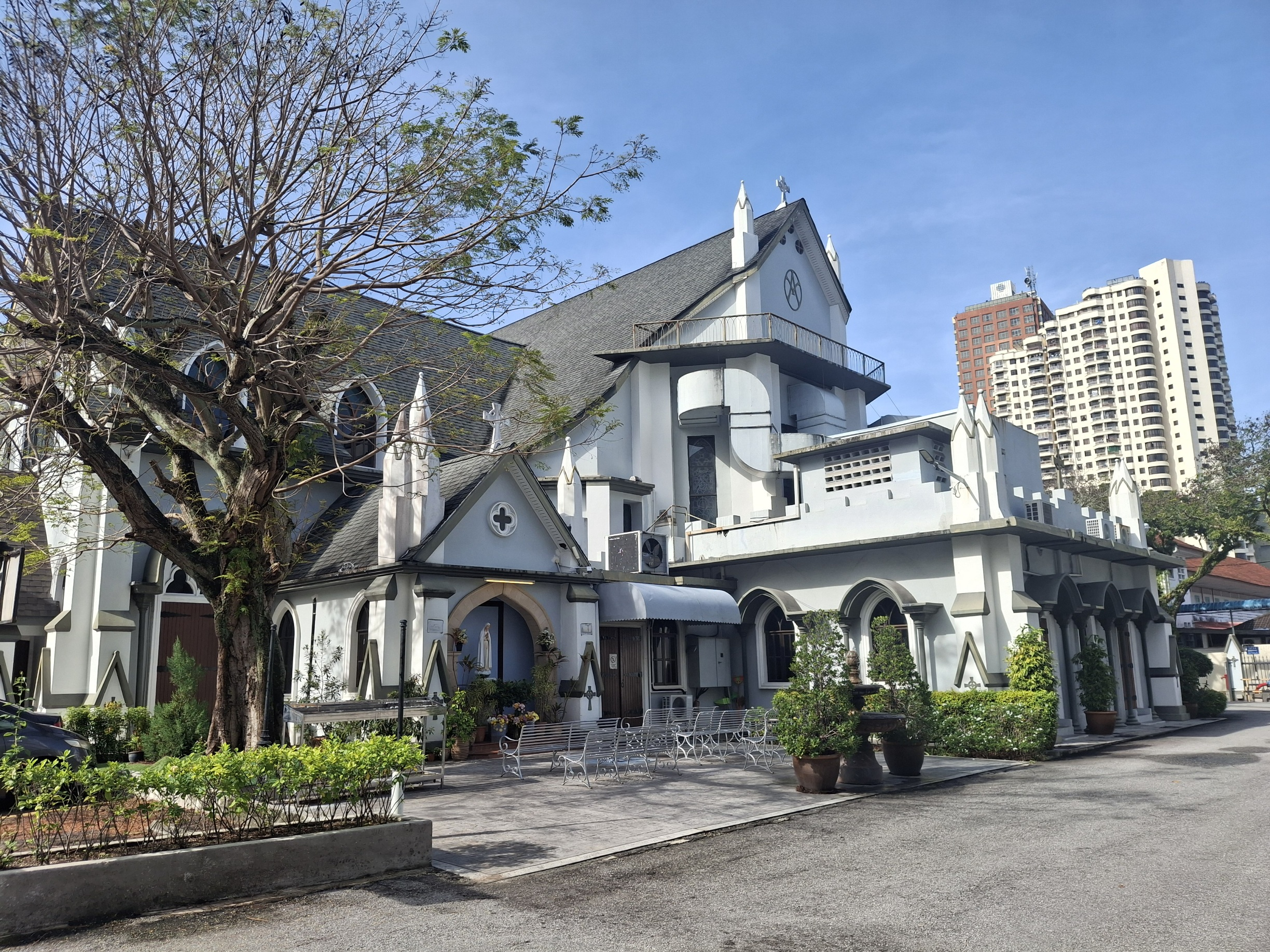
Rear view and Grotto

Currently, the church serves about 5,000 Catholics (traditionally Eurasians, but nowadays also from other ethnicities such as Chinese, Indians as well as internal migrant Sabahans of Kadazan-Dusun, Murut and Rungus descent and also Sarawakians; Dayaks and Orang Ulu, who are working or studying and living in the state of Penang especially in the northern suburbs of Georgetown city and to a lesser extent, expatriates and Overseas Filipino Workers) residing around the north and north-east zone of Penang Island especially in the suburbs or neighbourhoods of Tanjong Pinang, Batu Ferringhi, Tanjung Bungah, Pulau Tikus, Tanjung Tokong, Ayer Rajah, Teluk Bahang and Mount Erskine.

The church is led by Fr. Jude Miranda since October 2018 and it also administers the Chapel of St. Joseph located in Hong Seng Estate, Mount Erskine.

== Mass Times ==
Daily Masses
6:00pm English (Angelus prior to Mass)

Saturday Masses
Novena: 5:30 pm English
Sunset Mass: 6:00 pm English

Sunday Masses
8:30am English
11:30am English (1st Sundays)/Tamil (2nd and 4th Sundays)/Bahasa Malaysia (3rd Sundays)

== See also ==
- Diocese of Penang
- Catholic Church in Malaysia
