= Wat Chayamangkalaram =

Thai Buddhist temple in Penang, Malaysia

- Malay: Wat Chayamangkalaram; Thai: วัดไชยมังคลาราม
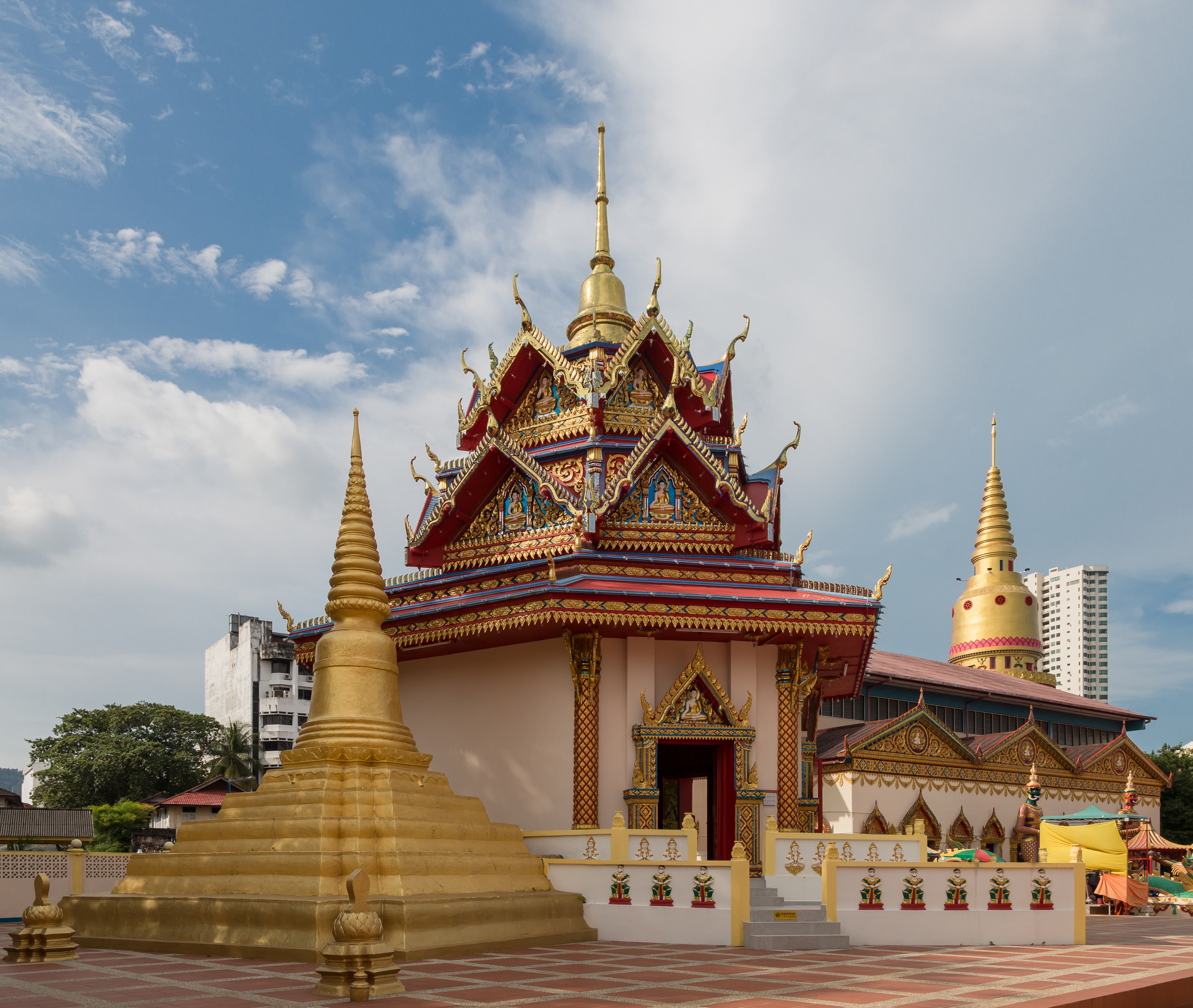

- Location within George Town

Religion
- Affiliation: Buddhism
- Status: Active

Location
- Location: Lorong Burma, Pulau Tikus
- Municipality: George Town
- State: Penang
- Country: Malaysia
- Interactive map of Wat Chayamangkalaram
- Coordinates: 5°25′54.479″N 100°18′48.276″E

Architecture
- Type: Thai temple
- Founder: Phra Phorthan Kuad
- Established: 1845

Wat Chayamangkalaram (Thai: วัดไชยมังคลาราม; RTGS: Wat Chaiyamangkhalaram), also known as the Chayamangkalaram Buddhist Temple, is a Theravada Buddhist temple within George Town in the Malaysian state of Penang. Situated at Lorong Burma opposite the Dhammikarama Burmese Temple, it is the oldest Siamese temple in the state. Wat Chayamangkalaram becomes a focal point for the annual Songkran, Loy Krathong and Vesak Day festivities within the city.

== History ==
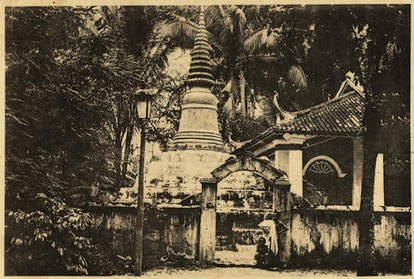
Wat Chayamangkalaram c. 1900

The site for the temple was cleared in 1845 after a piece of land was granted to both Burmese and Siamese community in George Town by Queen Victoria during the Straits Settlements era. In 1830, there were around 648 Burmese and Siamese people in Penang, which then had a population of 40,000. Part of the land awarded to the Siamese was given as a diplomatic gesture to promote trading ties between the British Empire and the Siamese Rattanakosin Kingdom, which was presented by the then-Governor of the Straits Settlements, William John Butterworth to two Siamese female trustees named Nankayo and Boonsoon as the community representatives. Inscriptions also showed that the building of the temple had been largely due to the philanthropic efforts of local Chinese Buddhists.

In 1845, the temple was founded in the given land by Phra Phorthan Kuad, a powerful monk which according to the local legend was also very fond of asam laksa. Subsequently, making the dish become a normal offering by devotees when visiting his shrine in the temple. In 1948, the temple was officially named "Wat Chayamangkalaram". Since its establishment, the temple has undergone several renovations, with the addition of other structures. A reclining Buddha statue named Phra Chaiya Mongkol was constructed in the temple in 1958 with a total cost of M$100,000 (Malayan dollars). In 1962, the temple was visited by the King of Thailand, Bhumibol Adulyadej and Queen Sirikit as part of their state visit to Malaya.

== Features ==
The temple features one of the world's longest reclining Buddha statues as well as several coloured statues of Yakshas and other mythical creatures. Measuring from 32 m (105 ft) to 33 m (108 ft) from end to end, the statue also serves as a columbarium, in which the urns of the cremated are housed. Several smaller statues of the Buddha in various poses and of the Devas can be seen throughout the temple, particularly adorning the main prayer hall.

== Gallery ==
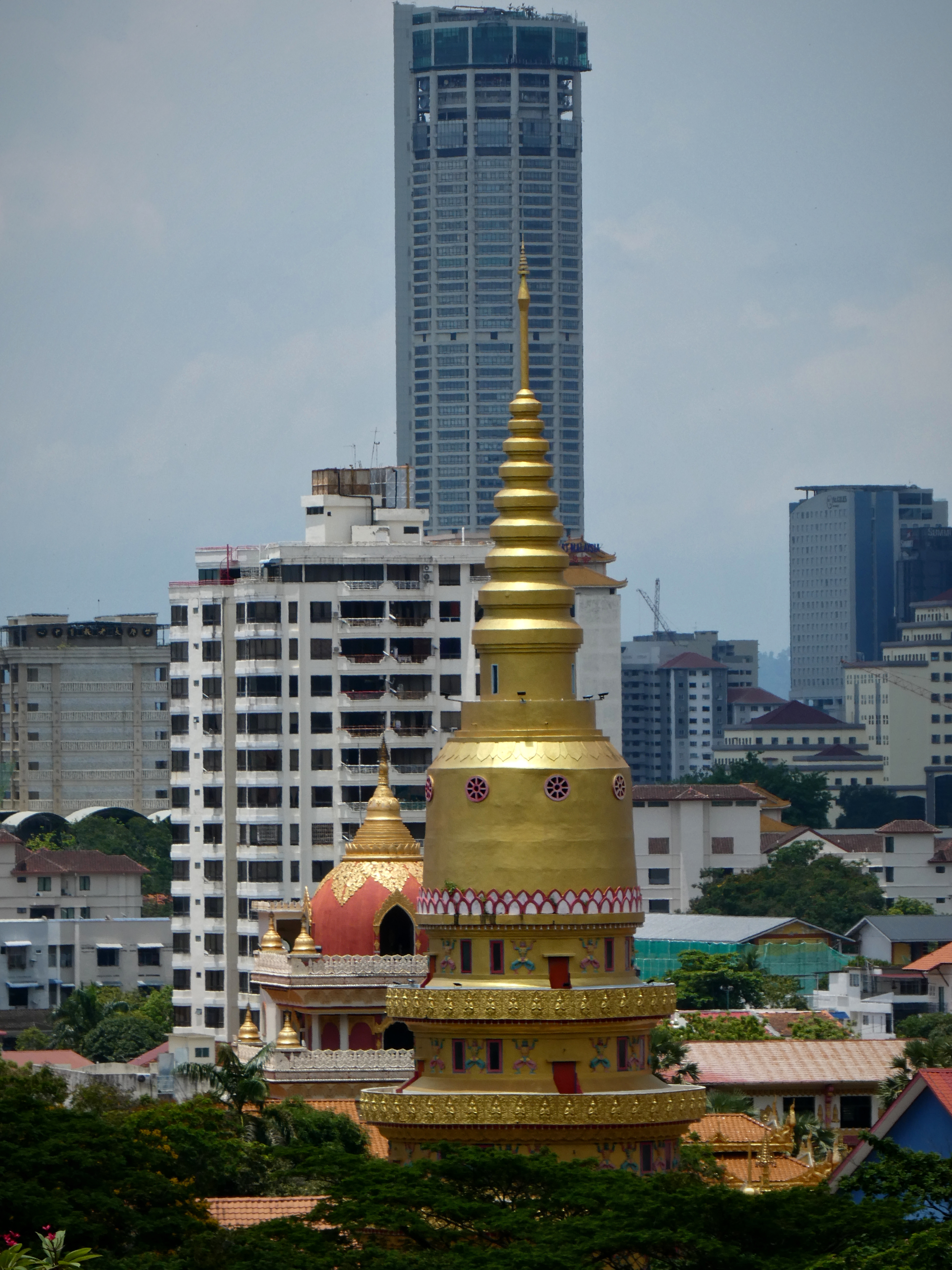
The temple's stupa, with Komtar in the background.

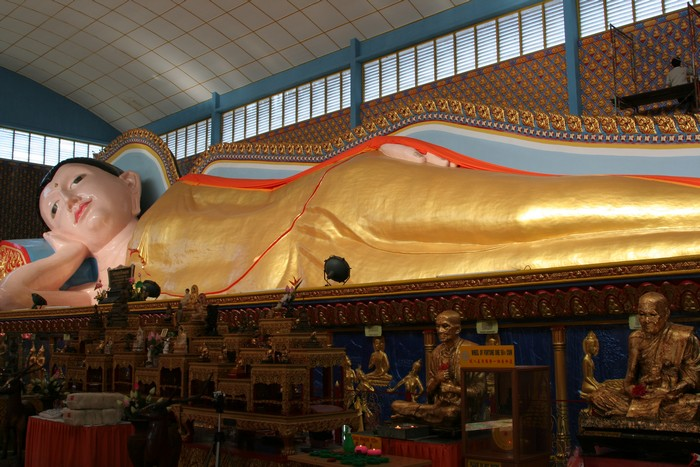
Reclining Buddha statue inside the temple which is considered one of the world's longest.

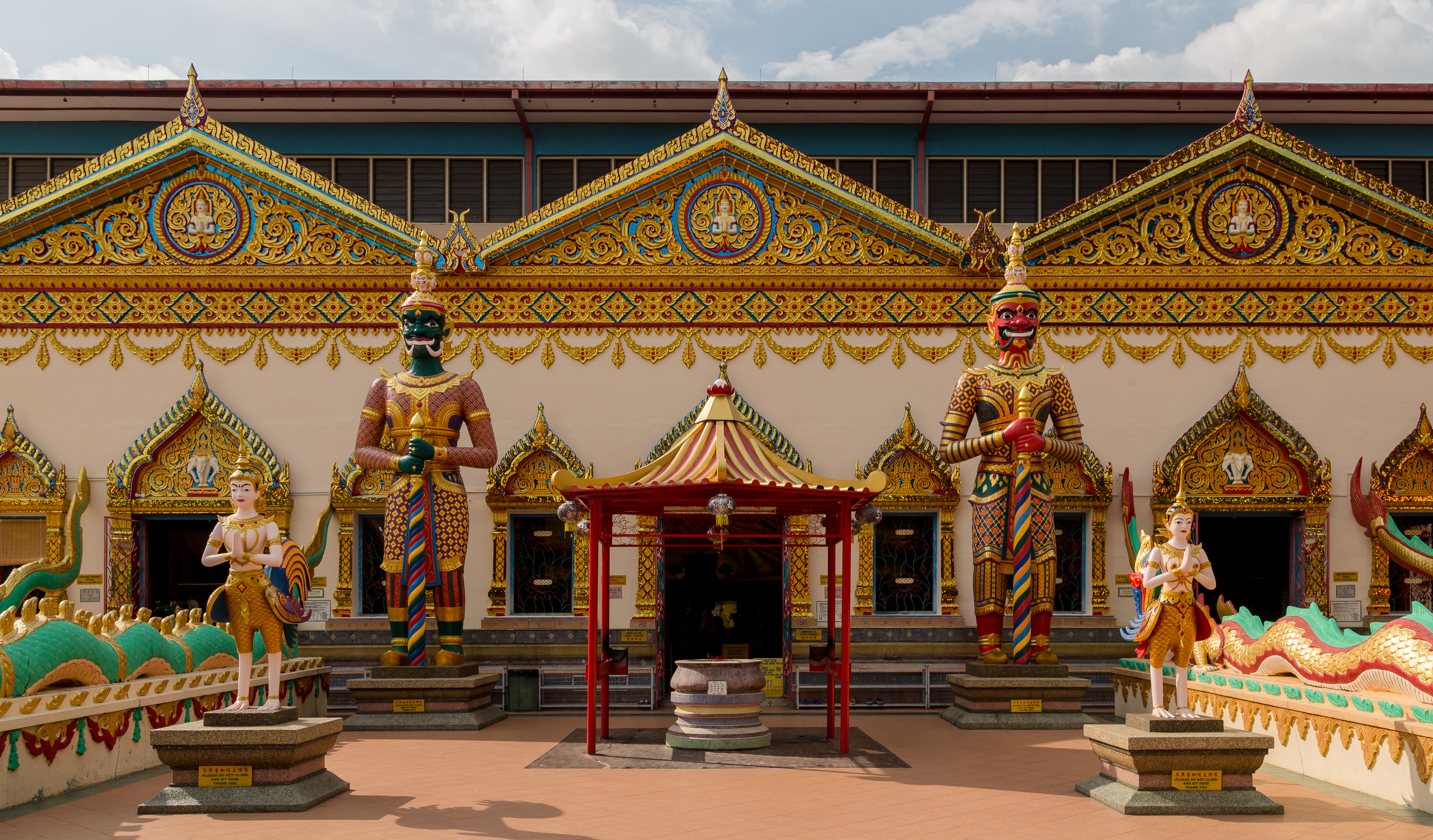
Statue of Devas and Yakshas guarding the temple.

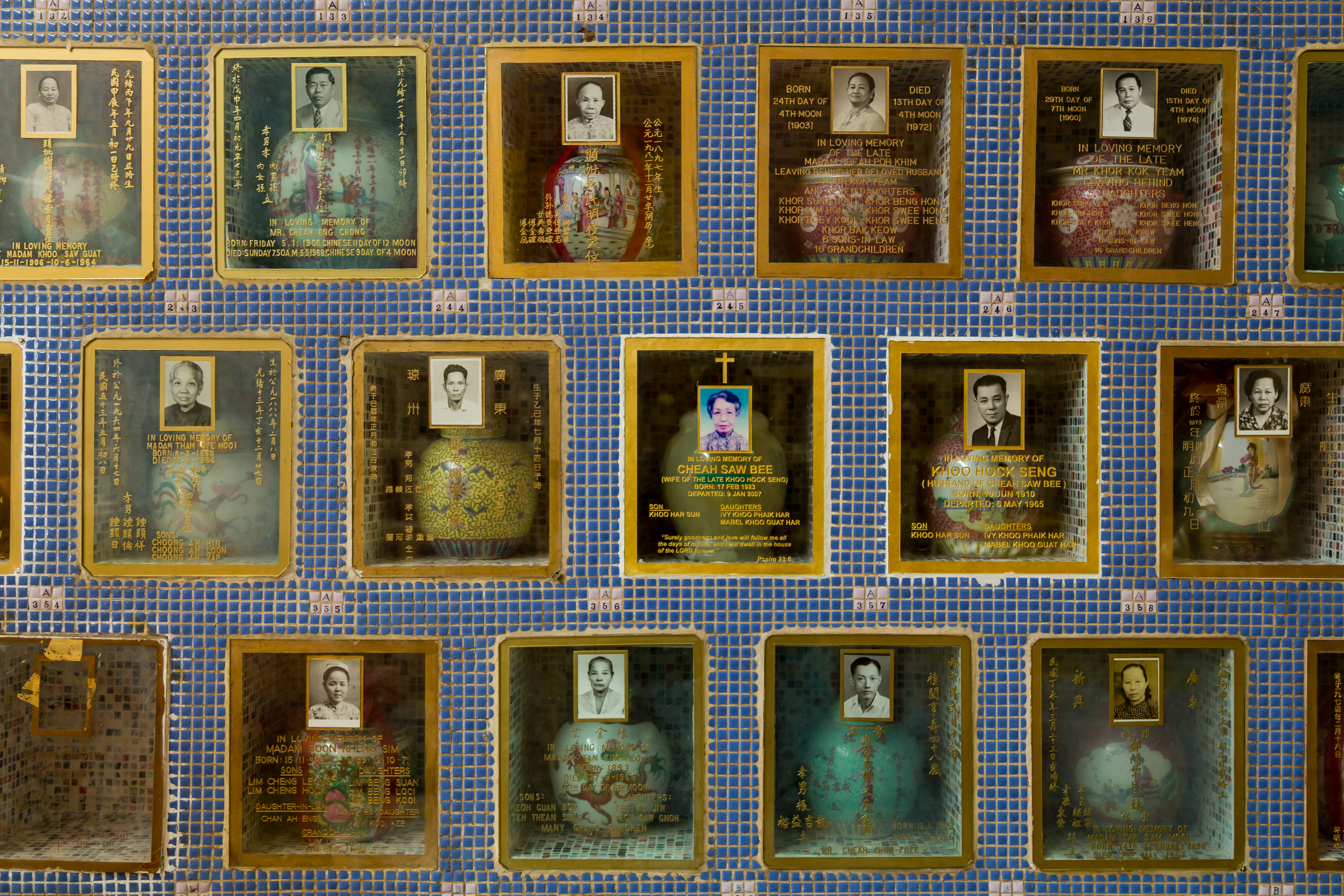
Urns where the cremated are being housed.
