= Dhammikarama Burmese Temple =

Burmese Buddhist temple in Penang, Malaysia

- Malay: Kuil Burma Dhammikarama; Burmese: ဓမ္မိကာရာမမြန်မာကျောင်း
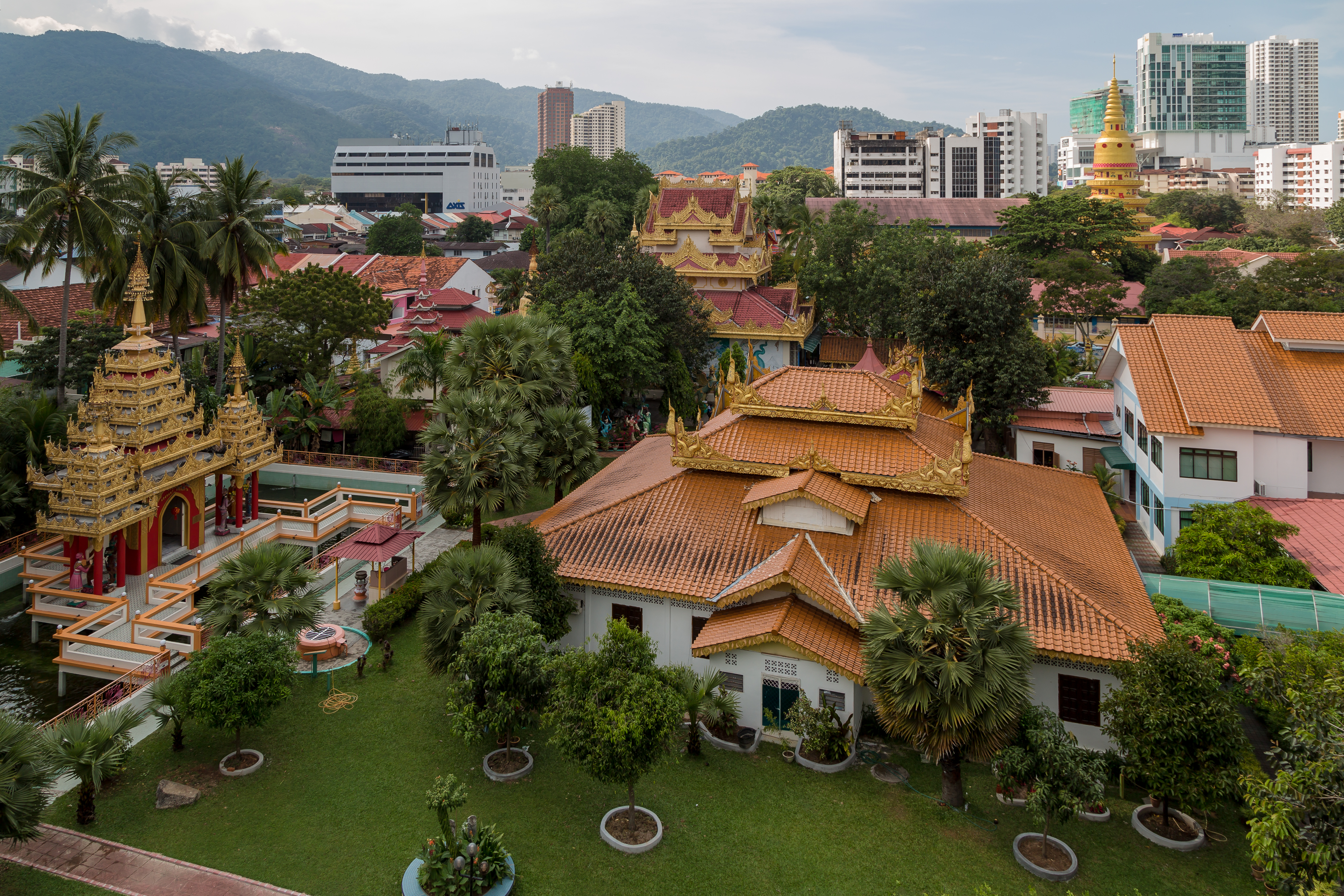

- Location within George Town

Religion
- Affiliation: Buddhism
- Status: Active

Location
- Location: Lorong Burma, Pulau Tikus
- Municipality: George Town
- State: Penang
- Country: Malaysia
- Interactive map of Dhammikarama Burmese Temple
- Coordinates: 5°25′51.345″N 100°18′51.347″E

Architecture
- Type: Burmese temple
- Founder: U. Nandamala
- Established: 1803

Dhammikarama Burmese Temple (Burmese: ဓမ္မိကာရာမမြန်မာကျောင်း) is a Theravada Buddhist temple within George Town in the Malaysian state of Penang. Situated at Lorong Burma opposite Wat Chayamangkalaram, it is the only Burmese temple in the state, and a focal point for the annual Water, Thingyan and Mid-Autumn festivals in the city, as well as the Buddhist Lent.

== History ==
Since the early 19th century, there had been a Burmese settlement in Pulau Tikus. On 1 August 1803, a small temple named "Nandy Moloh Temple" was erected in the area by the Burmese community from a land donated by Nyonya Betong after she purchased a land for $390 (Spanish dollar) from George Layton. The first abbot for the temple was U. Nandamala. Since its early times, women devotees have been the mainstay of the temple with four female trustees; Nyonya Betong, Nyonya Meerut, Nyonya Koloh and Nyonya Bulan. As the Burmese community grows, they later appealed to Queen Victoria for additional lands to extend the temple size as well for the burial grounds of the elders. This was received positively by the government of the Straits Settlements and a grant was made to two Burmese female trustees named Nongmay and Boonkhan during the term of W. J. Butterworth as the Straits Settlements governor in 1845.

== Features ==
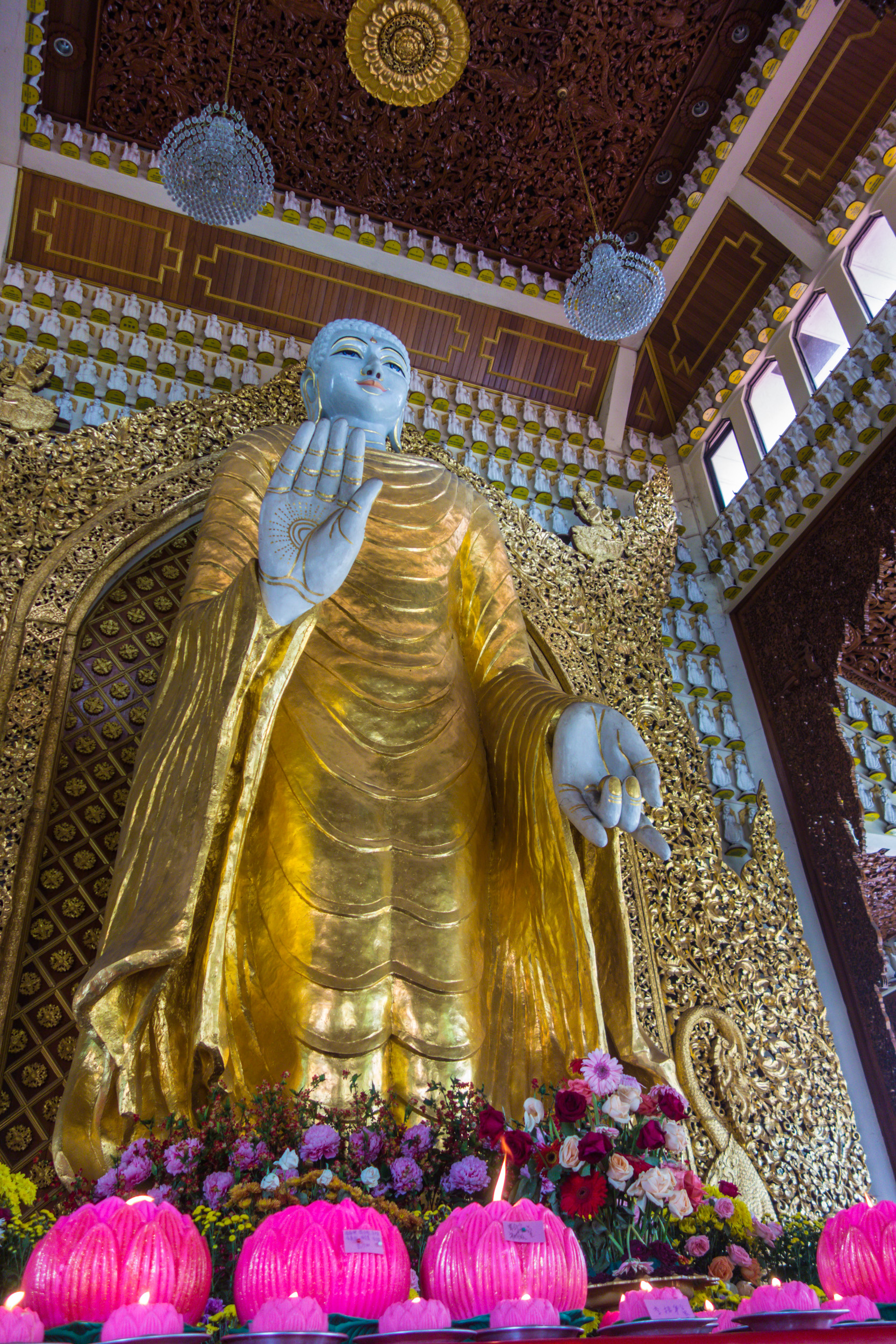
Statue of standing Buddha in the main shrine hall.

Established as a kyaung (monastery), the temple serves as a retreat for Buddhist devotee, with a monks' quarters, a preceptees' lodge and a library within the temple grounds. Numerous statues of the Buddha and mythical creatures such as elephants, fishes and the garuda to symbolise the "three realms of land, air and sea" are scattered within the temple, including a pair of winged chimeras known as Panca Rupa (the Guardian Protectors of the World) and a huge mural depicting the Renunciation of the Buddha. As with other Burmese temples, the chinthe is another prominent creature within the temple with the temple compound also featuring a gardening landscape.

The oldest portion of the temple is its stupa, which was consecrated in 1805. The stupa was then enshrined within an outer stupa that was built in 1838, along with the temple's ordination hall - Sasana Vamsa Sima Shrine Hall - which is guarded by a pair of stone elephants. The shrine hall was last renovated in 1995 to cope with the increase in the number of devotees. The standing Buddha in the shrine hall has a gold-gilded backdrop of carvings with the hall ceiling also exhibits fine carvings which are lacquered brown. In addition, a well was also dug for use by the surrounding Burmese community but since the advent of piped water, the well has since been left unused.

The temple's Arahant Upagutta Shrine was originally constructed in a wooden structure in 1840 before a new shrine is built in 1976. Upagutta is said to possess the power to ward off evil spirits, obstacles and dangers. The shrine is accompanied by two other statues; one of them are Arahant Khema. Subsequently, a new structure called as the "Golden Pagoda Bell Tower" were added to the temple where it is completed in 2011 with a cost of RM3 million. As with the rest of the temple, its pagoda is steeped in Burmese architectural styles, with artisans brought in from Myanmar specifically for the construction of the structure.

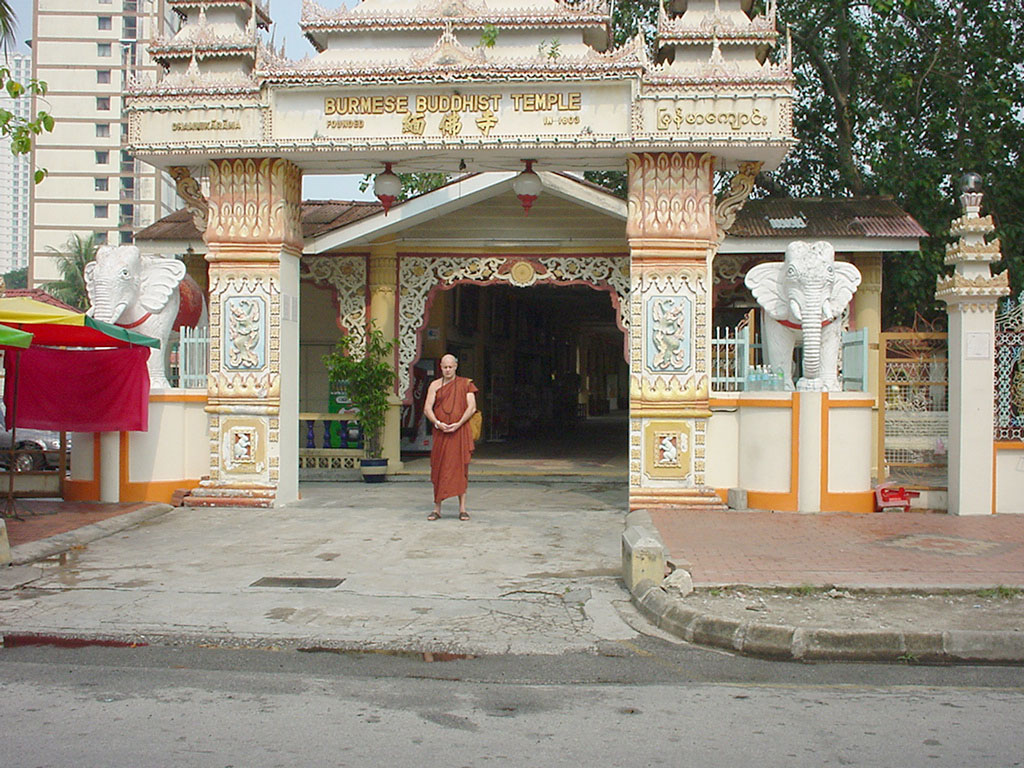
A monk standing in front of the temple gate.

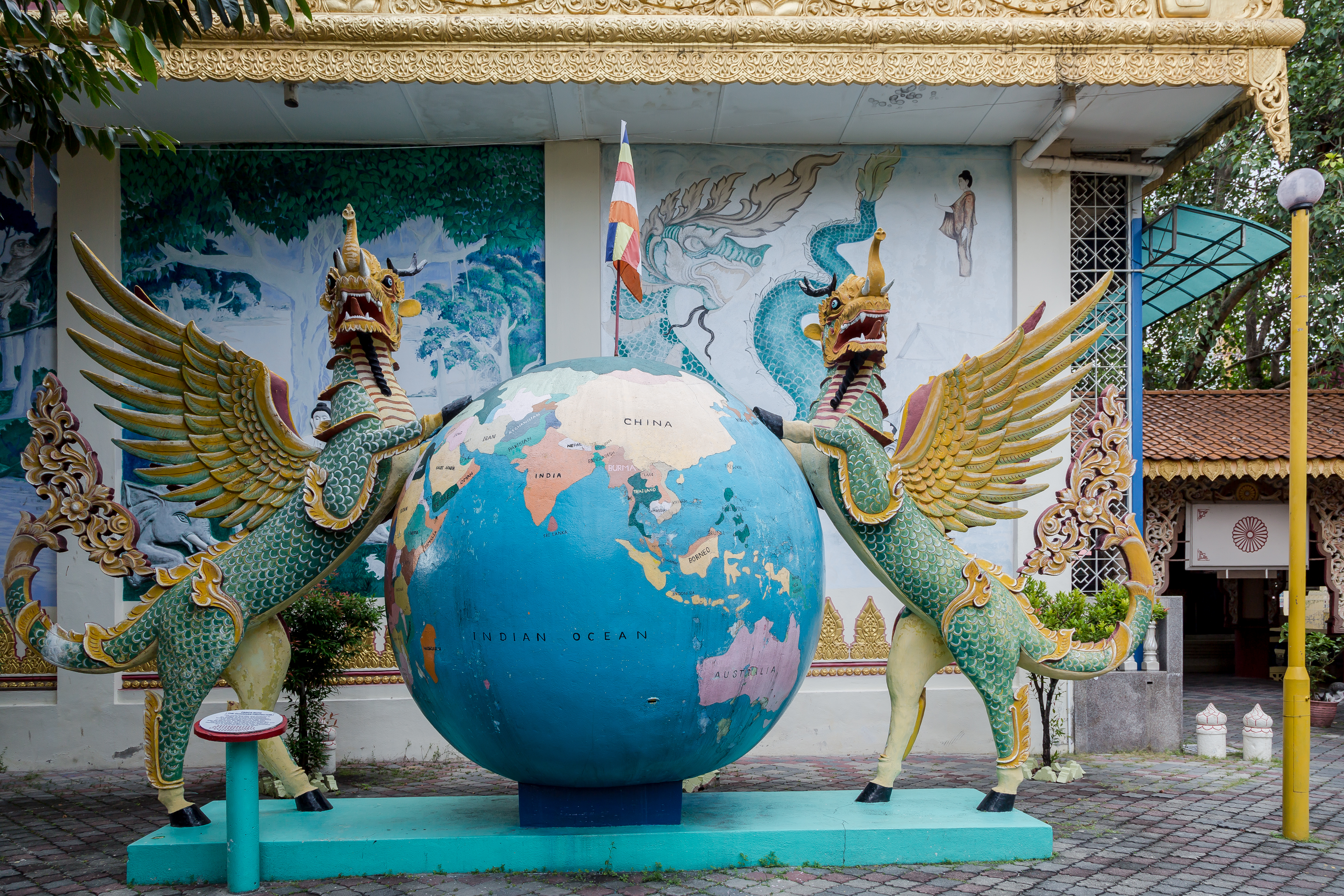
The Panca Rupa winged chimeras (the Guardian Protectors of the World).

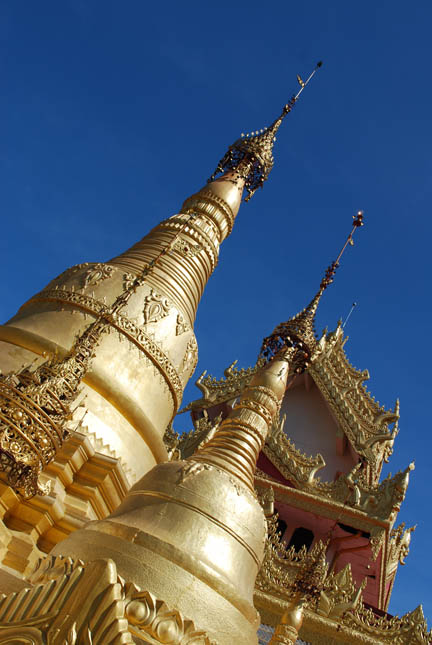
The temple stupas as seen in 2008.

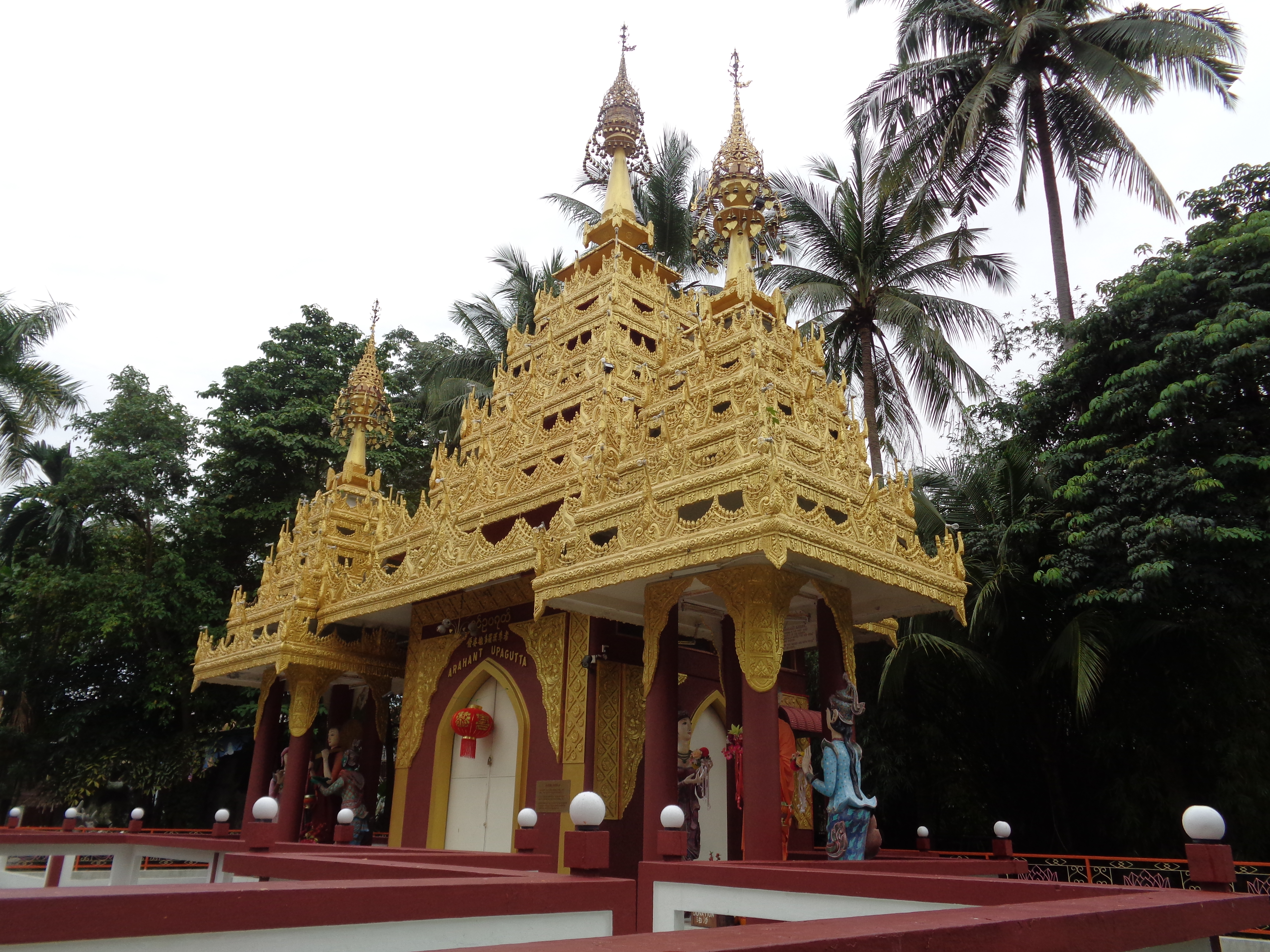
Arahant Upagutta

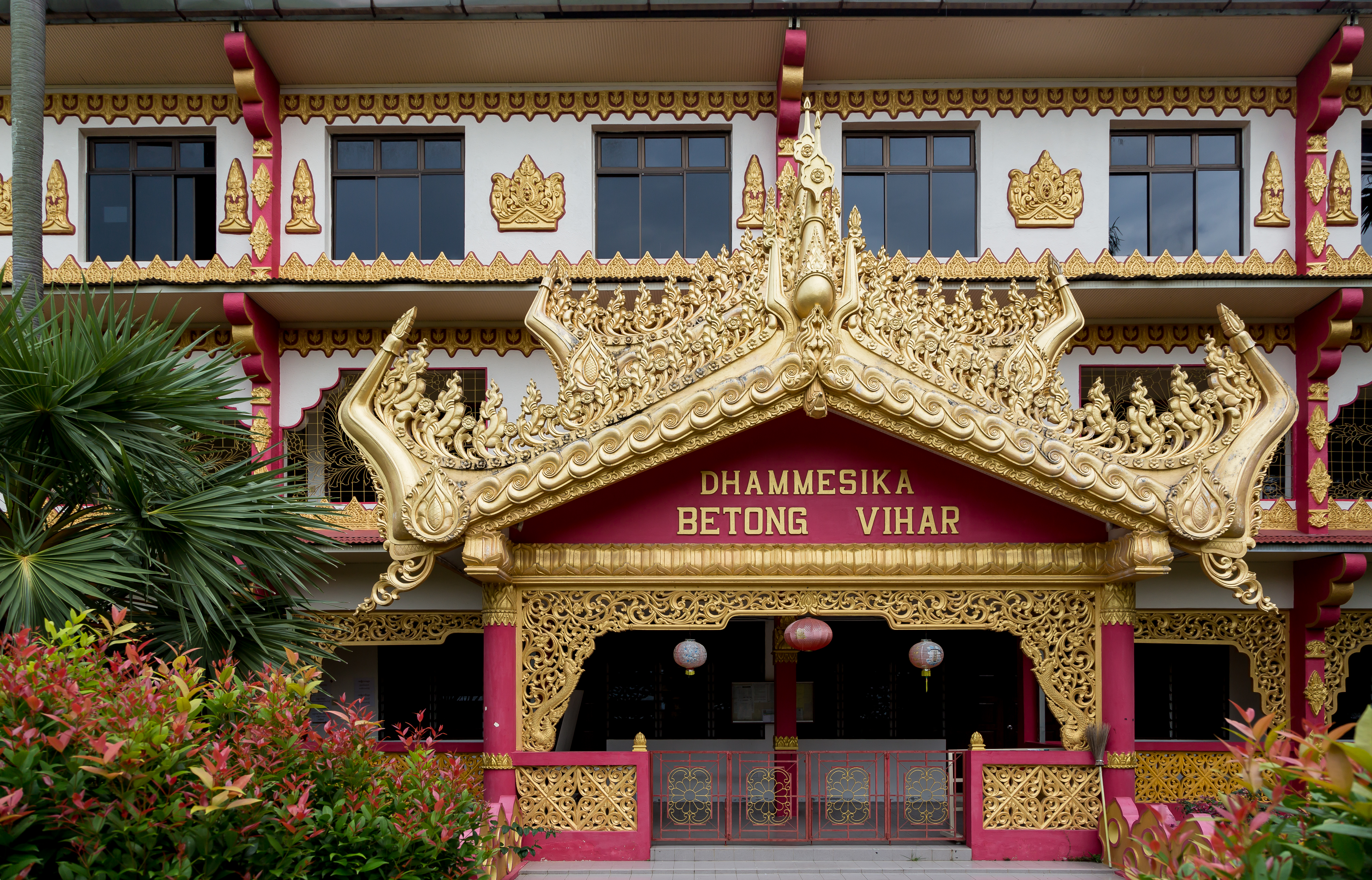
Roofing arts with Burmese architecture.

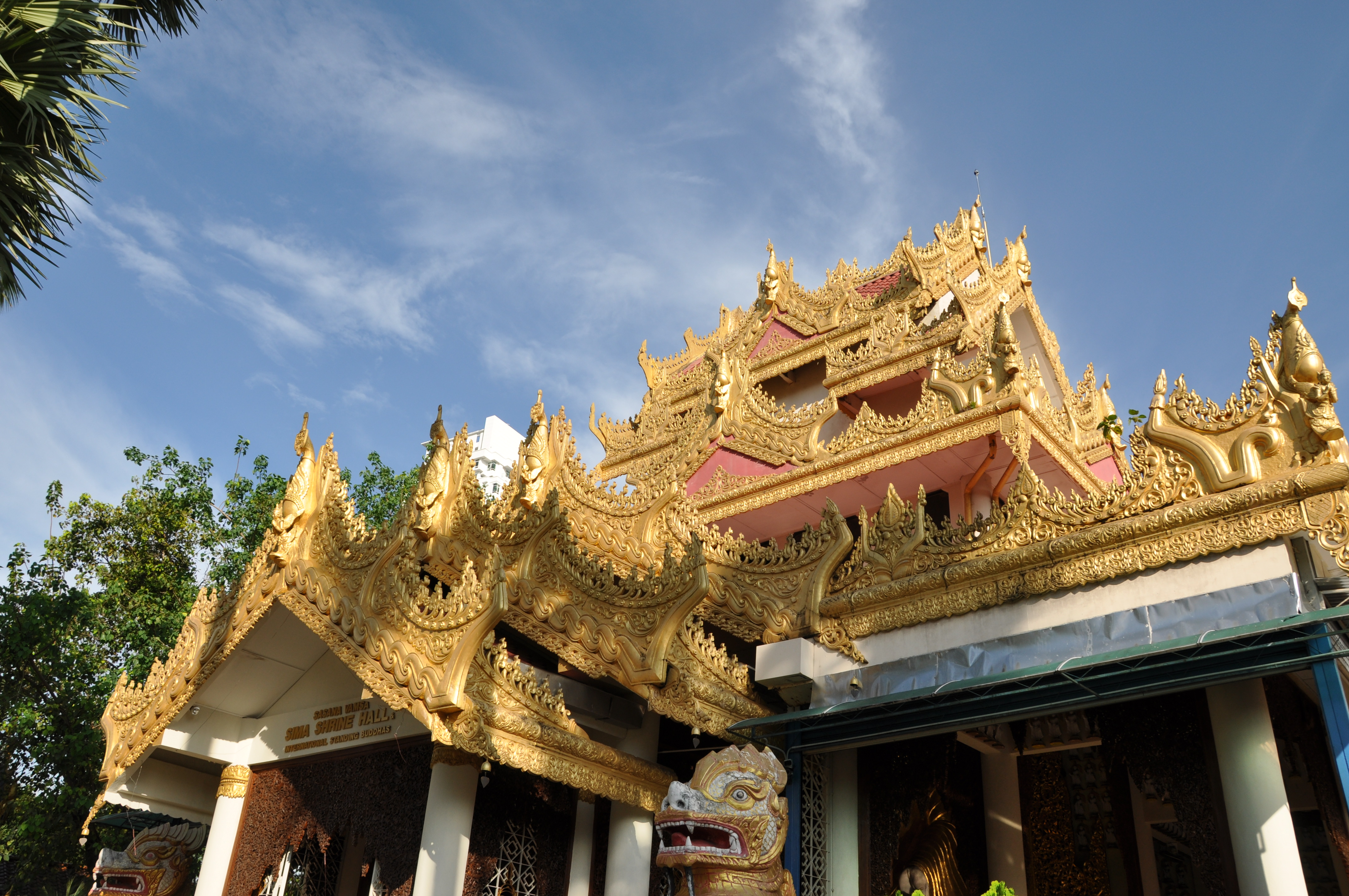
The Sima Shrine Hall.

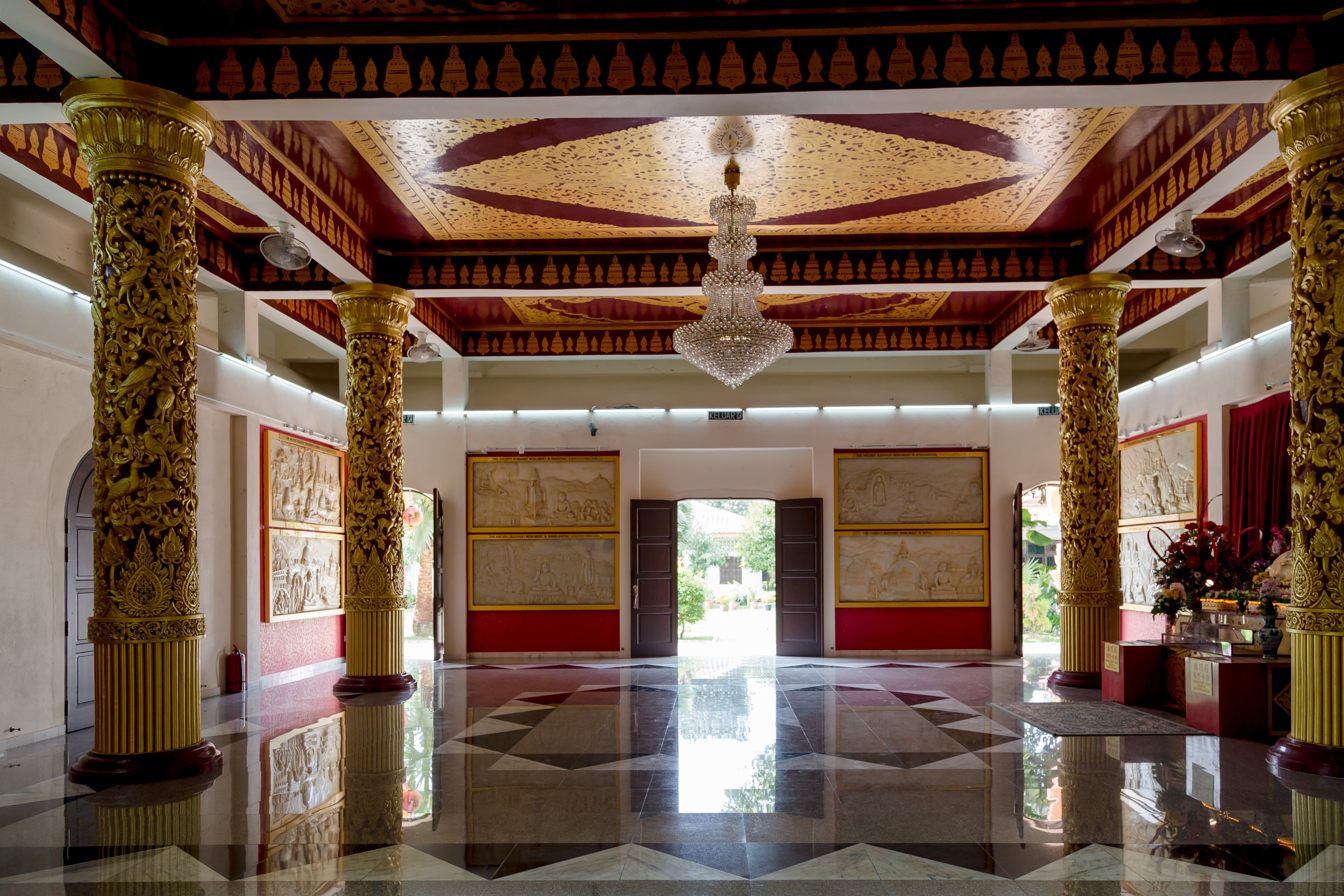
Inside one of the temple hall.
