= Richard Rivalee =

Malaysian fashion designer

- Born: 1966, Age 58; Penang, Malaysia
- Label: Richard Rivalee Couture House
- Awards: Penang Young Designer High Fashion Award 1993/94, MODA Theater Clothes of High Fashion 1997/98 Award

Richard Rivalee, is a Malaysian fashion designer based in Penang, Malaysia.

== Early life ==
He was born in 1966 from mixed Thai and Chinese parentage. He was brought up by his father in Penang, Malaysia after his parents’ divorce and due to family financial condition, he dropped out of school at very young age. He started his career as a hair stylist with a strong passion in fashion design. After years of savings, he enrolled for fashion design classes and apprenticed with Mdm.P’ng Guay Keow of Galeen Fashion Institute.

== Fashion Style ==
Richard is best known for his design in High Fashion under the label of Richard Rivalee Couture House. Recent notable collections include an evening gown series which featured in his "Richard Rivalee's Black Collection 2011". His womenswear collections cover western style and Malay style evening gowns and bridal gowns. His menswear collections cover modern classic clothing, suits and tuxedos.

== Fashion business ==
Richard's designs and collections have reached internationally with clienteles from Asia, Europe and United States of America. His collections are often featured in fashion and life style magazines in Malaysia and international such as Essenze (Malaysia), Backstage Professional (Malaysia), Fiori (Indonesia), AXM (UK) and many more. His collections are featured in fashion weeks, charity fashion events, ballroom galas and international beauty pageants. Among the projects, he has worked with celebrities such as Petrina Fung Bo Bo, Amber Chia, Ning Baizura and Soong Ai Ling. His collections also featured in international renowned brands events such as Poh Kong Jeweller, Cartier, Swarovski and Jaeger-LeCoultre.

== Business acquisition ==
In early 2012, the label was acquired by a group of private investors for an undisclosed amount. Richard Rivalee is named the Chief Designer of the Company. On 19 May 2012, the Label celebrated its 22nd Anniversary in conjunction with the launch of its new label design. The event was held at the main premise located at the UNESCO World Heritage Site - Georgetown, Penang, Malaysia. According to its internal source, the company direction is to rebrand the label to international level while maintaining its uniqueness. In May 2012, Richard Rivalee was featured on Hong Kong TVBE channel via the introduction by Petrina Fung Bo Bo as her personal fashion designer.

== Major events and sponsorships ==
Richard also make appearance as guest judge on various model contests, talent shows and beauty pageants.

Major Events/Sponsorships by Richard Rivalee Couture House:

- Miss Malaysia Universe Grand Final - 2002
- Kuala Lumpur Fashion Week & Simply Haute Fashion Gala Dinner - 2004
- Richard Rivalee Fashion Collection - 2005
- Cartier Jewelry Fashion Show - 2006
- Swarovski Creature Design Fashion Show - 2007
- Ning Baizura Batique Evening - 2008
- Jaeger-LeCoultre Watches Show, Mystical Adventure - 2009
- Poh Kong Jewelry Collections Fashion Show - 2012
- In-Penang Award Presentation - 2012
- Miss Auto City Beauty Pageant - 2012
- Hong Kong aTV 55th Anniversary Show at Beijing - 2012
