= Burmese in Malaysia =

Total population
- 303,996 (2014)

Regions with significant populations
- Kuala Lumpur · Selangor · Penang · Johore · Kedah

Languages
- Burmese · Kuki-Chin-Zo · Rohingya · Malay · English and other Burmese languages

Religion
- Christianity · Islam · Buddhism

Related ethnic groups
- Burmese diaspora, Malaysian Siamese

Burmese in Malaysia mostly comprise manual labourers and refugees. The 2014 Myanmar Census enumerated 303,996 Burmese individuals living in Malaysia. As of November 2014, there are around 139,200 Burmese refugees registered under UNHCR for which 50,620 are Chins, 40,070 are Rohingyas, 12,160 Panthays and 7,440 others are Rakhines. However, the Malaysian government does not officially recognise all newly arrived refugees as it may encourage more to enter Malaysia as Malaysian officials noted they may become a threat to national security. Many of the new workers and refugees have frequently fallen into the hands of human traffickers and have been killed by other criminals.

== Notable people ==
- Nora Danish – Malaysian actress, model and television host.
- Tiara Jacquelina – Malaysian actress and film producer.

== See also ==
- Burma–Malaysia relations
