= Wat Buppharam, Penang =

Thai Buddhist temple in Penang, Malaysia

Wat Buppharam
- Malay: Wat Buppharam; Thai: วัดบุปผาราม
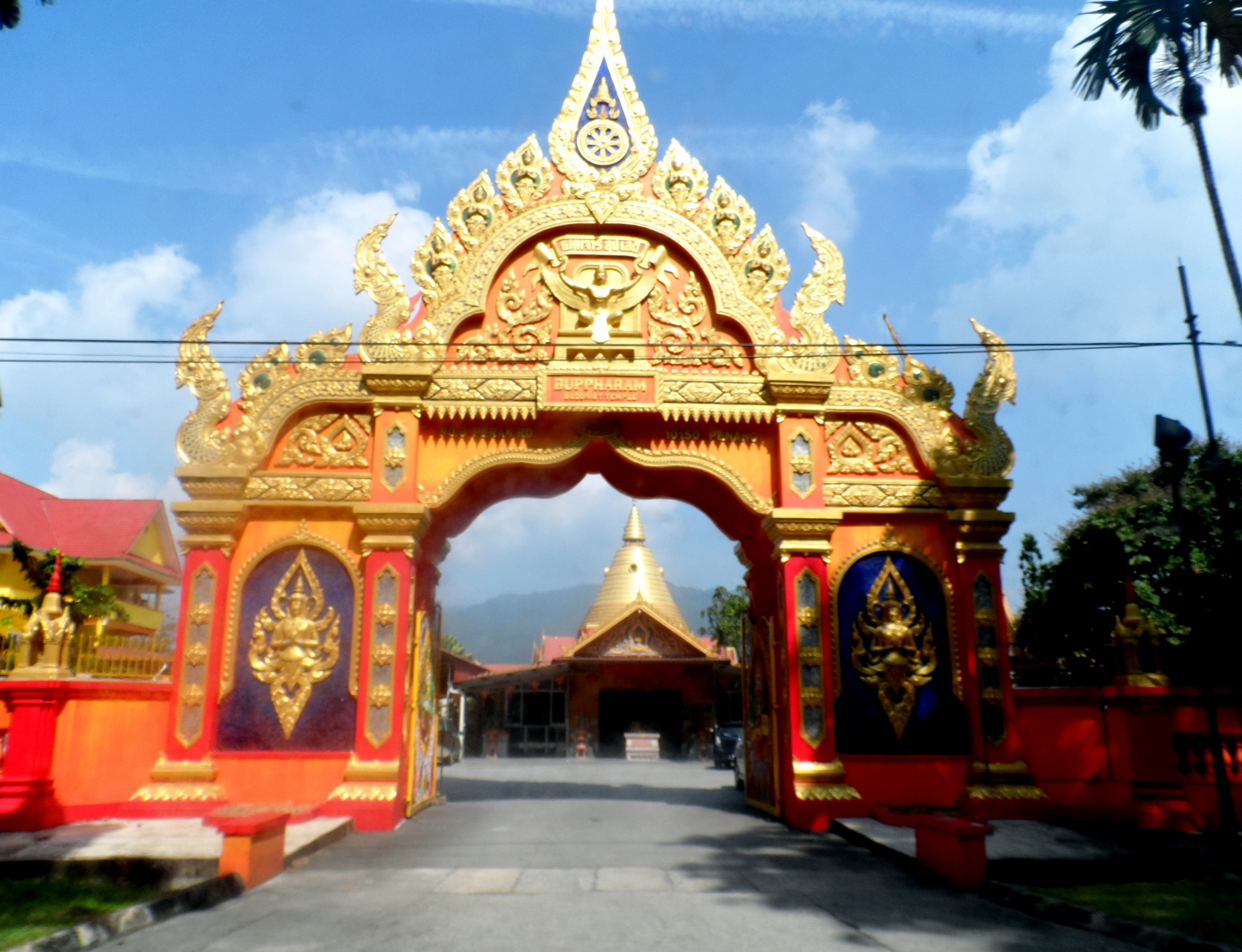

- Location within George Town

Religion
- Affiliation: Buddhism
- Status: Active

Location
- Location: Jalan Perak, Pulau Tikus
- Municipality: George Town
- State: Penang
- Country: Malaysia
- Coordinates: 5°25′32.562″N 100°18′58.376″E

Architecture
- Type: Thai temple
- Founder: Phra Phothan Srikheaw
- Established: 1942

Wat Buppharam (Thai: วัดบุปผาราม; RTGS: Wat Buppharam), also known as the Buppharam Buddhist Temple, is a Theravada Buddhist temple within George Town in the Malaysian state of Penang. Situated at Jalan Perak, the temple is the home to a renowned statue of Buddha, the "Lifting Buddha". It becomes a focal point for the annual Songkran, Loy Krathong and Vesak Day festivities within the city, as well as the Jathukarm-Ramathep-Ganesha blessing ceremonies.

== History ==
The temple was built during the Japanese occupation of British Malaya in 1942 by Phra Phothan Srikheaw, a Thai monk who became the temple's first abbot.

== Features ==
The temple is renowned for a century-old Buddha statue nicknamed the "Lifting Buddha". Urban legend has it that the statue contains the ability to predict whether a devotee's wishes can be fulfilled. If the statue can be lifted the first time the devotee concentrates on his or her wishes, and subsequently becomes too heavy to lift the second time, then the devotee's wish is indeed attainable. Although founded as a Theravāda Buddhist temple with the layout of Thai tradition, the temple are decorated with various mythical religious creatures of Nāgas with the mixture of Hindu and Taoist deities such as the statue of Ganesha which is placed at the main entrance while in the left located a shrine specifically for Guan Yin. On the far side leading to the burial grounds, there is a small shrine to Tudigong (Goddess of Land). In spite of the temple complex modest size, it has arguably one of the largest arches in the state.

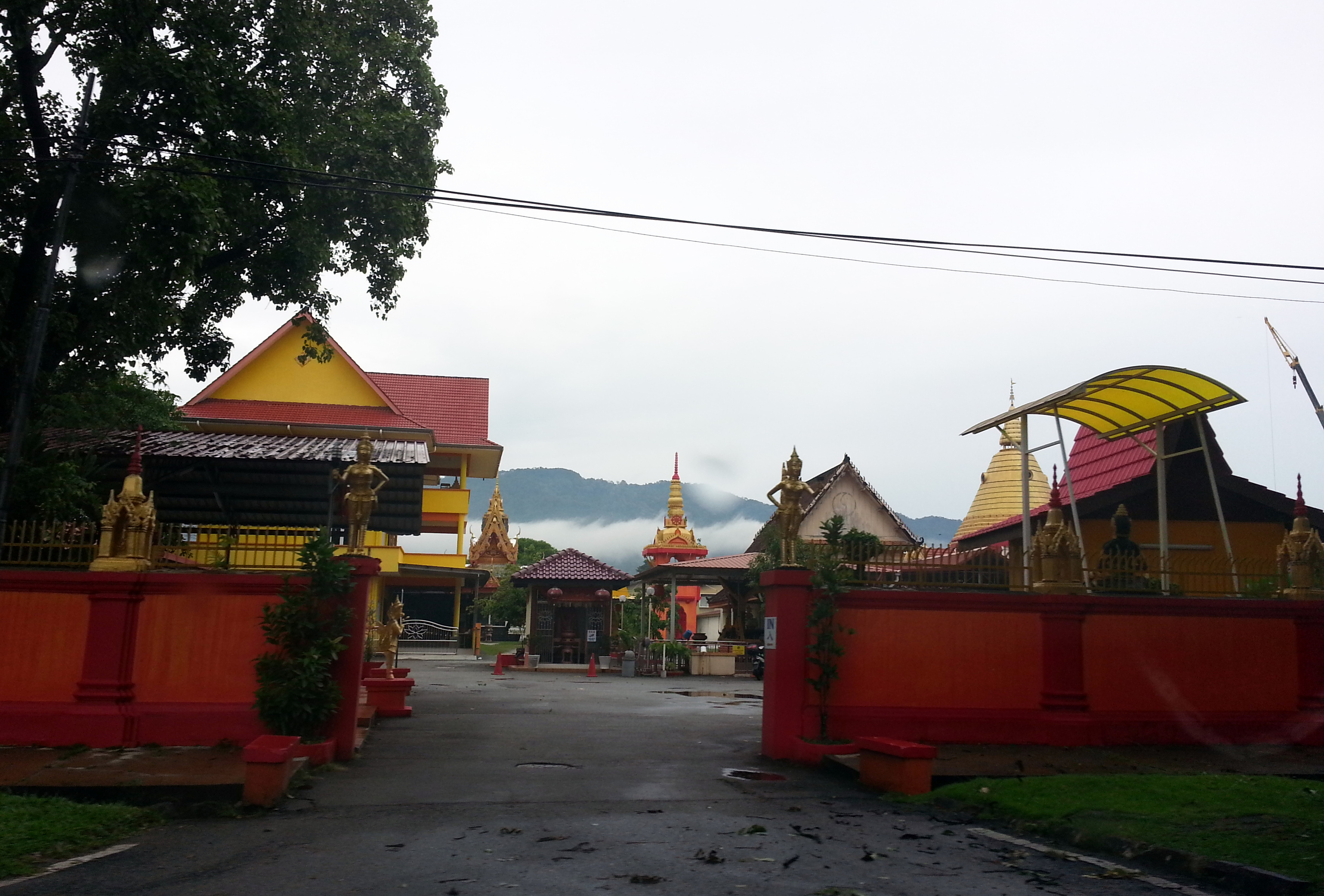
The temple as seen from its second entrance at Jalan Perak.
