= Burmah Road, George Town =

Road in the Malaysian state of Penang

Burmah Road
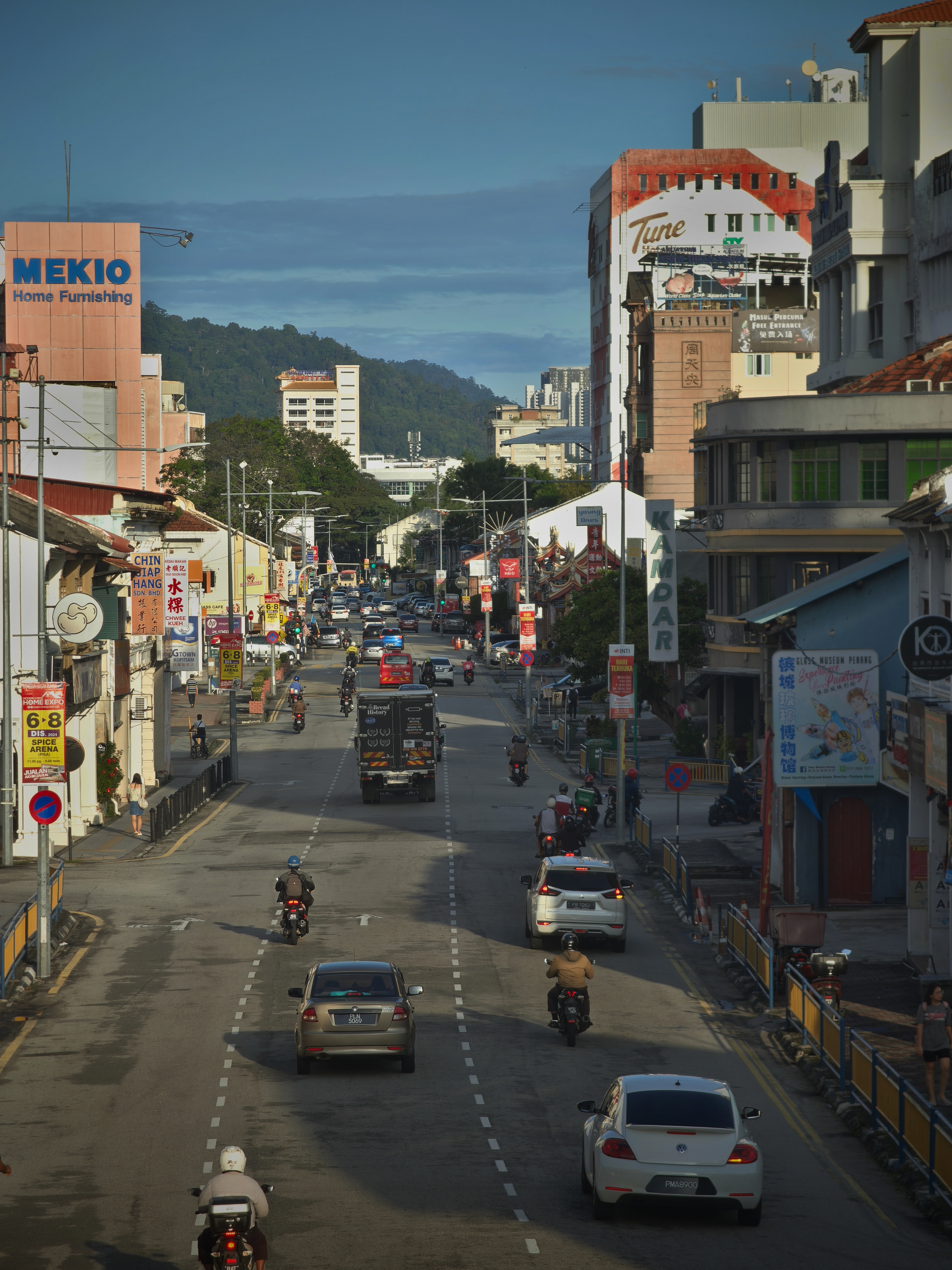
- Native name: Malay: Jalan Burma; Simplified Chinese: 车水路; traditional Chinese: 車水路
- Maintained by: Penang Island City Council
- Length: 3.7 km (2.3 mi)
- Location: George Town
- Coordinates: 5.43114°N 100.31222°E
- West end: Gottlieb Road; Mount Erskine Road; Jalan Bagan Jermal
- East end: Penang Road
- JALAN BURMA Burmah Rd10050 P. PINANG

Burmah Road is a major thoroughfare in the city of George Town within the Malaysian state of Penang. The 3.7 km (2.3 mi) long road is a major artery leading out of the city centre towards the suburb of Tanjong Tokong.

Burmah Road is one of the few places worldwide that was named after the nation state of Burma (now Myanmar). As its name implies, the road was once home to a significant Burmese community. In addition, ethnic Eurasians and Thais still live at or around the vicinity of the road within Pulau Tikus, contributing to the street's multicultural character.

The road is also well known as one of the destinations in the city to sample the famed local cuisine. The most popular hawker centres at Burmah Road are New World Park and the Pulau Tikus Wet Market.

== Etymology ==
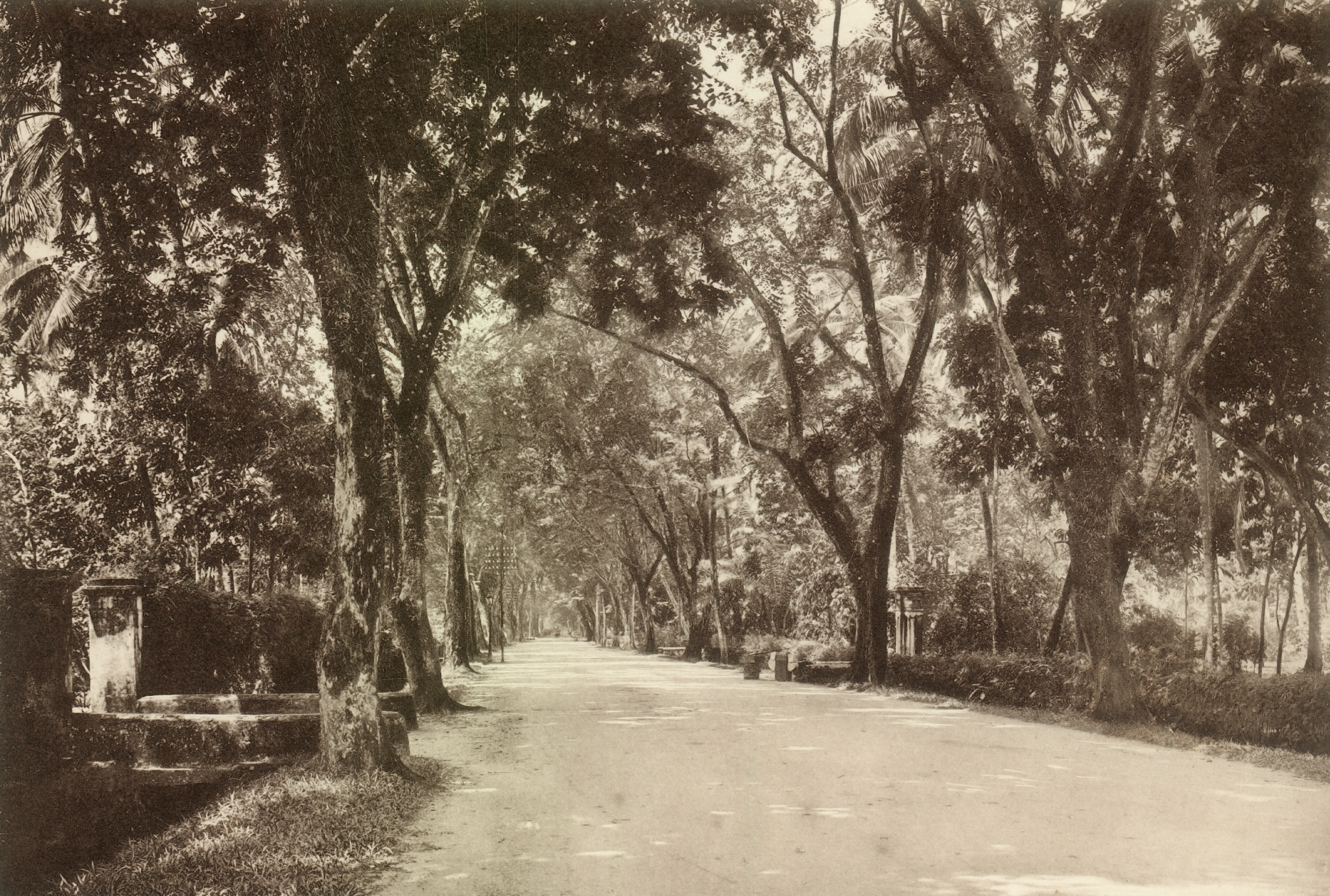
Burmah Road in the 1910s

Burmah Road was named after the Burmese community that used to reside at the road. Upon arriving on Penang Island in the late 18th century, the Burmese established their own settlement, named Kampung Ava, which was located near the road. The Dhammikarama Burmese Temple, which was built within that settlement, still stands to this day as a reminder of the Burmese presence in George Town.

In the olden days, water sourced from the interior of Penang Island had to be carried on ox-carts and pails suspended on shoulder yokes. Burmah Road was the route taken by these water-sellers to reach George Town, hence the road's nickname, 'Jalan Kreta Ayer', which meant 'Water Cart Road' in Malay.

== History ==
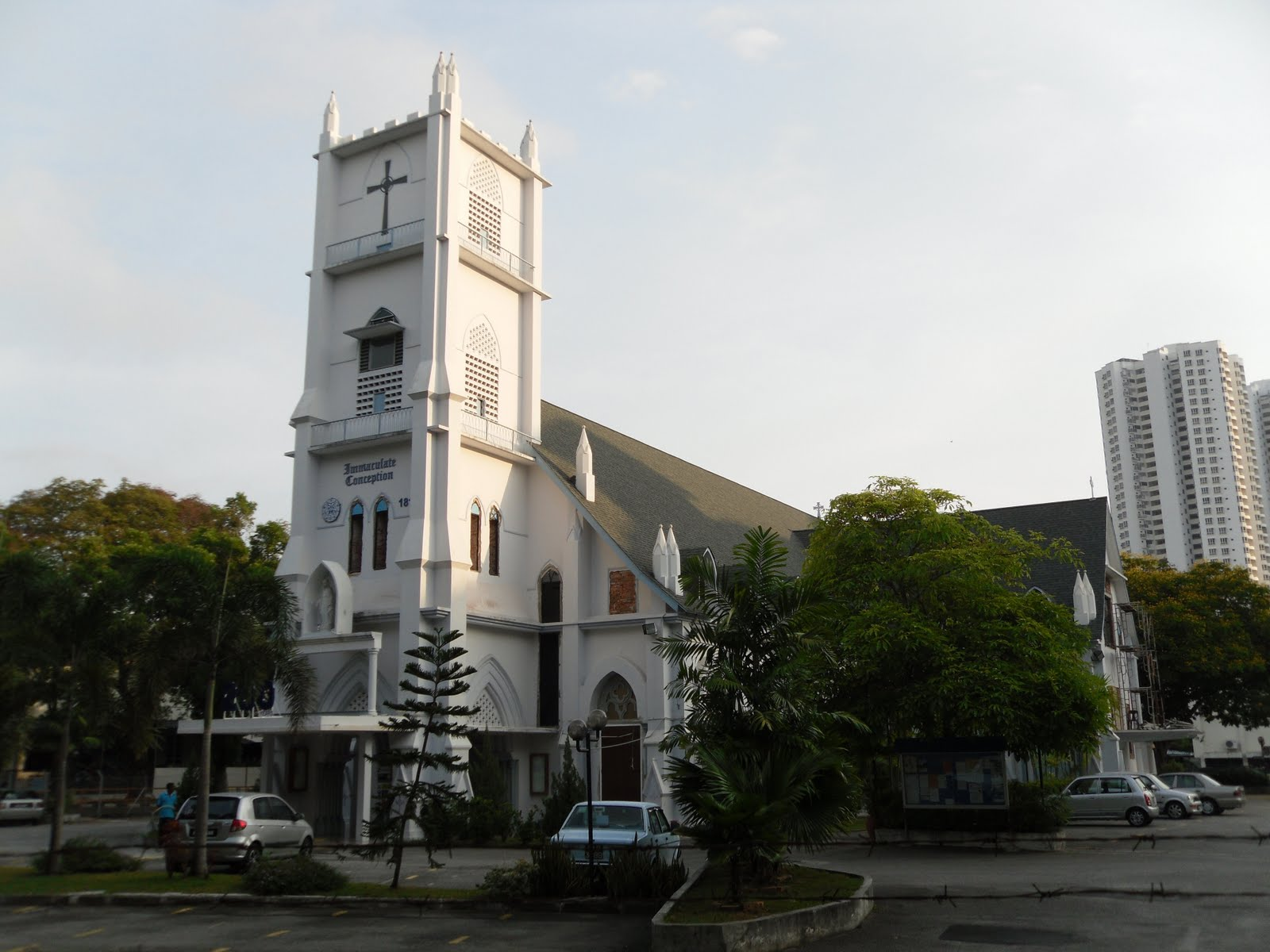
The Church of the Immaculate Conception at Burmah Road

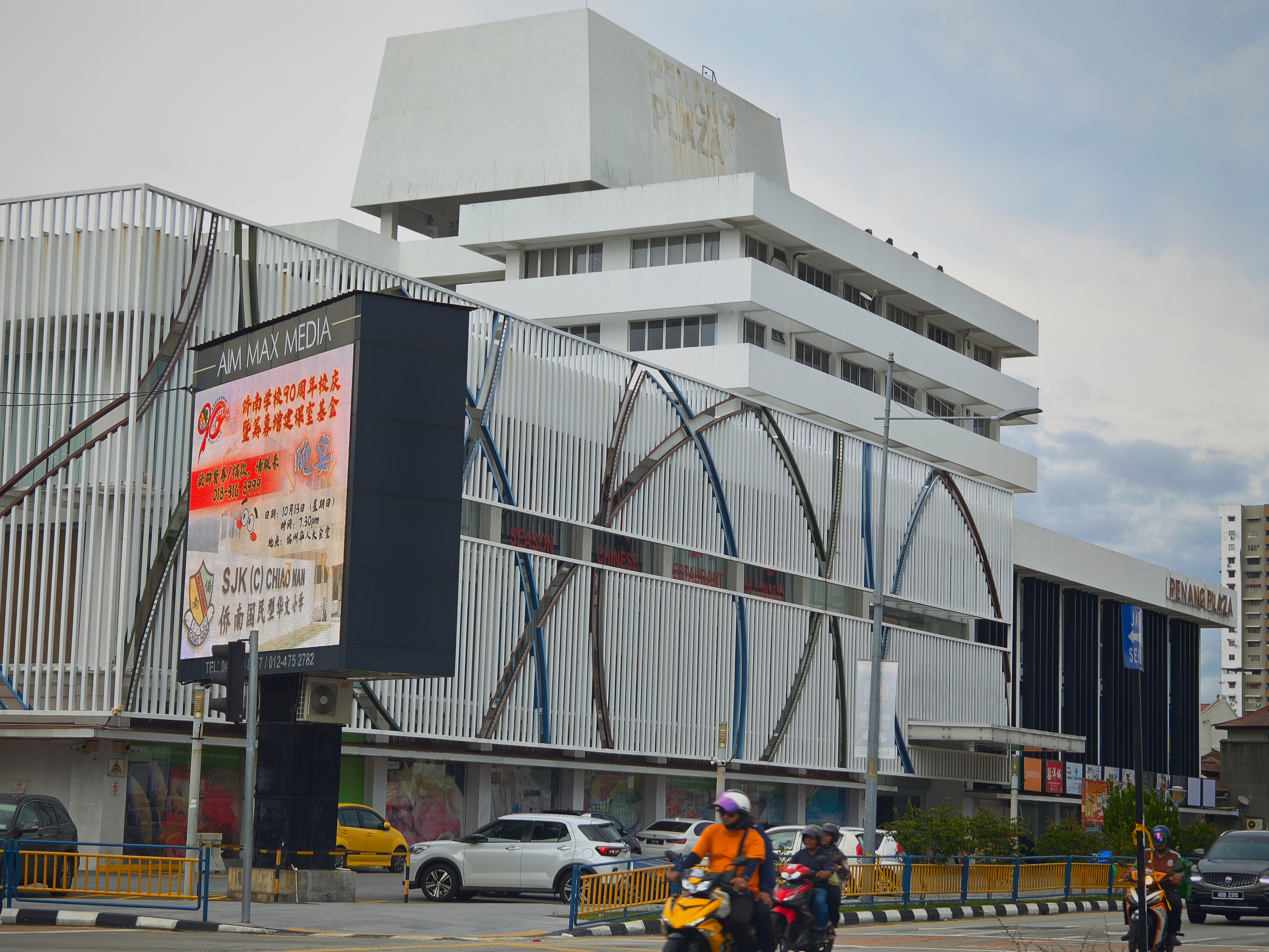
Completed in 1982, Penang Plaza was George Town's first shopping mall.

Burmah Road was originally laid out as a rural road that ran from the settlement of George Town to the villages in Pulau Tikus, cutting through plantations and vegetation that existed outside the settlement at the time.

The eastern city end of Burmah Road, where a pedestrian bridge near Komtar now stands, was actually the site of a bridge that traversed a canal in the area. Prangin Canal, which also lent its name to the adjoining Prangin Road, once stretched all the way up to Transfer Road further west. Thus, a wooden drawbridge, known as Titi Papan, was used to cross the canal; the name is immortalised today by a mosque, Masjid Titi Papan.

Over the centuries, various ethnic communities have resided along Burmah Road, giving it its multicultural character. The western end of the road, which forms an intersection with Cantonment Road, marks the heart of Pulau Tikus and is home to a substantial Eurasian community. The Church of the Immaculate Conception at this particular section of Burmah Road was founded in 1811 by the Eurasians. The Burmese and Thais reside immediately east of the Eurasians. Meanwhile, closer to the city centre, Chinese associations and temples line the street.

Since the latter half of the 20th century, modern urbanisation has also gentrified much of Burmah Road, as the growth of George Town continued westwards and subsumed Pulau Tikus into an affluent suburb of the city.

== Landmarks ==
- Church of the Immaculate Conception
- Queen Victoria Memorial
- Chinese Recreation Club
- New World Park
- Penang Plaza

== Education ==
- Convent Pulau Tikus
- PTPL College

== Health care ==
- Penang Adventist Hospital

== Hotels ==
- Tune Hotel
- Georgetown City Hotel

== Mass media ==
- Radio Televisyen Malaysia Penang Branch Office, also known as RTM Pulau Pinang and Mutiara FM.

== Consulates ==
- Indonesia

== See also ==
- List of roads in George Town
