= DISTED College =

Private college in Penang, Malaysia

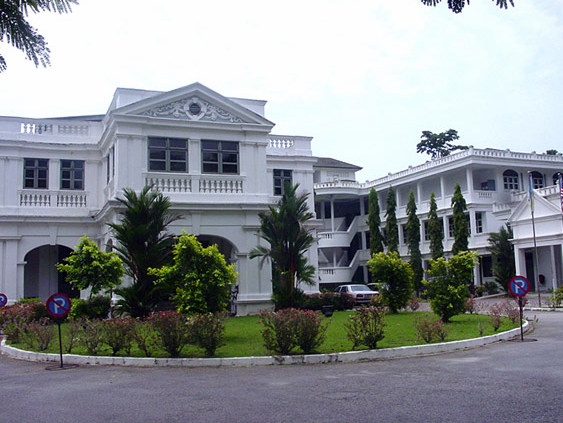
- Main campus at Macalister Road, George Town
- Company type: Private
- Founded: 1987
- Headquarters: Macalister Road5°25′24″N 100°18′27″E, Penang, Malaysia
- Key people: Vikneswaran Nair (President)
- Products: Pre-U Programmes (A-Level, SACEi, Foundation in Arts) Diploma Programmes Degree Programmes by Staffordshire University, UK and HELP University
- Parent: Bonanza Educare Sdn Bhd
- Website: www.disted.edu.my

DISTED College is a private college within George Town, the capital city of the Malaysian state of Penang. It was established in 1987 as the first Penang-based private tertiary institution. The college provides various pre-university, diploma and degree courses, some of which are twinned with foreign universities.

The DISTED Heritage campus is on Macalister Road in close vicinity to downtown George Town, a UNESCO World Heritage Site. The college is wholly owned by Wawasan Open University.

== History ==
DISTED College was the brainchild of three educationists - Gajaraj Dhanarajan, Hulman Sinaga and Sharom Ahmat - who in 1985 formed DISTED Services Sdn Bhd, a private limited company. The name DISTED is the acronym for Distance Education, which suited the original intention of the trio - to provide adults an alternate route to tertiary education; it was felt that, compared to high school leavers, adults had more limited prospects of obtaining higher education.

However, due to the high costs of tertiary courses abroad, the trio soon had to alter their direction to cater to the youth. By 1987, contracts were signed with the British Columbia Open University, TAFE South Australia, Murdoch University and the Warrnambool Institute of Advanced Education to provide off-campus courses to Penangites. Within the same year, DISTED College was registered with Malaysia's Ministry of Higher Education.

DISTED took in its first cohort of students in 1988. At the time, it was housed inside a bungalow at Hargreaves Road in George Town. The lack of space forced the college to relocate to RECSAM within the suburb of Gelugor, and then to the St. Joseph's Novitiate at Kelawei Road (now part of Gurney Paragon).

In 1995, DISTED College finally moved into its current premises at Macalister Road, occupying a mansion formerly owned by a prominent 19th century tycoon, Yeap Chor Ee. The campus was expanded in 1997. DISTED College joined the Bonanza Educare group of schools and learning centres by Bonanza Venture Holdings (BVH) in 2023.

== Academic programmes ==
=== Pre-university ===
- GCE A-Level (provided by Cambridge Assessment International Education)
- South Australian Certificate of Education
- Foundation in Arts

=== Diploma ===
- Diploma in Accounting
- Diploma in Business Information Technology
- Diploma in Business Studies
- Diploma in Computer Science
- Diploma in Creative Multimedia Production
- Diploma in Electrical and Electronic Engineering
- Diploma in Food and Beverage Management
- Diploma in Hotel Management

==== Transfer programmes ====
Students who have graduated with a diploma from DISTED College will have the option of undergoing any one of the transfer programmes with foreign universities.

- Japan
  - Diploma in Computer Science
  - Diploma in Electrical and Electronic Engineering
- Taiwan
  - I-Shou University
    - Diploma in Business Studies
    - Diploma in Creative Multimedia Production
    - Diploma in Hotel Management
- United Kingdom
  - University of Gloucestershire
    - Diploma in Business Studies + Business and Technology Education Council Higher National Diploma
    - Diploma in Computer Science + Business and Technology Education Council Higher National Diploma
    - Diploma in Business Information Technology + Business and Technology Education Council Higher National Diploma
    - Diploma in Creative Multimedia Production + Business and Technology Education Council Higher National Diploma
  - Birmingham City University
    - Diploma in Business Studies + Business and Technology Education Council Higher National Diploma
    - Diploma in Accounting + Business and Technology Education Council Higher National Diploma
  - Middlesex University
    - Diploma in Hospitality Business Management + Business and Technology Education Council Higher National Diploma
    - Diploma in Computer Science + Business and Technology Education Council Higher National Diploma
    - Diploma in Business Information Technology + Business and Technology Education Council Higher National Diploma
  - Solent University
    - Diploma in Creative Multimedia Production + Business and Technology Education Council Higher National Diploma

=== Degrees ===
- HELP University
- Psychology
- Staffordshire University
  - Accounting & Finance
  - International Business Management
  - Marketing Management

=== Other certificates ===
Other courses offered by DISTED include:

- Chartered Certified Accountant (ACCA) from the Association of Chartered Certified Accountants
- Pearson Test of English Academic

== Ratings ==
DISTED College was awarded a five-star rating in the Malaysian Quality Evaluation System (MyQUEST) 2014/2015, which was conducted by Malaysia's Ministry of Higher Education.
