= Central George Town, Penang =

City centre of George Town in Penang, Malaysia

Central George Town
- City centre of George Town and district capital
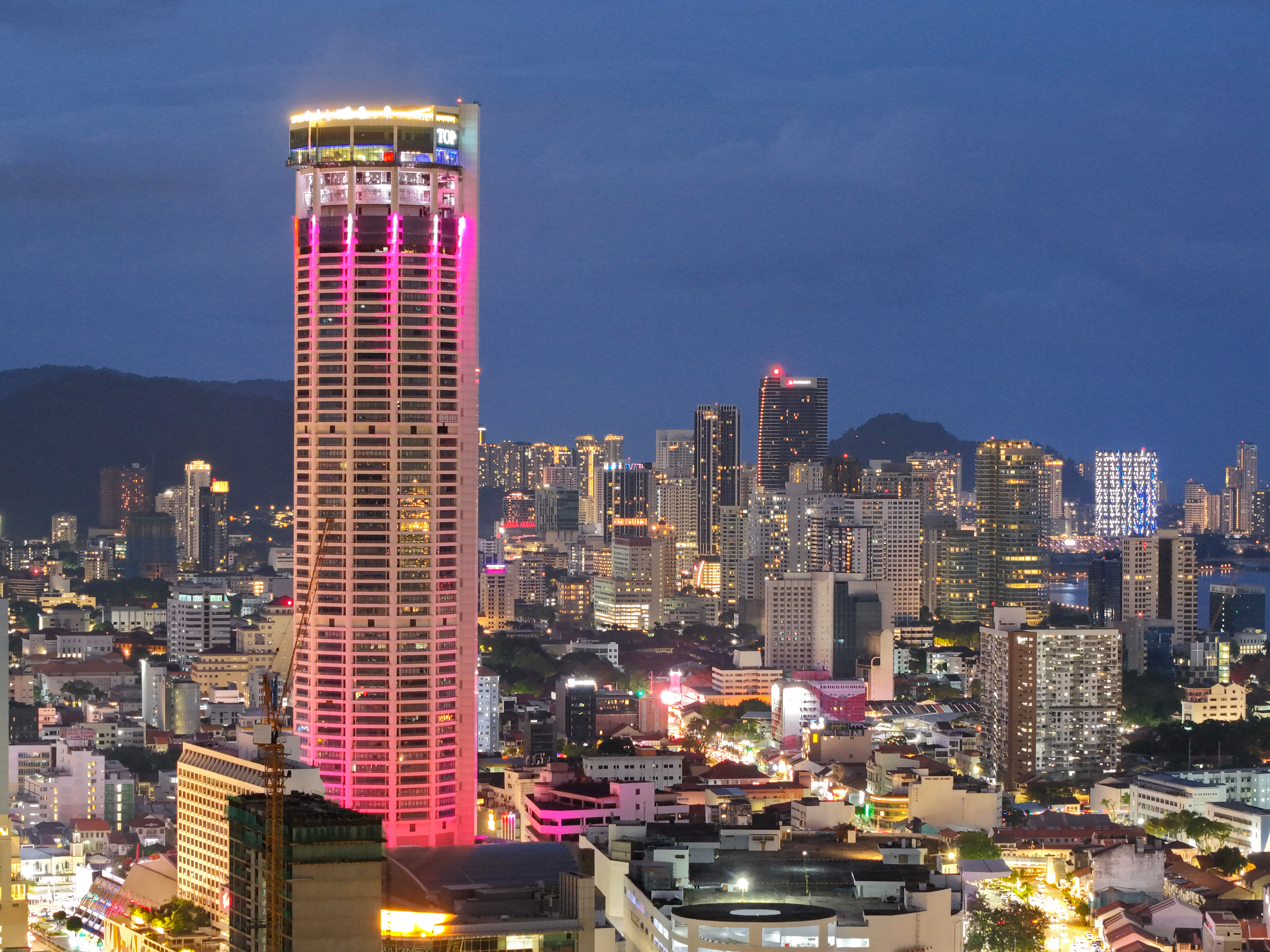
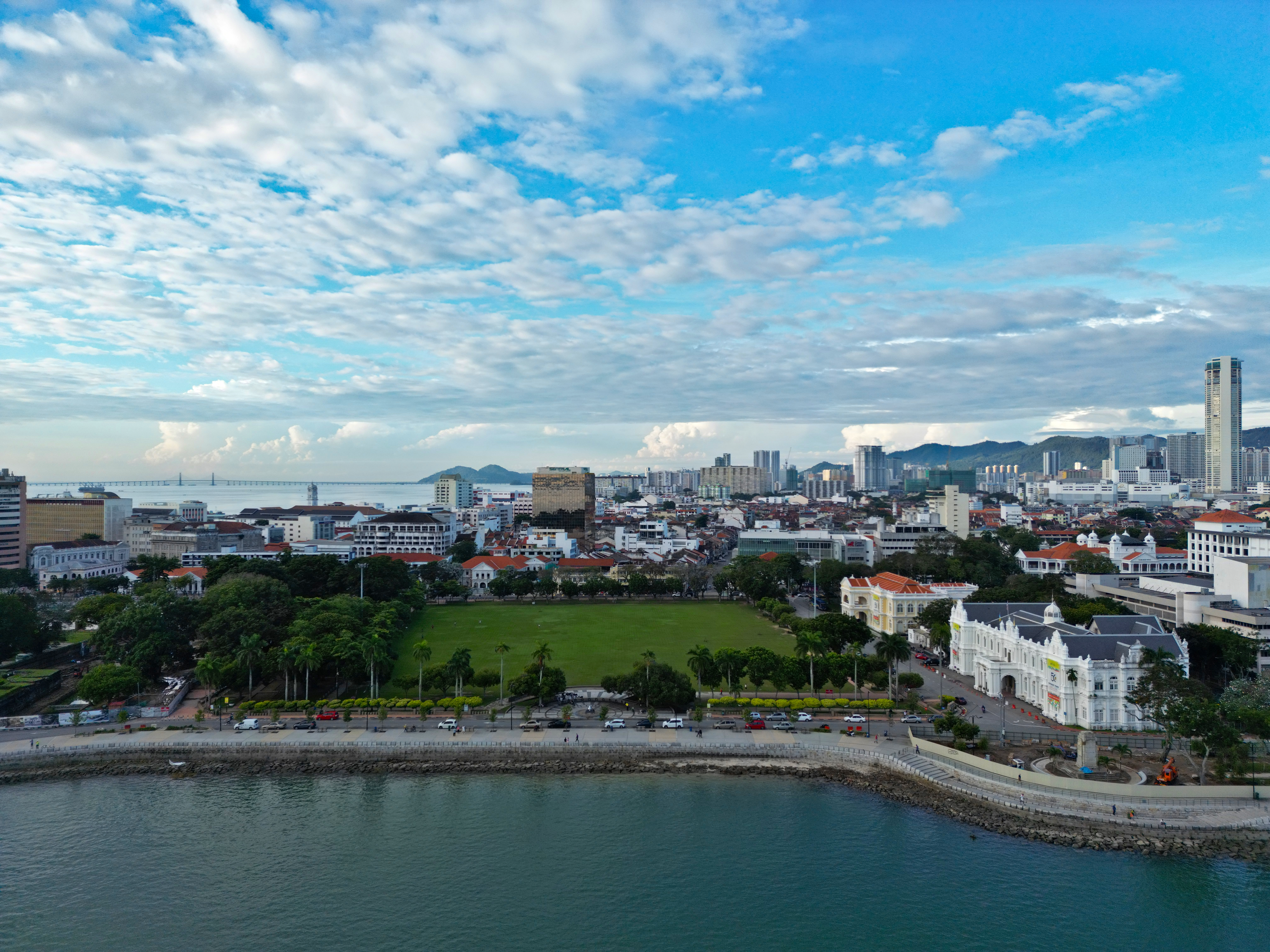
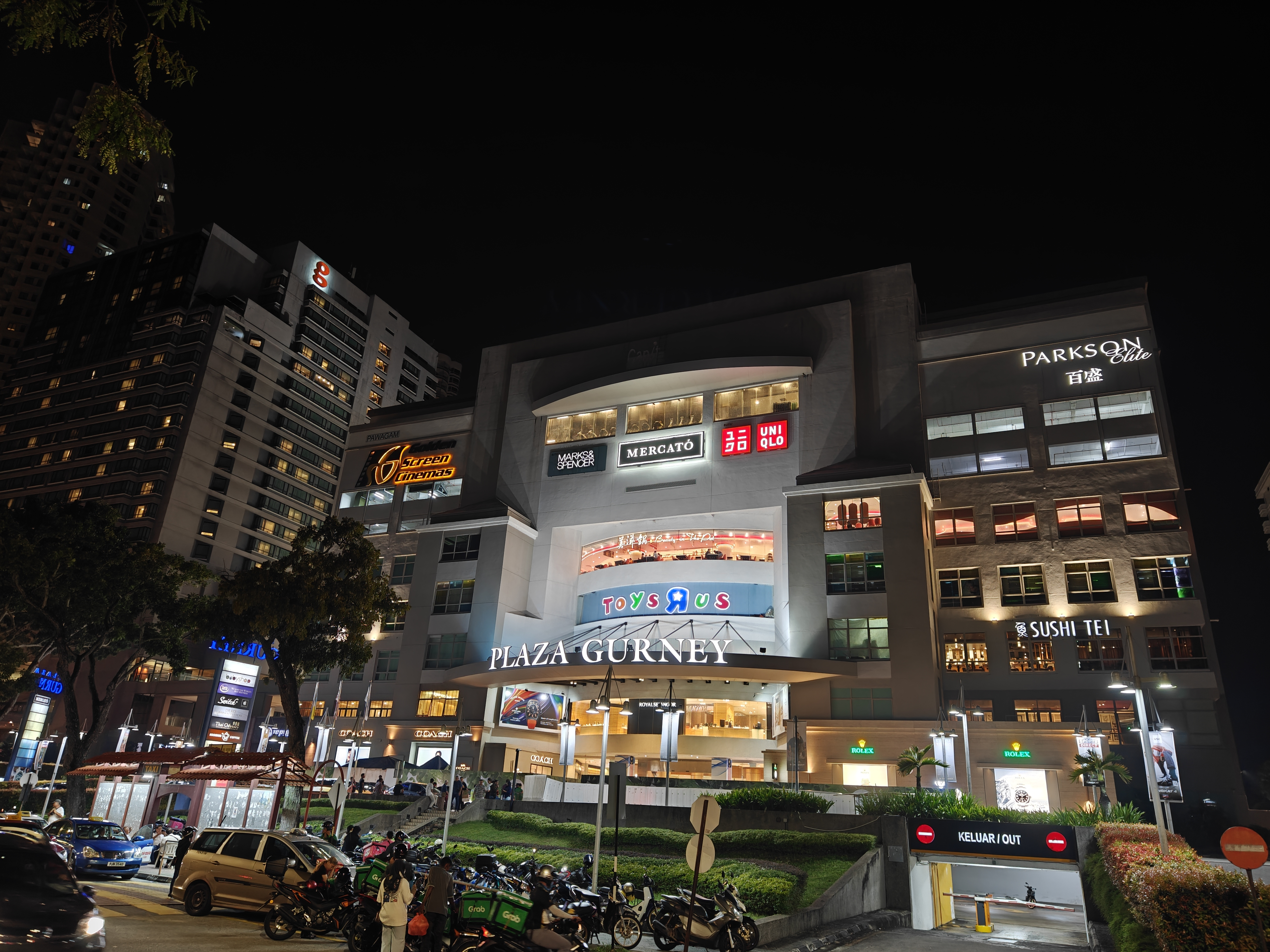
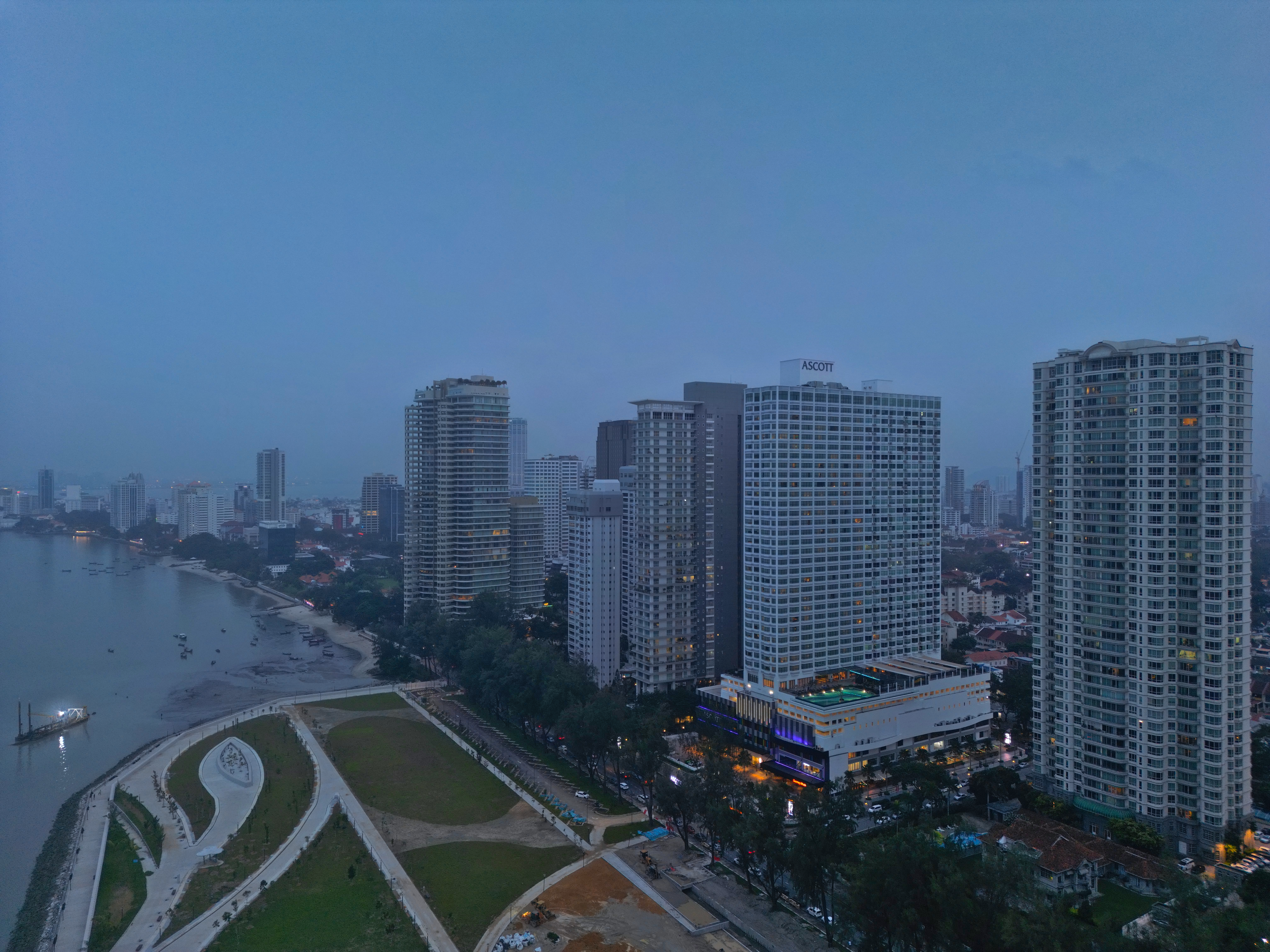
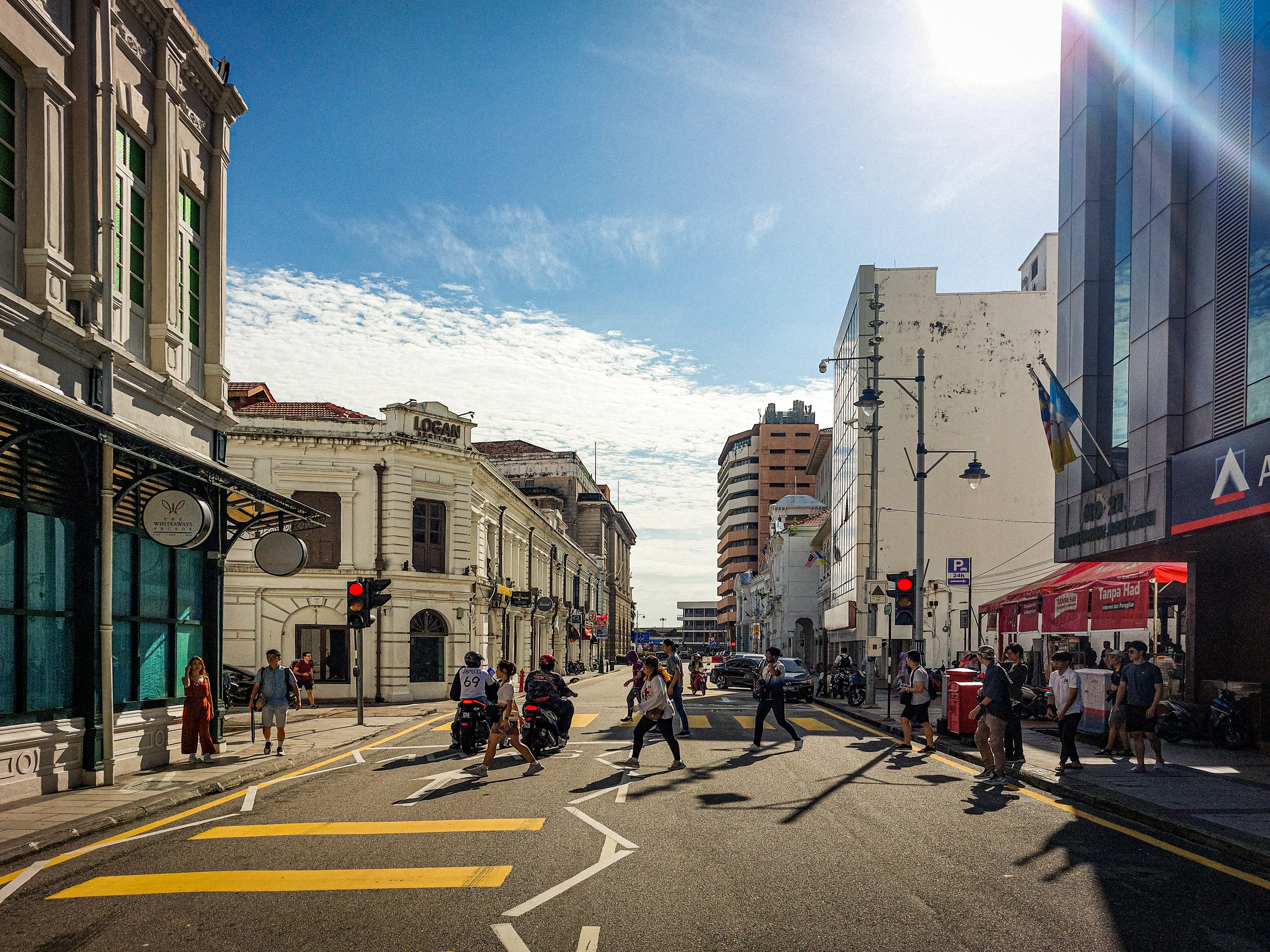
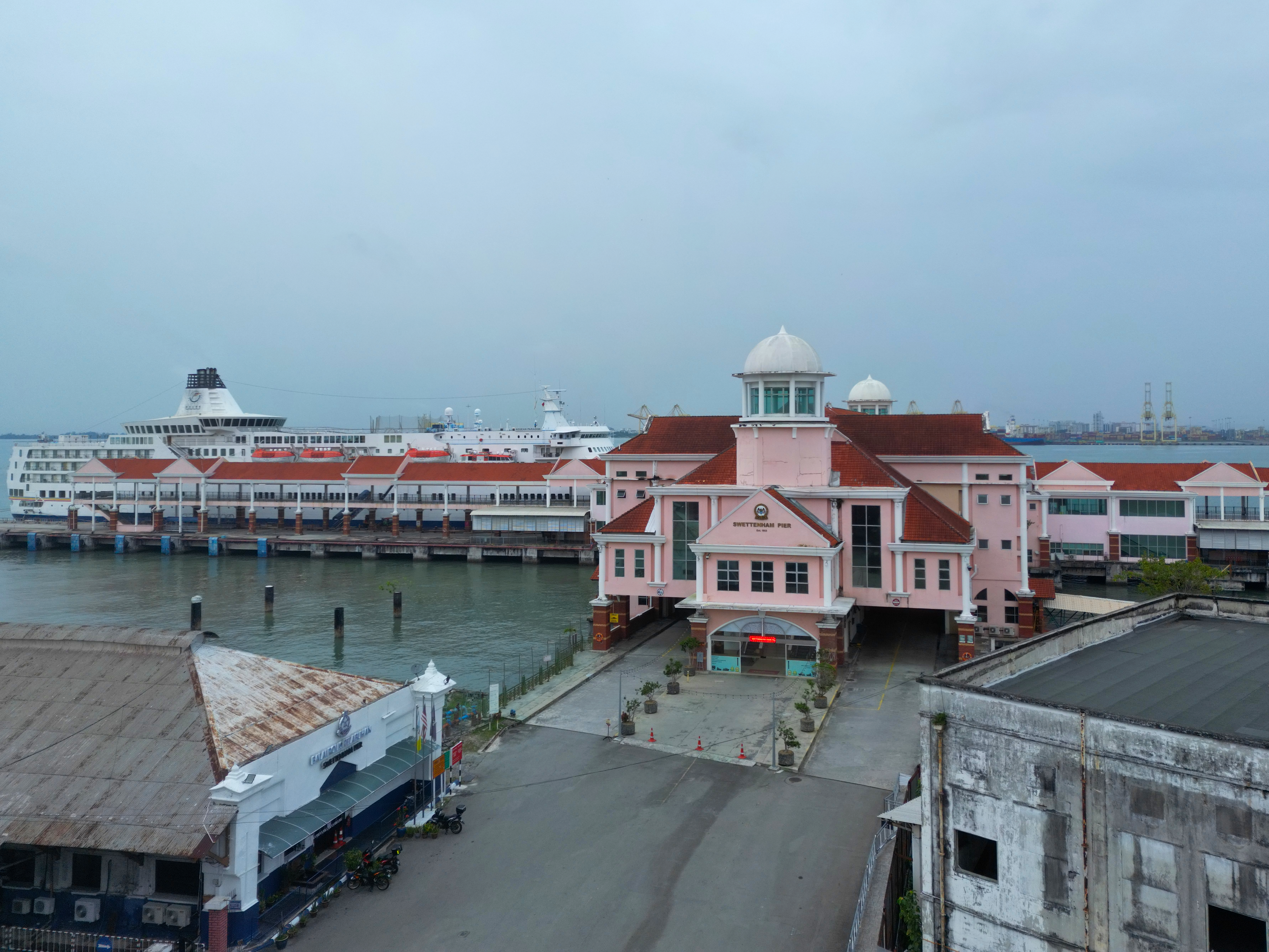
- From top, left to right: Skyline at night; George Town's Esplanade; Gurney Plaza; Skyscrapers within the Central Business District; Beach Street; Swettenham Pier
- Interactive map of Central George Town
- Central George Town is bounded in black within George Town
- Coordinates: 5°25′01″N 100°20′17″E
- Country: Malaysia
- State: Penang
- City: George Town
- District: Northeast
- Incorporated (city): 1 January 1957

Area
  - Total: 25.5 km^{2} (9.8 sq mi)

Population (2020)
  - Total: 158,336
  - Density: 6,210/km^{2} (16,100/sq mi)

Demographics
  - Ethnic groups: 57.2% Chinese; 20.6% Bumiputera; 20.1% Malay; 0.6% indigenous groups from Sabah and Sarawak; 8.8% Indian; 0.7% Other ethnicities; 12.6% Non-citizens
- Time zone: UTC+8 (MST)
  - Summer (DST): Not observed
- Postal code: 100xx

UNESCO World Heritage Site
- Part of: Melaka and George Town, the Historic Cities of the Straits of Malacca
- Criteria: Cultural: ii, iii, iv
- Reference: 1223-002
- Inscription: 2008 (32nd Session)
- Area: 109.38 ha (270.3 acres)
- Buffer zone: 150.04 ha (370.8 acres)

Central George Town is the city centre of George Town, the capital of the Malaysian state of Penang. It corresponds to the eponymous subdivision of George Town, which is mostly identical to the original city limits established when George Town was granted city status in 1957.

Encompassing 19 km^{2} (7.3 sq mi) of the northeastern promontory of Penang Island, the city centre stretches from Gurney Drive in the northwest to The Light Waterfront development in the southeast, encompassing the Central Business District and the 260 ha (2.6 km^{2}) UNESCO World Heritage Site. It is also home to the seats of the executive and legislative branches of the Penang state government.

== History ==
George Town's modern history dates back to 17 July 1786 when Francis Light first set foot at what is now Fort Cornwallis within the downtown area. Over time, the city expanded from the tip of the northeastern cape of Penang Island, eventually reaching its original city limits when it was granted city status in 1957. However, Jelutong was later carved out of the southernmost corner of the city centre as a separate mukim in 1966.

Prior to the independence of Malaya in 1957, George Town had been conferred city status by Queen Elizabeth II, making it the first city within the new nation. In the post-independence years, George Town remained the largest and only city in Malaya. This continued until 1963 when Singapore was incorporated into the Malaysian federation, displacing George Town as the largest city of the country. However, Singapore's expulsion from Malaysia almost two years later left George Town once again as the sole city in Malaysia until 1974 when Kuala Lumpur was granted city status.

The merger of the George Town City Council with the Penang Island Rural District Council in 1974 sparked a debate over George Town's city status that lasted for decades. While George Town was once again conferred city status in 2015, the city's jurisdiction was expanded to cover the entirety of Penang Island and surrounding islets, far beyond George Town's original city limits. Today, the subdivision of George Town is considered the economic and political heart of the city.

== Geography ==
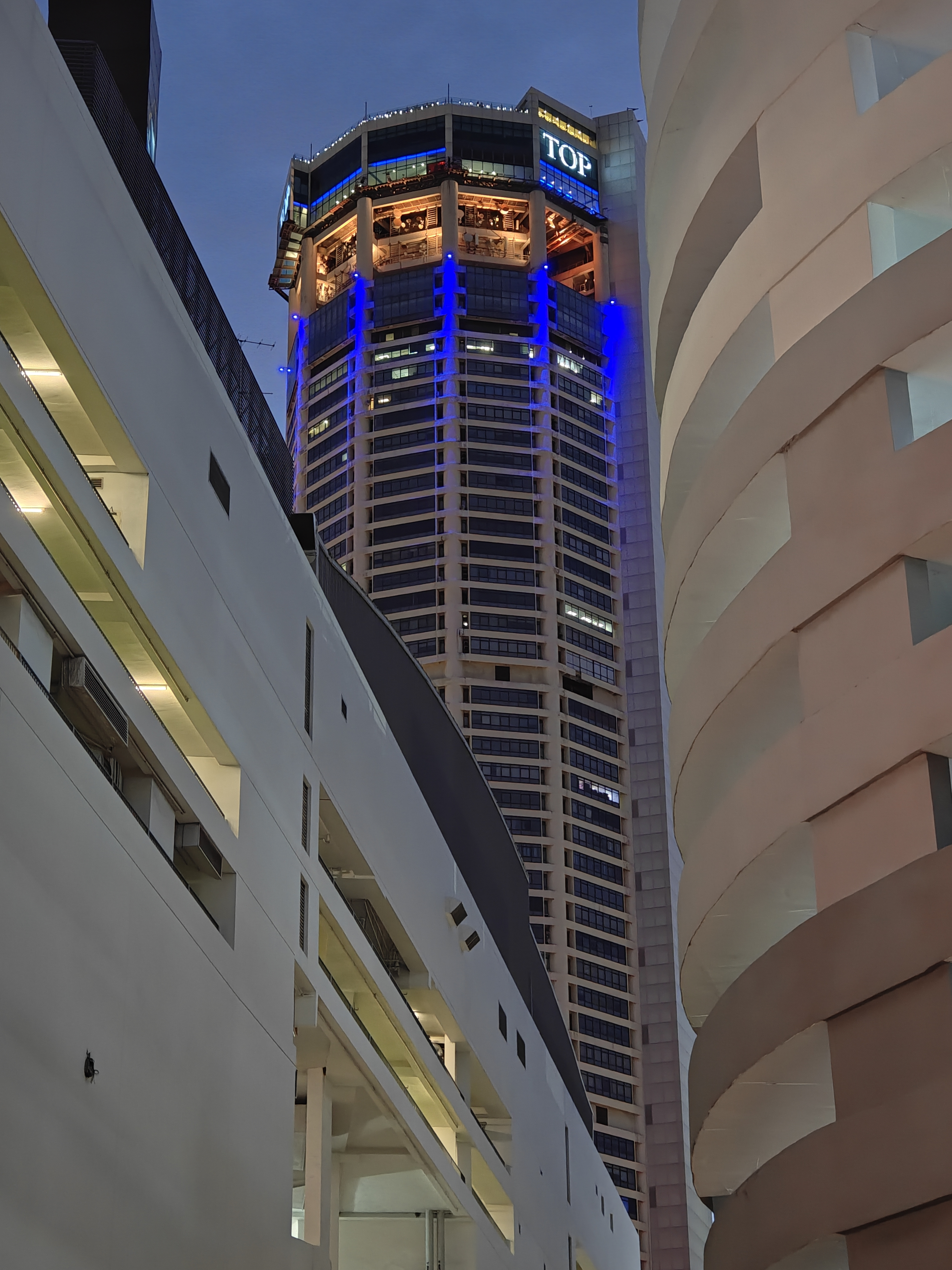
Komtar houses the Office of the Chief Minister of Penang, as well as agencies of the Penang state government and the Penang Island City Council.

The city centre of George Town encompasses 19 km^{2} (7.3 sq mi) of the northeastern plains of Penang Island, forming the basin of the Pinang River, the main river system on the island. Aside from the 260 ha (2.6 km^{2}) UNESCO World Heritage Site which marks the city's old core, the area also includes newer neighbourhoods like Bandar Sri Pinang and The Light Waterfront, which were created through land reclamation since 2000. The city centre shares boundaries with Tanjong Tokong to the northwest, Air Itam to the west, and Jelutong and Gelugor to the south.

The city's Central Business District (CBD), an economic corridor that contains much of George Town's financial and services sectors, lies entirely within the city centre. The UNESCO World Heritage Zone that covers the northeastern tip of Penang Island is entirely encompassed by the CBD.

Map of central George Town.
Click link at the top right corner to zoom in.
1 Central Business District
2 Komtar
3 State Assembly Building
4 High Court
5 Seri Mutiara
6 City Hall
7 Seri Teratai
8 Swettenham Pier
9 Ferry terminal
10 General Hospital
11 Esplanade
12 City Park
13 City Stadium
14 Penang Turf Club
15 Penang Sports Club
16 Pulau Tikus
17 Ayer Rajah
18 Kampong Serani
19 Kampung Siam
20 Clan Jetties
21 People's Court
22 Macallum Street Ghaut
23 Sungai Pinang
24 Dhoby Ghaut
25 Bandar Sri Pinang
26 The Light City
27 Taman Free School
28 The Maritime
29 Japan Consulate
30 China Consulate
31 Indonesia Consulate
32 Thailand Consulate

== Demographics ==
Historical population
Year	Pop.	±%
1911	101,182	—
1921	123,069	+21.6%
1931	149,408	+21.4%
1947	189,068	+26.5%
1957	234,903	+24.2%
1970	269,247	+14.6%
1980	250,578	−6.9%
1991	219,603	−12.4%
2000	180,573	−17.8%
2010	198,298	+9.8%
2020	158,336	−20.2%

Ethnicities within the city centre in 2020
Ethnicities / Nationality	Percentage
Chinese	57.2%
Malays	20.1%
Other Bumiputeras	0.6%
Indians	8.8%
Others	0.7%
Non-Malaysians	12.6%

As of 2020, the city centre was home to 158,336 residents, or nearly 1/5 of George Town's total population. In spite of being the commercial and political heart of Penang however, the city centre has witnessed a decline in population since the late 20th century, owing to the rapid industrialisation and economic growth of the suburbs, coupled with the repeal of the Rent Control Act in 2001.

Ethnic Chinese constituted more than 57% of the area's population, while Malays formed another one-fifth of the population. Indians comprised close to 9% of the city centre's population. Little India, an ethnic enclave within the Central Business District (CBD), retains significant cultural influences from the Indian subcontinent. The city centre remains relatively popular among expatriates within George Town, accounting for 12.6% of the city centre's population.

== Economy ==
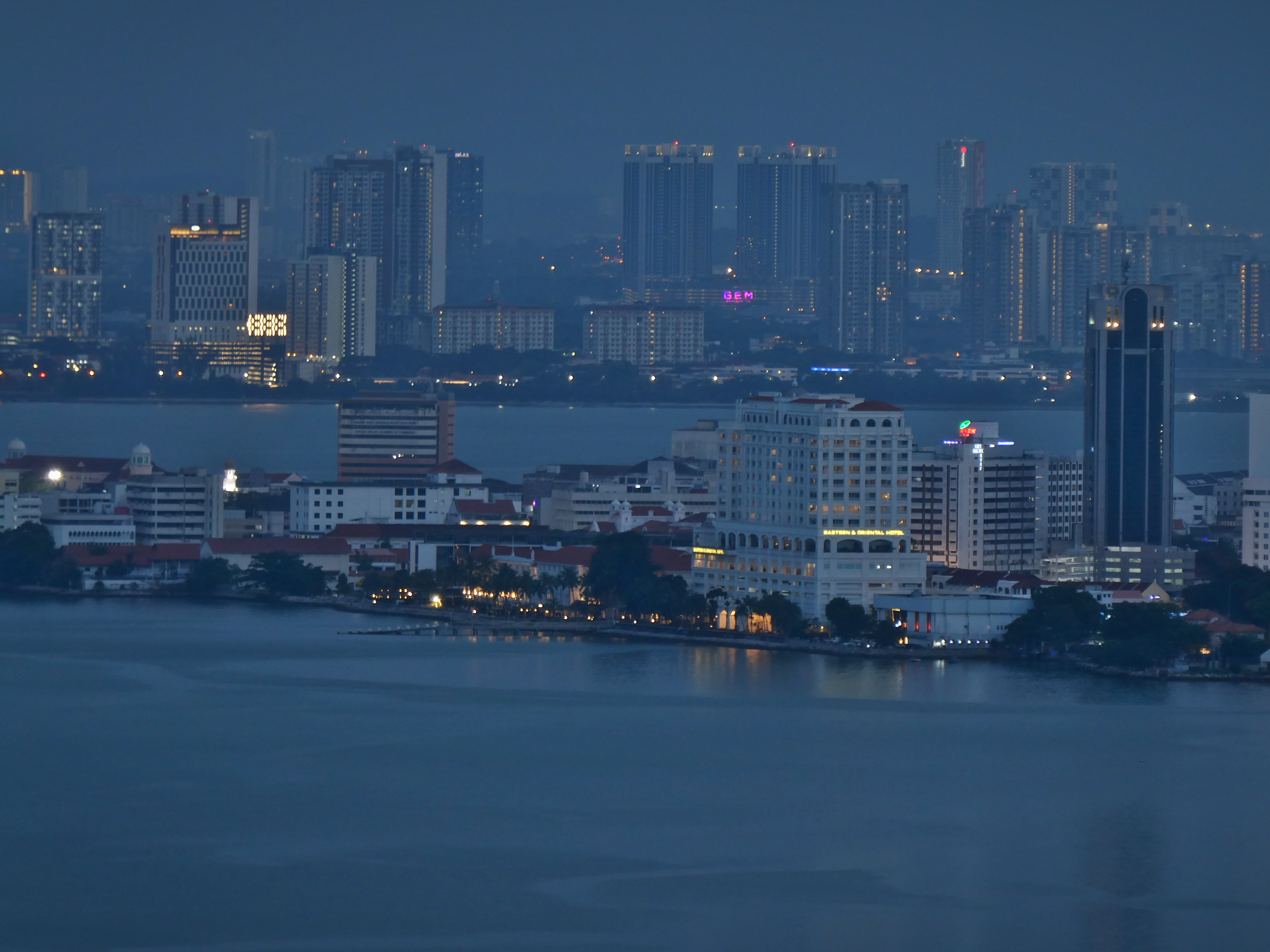
The "Penang Bay" initiative envisions greater economic integration between the city centre (foreground) and Butterworth (background).

In recent years, Penang authorities, under the governance of Pakatan Harapan, have begun introducing measures to diversify the economy within the city centre. These included exploring the economic synergies between the city centre and Butterworth on the mainland under the "Penang Bay" concept.

=== Finance ===
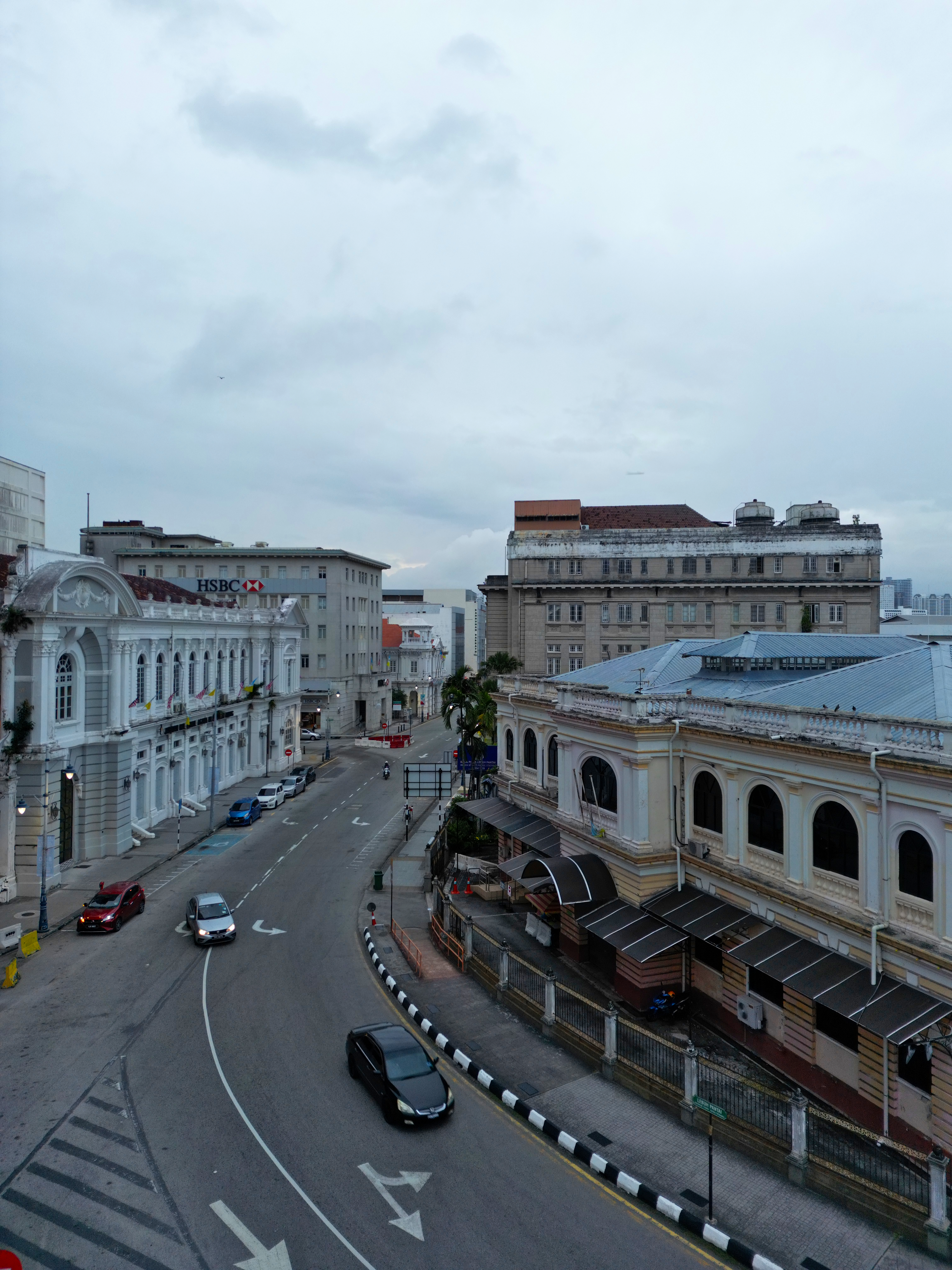
Beach Street is now home to several major banks, including Bank of China, OCBC and HSBC.

Since its inception, the city centre of George Town has functioned as the financial hub of Penang. In the late 19th century, George Town emerged as the primary financial centre of British Malaya, attracting major international banks such as Standard Chartered, HSBC, and the Royal Bank of Scotland. Most of these banks formed a financial cluster in the vicinity of Beach Street.

Today, much of George Town's financial services remain concentrated within the Central Business District (CBD). The CBD is home to international banks, federal financial institutions like Bank Negara and the Employees Provident Fund, and ancillary services such as auditing, market intelligence and legal firms. The Penang Island City Council's Local Plan 2030 proposed the CBD as one of the city's four economic corridors, along with the Bayan Baru–Bayan Lepas, Tanjong Tokong–Tanjong Bungah and Batu Ferringhi–Teluk Bahang corridors. Encompassing areas such as the city's UNESCO World Heritage Site, Pulau Tikus, Kampung Siam, Kampong Serani and Ayer Rajah, the CBD was envisioned as the centre for financial and service sectors, with the aim of enhancing George Town's position as a global city.

=== Retail ===
The city centre is home to a flourishing retail industry that combines modern shopping malls with traditional shophouses. The Central Business District (CBD) houses several of the city's most popular malls, including Gurney Plaza, Gurney Paragon, 1st Avenue, Prangin Mall, Komtar, GAMA and Penang Times Square. In 2022, Gurney Plaza and Komtar were among the top five destinations in Penang among domestic tourists. In addition, markets and traditional shops, such as Chowrasta Market, offer a wide array of local products like spices, nutmegs and Tambun biscuits, a delicacy unique to the state. Upcoming retail complexes within the city centre include the 680,000 sq ft (63,000 m^{2}) Waterfront Shoppe at the coastal precinct of The Light Waterfront.

=== Services ===
Due to the UNESCO World Heritage Site's increasing popularity as a tourist destination, there has been a significant increase in the number of accommodation, food and beverages (F&B), and other hospitality-related businesses within the area. According to a Think City report in 2021, a decade after the UNESCO listing, hotels occupied almost 18% of the heritage zone's land use, which is the highest among all business categories. This shift was attributable to the surge in tourist arrivals, which also caused a significant economic shift from financial to hospitality services.

== Education ==
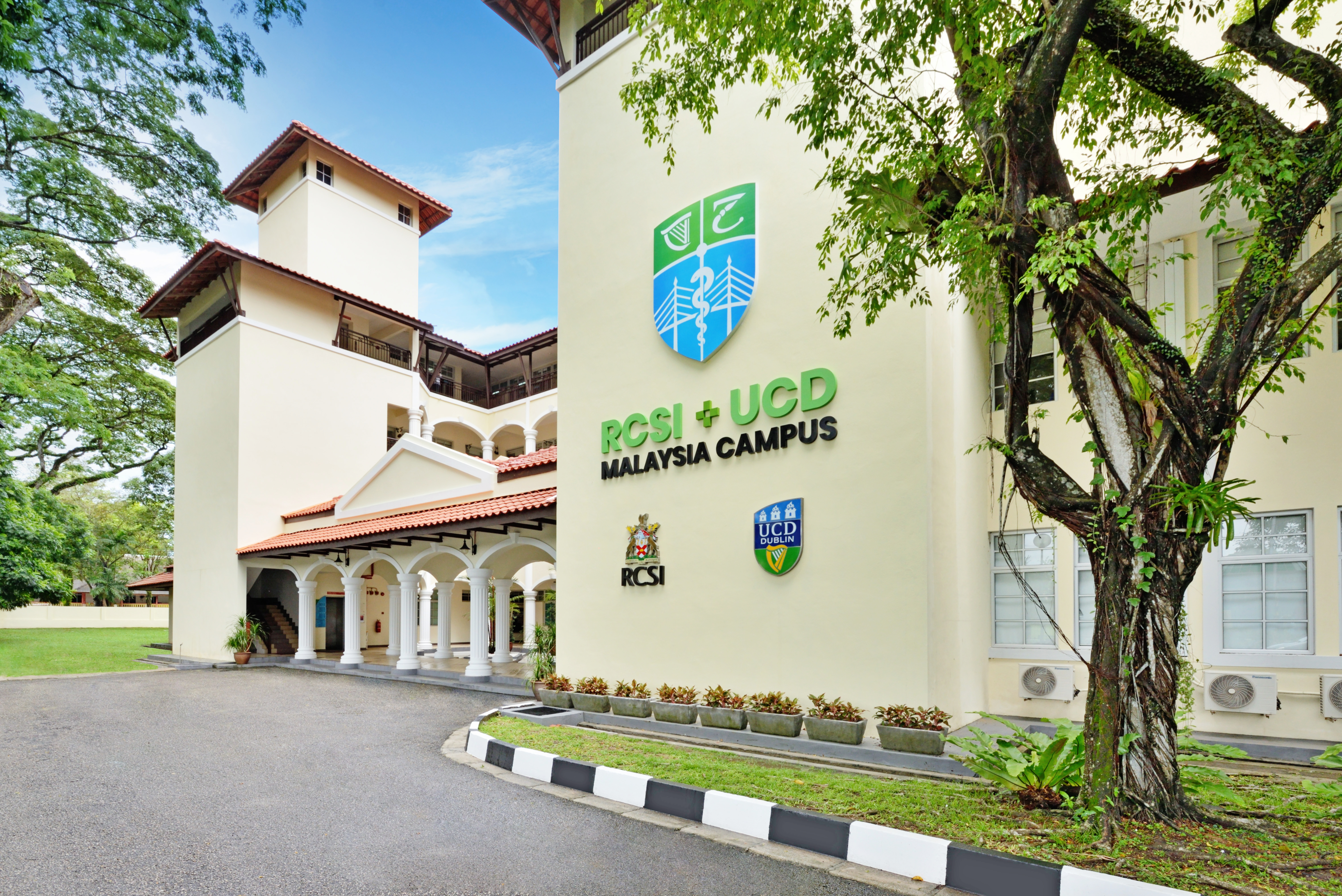
The RCSI & UCD Malaysia Campus is an international campus of two Irish universities – Royal College of Surgeons in Ireland and University College Dublin.

The city centre hosts several prominent secondary schools that were established during British rule. Founded in 1816, Penang Free School is the oldest English school in Southeast Asia. British colonial rule had also encouraged the growth of mission schools such as St. Xavier's Institution, St. George's Girls' School and Methodist Boys' School, all of which are located within the city centre. In addition, the city centre is home to three international and expatriate schools – Penang Japanese School, St. Christopher's International Primary School and Wesley Methodist School Penang.

The area is also a tertiary education hub, housing a significant number of private colleges and universities such as Wawasan Open University, Han Chiang University College of Communication, DISTED College and RCSI & UCD Malaysia Campus. In 2016, the Penang state government inaugurated the Penang Digital Library, a first-of-its-kind facility in Malaysia situated within the Penang Free School compound. The library provides structured access to more than 3,000 specially-curated ebooks.

== Health care ==
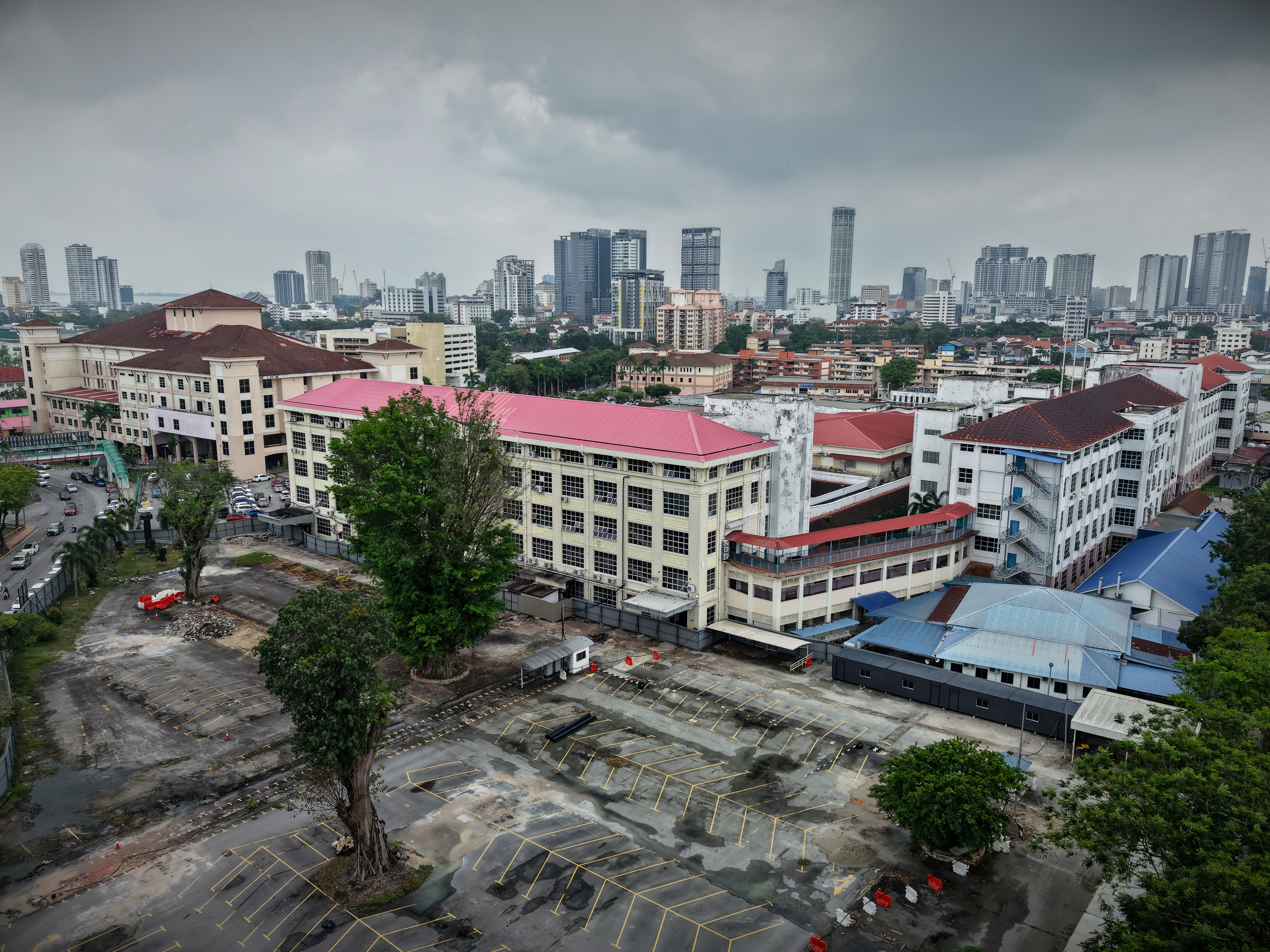
Penang General Hospital is the main public hospital in George Town.

The 1,100-bedded Penang General Hospital within the city centre serves as the main tertiary referral hospital within northwestern Malaysia. Aside from the public hospital, the city centre is a popular destination for medical tourism, boasting some of Penang's leading private hospitals such as Penang Adventist Hospital, Gleneagles Hospital, Island Hospital and Loh Guan Lye Specialists Centre. The private hospitals in Penang have contributed significantly to the growth of medical tourism in the state, generating a revenue of more than RM356 million in 2022 from medical tourist arrivals.

== Sports ==
The City Stadium is the home ground of Penang FC, the professional football club that represents Penang in interstate tournaments. The city centre is also home to the oldest equestrian centre in Malaysia – the Penang Turf Club, which was established in 1864. It is among the few venues in the country that hosts thoroughbred racing events, with the others being the Perak Turf Club and Selangor Turf Club.

== Transportation ==
A ferry off the Raja Tun Uda Ferry Terminal within the Central Business District

Penang Road, Dato Keramat Road, Gurney Drive, Northam Road and Green Lane are some of the centuries-old municipal roads that still serve as major thoroughfares within the city centre. The George Town Inner Ring Road, which comprises Gurney Drive, Jalan Pangkor, Jalan Perak and Jalan Sungai Pinang, forms a loop within the city centre.

Additionally, the city centre is home to Swettenham Pier, the busiest port-of-call for cruise shipping in Malaysia, and the Raja Tun Uda Ferry Terminal, which provides a ferry service linking the city centre with mainland Seberang Perai. Most of Rapid Penang's city-wide routes also originate from the Komtar bus terminal, which acts as the central public bus terminal for the city. In a bid to reduce reliance on private vehicles and traffic congestion, the Penang state government introduced LinkBike, a public bicycle-sharing system, within the city centre in 2017.

== Infrastructure ==
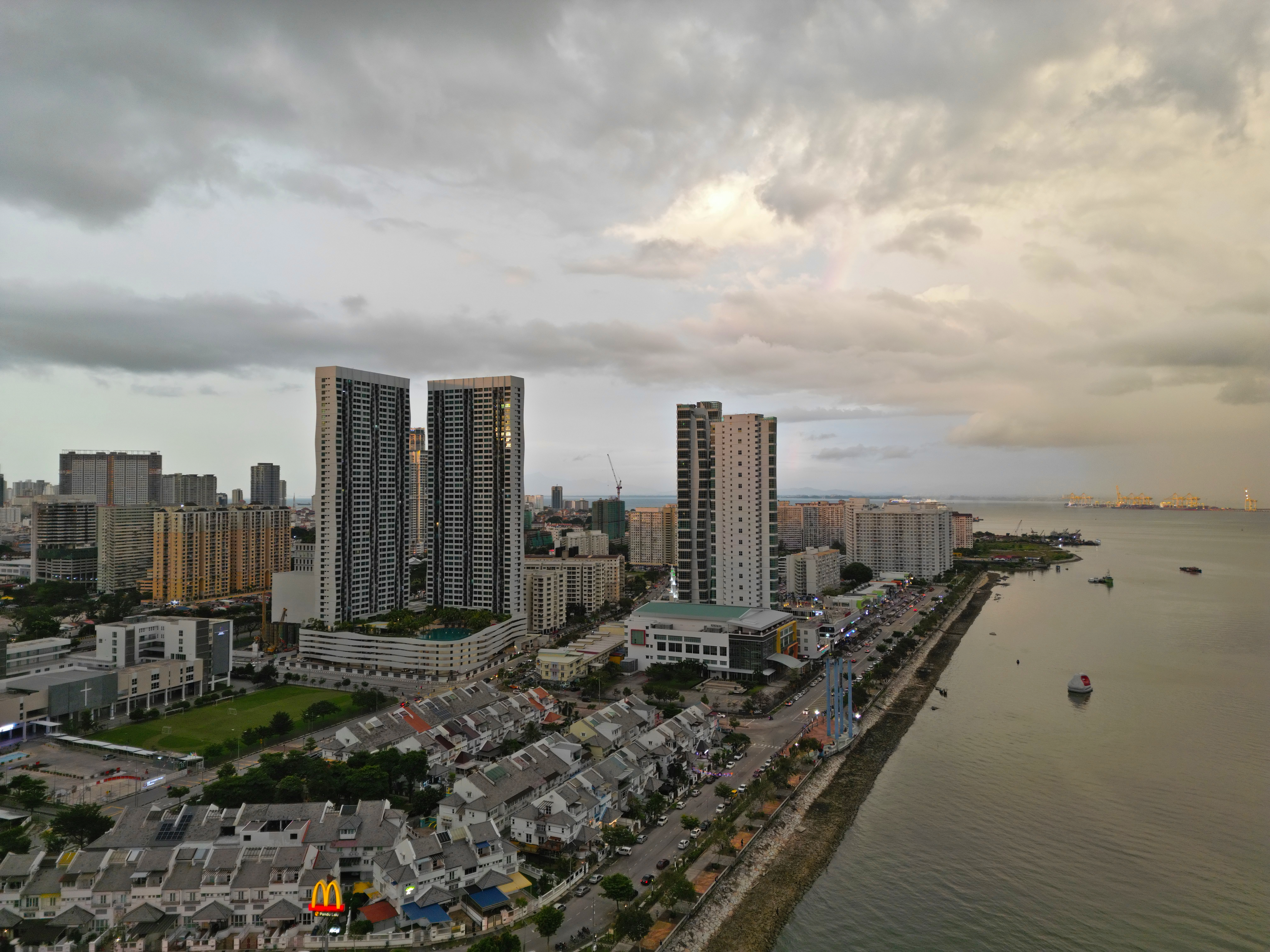
Karpal Singh Drive is a waterfront promenade that was created by IJM Corporation through land reclamation.

Land reclamation has a long history within the city centre, dating back to the 19th century when British administrators reclaimed a section of the present-day coastline Beach Street. However, it wasn't until the end of the 20th century that extensive land reclamation was carried out to provide more valuable land for development, such as at Macallum Street Ghaut, Bandar Sri Pinang and The Light Waterfront. A joint venture by IJM Corporation and Singapore's Perennial Holdings, the latter development will comprise retail and residential components, as well as a new convention centre and a performing arts centre.

To address the worsening traffic congestion in Penang, the state government has planned to introduce urban rail throughout the state, which includes the proposed 29 km (18 mi) Mutiara LRT line that stretches through the city centre. This light rail line is envisioned to have an interchange station at Komtar, linking the city centre with Penang Sentral in Seberang Perai, and with the Penang International Airport to the south.
