= Bandar Sri Pinang =

- Neighbourhood
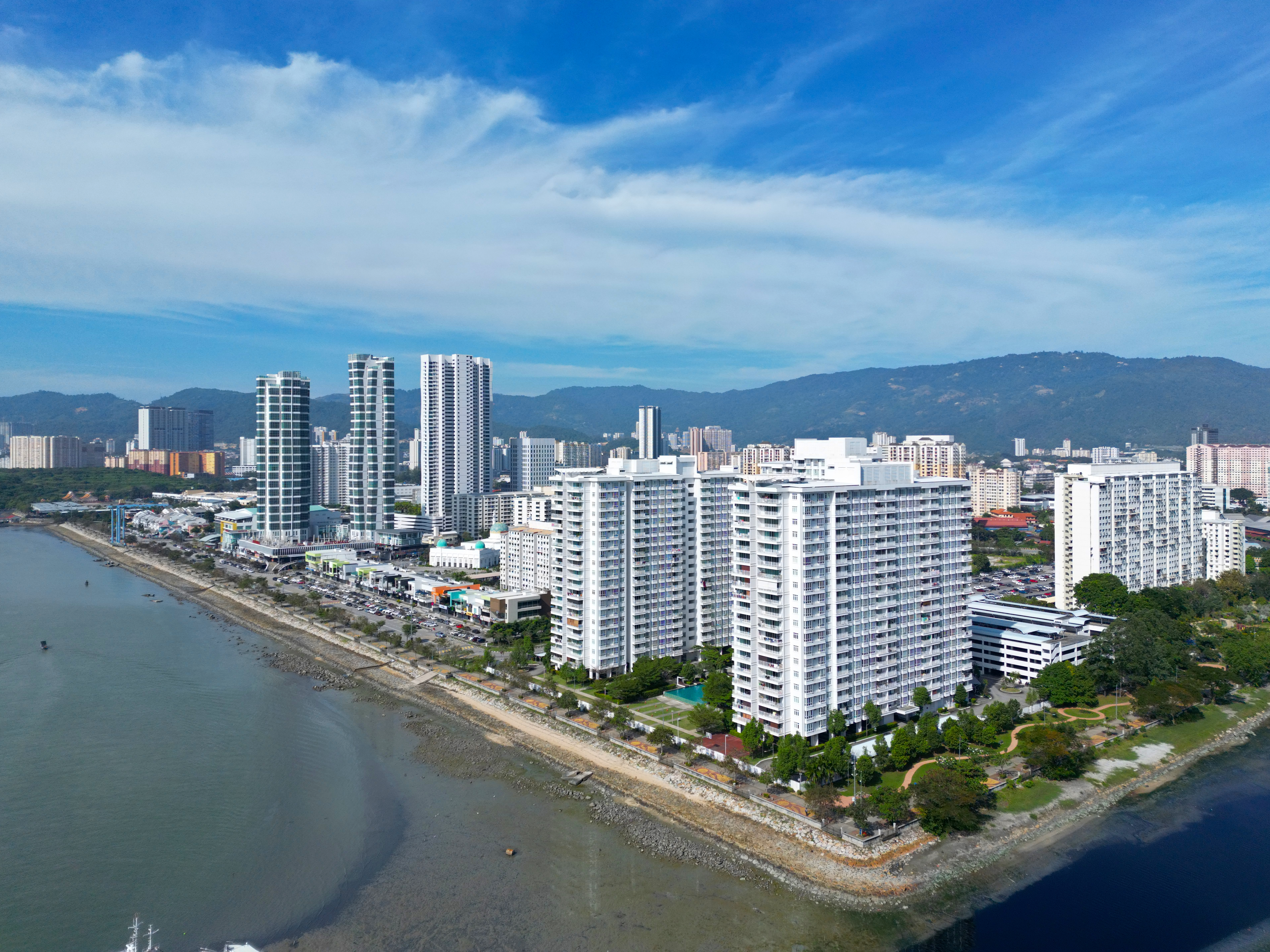
- Interactive map of Bandar Sri Pinang
- Location within George Town in Penang
- Coordinates: 5°23′48.09″N 100°19′42.61″E
- Country: Malaysia
- State: Penang
- City: George Town
- District: Northeast
- Founded: 2014
- Time zone: UTC+8 (MST)
  - Summer (DST): Not observed
- Postal code: 11600

Bandar Sri Pinang is a residential neighbourhood within the city of George Town in the Malaysian state of Penang. Situated within the city centre, it is bounded by the Pinang River to its north and the Tun Dr Lim Chong Eu Expressway to its west. Comprising a mix of low-cost and luxury residential, commercial and light industrial developments, the neighbourhood was formed in 2014 through land reclamation by Malaysian conglomerate IJM Corporation.

== History ==
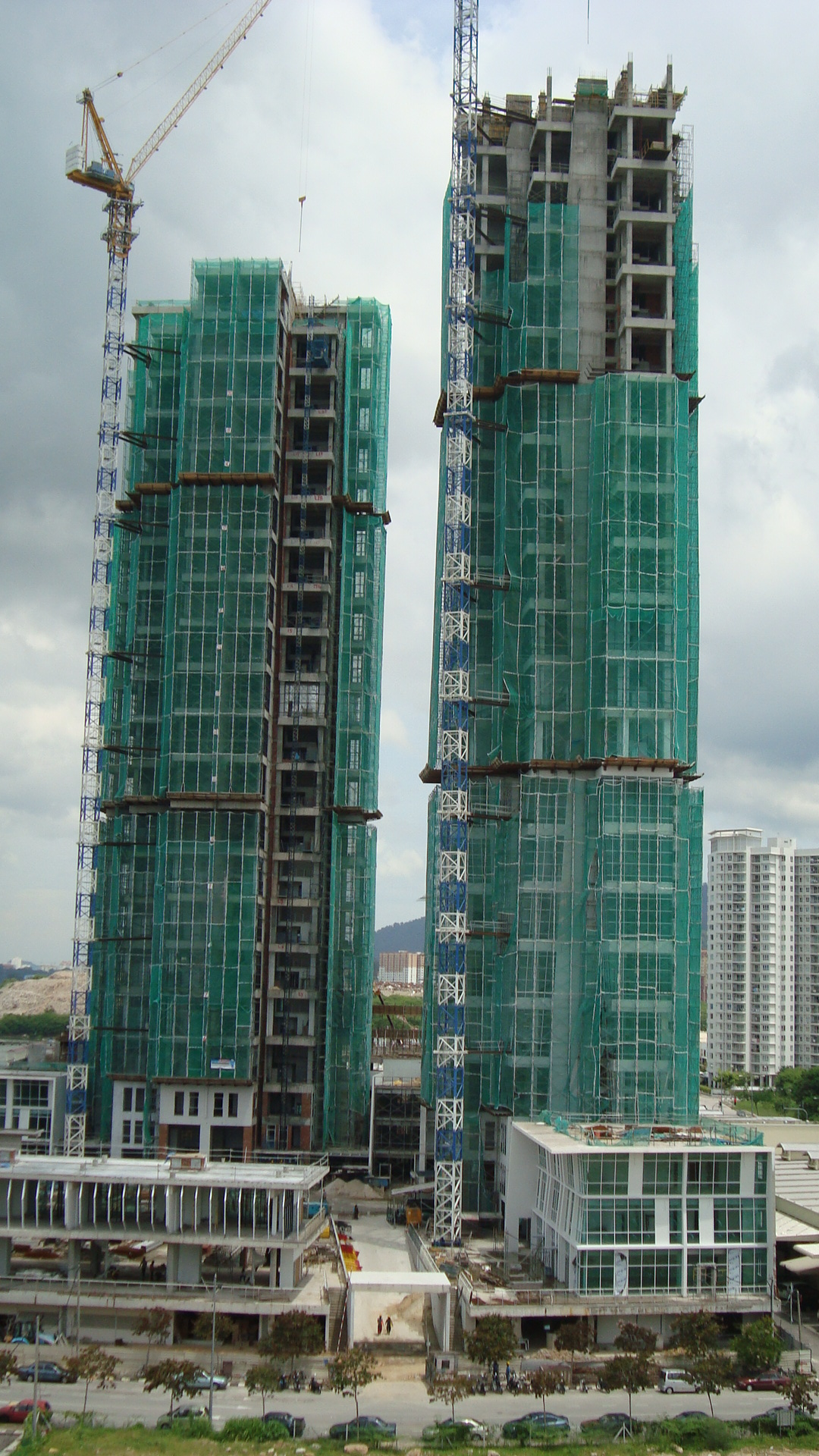
Construction of The Maritime in 2013

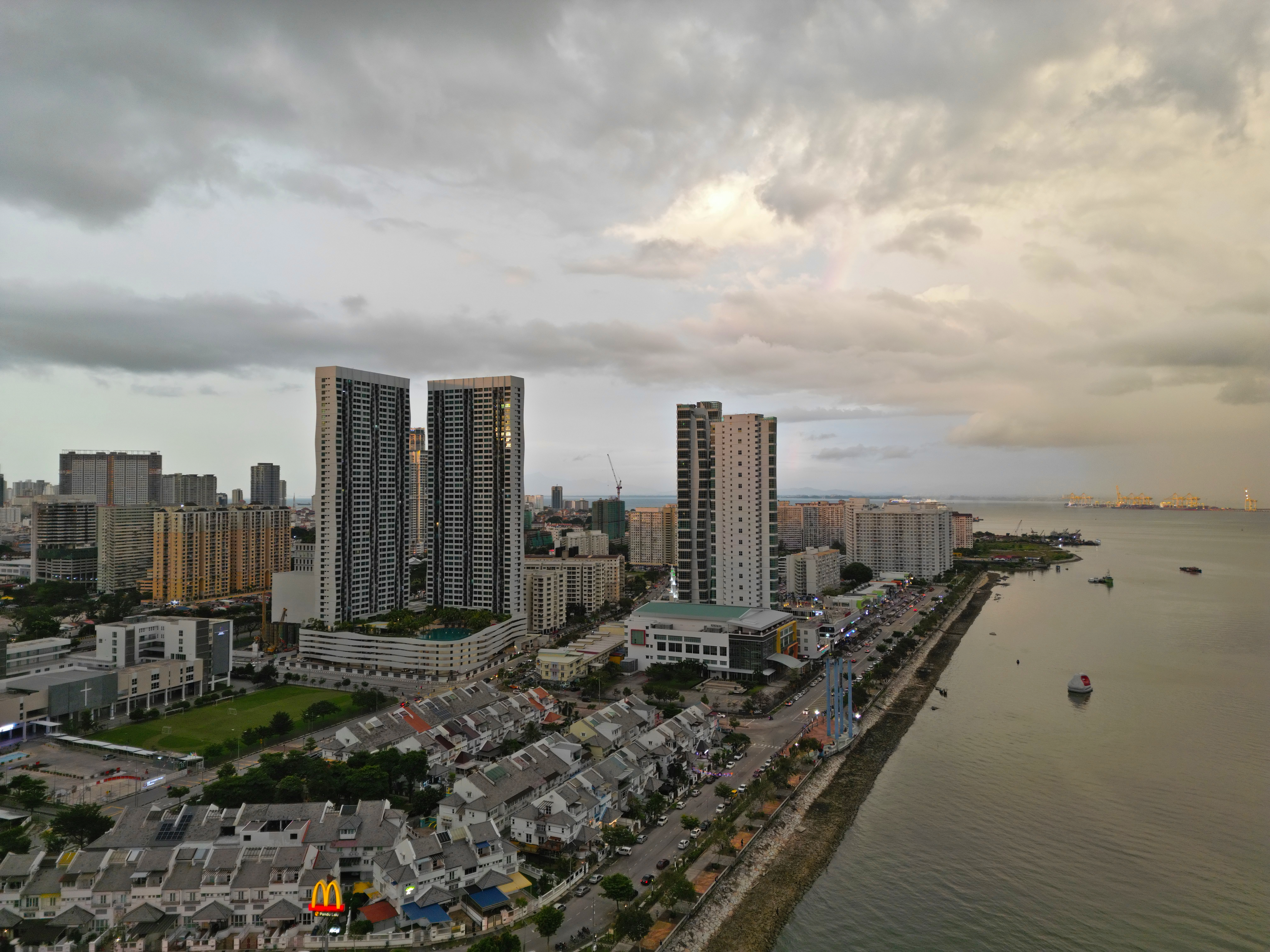
Karpal Singh Drive at dusk

In 1997, Jelutong Development Sdn Bhd (JDSB), a subsidiary of IJM Corporation, was awarded the Jelutong Expressway project – which has since been renamed the Tun Dr Lim Chong Eu Expressway. The highway was intended to serve as the main thoroughfare connecting the city centre and the Penang Bridge, thus alleviating traffic congestion at Jelutong.

The expressway project was estimated to cost RM300 million in total. Due to a lack of funds, the Penang state government ultimately opted to compensate the appointed developer with real estate developments surrounding the thoroughfare, in order to avoid the imposition of toll charges on local motorists. In exchange for the expressway, JDSB was granted exclusive development rights for 368 acres (149 ha) of adjacent land, much of which would be reclaimed from the Penang Strait. The real estate developments were expected to span 15 years, but residential developments took on greater urgency after the repeal of the Rent Control Act that caused a shortage of affordable housing within the city centre.

The 86-acre (35 ha) Bandar Sri Pinang township encompassed the northernmost land parcels B2, C1, C2 and C3. Land reclamation began in 2000 and took seven years to complete. Residential, commercial and industrial developments subsequently commenced, and the new township was ready by 2014. In the same year, the township's coastal promenade was renamed Karpal Singh Drive, following the sudden demise of local-born Democratic Action Party politician Karpal Singh.

== Transportation ==
In 2024, the Bandar Sri Pinang station was announced as the first station of the Mutiara LRT line to be built. Construction commenced in January 2025 and is expected to be completed by 2031, in line with the completion of the Mutiara line.

== Education ==
In 2018, the Methodist Church in Malaysia opened the Wesley Methodist School Penang (International) at the neighbourhood. The school is associated with Methodist College Kuala Lumpur and provides education based on the Cambridge International curriculum.

== See also ==
- The Light Waterfront
- Tanjong Pinang
