= The Light Waterfront =

- Neighbourhood of George Town
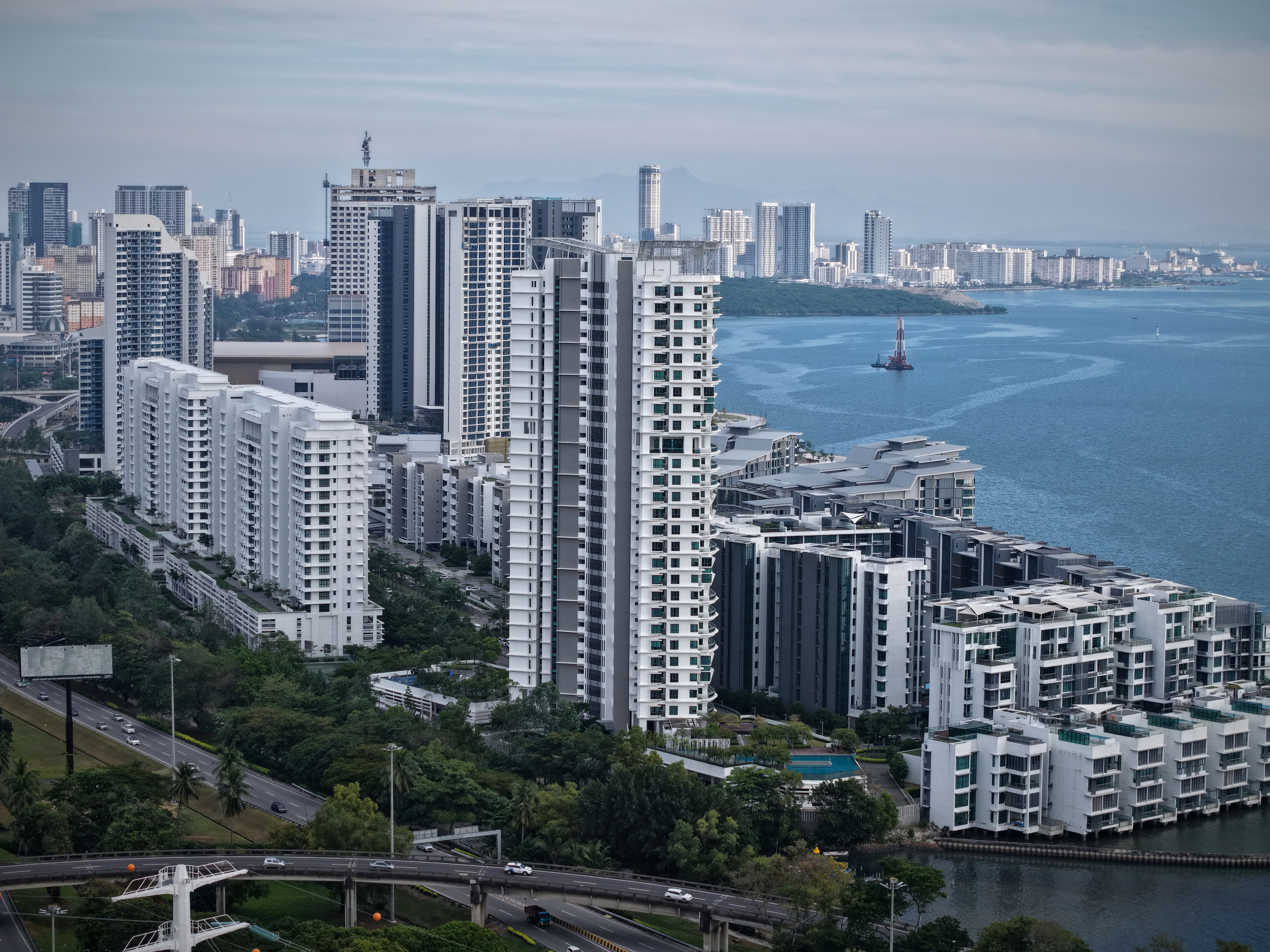

- Location within George Town in Penang
- Coordinates: 5°21′57.8514″N 100°18′56.34″E
- Country: Malaysia
- State: Penang
- City: George Town
- District: Northeast
- Time zone: UTC+8 (MST)
  - Summer (DST): Not observed
- Postal code: 11700

The Light Waterfront is a residential neighbourhood within the city of George Town in the Malaysian state of Penang. Situated within the city centre, it encompasses the foreshore north of the Penang Bridge and is bounded by the Tun Dr Lim Chong Eu Expressway to its west. Comprising a mix of residential, commercial and recreational developments, the township is being built through land reclamation by Malaysian conglomerate IJM Corporation.

== History ==
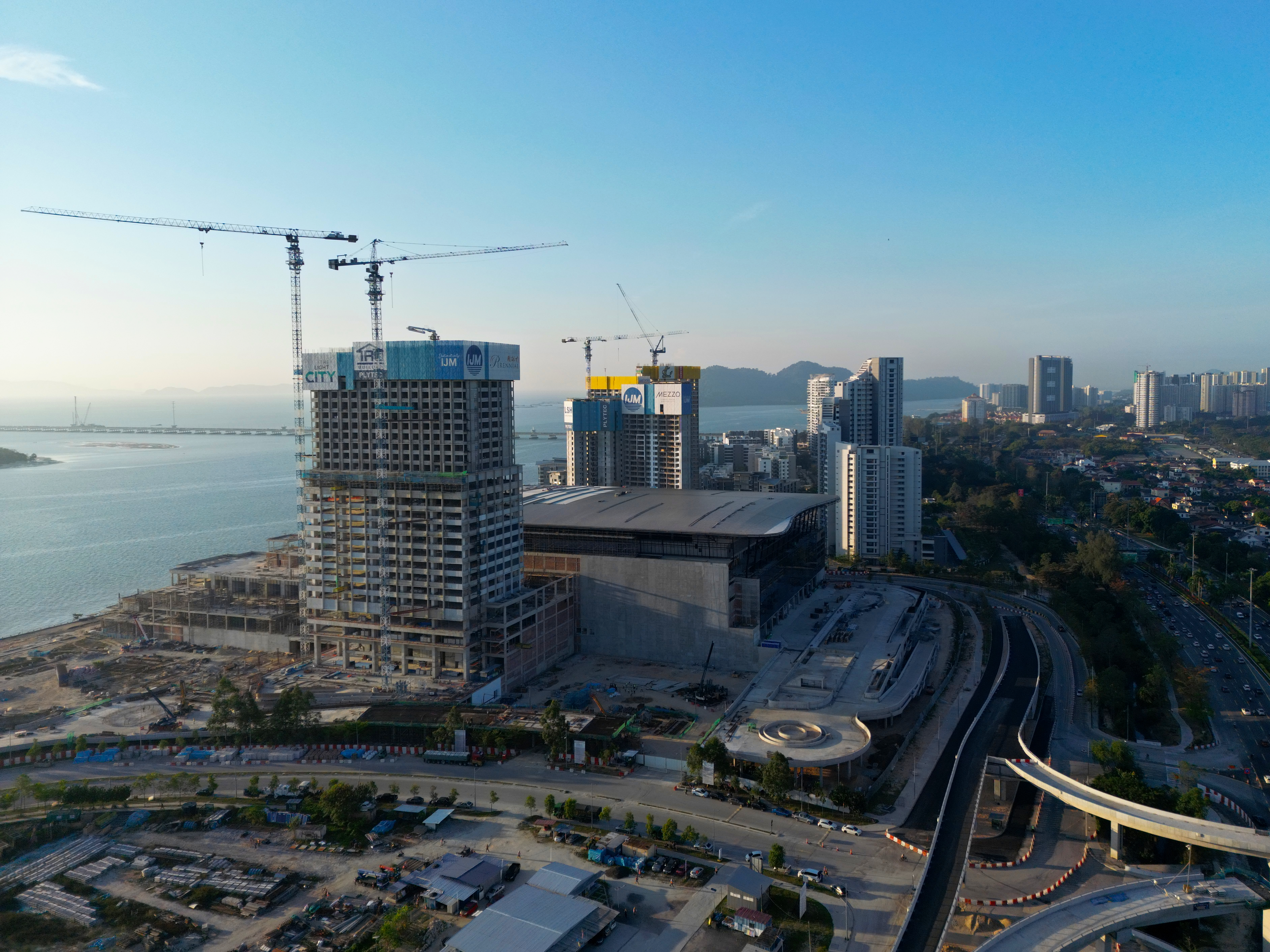
Construction at The Light Waterfront c. 2024

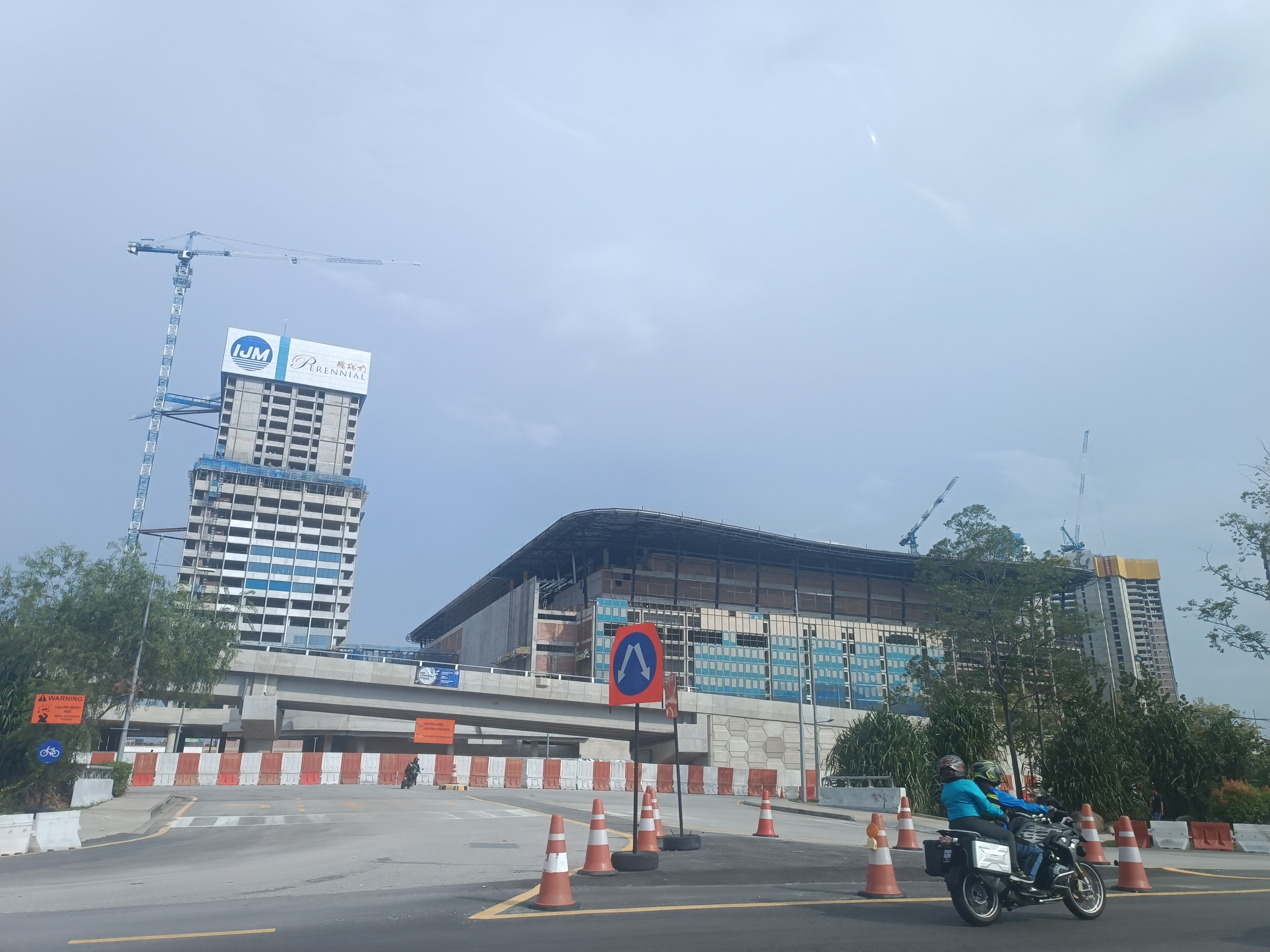
The Penang Waterfront Convention Centre (PWCC) under construction c. 2024

The Waterfront Shoppes in 2026

In 1997, Jelutong Development Sdn Bhd (JDSB), a subsidiary of IJM Corporation, was awarded the Jelutong Expressway project – now known as the Tun Dr Lim Chong Eu Expressway. The highway aimed to reduce traffic congestion at Jelutong by providing a major connection between the city centre and the Penang Bridge.

The estimated cost of the expressway project was RM300 million. Due to insufficient funds, the Penang state government decided to compensate the developer with real estate developments that surrounded the expressway, in order to avoid the imposition of toll charges on local motorists. In exchange for the expressway, JDSB received exclusive rights to develop 368 acres (149 ha) of adjacent land – much of it to be reclaimed from the Penang Strait.

The 154-acre (62 ha) Light Waterfront encompassed the southernmost land parcel A1, which lies between the Green Lane interchange of the expressway and the Penang Bridge. It was unveiled in 2007 as a development masterplan that drew inspiration from the Sentosa Cove development in Singapore. The Light Waterfront masterplan was split into three phases. The first phase comprised residential developments within 42 acres (17 ha) of the southern part of the land reclamation. The second phase – known as 'The Light City' – covered around 103 acres (42 ha), and included hotels, office towers, an RM80 million art gallery, a retail complex called 'The Waterfront Shoppes' and the Penang Waterfront Convention Centre (PWCC). The PWCC is expected to be one of the largest convention centres in Penang, with a gross floor area of 270,000 sq ft (25,000 m^{2}). A seafront park made up the third phase of the masterplan.

The first phase comprising residential components was complete as of 2021. Following a nationwide quarantine during the COVID-19 pandemic, construction of The Light City only commenced in October 2020. The PWCC and The Waterfront Shoppes complex are expected to be completed by 2025, with the Waterfront Shoppes complex opening on October 29, 2026.

== See also ==
- Bandar Sri Pinang
- Tanjong Pinang
