= Kam Suan Pheng =

Kam Suan Pheng 甘钻萍
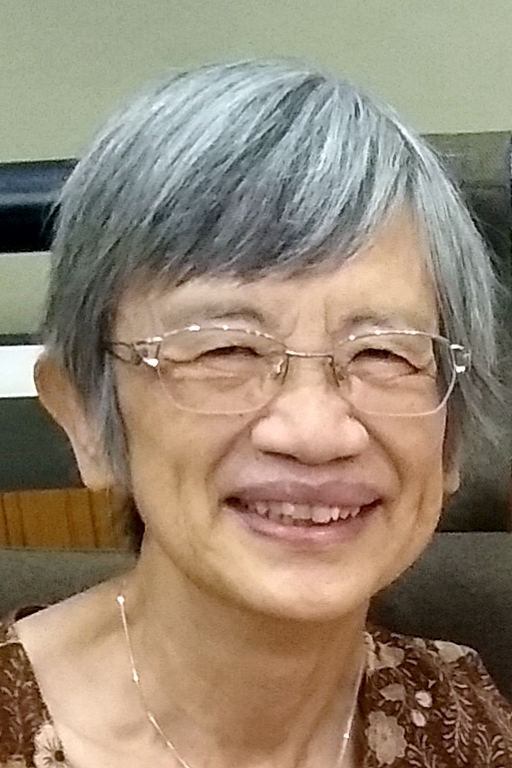
- Dr Kam in 2022
- Occupations: Retired lecturer, soil scientist, geospatial expert and environmentalist
- Years active: 35+
- Known for: Penang Geographic Information System

Kam Suan Pheng (simplified Chinese: 甘钻萍; traditional Chinese: 甘鑽萍) is a retired Malaysian lecturer, soil scientist, geospatial expert and environmentalist. Hailing from the state of Penang, she played an instrumental role in the creation of the Penang Geographic Information System (PeGIS).

== Education ==
In 1975, Kam received her Bachelor of Science degree with first class honours from Universiti Sains Malaysia (USM) where she was recognised as the best all-round student and awarded the Chancellor's Gold Medal for her academic and extra-curricular achievements. She also received the Prof. E. Balasingham Gold Medal for biology and the Datuk Abdul Rahman Yaakub book prize for being the best all-round science student. Kam later pursued a PhD in Agronomy-Soil at Cornell University in Ithaca, New York.

== Career ==
=== Research and teaching ===
While pursuing her degree at USM, Kam served as a teacher at a secondary school at Bukit Mertajam. She became a lecturer and an associate professor at USM from 1981 to 1994, and underwent a certificate course on remote sensing at the Asian Institute of Technology near Bangkok in 1984. She was a visiting faculty at the University of Wisconsin–Madison's Environmental Remote Sensing Center in 1986, and at Imperial College London under the Royal Society Fellowship in 1990. At WorldFish, she served as a senior scientist and took part in the creation of an online ecological and socioeconomic database.

=== Geographic information systems ===
Between 1992 and 1994, Kam and her peers worked with the Penang state government to establish PeGIS. In 2023, she was granted recognition by the state government for her role in spearheading geospatial technology in Penang. She currently oversees urban planning databases for both the Penang Island and Seberang Perai city governments.

In 1994, she provided geographic information system (GIS) and remote sensing support to rice research at the International Rice Research Institute in Manila. Subsequently, between 1996 and 1997, she assisted in employing multitemporal ERS-2 synthetic-aperture radar (SAR) to map the various rice-cropping systems in the Mekong River Delta.

=== Environmental activism ===
Kam was involved in environmental activism in her home state of Penang, helping to establish special interest groups such as the Penang Hills Watch. In 2017, she claimed that the development of hillsides led to soil erosion, contributing to the floods that hit the state that year. She also raised concerns about the state government's ability to ensure compliance by developers in hillside construction guidelines, and pointed out that despite the Penang State Structure Plan 2005-2020 being designed to safeguard highland areas and restrict housing project density, the limits had already been exceeded. Two years later, as the Penang Hills Watch coordinator, Kam insisted on a public inspection of the amended Special Area Plan for the Penang Botanic Gardens, citing concerns about the state's transparency in the conservation of the gardens.
