= City Park, Penang =

Urban park in George Town, Penang, Malaysia

Penang City Park
- Youth Park
- Taman Bandaraya (Malay) 青年公园 (Chinese) பினாங்கு நகராட்சி பூங்கா (Tamil)
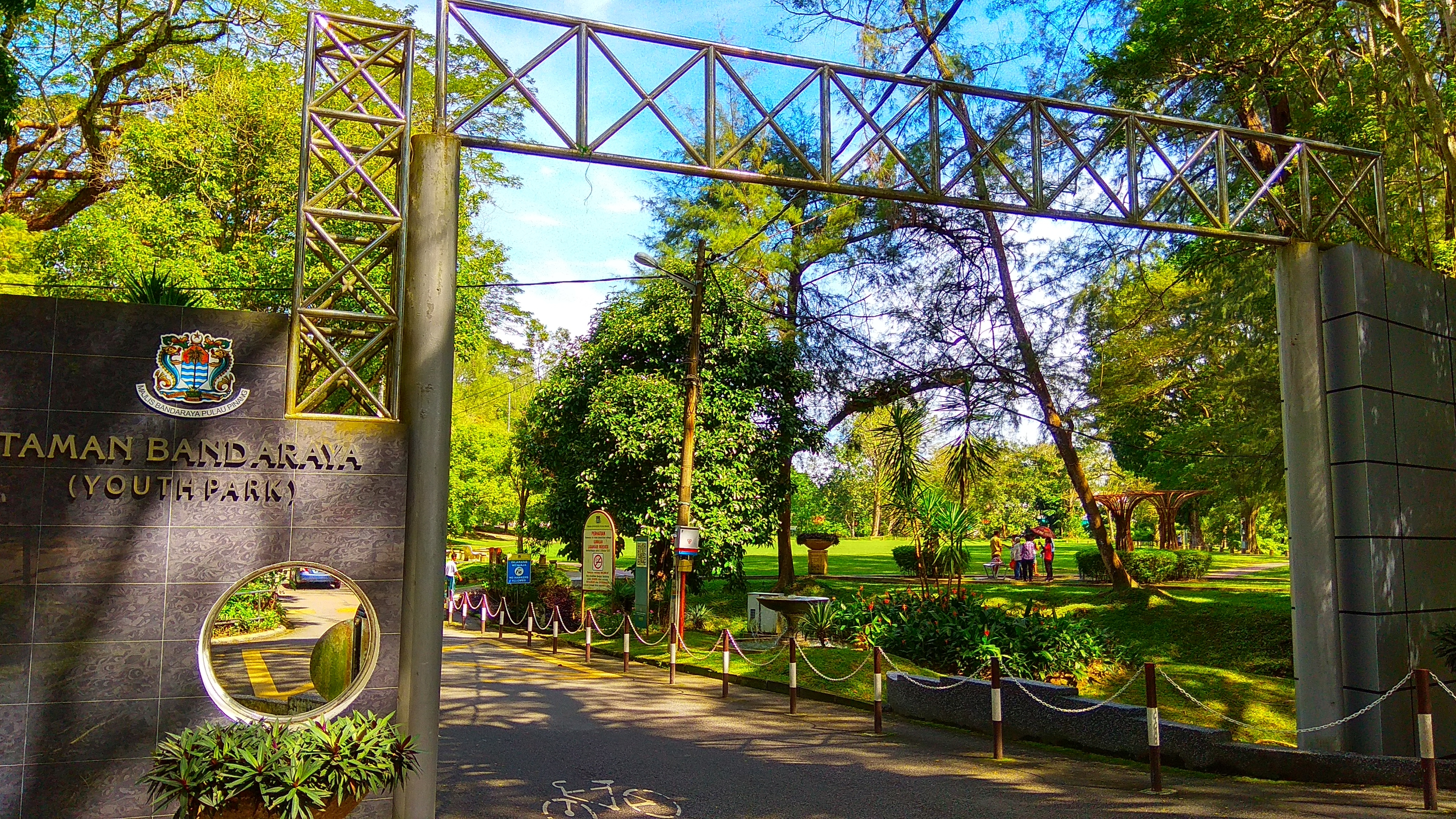
- Interactive map of Penang City Park
- Type: Urban park
- Location: George Town, Penang
- Coordinates: 5°25′45.6528″N 100°17′50.712″E
- Created: 1972
- Operator: Penang Island City Council
- Open: Daily

The City Park, also colloquially known as the Youth Park, is an urban park within the city of George Town in the Malaysian state of Penang. Located near the Penang Botanic Gardens, the City Park was opened in 1972 as a recreational area and a green lung for the city's residents.

True to its name, the City Park contains various recreational amenities, such as playgrounds, a skating rink, swimming pools, a graffiti corner, reflexology paths and an outdoor auditorium, all of which are open to the public. The park is maintained by the Penang Island City Council.

== History ==
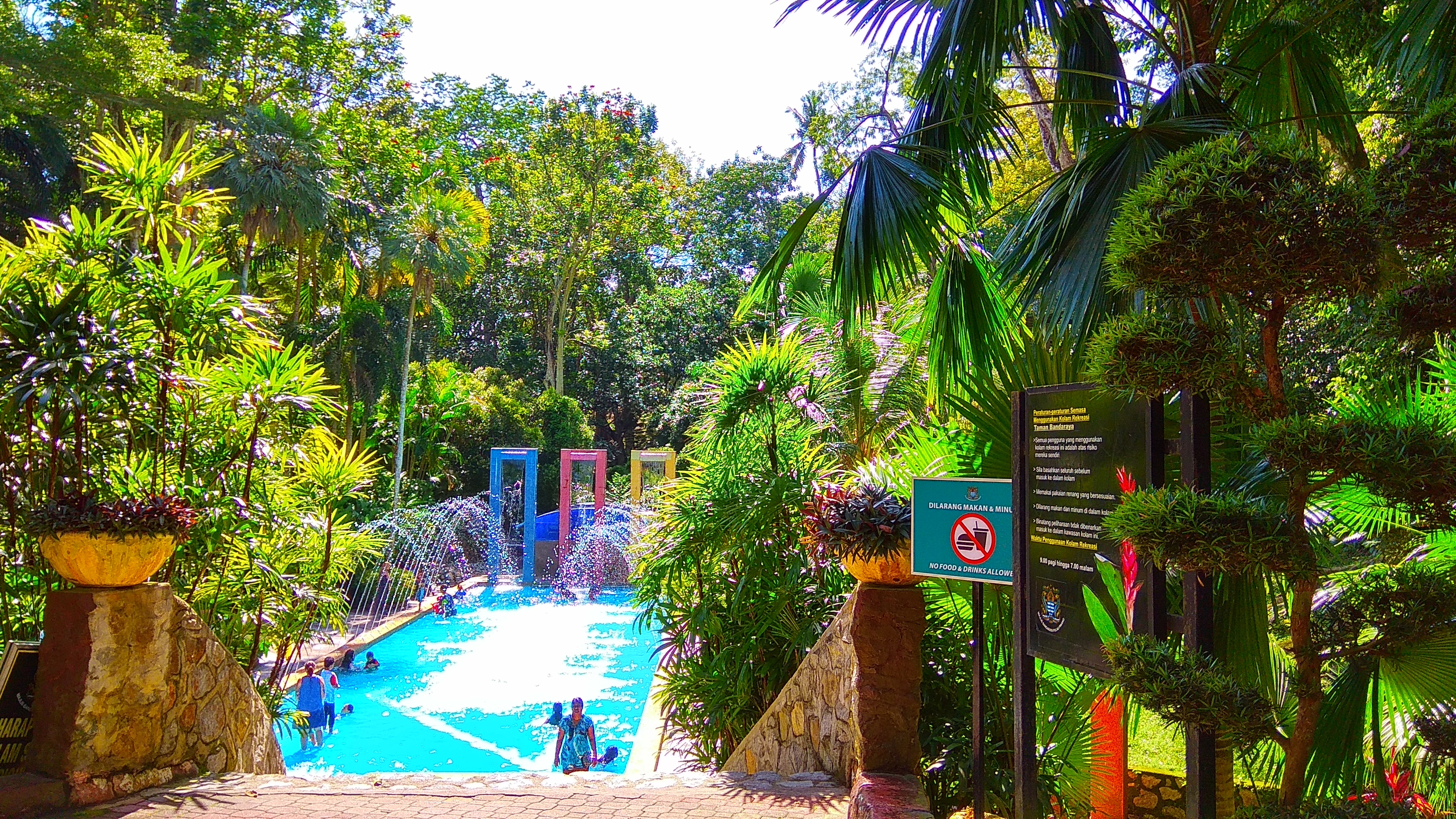
A public pool at the City Park. The water used is sourced from the nearby waterfalls.

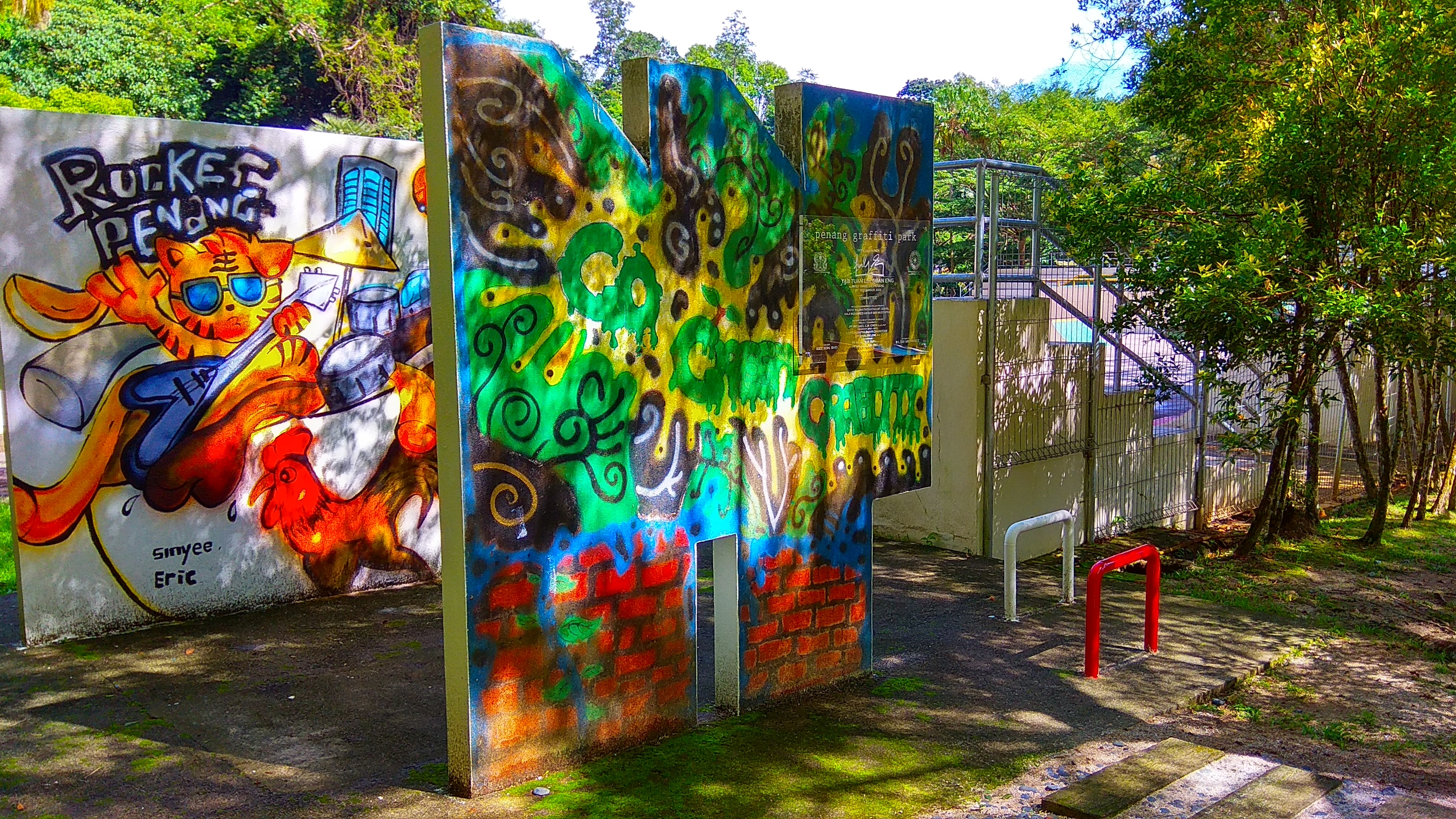
The Penang Graffiti Park was launched in 2012.

The idea for the establishment of a 'Youth Park' came into being in 1970, in response to concerns over juvenile delinquency and a lack of recreational areas. At the time, the area now known as the City Park was an abandoned 40-acre (16-hectare) granite quarry.

A proposal to establish a 'Youth Park' was accepted by Lim Chong Eu, the then Chief Minister of Penang. A committee was subsequently formed to explore the idea and a groundbreaking ceremony was launched late that year. In the aftermath of the 1969 race riots in Kuala Lumpur, it was decided that the park should also embody Penang's multi-cultural heritage in the "community of nature". To that end, volunteers from the various schools and youth clubs within Penang were roped in for the groundbreaking event.

The Youth Park, as it was known at the time, was officially declared open in 1972 by the then Governor of Penang, Syed Hassan Barakbah. At its opening, the park was equipped with an obstacle course, a skating rink and an outdoor auditorium. More facilities were added in the years since, with the latest being the Penang Graffiti Park in 2012.

The City Park is also home to two of the Penang Island City Council departments - the Community Service Department and the Landscape Department. The GBI-rated council office incorporates a rain harvesting system, an outdoor garden and vertical green walls, as well as transparent glass panels designed to allow maximum natural lighting.

== See also ==
- Penang Botanic Gardens
