= The Maritime, Penang =

Mixed-use development in George Town, Penang, Malaysia

The Maritime
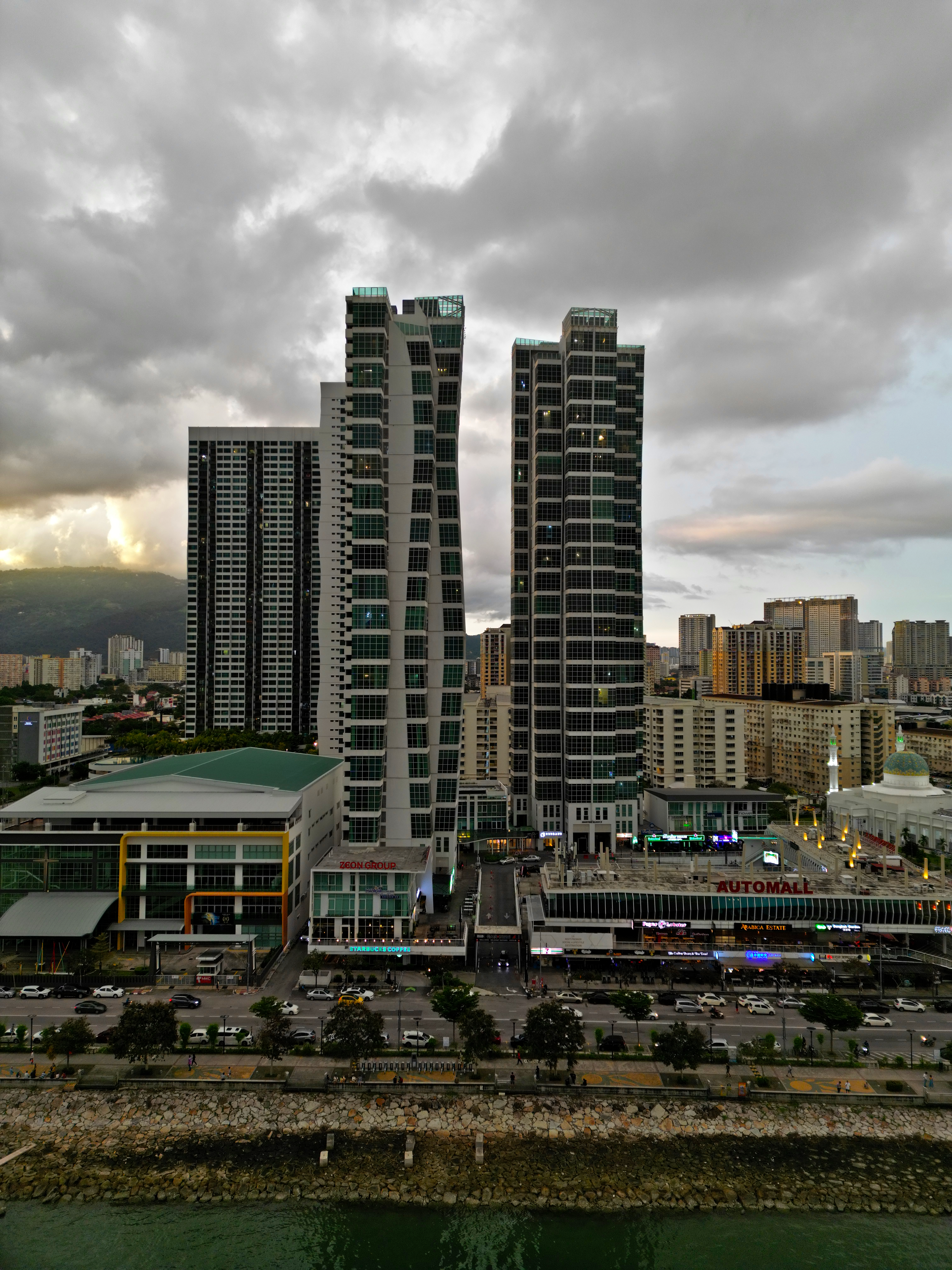

General information
- Type: SOHO
- Location: Karpal Singh Drive, 11600 George Town, Penang, Malaysia, George Town, Penang, Malaysia
- Coordinates: 5.397983°N 100.329833°E
- Owner: IJM Corporation

Height
- Roof: A: 139 m (456 ft); B: 158 m (518 ft)
- Top floor: A: 36; B: 40

Technical details
- Floor count: A: 36; B: 40

The Maritime is a mixed-use development complex within George Town in the Malaysian state of Penang. Located at Karpal Singh Drive, it consists of two residential skyscrapers collectively named The Maritime Suites, and The Maritime Piazza, the retail component of the mixed development. The Maritime Suites consist of Suites A and B, which contains 36 and 40 floors of SOHO suites respectively.

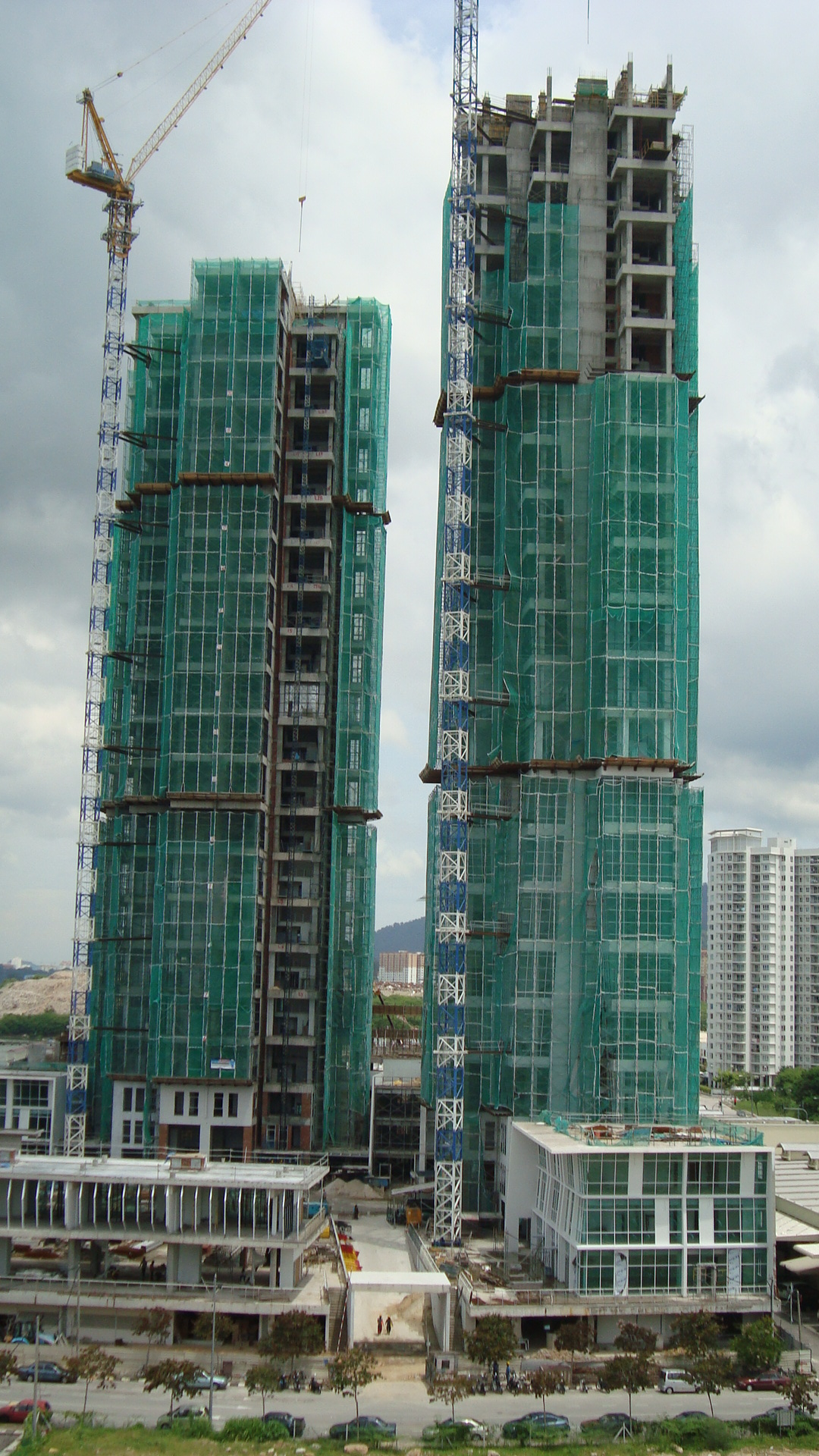
Construction of The Maritime Suites in 2013

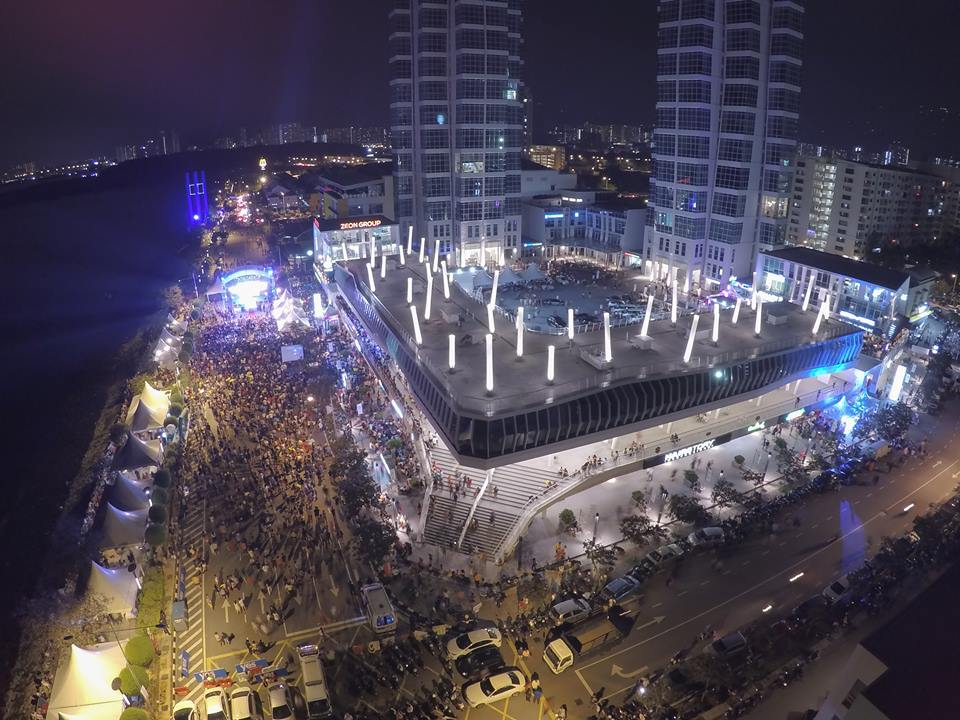
Diwali festivities at The Maritime Piazza

Built by IJM Corporation, a Malaysian property conglomerate, The Maritime formed part of the development of the IJM Promenade, which was subsequently renamed after Karpal Singh, a former local DAP politician,

== See also ==
- List of tallest buildings in George Town
- Karpal Singh Drive
