= RCSI and UCD Malaysia Campus =

Private university in George Town, Penang, Malaysia

Coordinates: 5.4199°N 100.3070°E

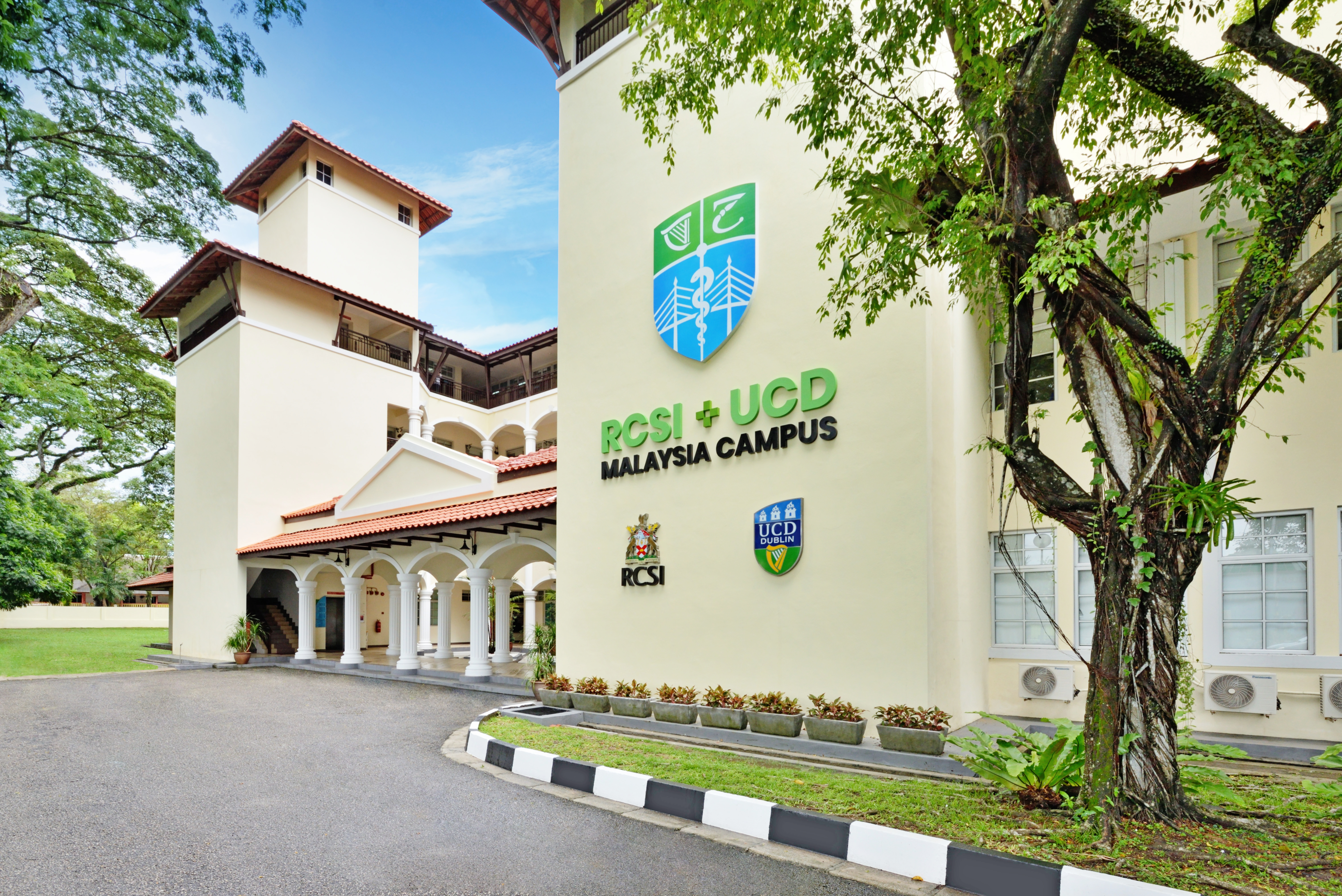
- RUMC academic building
- Former name: Penang Medical College
- Established: 1996
- President: Karen Morgan
- Dean: Dato' Abdul Rashid Khan
- Location: Georgetown, Penang, Malaysia
- Website: rumc.edu.my

The RCSI and UCD Malaysia Campus (RUMC) is a private medical school in George Town, Penang, Malaysia. It was established in 1996 as Penang Medical College. It is an international branch campus of the Royal College of Surgeons in Ireland and University College Dublin.

RUMC's undergraduate medicine programme is delivered in Ireland and Malaysia. It includes pre-clinical training of 2.5 years at either RCSI or UCD in Dublin, Ireland, followed by clinical training of 2.5 years in Penang where students undergo clinical rotations at Hospital Pulau Pinang, Hospital Seberang Jaya, Hospital Bukit Mertajam, and Hospital Taiping. The medical degree programme has one intake per year (every September).

RUMC also offers a Foundation in Science (FIS) programme, a pre-university pathway to medicine with an intake every June. RUMC has graduated over 2,100 doctors. It is a coordinating site for Cochrane in Malaysia.

RUMC's president and CEO is Professor Karen Morgan.

== Academic programmes ==
=== Undergraduate Medicine (MB BCh BAO) ===
RUMC's flagship programme is the undergraduate medical degree. The intake for the programme is done every September. The transnational programme allows students to study in Dublin, Ireland and Penang, Malaysia. The degree is conferred by the National University of Ireland (NUI).

=== Pre-university programmes ===
RUMC offers a Foundation in Science (FIS) programme, a pre-university pathway to medicine with an intake every May/June. The programme is conducted in RUMC's campus in Penang, Malaysia for a duration of one year.

=== Other programmes ===
RUMC also hosts the Malaysia-Ireland Training Programme for Family Medicine (MInTFM), a specialty training for Family Medicine in collaboration with the Irish College of General Practitioners (ICGP). The 4-year training programme is open to both permanent and contract Medical Officers employed under the Ministry of Health, Malaysia.
