= Karpal Singh Drive =

Road in the Malaysian state of Penang

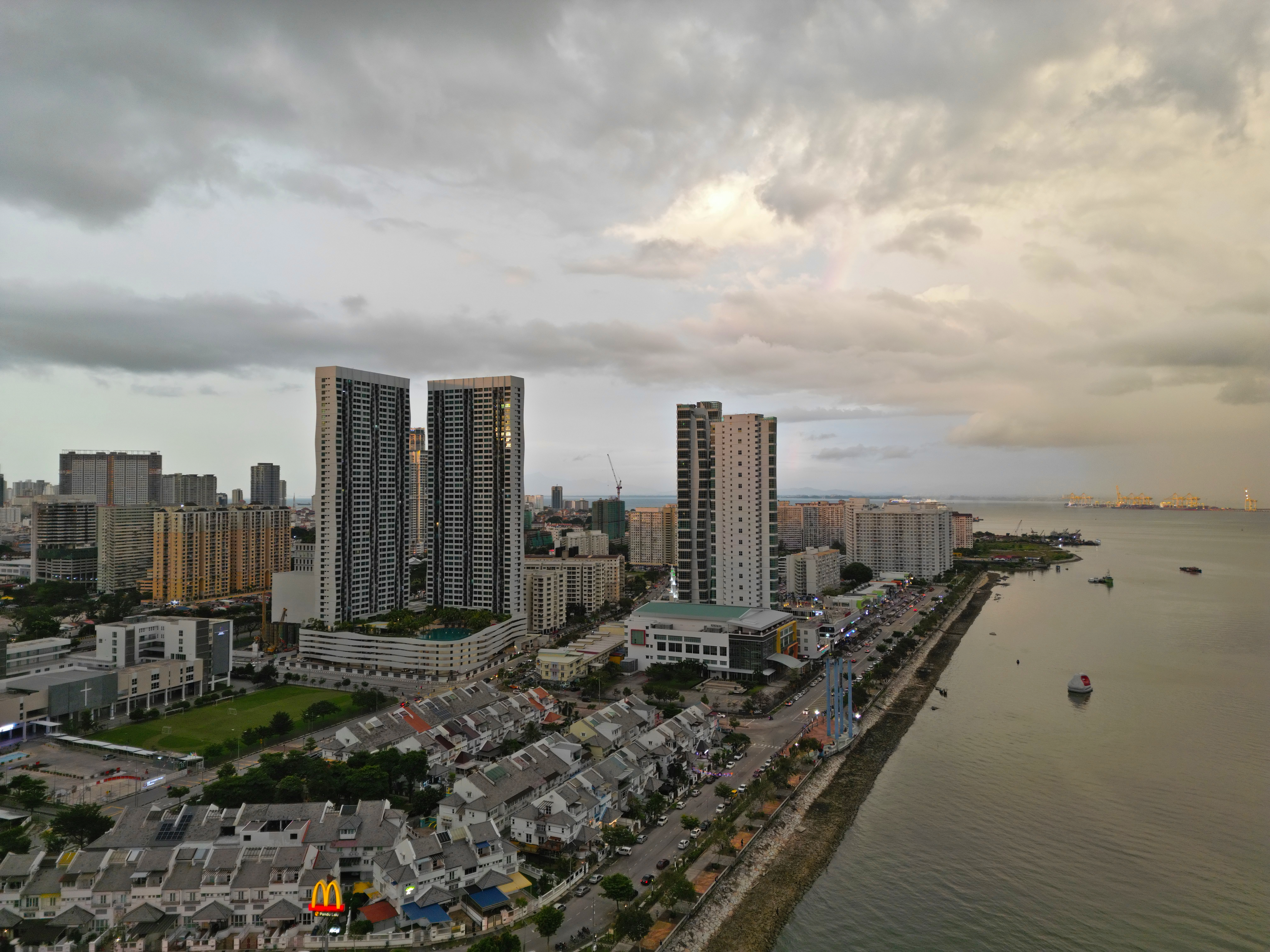
- Interactive map of Karpal Singh Drive
- Native name: Malay: Persiaran Karpal Singh; Chinese: 卡巴星道; Tamil: கர்பால் சிங் சுற்றுலா வீதி
- Maintained by: Penang Island City Council
- Length: 0.8 km (0.50 mi)
- Location: George Town
- Coordinates: 5.398143°N 100.330253°E

Construction
- Inauguration: 2014
- PERSIARAN KARPAL SINGH 1 LEBUH SUNGAI PINANG 411600 P. PINANG

Karpal Singh Drive is a seafront promenade in George Town within the Malaysian state of Penang. Located at Bandar Sri Pinang, it faces the Penang Strait and was named after Karpal Singh (1940-2014), a prominent opposition politician and lawyer who hailed from the city.

Along Karpal Singh Drive are upscale residential and commercial properties, while the paved promenade itself is decorated with a handful of art sculptures.

== Etymology ==
The promenade was renamed after the late Karpal Singh, a Penangite lawyer who rose to prominence in the Democratic Action Party (DAP). He was once nicknamed the 'Tiger of Jelutong' as he held the federal seat of Jelutong for five consecutive terms. At the time of death in 2014, he was the Member of Parliament for the Bukit Gelugor.

After Karpal Singh's death, the then Chief Minister of Penang, Lim Guan Eng, announced that the seaside promenade would be renamed in honour of his departed colleague and presented a map of the road with its new name to the former's widow, Gurmit Kaur. The renaming of the promenade made Karpal Singh the first local DAP politician to be honoured with a street name within George Town.

Prior to the renaming move, the road was known colloquially as the 'Seaview' or the IJM Promenade, the latter after the developer that built this particular neighbourhood.

== Landmarks ==
Karpal Singh Drive features a 10 metre paved walkway beautified with modern art sculptures by Hitori Nakayama, a Japanese artist who has been residing in Penang. These include the 'Celebration of Our Blue Sky' and the 'Rhythm of Light'; the former consists of a set of four blue pillars whilst the latter depicts musical notes.

The Maritime is a commercial complex at Karpal Singh Drive, consisting of a two-storey commercial podium known as The Maritime Piazza and two high rise office blocks called The Maritime Suites. The Maritime Piazza contains the Auto Mall, which is made up of car showrooms, eateries, cafes and entertainment outlets.

== Gallery ==
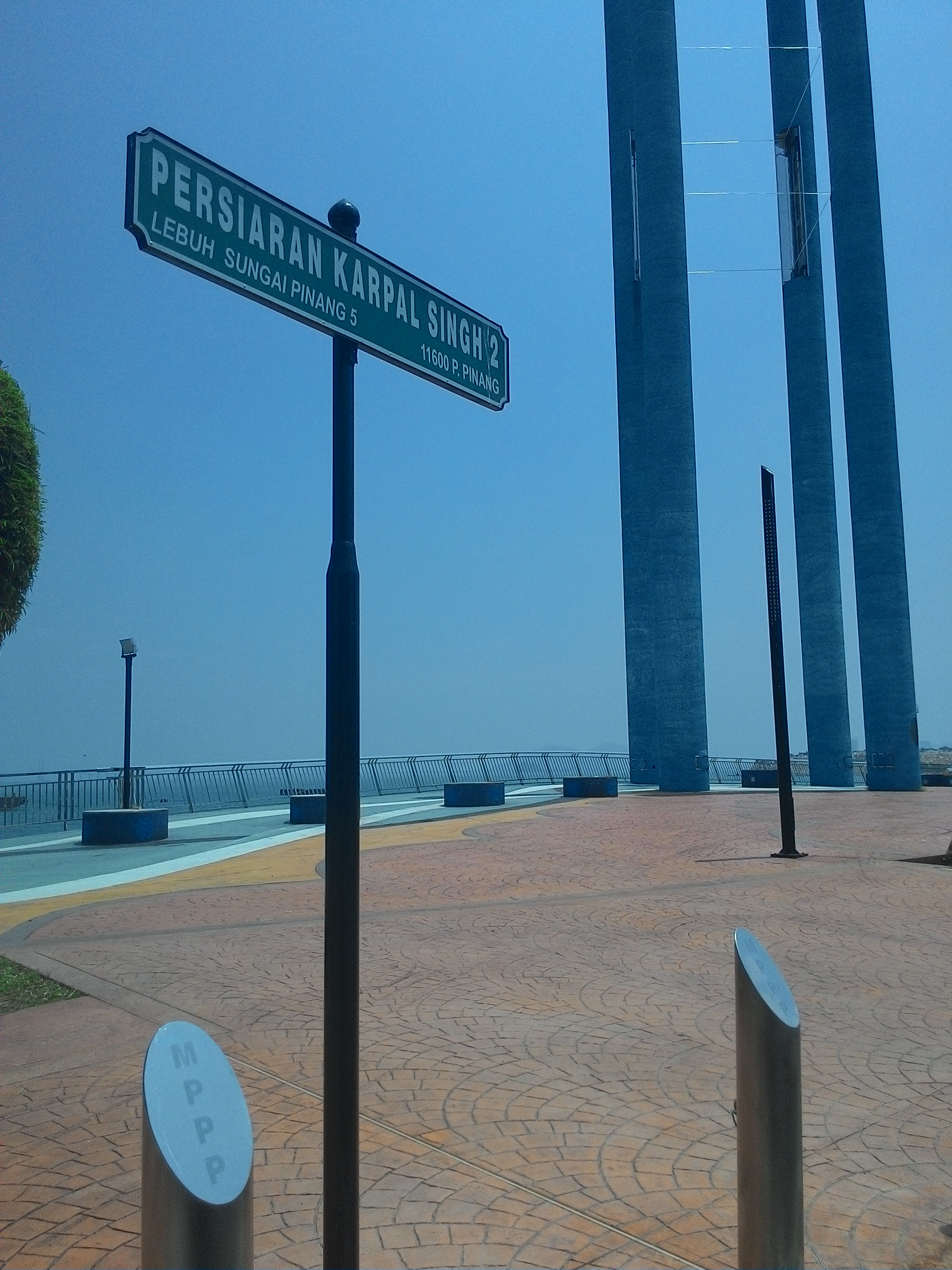
A road sign at Karpal Singh Drive, with the Celebration of Our Blue Sky installation in the background.

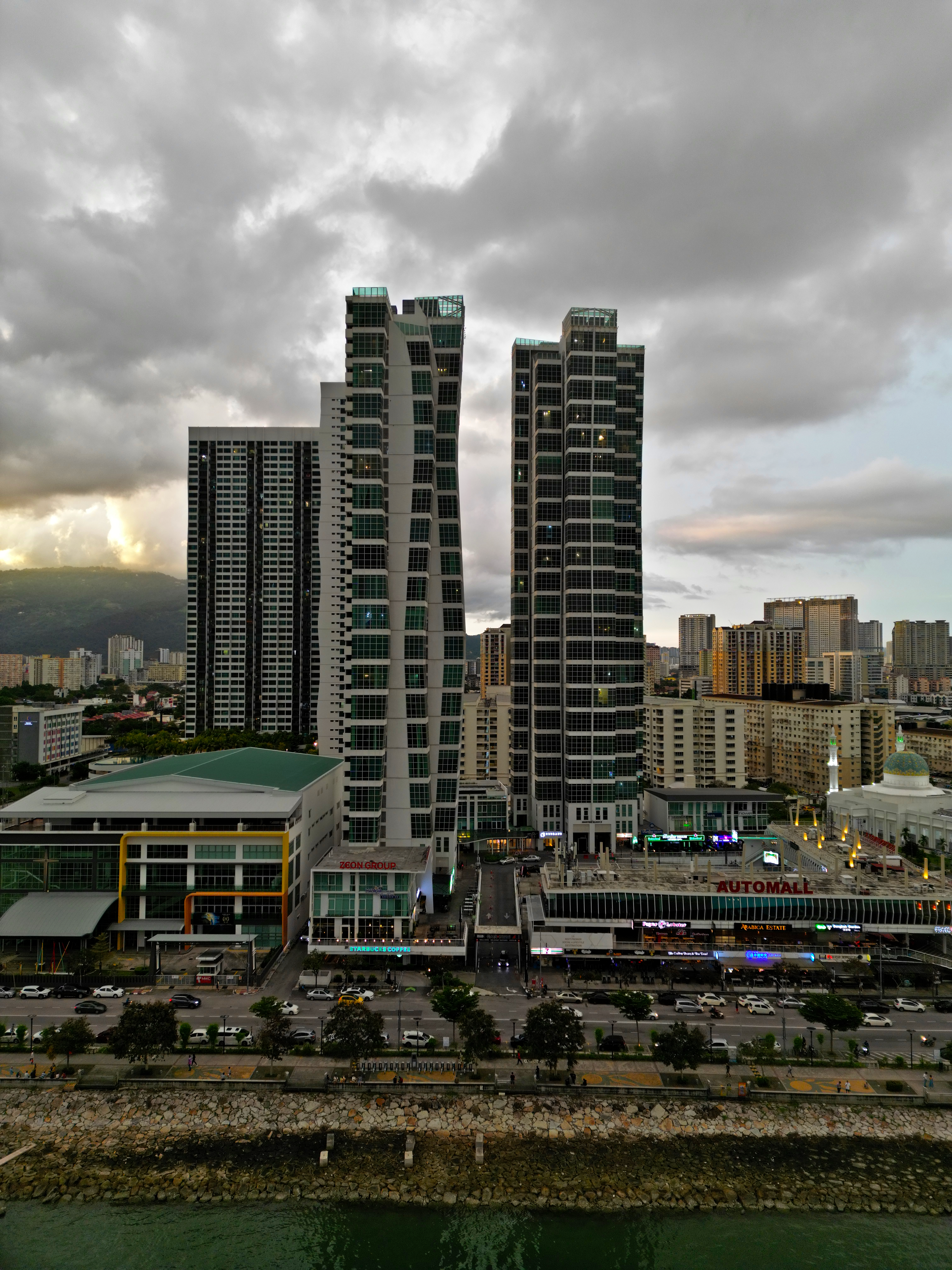
The Maritime is a major lifestyle hub along the street, housing numerous eateries and entertainment outlets.

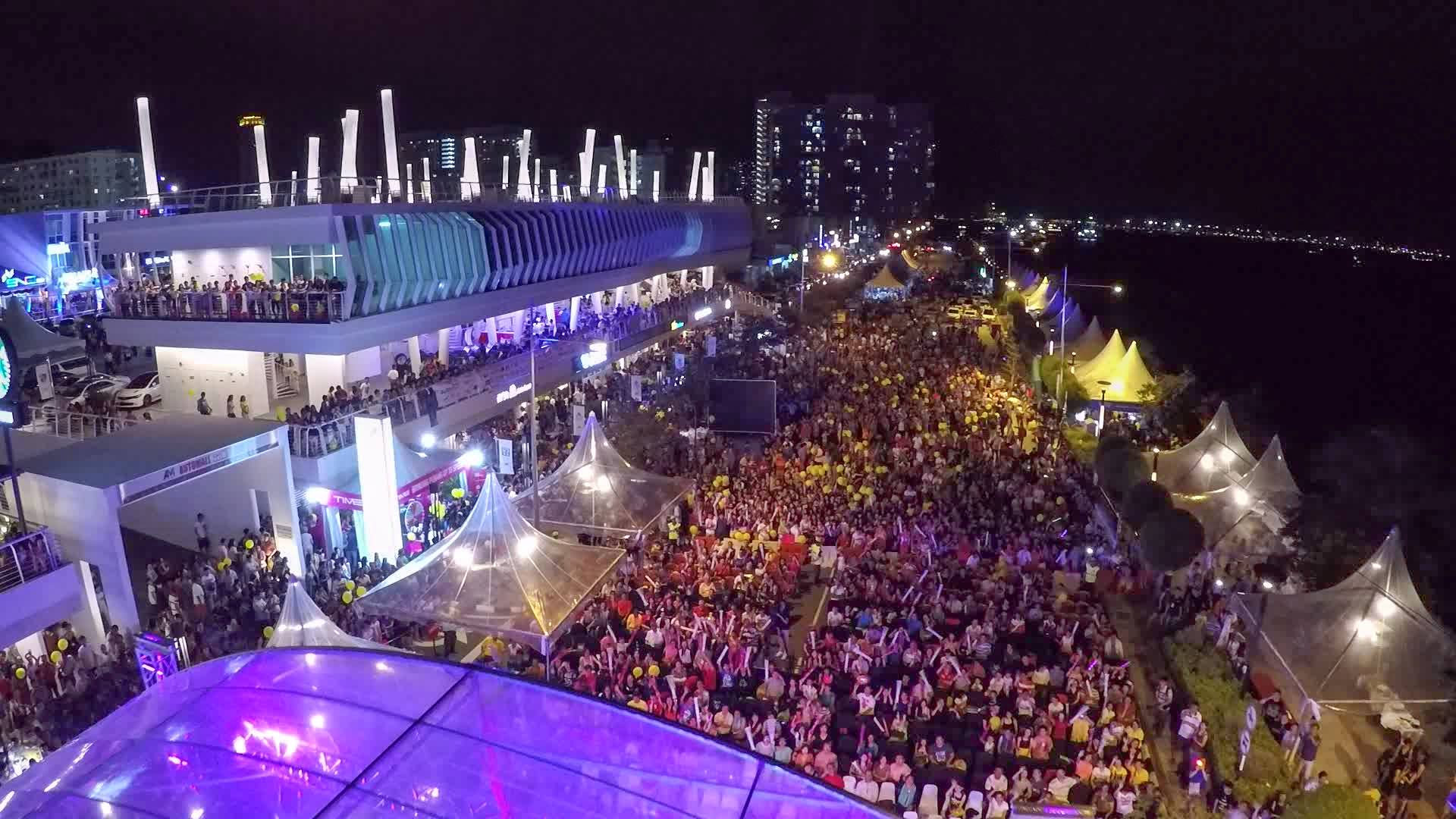
Karpal Singh Drive at night
