= IJM Corporation =

Infrastructure company in Malaysia

IJM Corporation Berhad
- Company type: Public
- Traded as: MYX: 3336
- ISIN: MYL3336OO004
- Industry: Construction; Property; Infrastructure; Plantations; Industry
- Founded: 1983; 43 years ago
- Founders: Yap Lim Sen; Koon Yew Yin; Koh Boon Chor
- Key people: Tan Boon Seng @ Krishnan (Chairman); Lee Chun Fai (CEO & MD)
- Revenue: ▼RM5.13 billion (2016)
- Net income: ▲RM793.6 million
- Website: ijm.com

IJM Corporation Berhad (MYX: 3336) is one of Malaysia's leading conglomerates and is listed on the Main Market of Bursa Malaysia Securities Berhad ("Bursa Securities"). Its core business activities encompass construction, property development, manufacturing and quarrying and Infrastructure concessions. Headquartered in Selangor, Malaysia, IJM's regional aspirations have seen it establish a growing presence in neighbouring developing markets with operations presently spanning 10 countries, with primary focus in Malaysia, Singapore, Australia, United Arab Emirates, China, Indonesia and India.

== Corporate Profile ==
The result of a merger between three medium-sized local construction companies – IGB Construction Sdn. Bhd. (Ipoh Garden Bhd.), Jurutama Sdn Bhd and Mudajaya Sdn Bhd, IJM was formed in 1983.

In April 2007, IJM acquired the Road Builder Group ("RBH"), its nearest competitor, to augment its position as one of the country's biggest builders. In addition to bolstering its construction order book, property land bank and infrastructure portfolio, the enlarged Group enabled IJM to attain considerable synergistic benefits, greater local prominence as well as attain a more sizeable balance sheet to bid for larger jobs and facilitate its expansion into overseas markets.

IJM Land Berhad is one of the largest property developers in Malaysia with townships, commercial buildings and high-rise condominiums under development in key growth areas throughout the country. IJM has also undertaken ventures overseas in the past such as in Orlando USA, Singapore and Australia.

Initially supporting in-house needs, the Group's Industry Division quickly grew its operations into scale-able core activities focused on catering to demand from outside the Group. IJM continued to expand on its operations in this division with strategic acquisitions such as the takeover of Industrial Concrete Products Berhad in 2004 and market diversifications into China, India and Pakistan.

Amongst the Group's present investments in major overseas infrastructure projects are the Western Access Tollway in Argentina, five tolled highways and the Gautami power plant in India, and the Binh An water treatment concession in Vietnam. In Malaysia, the Group owns and operates three highways and port concessions from the RBH merger. The Group had previously invested in and sold several infrastructure assets in China.

The Group also ventured into oil palm plantations in 1985 as a source of steady income to cushion the cyclical nature of its core construction business. It is currently expanding its plantation operations into Indonesia.

When IJM went public in 1986, it had a market capitalisation of RM66 million and total assets of RM172 million. The Group's market capitalisation stood at RM9.83 billion as of 30 June 2014 and total assets stood at RM18.4 billion as of 31 March 2014.

In January 2026, Sunway Group launched a roughly RM11 billion (US$2.7 billion) conditional takeover offer for IJM in a cash-and-stock deal, mostly payable in new Sunway shares. The IJM board, advised by an independent adviser, urged shareholders to reject the bid citing that it undervalued the company.

== Company history ==
I → IGB Construction Sdn Bhd was incorporated in 1981

J → Jurutama Sdn Bhd was incorporated in 1970 as Soon Tat Construction Sdn Bhd

M → Mudajaya Construction Sdn Bhd was incorporated in 1965 as Chye Hin Construction Co Ltd. In 1997, the name was changed to Mudajaya Corporation Berhad (a construction company of Mudajaya Group Berhad)

In 1982, in a friendly takeover, IGB Corporation Bhd acquired all the shares in Jurutama and Mudajaya. Following this acquisition, Solidstate Sdn Bhd was incorporated (1983) and, in 1984, the name was changed to IJM Engineering and Construction Sdn Bhd. IGB then transferred all its equity interests in Jurutama and Mudajaya together with that of IGB Construction in exchange for shares in this newly incorporated company. IJM had thus become IGB's holding company for its construction interests. In 1986, IJM turned public. An application made for its shares to be listed on the Bursa Malaysia Securities Berhad was subsequently obtained in September 1986.

To better reflect the Group's diversified nature of activities, the present logo and a new name, IJM Corporation Berhad, was adopted in 1989.

== Subsidiaries ==
=== Construction ===
- IJM Construction Sdn Bhd
- Road Builder (M) Sdn Bhd
- Jurutama Sdn Bhd
- Commerce House Sdn Bhd
- GR Commerce Sdn Bhd
- IJM (India) Geotechniques Private Limited
- IJM (India) Infrastructure Limited
- IJM Building Systems Sdn Bhd
- IJM Construction (Middle East) Limited Liability Company
- IJM Construction International Limited Liability Company
- Insitu Envirotech (M) Sdn Bhd
- Insitu Envirotech (S.E. Asia) Pte Ltd
- Insitu Envirotech Pte Ltd
- Nilai Cipta Sdn Bhd
- Prebore Piling & Engineering Sdn Bhd

=== Properties ===
- IJM Land Berhad
- IJM Properties Sdn Bhd
- IJM RE Sdn Bhd
- Aqua Aspect Sdn Bhd
- Aras Varia Sdn Bhd
- Bukit Bendera Resort Sdn Bhd
- Casa Warna Sdn Bhd
- Chen Yu Land Sdn Bhd
- Delta Awana Sdn Bhd
- Dian Warna Sdn Bhd
- Emko Management Services Sdn Bhd
- Emko Properties Sdn Bhd
- ERMS Berhad
- IJM Australia Pty Limited
- IJM Lingamaneni Township Private Limited
- IJM Management Services Sdn Bhd
- Liberty Heritage (M) Sdn Bhd
- Manda’rina (M) Sdn Bhd
- NPE Property Development Sdn Bhd
- NS Central Market Sdn Bhd
- Pilihan Alam Jaya Sdn Bhd
- RB Development Sdn Bhd
- RB Land Sdn Bhd
- RB Property Management Sdn Bhd
- Seremban Two Holdings Sdn Bhd
- Seremban Two Landscape Sdn Bhd
- Seremban Two Properties Sdn Bhd
- Seremban Two Property Management Sdn Bhd
- Serenity Ace Sdn Bhd
- Shah Alam 2 Sdn Bhd
- Sinaran Intisari (M) Sdn Bhd
- Suria Bistari Development Sdn Bhd
- Swarnandhra-IJMII Integrated Township Development Company Private Limited
- Titian Tegas Sdn Bhd
- Unggul Senja Sdn Bhd
- Worldwide Ventures Sdn Bhd

=== Industries ===
- Industrial Concrete Products Sdn Bhd
- Malaysian Rock Products Sdn Bhd
- Aggregate Marketing Sdn Bhd
- Azam Ekuiti Sdn Bhd
- Concrete Mould Engineering Sdn Bhd
- Durabon Sdn Bhd
- Expedient Resources Sdn Bhd
- Global Rock Marketing Sdn Bhd
- ICP Investment (L) Limited
- ICP Jiangmen Co. Ltd
- ICP Marketing Sdn Bhd
- ICPB (Mauritius) Limited
- IJM Concrete Products Pakistan (Private) Ltd
- IJM Concrete Products Private Limited
- Kamad Quarry Sdn Bhd
- Kemena Industries Sdn Bhd
- Kuang Rock Products Sdn Bhd
- Oriental Empire Sdn Bhd
- Scaffold Master Sdn Bhd
- Strong Mixed Concrete Sdn Bhd
- Tadmansori Rubber Industries Sdn Bhd
- Ubon Steel Sdn Bhd

=== Plantations ===
- IJM Plantations Berhad
- Akrab Perkasa Sdn Bhd
- Ampas Maju Sdn Bhd
- Berakan Maju Sdn Bhd
- Desa Talisai Palm Oil Mill Sdn Bhd
- Desa Talisai Sdn Bhd
- Cahaya Adil Sdn Bhd
- Firdana Corporation Sdn Bhd
- Gerbang Selasih Sdn Bhd
- Excellent Challenger (M) Sdn Bhd
- Gapas Mewah Sdn Bhd
- Golden Grip Sdn Bhd
- Gunaria Sdn Bhd
- IJM Agri Services Sdn Bhd
- IJM Edible Oils Sdn Bhd
- Kulim Mewah Sdn Bhd
- Laserline Sdn Bhd
- Minat Teguh Sdn Bhd
- Rakanan Jaya Sdn Bhd
- Rantajasa Sdn Bhd
- Ratus Sempurna Sdn Bhd
- RB Plantations Sdn Bhd
- Sabang Mills Sdn Bhd
- Sijas Plantations Sdn Bhd
- Sri Kilau Sdn Bhd

=== Infrastructure ===
==== Toll operators ====
- Besraya Sdn Bhd ( Sungai Besi Expressway Sungai Besi Expressway)
- New Pantai Expressway Sdn Bhd ( New Pantai Expressway New Pantai Expressway)
- Lebuhraya Kajang-Seremban Sdn Bhd ( Kajang–Seremban Highway Kajang–Seremban Highway)
- Jaipur – Mahua Tollway Private Limited
- RB Highway Services Sdn Bhd
- Rewa Tollway Private Limited
- Roadstar (India) Infrastructure Private Limited
- Sukma Samudra Sdn Bhd
- Swarnandhra Road Care Private Limited

==== Port operators ====
- Konsortium Pelabuhan Kemaman Sdn Bhd (Kemaman Port)
- Kuantan Port Consortium Sdn Bhd (Kuantan Port)
- KP Port Services Sdn Bhd

==== Others ====
- Essmarine Terminal Sdn Bhd
- IEMCEE Infra (Mauritius) Limited
- IJM International Limited
- IJM Investments (L) Ltd
- IJM Investments (M) Limited
- IJM Overseas Ventures Sdn Bhd
- IJM Rajasthan (Mauritius) Limited
- IJM Rewa (Mauritius) Limited
- IJM Trichy (Mauritius) Limited
- IJMII (Mauritius) Limited
