= Sri Aruloli Thirumurugan temple =

Coordinates: 5°25′31″N 100°16′06″E

Sri Aruloli Thirumurugan Temple

Religion
- Affiliation: Hinduism
- Deity: Murugan

Location
- Location: Penang Hill, Penang, Malaysia

Sri Aruloli Thirumurugan Temple is a Hindu temple located on Penang Hill in Penang, Malaysia. It is dedicated to the Hindu deity Murugan.

== History ==
The temple originated in the 19th century, when South Indian labourers, sepoys, and sedan-chair carriers working on Penang Hill established a place of worship on Gun Hill (historically known as Flagstaff Hill or Bel Retiro). Local historical literature and oral tradition describe the discovery of a Vel (divine spear) during the clearing of the site, after which it became the focal point of worship.

In 1956, a small shrine was built to house the icon. Following the allocation of state land, a building committee was formed to construct a permanent temple, which underwent its first Kumbhabhishekam (consecration ceremony) in 1971.

=== 1999–2002 reconstruction ===
By the late 1990s, the aging temple required significant structural upgrades. In 1999, the management committee decided to demolish the older temple building to make way for a completely new, larger structure. The project involved bringing skilled sculptors (sthapathis) from India to design and carve the intricate traditional Dravidian architecture and deity figures. Construction began in April 2000 and concluded with a Maha Kumbhabhishekam (consecration ceremony) on 22 May 2002.

=== 2016–2019 restoration ===
Between 2016 and 2019, the temple underwent a three-year restoration project that included waterproofing, structural repairs, and repainting. The project concluded with a consecration ceremony on 14 June 2019. During the November 2017 Penang flash floods, temple icons were temporarily relocated to safety, while the temple building was not damaged.

== Religious and community activities ==
The temple hosts religious ceremonies and annual Hindu festivals, including Tamil New Year.

Newspaper reports published during the 1980s and 1990s describe community programmes organised by the temple's education and welfare committee, including events for children with special needs and educational assistance for underprivileged students.
