= Penang State Route P210 =

Road in the Malaysian state of Penang

Hill Railway Station Road
- Malay: Jalan Stesen Bukit Bendera; Chinese: 升旗山缆车路 / 升旗山纜車路
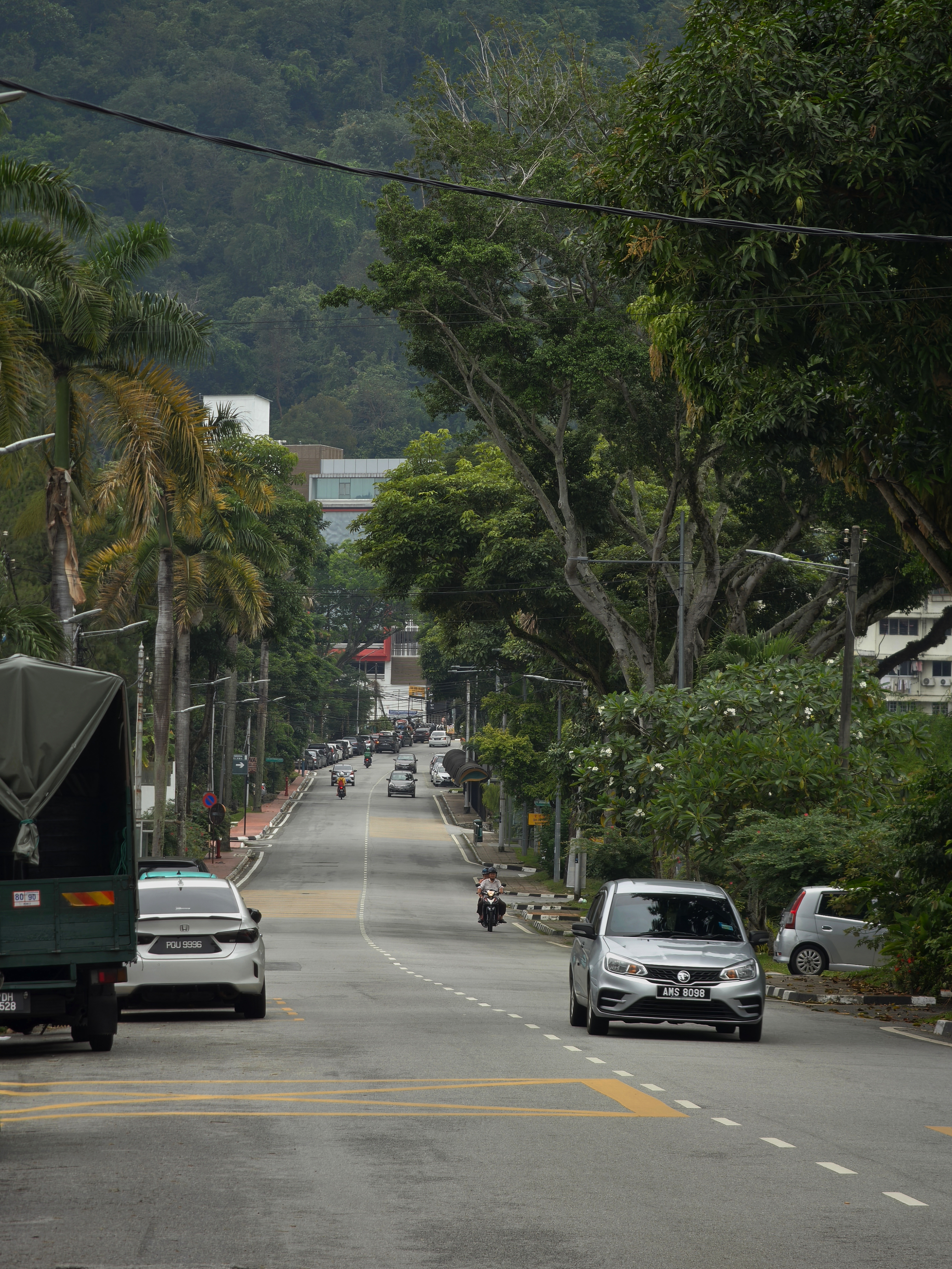

Route information
- Maintained by Penang Island City Council

Major junctions
- West end: Penang Hill Railway Lower Station
- East end: Air Itam Road

Location
- Country: Malaysia
- States: Penang
- Major cities: George Town

Highway system
- Highways in Malaysia; Expressways; Federal; State
- JALAN STESEN BUKIT BENDERA Hill Railway Station Rd11500 AIR ITAM

Hill Railway Station Road, Penang State Route P210 is a road in the city of George Town within the Malaysian state of Penang. Designated as Route P210, it stretches from the suburb of Air Itam to the Penang Hill Lower Railway Station at the foot of Penang Hill.
