= Penang Hill Railway =

Cable railway in the Malaysian state of Penang

Coordinates: 05°24′55.59″N 100°16′26.13″E

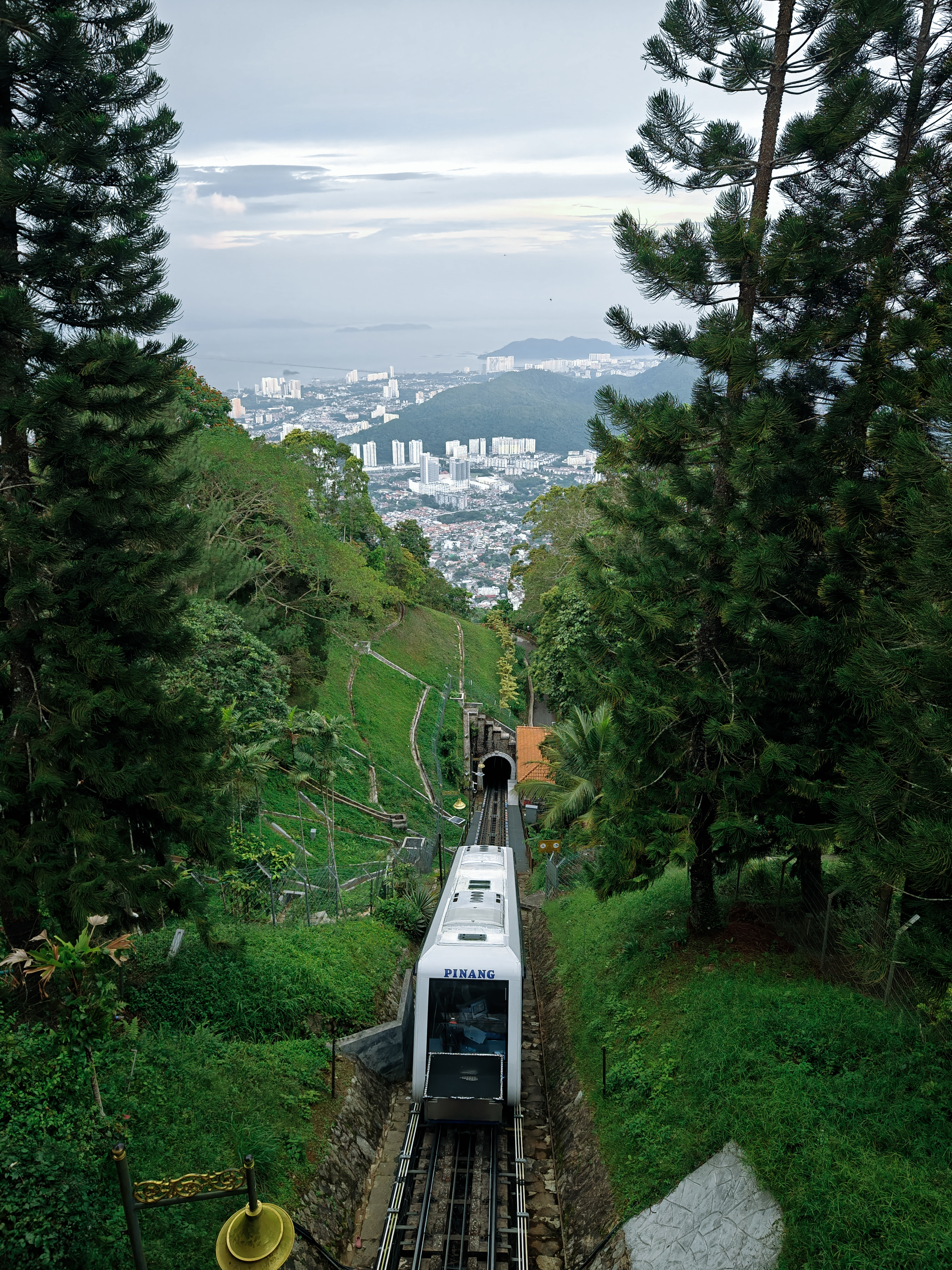
- The latest car, seen looking down the line from the upper station

Overview
- Native name: Kereta api Bukit Bendera
- Status: Operational
- Locale: Penang Hill, George Town, Penang, Malaysia
- Stations: 8
- Website: www.penanghill.gov.my

Service
- Type: Funicular
- Services: 2
- Operator: Penang Hill Corporation
- Rolling stock: 2 coaches of Doppelmayr Garaventa 100-FUL Penang Hill
- Ridership: 1.9 million (2025)

History
- Opened: 21 October 1923; 103 years ago

Technical
- Track length: 1,996 metres (6,549 ft)
- Track gauge: 1,000 mm (3 ft 3 3/8 in)

The Penang Hill Railway (Malay: Kereta api Bukit Bendera) is a funicular railway that climbs Penang Hill, on Penang Island in Malaysia. The line was originally known as the Penang Hills Funicular Railway.

The railway first opened in 1923 as a two-section railway, but was rebuilt and modernised in 2010 as a single section single-track railway with a single passing loop, It climbs from Ayer Itam, on the outskirts of the city of George Town in the state of Penang, passing through a tunnel which was once the steepest in the world.

The total journey time can take between five and twenty minutes, with the cars normally running non-stop between upper and lower stations, although intermediate stops may be made on request.

== History ==
=== Beginnings ===
Penang Hill was established as hill station by the British East India Company, shortly after their acquisition of Penang in 1786. The hill became a cool retreat for the British colonists from the heat of the lowlands and threat of malaria, and many bungalows were built on the summit of Penang Hill for government servants and army officials. Initially access was on foot, by horse, or in a dooly.

The first attempt to build a railway began with a proposal by three British residents, D. Logan, Joseph Heim and Alan Wilson and the formation of a private company in 1897, with funding from the colonial administration. The new company constructed a line between 1901 and 1905. Little seems to be known of this line, other than it used a steam engine, was not a funicular, and that it proved to be a failure due to technical faults.

=== The 1923 railway ===
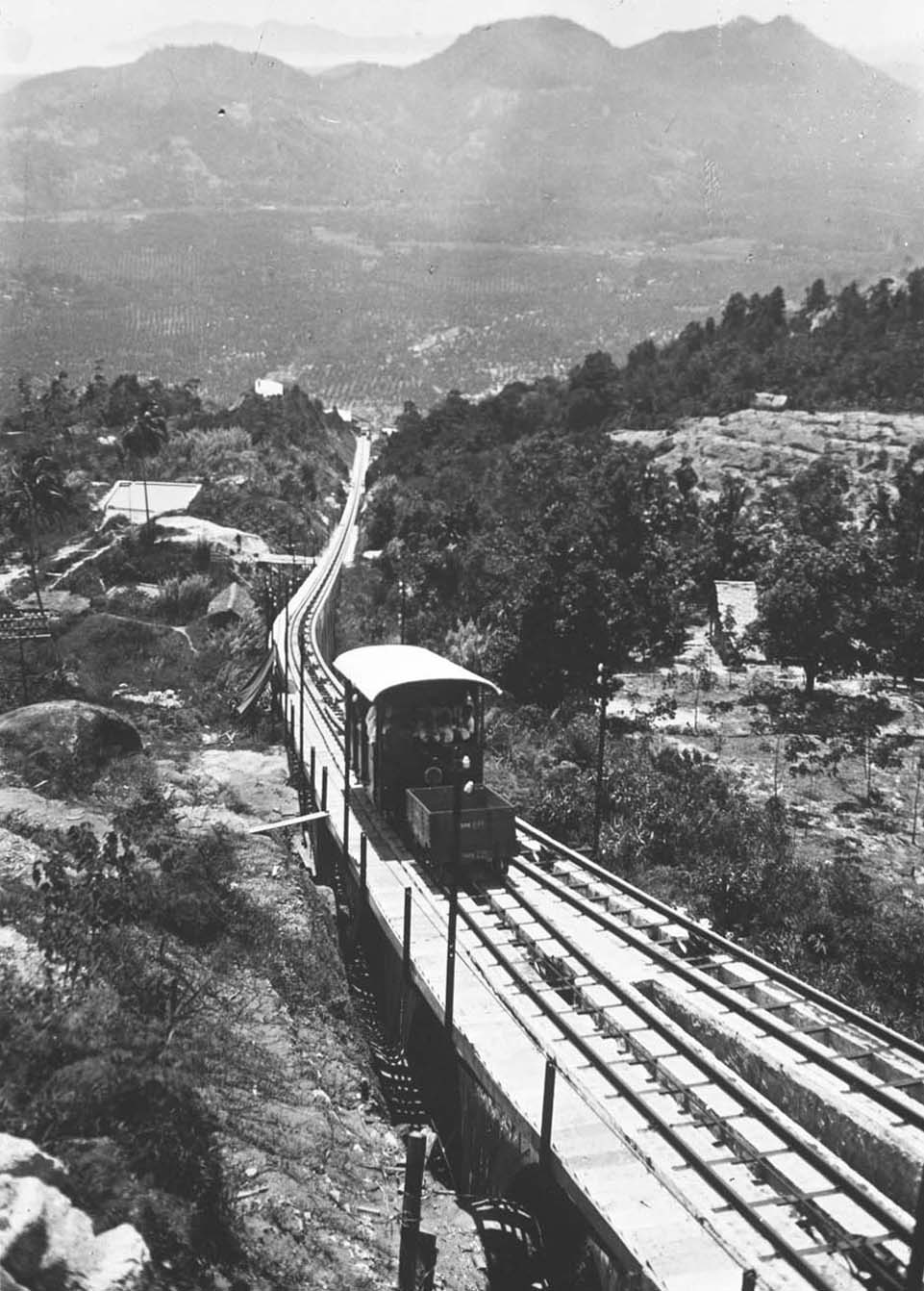
Penang Hill Railway in the 1920s

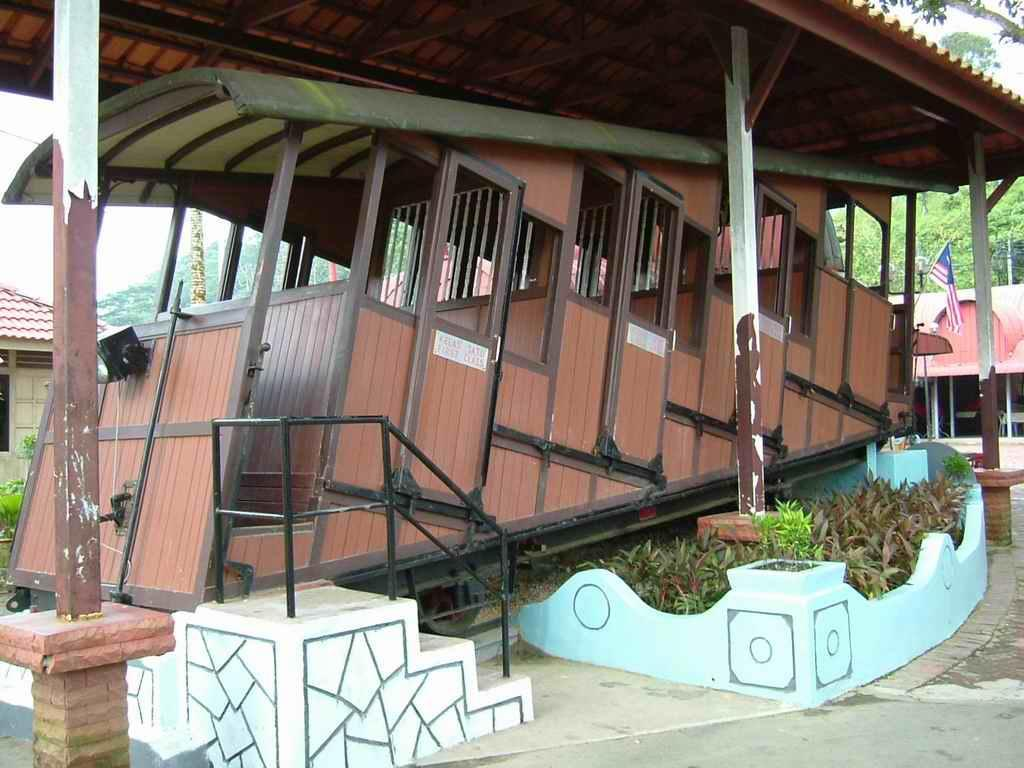
An original coach of the Penang Hill Railway, used from 1923 to 1977.

In 1909, the government of the Straits Settlements organised a new project, the Penang Hills Funicular Railway. This railway project was designed by Arnold R Johnson, an engineer with the Federated Malay States Railways, based on a Swiss design. Construction of the second railway cost 1.5 million Straits dollars. The 2,007 m (6,585 ft)-long funicular railway was informally opened on October 21, 1923 for the commencement of a trial operation.

After a successful trial period, on 1 January 1924, the railway was officially opened by the then Governor of Straits Settlement, Laurence Guillemard. In its first year of operation it carried 35,201 passengers and made 4,021 trips. The Penang Municipality, George Town managed and maintained the railway from its opening until February 1, 1977, when it was taken over by the Penang state Government.

As built, the Penang Hills Funicular Railway had two independent sections due to the difference in gradient between the lower and upper section, and passengers changed trains at a middle station. Besides the top, bottom and middle stations, there were several other intermediate stations, and it took 30 minutes to travel the full length of the line. The upper and lower sections each had a passing loop and two counterbalanced 40-passenger cars, which were wooden with separate first and second class compartments. The cars were pulled by steel cable electrically driven with a 500-volt power supply. The railway had a tunnel which measured 79 m (258 feet) long and was, when built, the steepest tunnel in the world.

=== Upgrade in 1977 ===
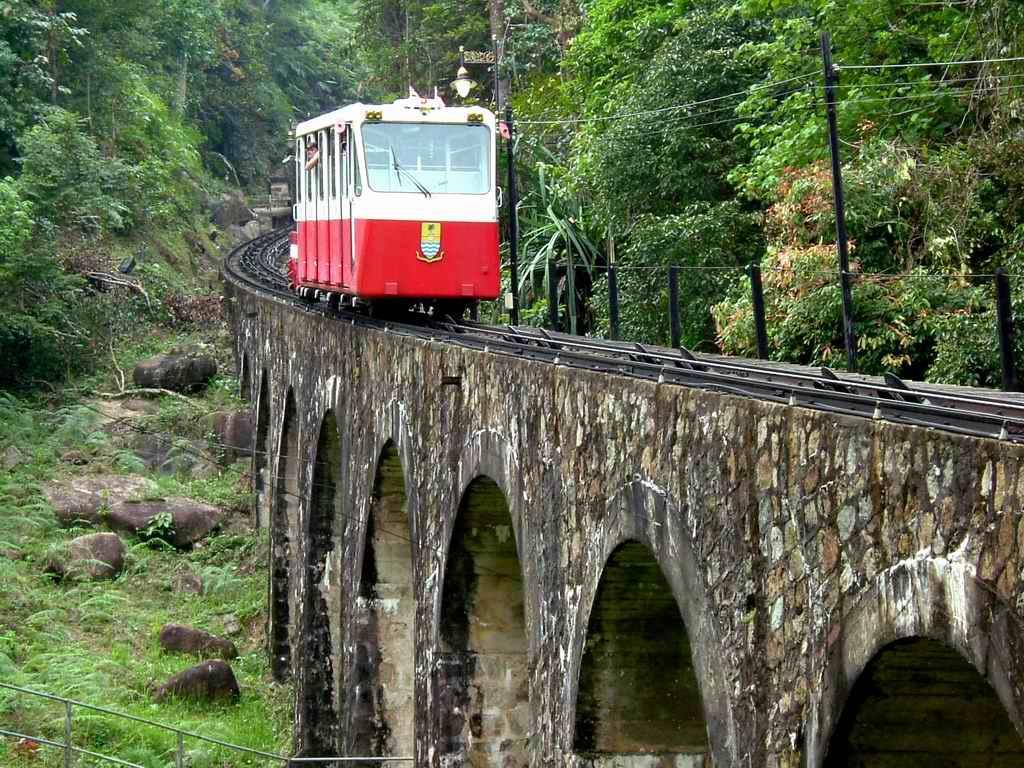
View of an 80-FUL Penang Hill coach used from 1977 to 2010

In 1977 the original cars were retired and replaced with new cars constructed by Maschinenfabrik Habegger of Thun in Switzerland. These cars had fans and automatic sliding doors, were painted in red, and could hold up to 80 people, mostly standing. They were in use for over 30 years until 2010.

=== Rebuild in 2010 ===
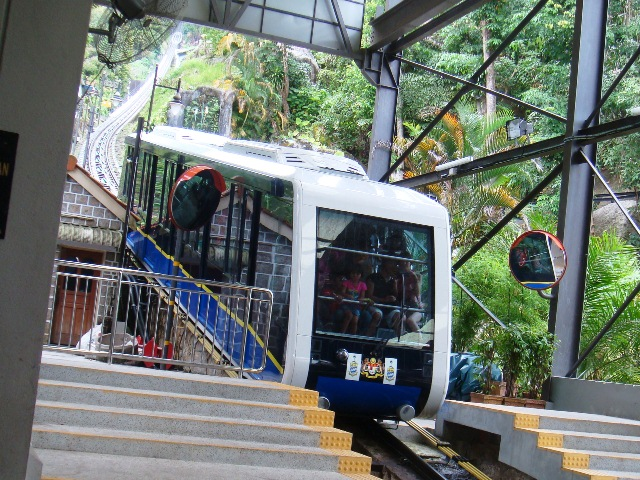
The Doppelmayr Garaventa 100-FUL Penang Hill coach at the lower station

After a series of breakdowns, the idea of a complete rebuild of the system with a new funicular railway was mooted. On 22 February 2010, the 87-year-old funicular railway was closed for an upgrade to a new system at a cost of RM 63 million. New tracks were laid, and new cars purchased to increase the passenger capacity and the speed of the train. A new base station and a public carpark were also constructed. The timber from the old railway track was re-used in the construction of a new four-storey Penang Hill Visitor Centre at the top.

The new train and railway system, unlike the railway before 2010, does not require passengers to change trains halfway up. Passengers now enjoy non-stop service in air-conditioned Swiss-made cars, painted in blue and white, that are capable of ferrying up to 100 passengers in one go. The funicular train's maximum working load has been set at 7,500 kg (16,500 lb). It can carry 1,000 passengers per hour compared to 250 under the old system.

On April 25, 2011, the new railway system resumed its service, although initially there were a number of technical hitches which caused the service to be temporarily suspended. The train service runs from 6.30am to 9pm daily, and the new car can reach the top in as little as five minutes. The upgrade led to a large increase in passengers carried; in 2014, the number of passengers reached 1.365 million, compared to the visitors number to Penang Hill of around half a million in 2008. Ridership increased to 1.74 million by 2018, leading to concerns of congestion. In 2019, a proposed cable car system linking the peak of Penang Hill with the Penang Botanic Gardens was announced by the Malaysian federal government as a means of reducing the overdependence on the railway.

== Stations ==
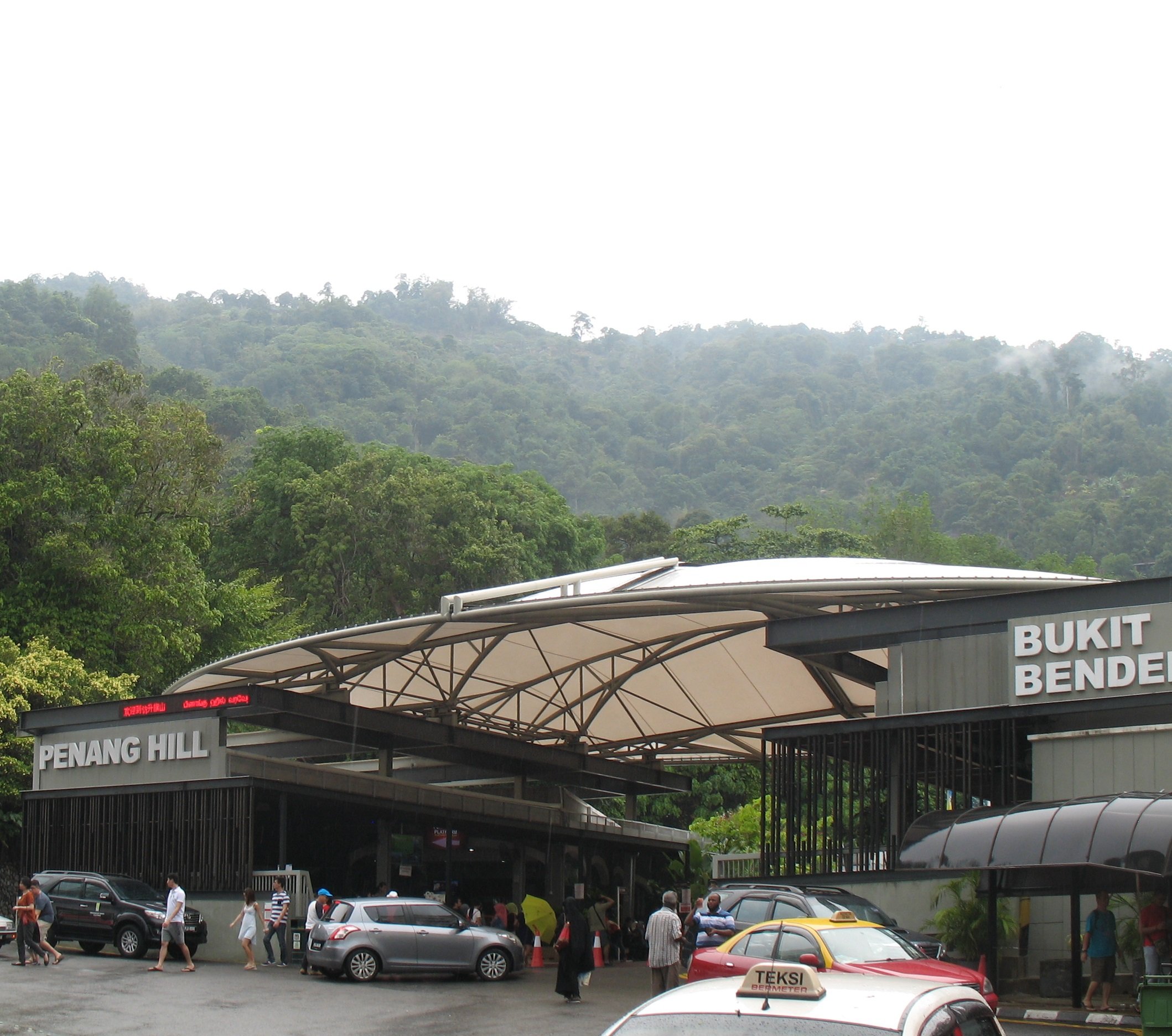
The entrance to the Lower Station at Air Itam for the funicular ride

Visitors can enter the funicular railway at the Lower Station at Air Itam, and the final stop of the ride is the Upper Station at the top of Penang Hill. There are a number of stations along the railway between the Upper and Lower stations - the Middle Station (which is currently open only to residents), as well as the Claremont, Viaduct, and the Lower and Upper Tunnel stations. Since the 2010 upgrade, the train normally proceeds directly to the top without stopping at the Middle Station. It is however possible to stop at some of the intermediate stations by arrangement with the driver.

The Upper Station has been upgraded with the construction of an extended viewing platform named Skywalk, an elevated walkway leading to a food court, as well as a lift, a cafe and a museum gallery.

The Lower Station at Air Itam has been improved with a new building with retractable roof and a new multi-storey car park for visitors travelling by car. Visitors can also reach the station on the 204 Rapid Penang bus from George Town, Penang.

== Fares and tickets ==
For Malaysian citizens, the fare for a return ticket is RM12 per adult and RM6 per child aged between three and 12. Senior citizens have cheaper fares at RM6 per person. For non-Malaysian the fare is RM30 for adults and RM15 for children.

The ride remains free of charge for disabled persons holding the OKU card.

Also unchanged are the fares for Penang Hill residents, licensed traders and hawkers and workers, who can purchase monthly season pass at RM24.

== Technical parameters ==
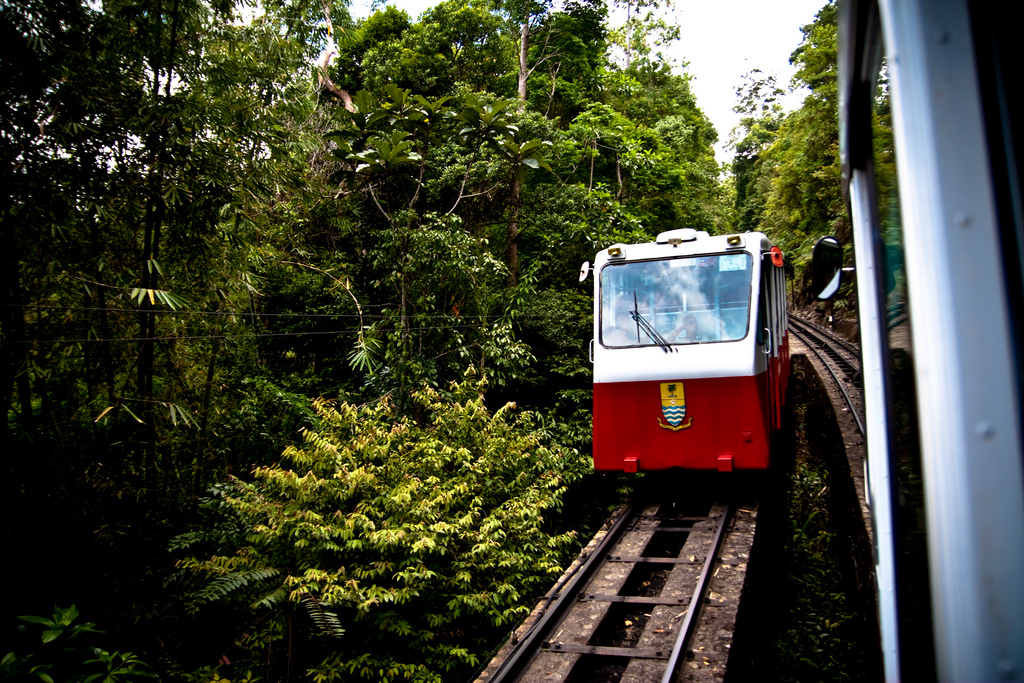
Coaches at a passing loop at Penang Hill Railway

=== 1923-2010 ===
Before 2010, the lower section of the funicular has the following technical parameters:

- Length: 907 metres (2,976 ft)
- Height: 319 metres (1,047 ft)
- Maximum Steepness: 50.5%
- Cars: 2
- Capacity: 80 passengers per car
- Configuration: Single track with passing loop
- Journey time: 11 minutes
- Maximum speed: 1.4 metres per second (4.6 ft/s)
- Track gauge: 1,000 mm (3 ft 3 3/8 in)
- Traction: Electricity

The upper section of the funicular has the following technical parameters:

- Length: 1,313 metres (4,308 ft)
- Height: 367 metres (1,204 ft)
- Maximum Steepness: 51.3%
- Cars: 2
- Capacity: 80 passengers per car
- Configuration: Single track with passing loop
- Journey time: 13 minutes
- Maximum speed: 1.8 metres per second (5.9 ft/s)
- Track gauge: 1,000 mm (3 ft 3 3/8 in)
- Traction: Electricity

=== After 2010 ===
- Length: 1,996 metres (6,549 ft)
- Height: 691.4 metres (2,268 ft)
- Maximum slope: 52.9%, 27.9°
- Minimum slope: 18.8%, 10.7°
- Cars: 2
- Coach empty weight: 14,500 kg
- Maximum payload: 7,500 kg
- Capacity: 100 passengers per car
- Maximum speed: 10 metres per second (33 ft/s)
- Haul rope diameter: 38 mm
- Traction: Electricity
- Main drive motor: 710 kW

== Ridership ==
Penang Hill Railway Ridership
Year	Ridership	Note
2026	910,000	As of 16 July 2026
2025	1,895,022	
2024	1,800,000	
2023	1,660,000	
2022	1,480,000	
2019	1,900,000	
2018	1,740,000	
2014	1,365,000	

== Gallery ==
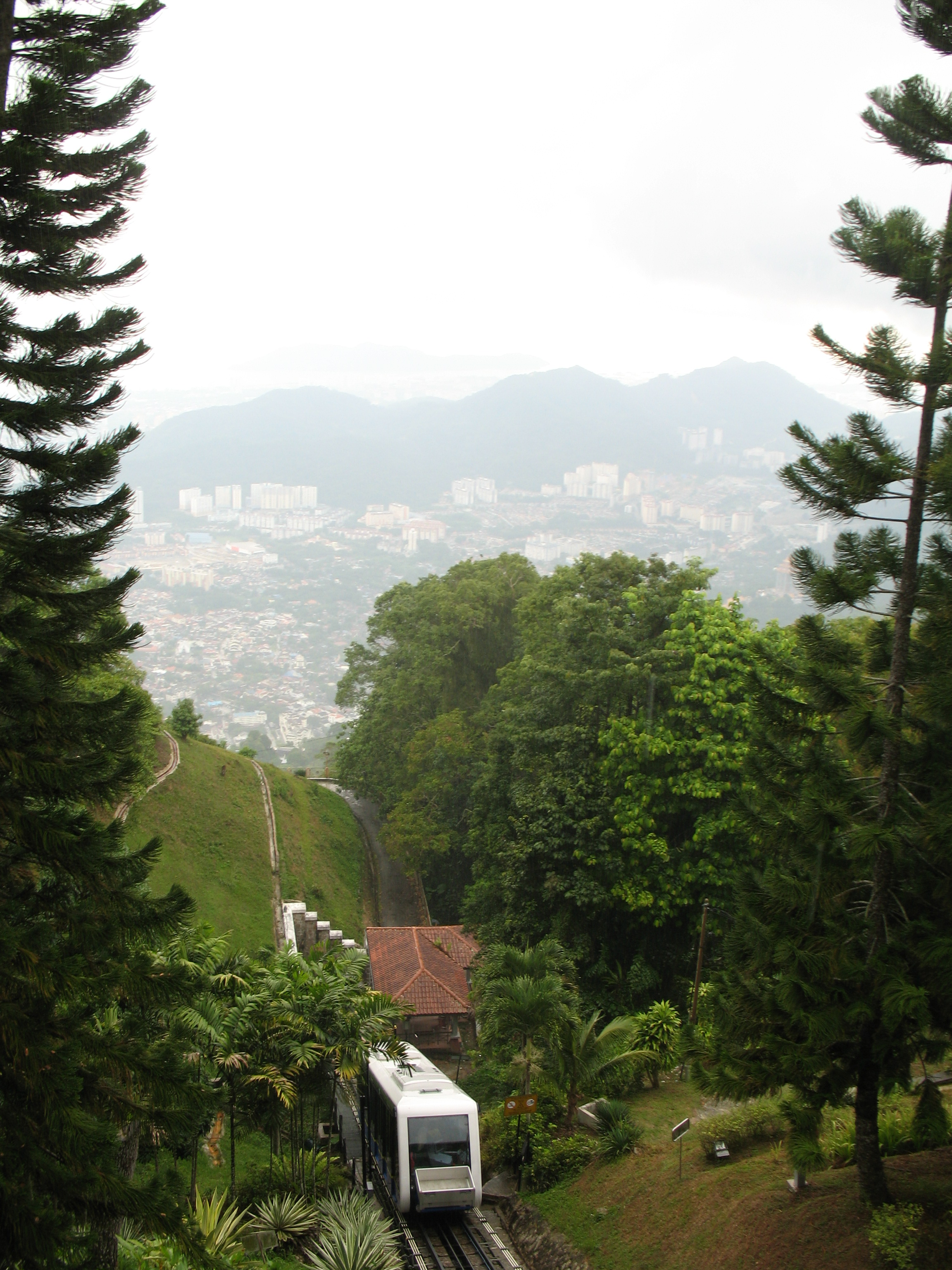
The 100-FUL Penang Hill new coach with view of the city in the background

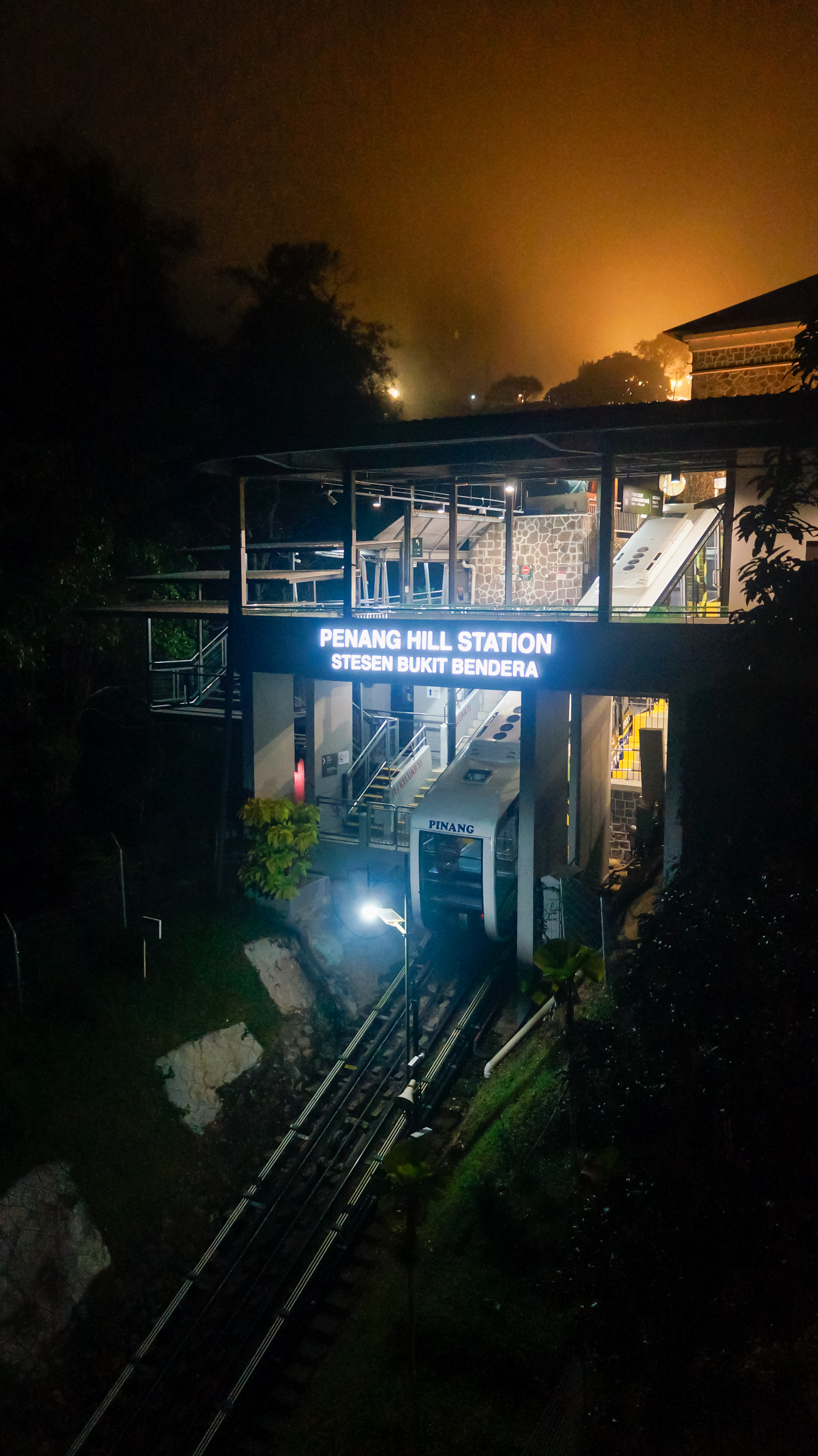
The Penang Hill Upper Station, the final stop of the line at the top, as seen on a foggy night.

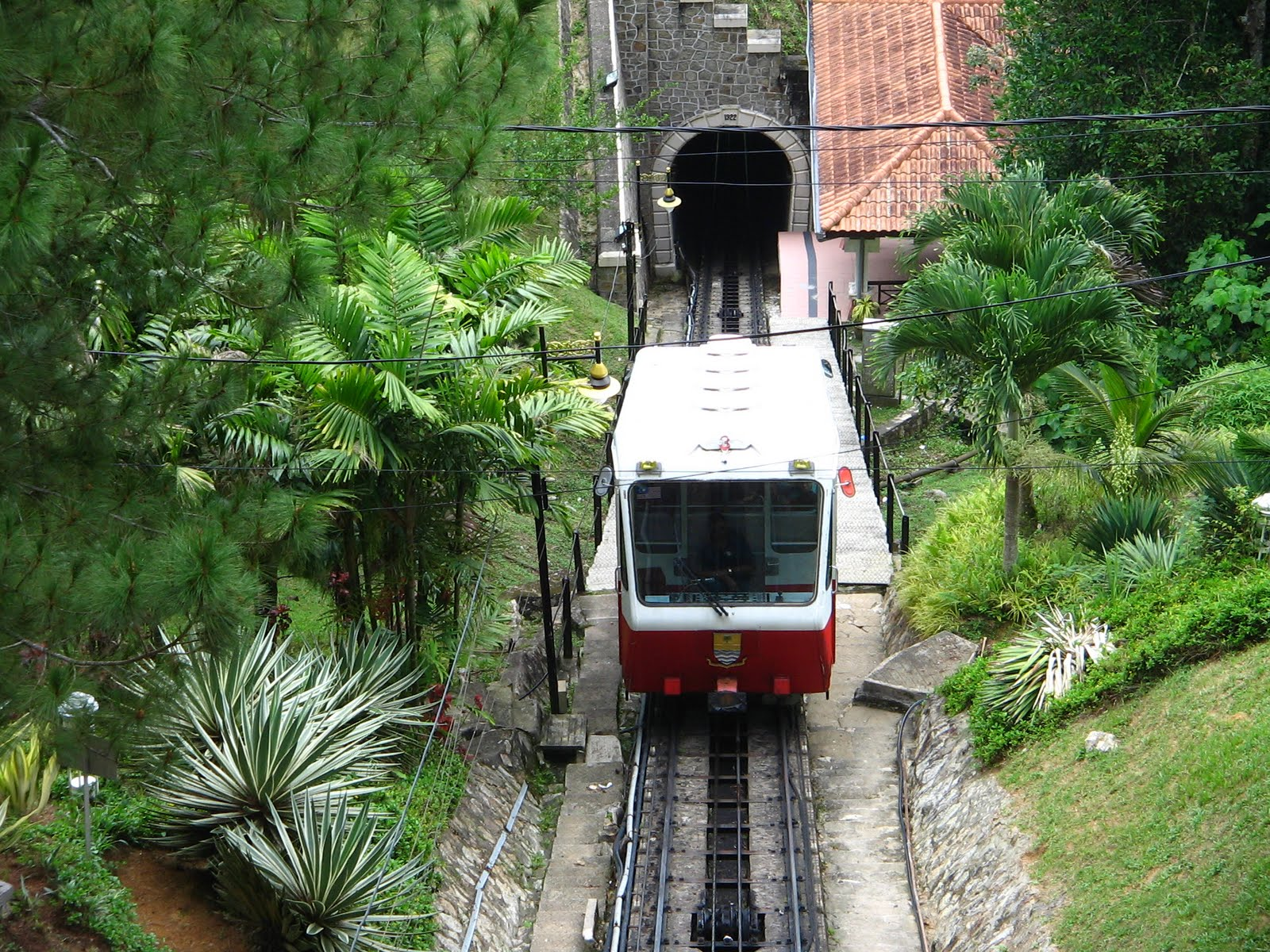
The 80-FUL Penang Hill old coach.

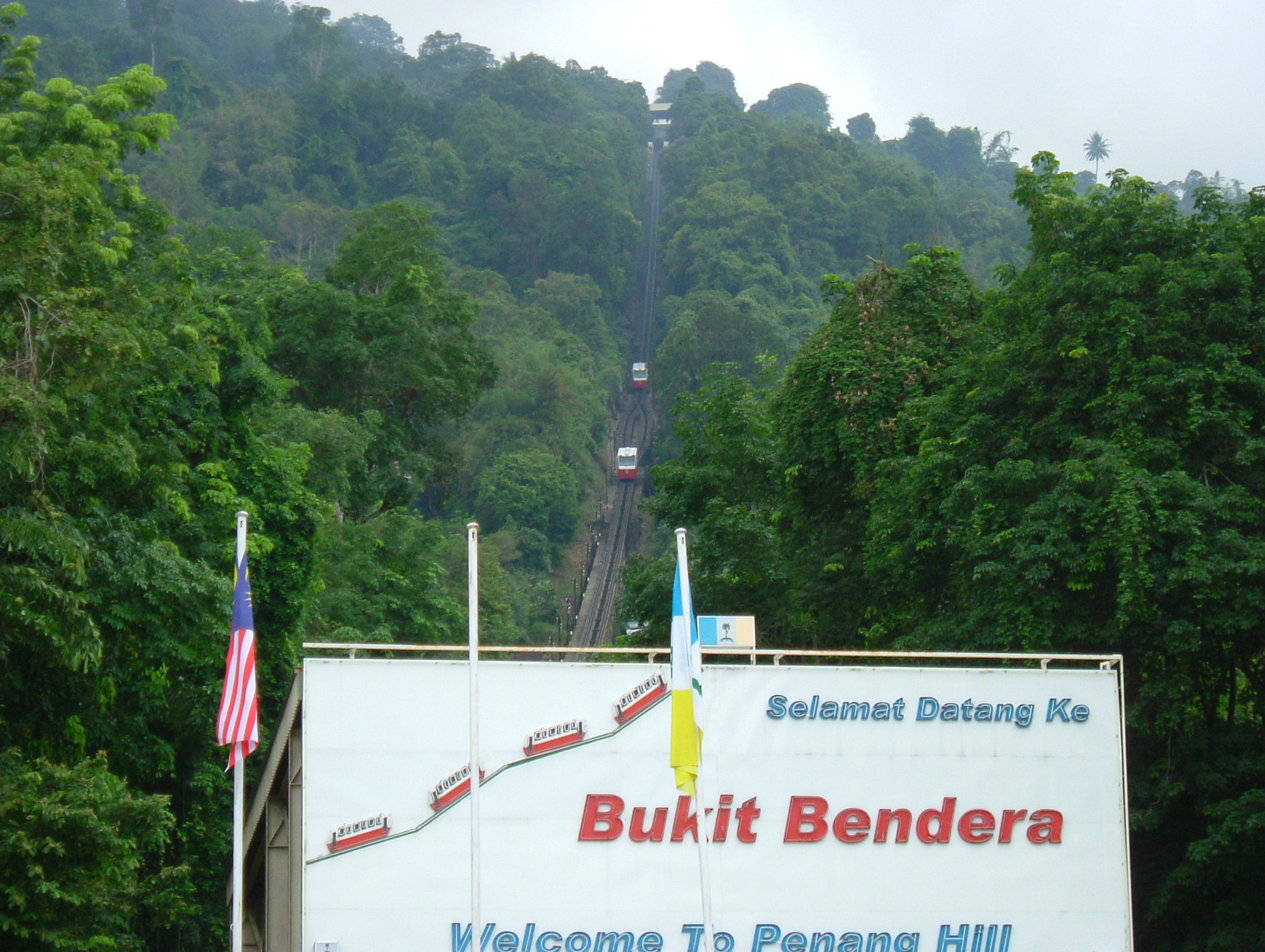
View of the railway from the lower station.

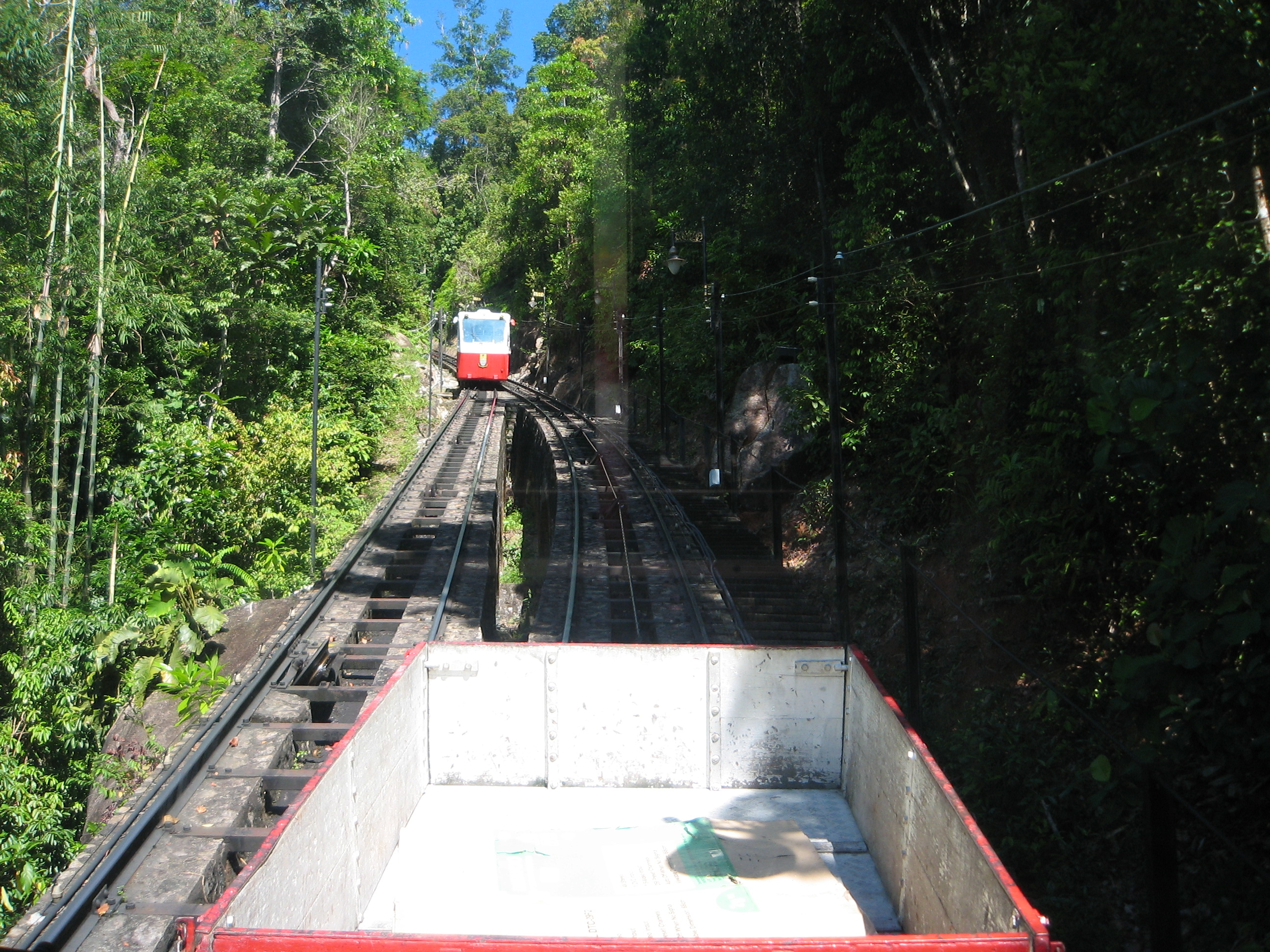
Penang Hill Railway passing loop.

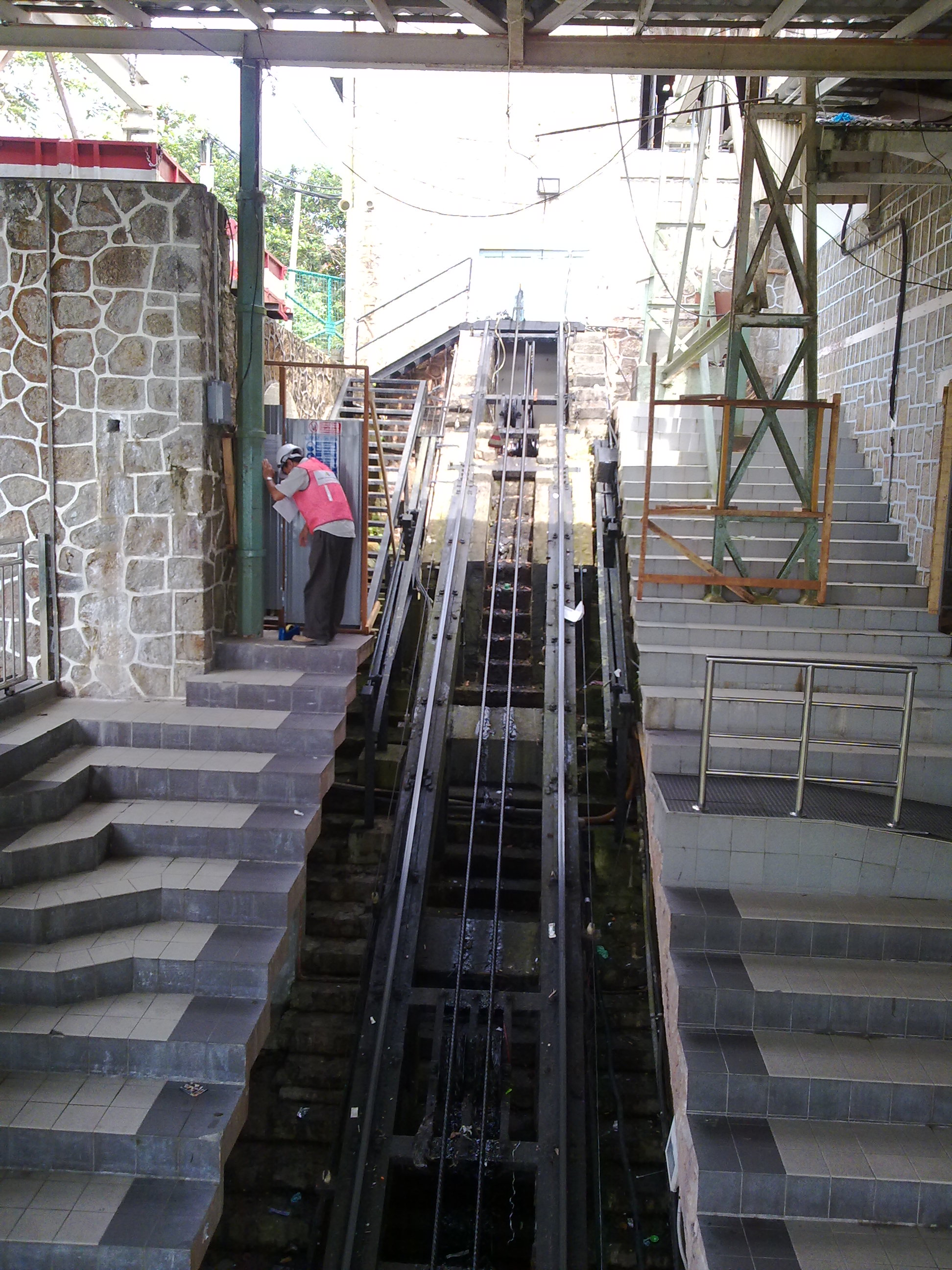
The end of the railway line at the Upper Station

== See also ==
- Awana Skyway - Aerial tramway type, now Gondola lift type
- Genting Skyway - Gondola lift type
- Langkawi Cable Car - Gondola lift type
- Rail transport in Malaysia
