= Penang Hill cable car =

Gondola lift in George Town, Penang, Malaysia

Penang Hill Cable Car
- Location within George Town

Overview
- Status: Under construction
- System: Gondola lift
- Location: George Town
- Country: Malaysia
- Coordinates: 5°26′11″N 100°17′28″E
- Termini: Penang Rifle Club; Penang Hill
- No. of stations: 3
- Services: 1
- Construction cost: RM245 million (US$59.18 million)
- Construction begin: June 2024

Operation
- Owner: Penang Hill Corporation
- Operator: Hartasuma Sdn Bhd
- No. of carriers: 50
- Carrier capacity: 8
- Ridership: 1,000 per hour (design)
- Trip duration: 10 minutes

Technical features
- Manufactured by: Doppelmayr/Garaventa Group
- Line length: 2.73 km (1.70 mi)
- No. of support towers: 15
- Operating speed: 6 m/s (20 ft/s) (design)

The Penang Hill cable car is a gondola lift under construction in George Town, the capital city of the Malaysian state of Penang. The 2.73 km (1.70 mi) line will connect the Penang Botanic Gardens to the peak of Penang Hill and is intended to complement the existing Penang Hill Railway. The cable car line is projected to serve a capacity of 1,400 passengers per hour on each direction. Construction commenced in 2024 and is projected to be completed by 2027.

== History ==
A cable car system complementing the existing Penang Hill Railway was first announced by then Malaysian Minister of Finance Lim Guan Eng in 2019. The funicular railway had recorded a ridership of 1.74 million throughout 2018 and Penang officials were seeking an alternative mode of transportation to reduce the overdependence on the railway. The federal government allocated RM100 million for the cable car project in the 2020 budget, with additional costs to be borne by the Penang state government. The Penang Rifle Club, situated adjacent to the Penang Botanic Gardens, was selected as the ground station over other areas such as Teluk Bahang.

A political crisis in 2020 led to the removal of the Pakatan Harapan-led federal government by the right-wing Perikatan Nasional. As a result, federal allocations promised for the cable car project were cancelled. Despite this, in 2021, the state's Chief Minister Chow Kon Yeow announced a request for proposal for the project, citing "tremendous" public support. The project was to be awarded through a public–private partnership framework, with the selected developer given a 30-year concession to design, finance, build, operate and transfer the system. Six proposals were received by the Penang Hill Corporation (PHC) and in 2022, Malaysian firm Hartasuma Sdn Bhd was awarded the project.

As the cable car project is to be undertaken on slopes between 25 and 35 degrees, federal government oversight was required, involving traffic impact (TIA) and environmental impact (EIA) assessments. To build and operate cable car systems at ecologically sensitive areas, the PHC sought technical expertise from Switzerland and Austria; Penang Hill had been inscribed as a UNESCO Biosphere Reserve in 2021. In 2023, Chief Minister Chow announced that the cable car infrastructure would be provided by Doppelmayr/Garaventa Group.

The cable car project received approval from federal government environmental regulators in 2024. Prime Minister Anwar Ibrahim presided over the groundbreaking ceremony in June that year. The cable car system is expected to be completed by the third quarter of 2026.

== Design ==
The cable car system is designed to cater to a capacity of 1,400 passengers per hour per direction, comprising 50 eight-seater carriages that travel at a speed of 6 m/s (20 ft/s). Citing extensive experience in ropeway engineering within UNESCO-designated sites, Doppelmayr/Garaventa Group has been selected to provide the cable car infrastructure. The line will comprise three stations along its length – Taman, Geling Belokan and Bukit stations.

The project will include the construction of 15 towers – five in the forests, and the other 10 near the upper and ground stations. The foundations are to be built using the hand-dug caisson method to reduce on-site clearing. The PHC stated that only 50 trees would be affected by the construction, primarily African tulip, royal palm and oil palm surrounding the lower end of the route.

== See also ==
- Awana Skyway
- Genting Skyway
- Langkawi Cable Car
