= Penang Hill =

Hill resort in George Town, Penang, Malaysia

- Bukit Bendera
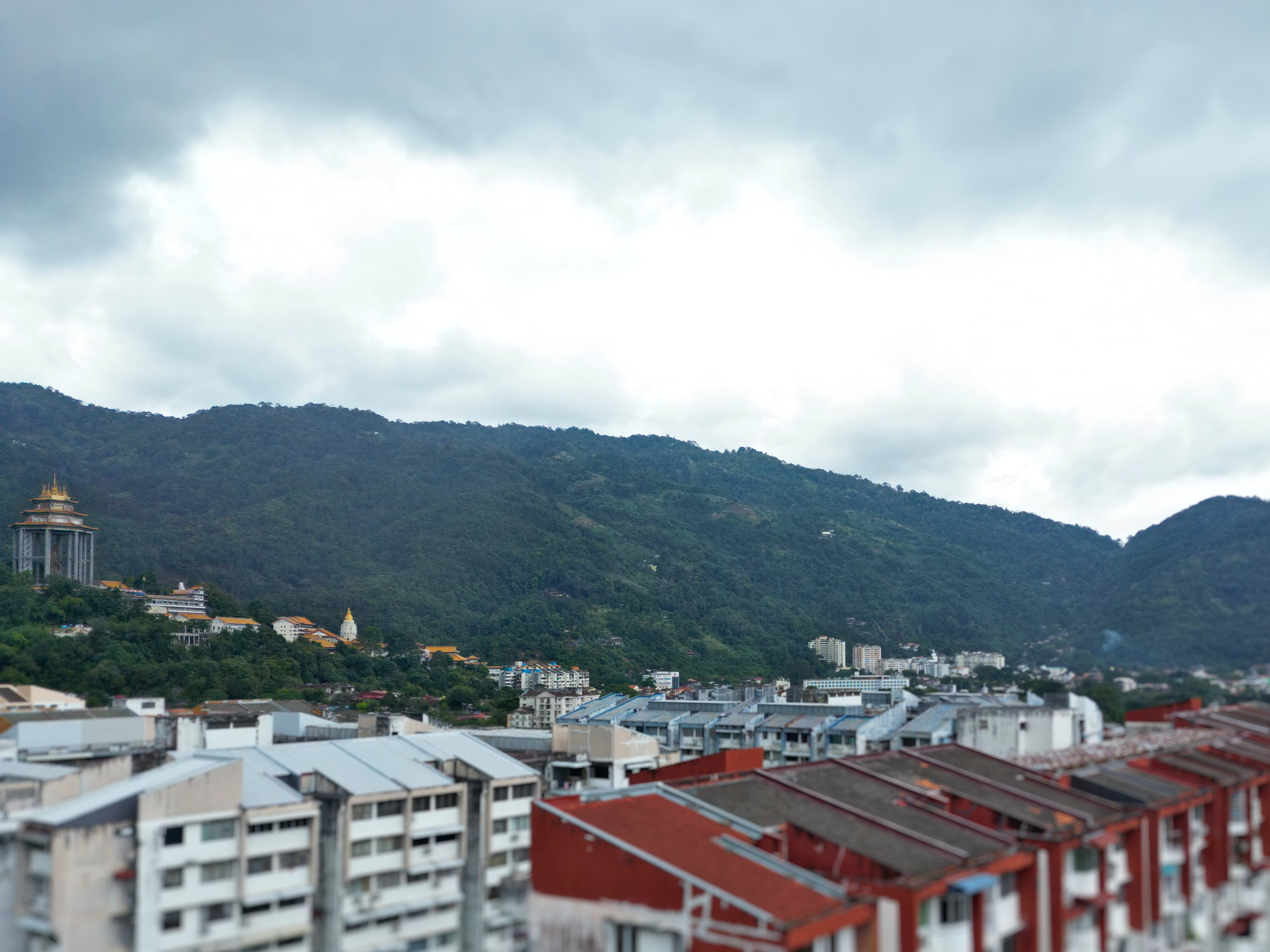

Highest point
- Elevation: 833 m (2,733 ft)
- Prominence: 735 m (2,411 ft)
- Coordinates: 5°25′28″N 100°16′08.1″E

Geography
- Location within George Town, Penang
- Location: Penang Island
- Country: Malaysia
- State: Penang
- City: George Town

Climbing
- Easiest route: Penang Hill Railway

Penang Hill is a hill resort comprising a group of peaks near the center of Penang Island, Malaysia. It is located 9 km (5.6 mi) west of the centre of George Town. Penang Hill is also known by the Malay name Bukit Bendera, which actually refers to Flagstaff Hill, the most developed peak. One of the peaks is known as Strawberry Hill, which was also the name of a house owned by Francis Light, founder of Penang colony.

A number of hills make up Penang Hill, with the highest point being Western Hill, which stands at an altitude of 833 m (2,733 ft) above sea level. Penang Hill is a hilly, forested area that stands out from the lowlands of Malaysia due to its elevation and greenery. The area was used as a retreat during the British colonial period and is now a popular tourist destination because of its history and heritage.

The top of Flagstaff Hill, the most developed tourist area, is accessible via the Penang Hill Railway from its base station at Hill Railway Station Road. To date, this funicular railway system is the only one of its kind in Malaysia, transporting over a million visitors to the top of Penang Hill as of 2014.

Penang Hill is part of Penang Hill Biosphere Reserve, recognized by UNESCO as the third Biosphere Reserve in Malaysia listed in the World Network of Biosphere Reserves (WNBR).

== History ==
Views from Penang Hill

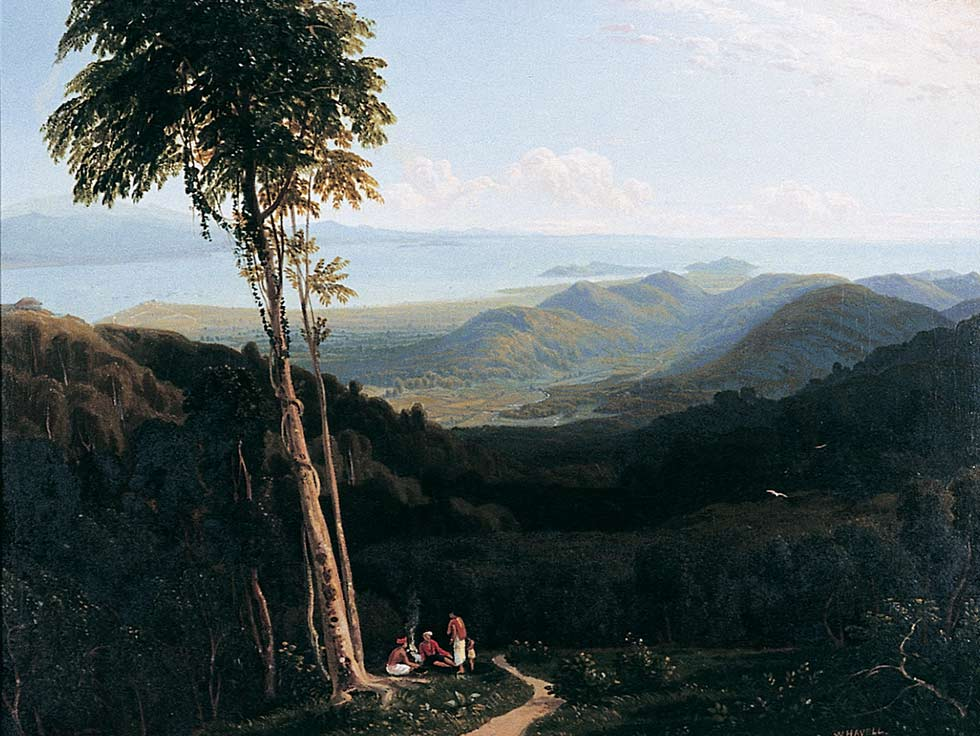
Southeast view towards present-day Gelugor and Jerejak Island in 1817

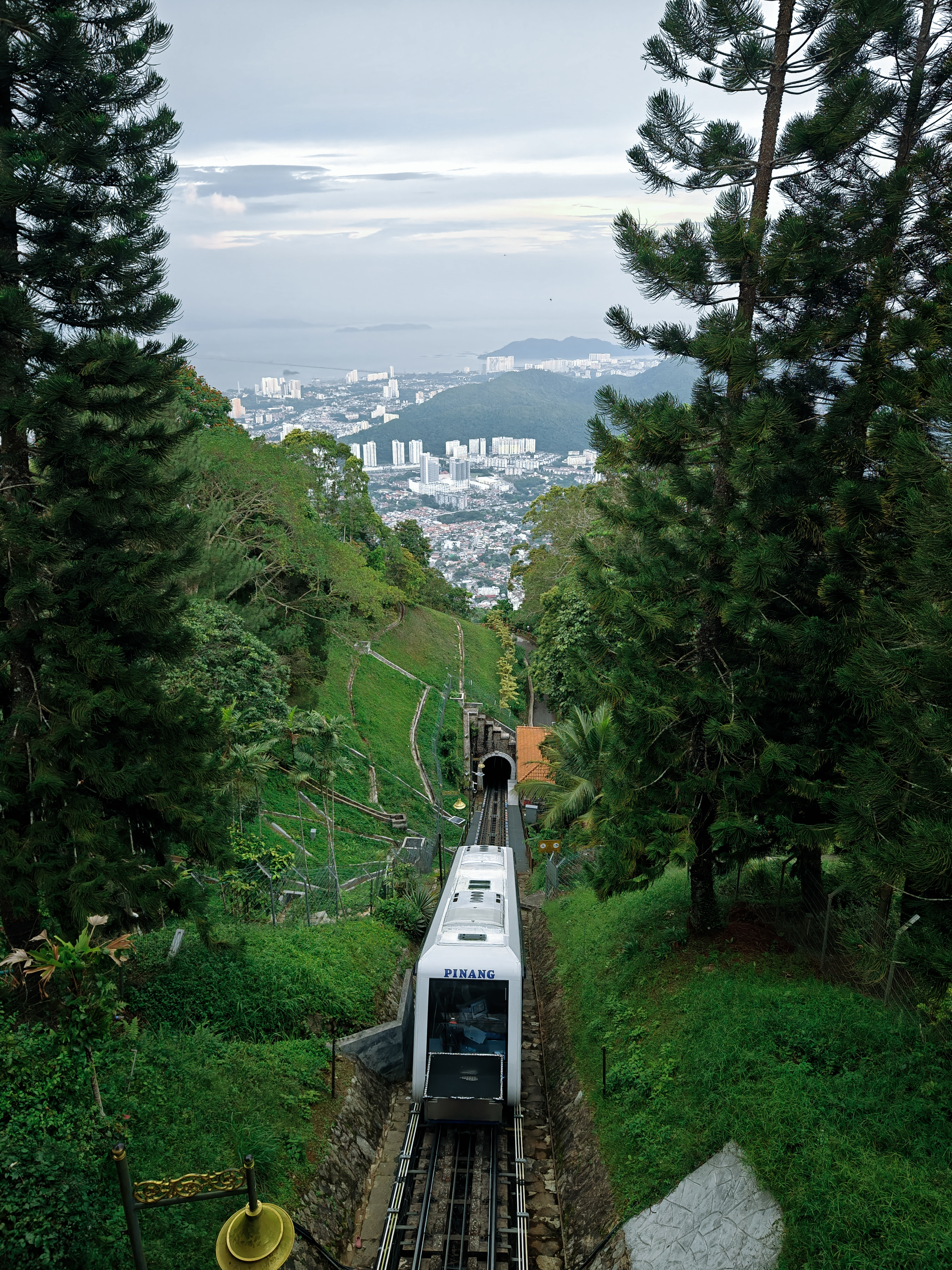
A Doppelmayr Garaventa 100-FUL funicular ascending Penang Hill, with Farlim, Gelugor and Jerejak Island in the background

Captain Francis Light, founder of the colony in Penang, first plotted a horse track from the Penang Botanic Gardens waterfall up to the top of the hill in 1788. He cleared an area in order to grow strawberries, and it therefore became known as Strawberry Hill.

The official name of Penang Hill however was Flagstaff Hill, which is still reflected in its name in Malay, Bukit Bendera (literally "Flag Hill"). The name was a reference to the flagstaff outside "Bel Retiro", which was the residence of the Governor of Penang built by Francis Light c. 1789. The area is, however, widely known as Penang Hill which is, in fact, a collective term covering a number of hills, and the other names such as Flagstaff Hill and Strawberry Hill are still used for specific peaks in the area. The hill became a cool retreat for the British colonists from the heat of the lowlands and threat of malaria, and many bungalows were built on the summit of Penang Hill for government servants and army officials. A convalescent bungalow was built in 1803.

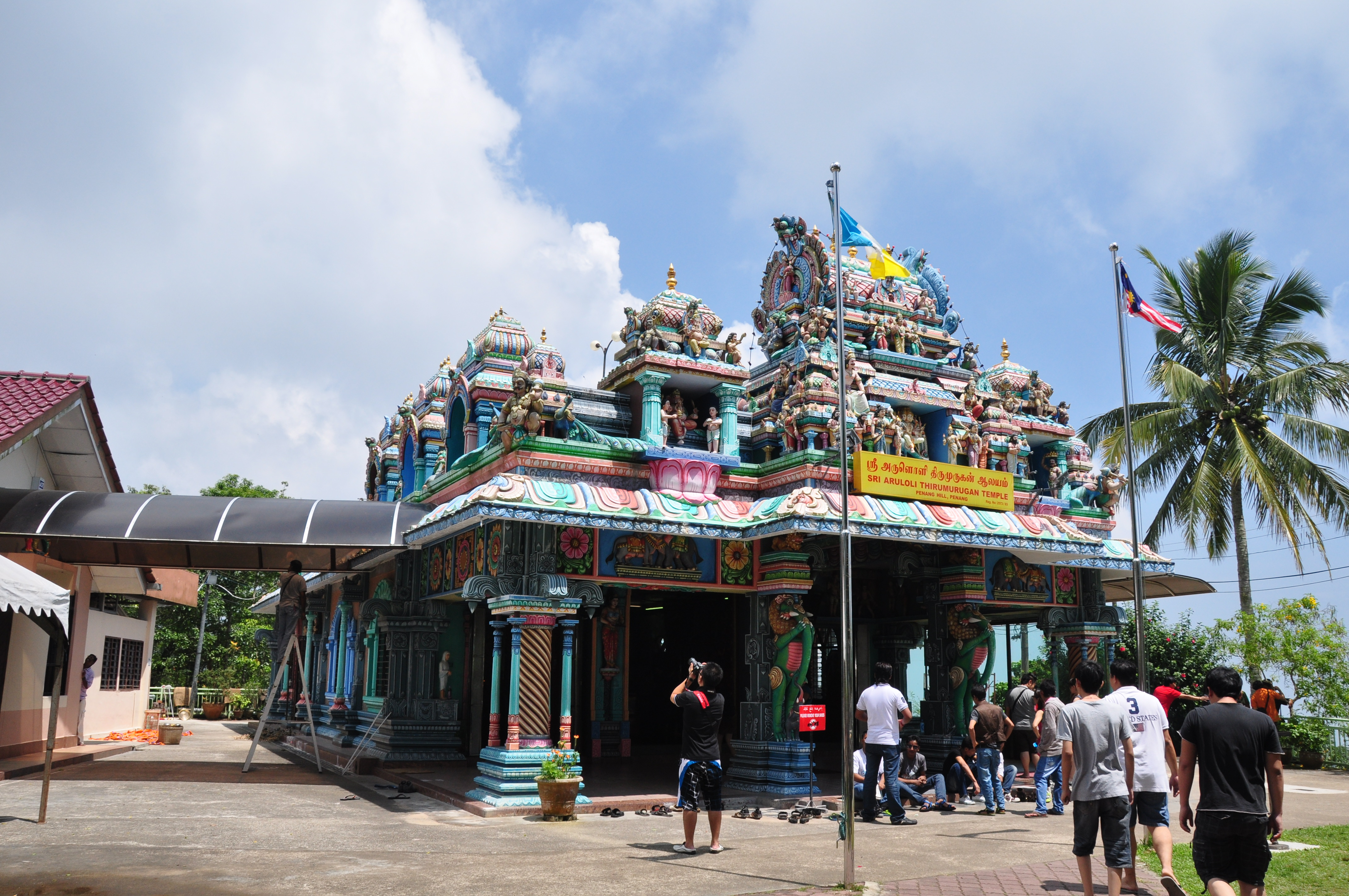
Penang Hill Hindu temple, a famous tourist destination above the hill

One of the earliest buildings on Strawberry Hill was a house built by David Brown on land given by Francis Light. Australian historian Marcus Langdon, however, believes Strawberry Hill house was built by William Edward Phillips, who was also the owner of Suffolk House, and not David Brown. The house, however, burnt down and it was rebuilt in the 19th century, later used as a restaurant as of 2012. The post office was first opened in 1894, and a hotel, the Crag Hotel, owned by the Sarkies Brothers, was established in 1895 but sold in the 1920s; it was operational until it was closed during World War II. The building became a boarding school The International School of Penang (Uplands) from 1955 till 1977. The first police station was built in 1929, and the building is still standing here on the same site.

In the early days the only way to the top of hill was to travel on foot or horseback, or be carried on a dooly (a type of sedan chair). The first attempt at a mountain railway on Penang Hill began in 1897 but it proved unsuccessful; it was built between 1901 and 1905 but had technical faults. The Straits government then organised a new project to construct the Penang Hill Funicular Railway at a cost of 1.5 million Straits dollars. The railway was first opened to the public on 21 October 1923 and officially opened on 1 January 1924. The funicular railway led to a sharp increase in residential development as it became a location for the building of holiday villas and bungalows by Europeans and wealthy local Chinese towkays alike. It also led to its development into a major tourist destination in Penang. It received well over a million visitors a year by 2012.

A major revamp at Penang Hill was initiated in 2010. The railway was overhauled, allowing for faster access to the hill, and facilities for visitors, walkways and viewing decks were constructed.

== Geography ==
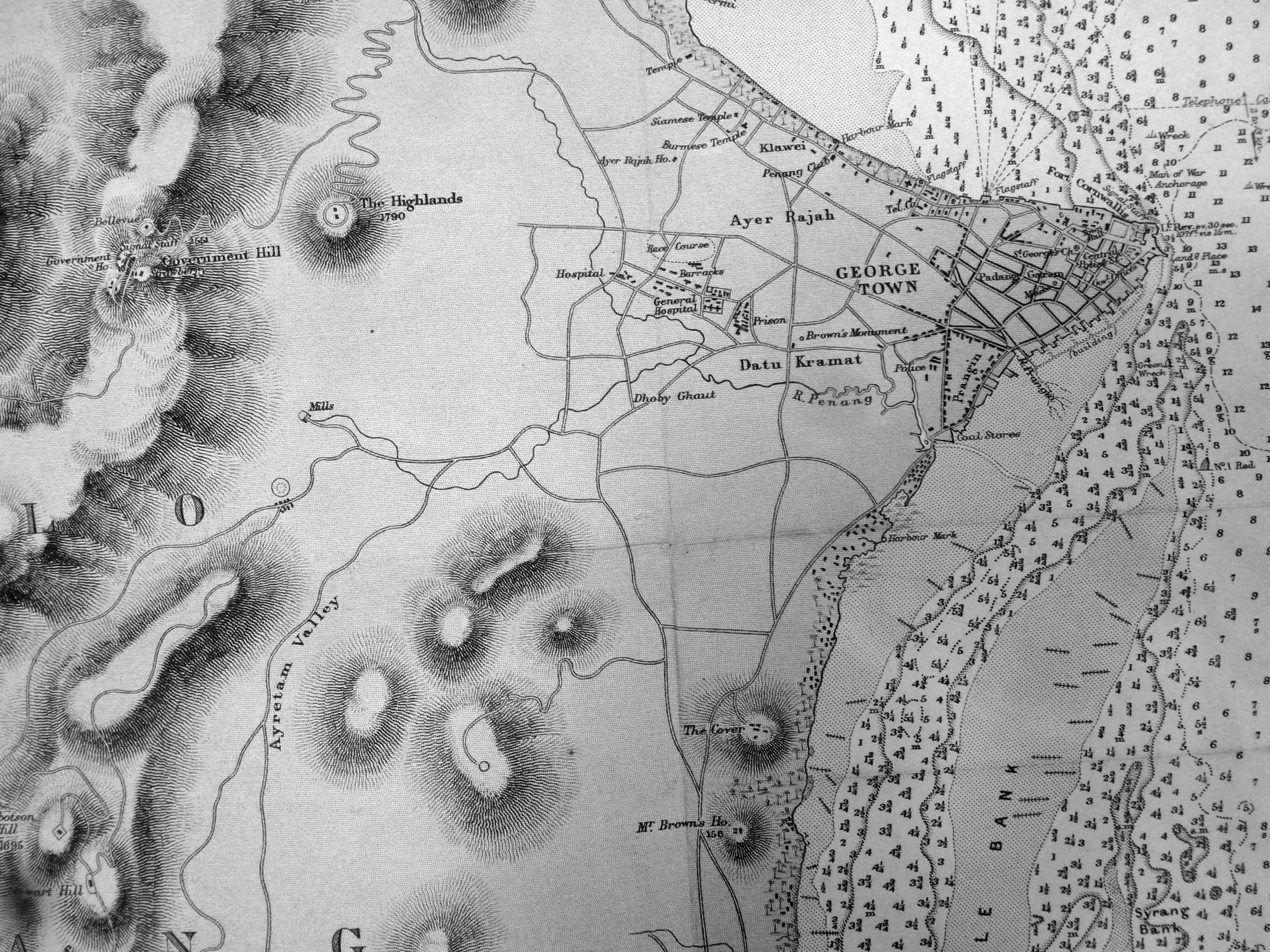
1884 map of northeast Penang Island showing Penang Hill at top-left, labelled "Government Hill".

=== Topography ===
Penang Hill is mainly a hilly granitic mass. The hill system is higher towards the northern part with its highest point at Western Hill, at an elevation of 833 m (2,733 ft) above sea level. Other than Western Hill, there are a number of peaks in the region, such as Bukit Laksamana (Malay for Admiral Hill), Tiger Hill, Flagstaff Hill, Haliburton's Hill, Fern Hill, Strawberry Hill, and Government Hill. Flagstaff Hill is 735 m (2,411 ft) above sea level. A number of small rivers and streams originate from the region. Sungai Pinang (Malay for Penang River) is the largest of the rivers, and it starts from a number of tributaries in the area.

=== Land use ===
Because Penang Hill has a cooler environment, it has been a popular holiday retreat. A number of bungalows were built around Flagstaff Hill. The northern part of the Hills are not well developed. Government Hill, Bukit Timah (Malay for Tin Hill) and others are designated water catchment areas and no development is permitted.

Some recreational potential exists at the upper reaches of the river where the water is relatively clean. In a number of cases, sudden changes in ground level have resulted in a series of small waterfalls and rapids, where bathing, dipping and picnicking are popular.

The lower terrain of the Hills is used mainly for agricultural and residential purposes.

Map of the subdivision of Penang Hill.
Click link at the top right corner to zoom in.
1 Upper Station
2 Viaduct Station
3 Claremont Station
4 Middle Station
5 Penang Hill Square
6 Bel Retiro
7 Bellevue Hotel
8 Crag Hotel

=== Accessibility ===
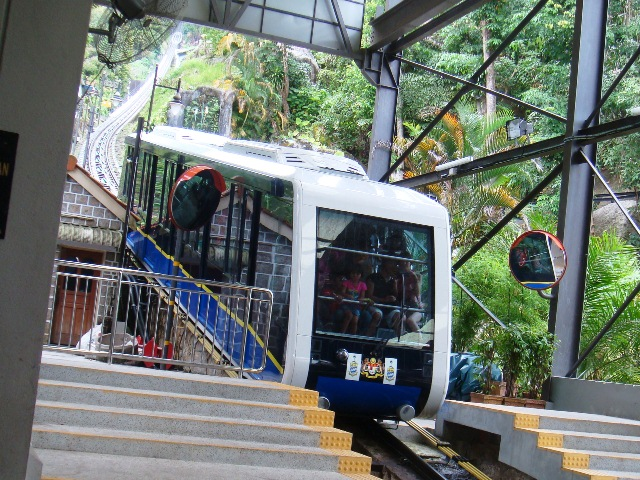
Penang Hill Railway funicular rolling stock, which was last upgraded in 2010.

The most convenient way up to Penang Hill is by means of the Penang Hill Railway, a funicular railway from Air Itam to the top of Flagstaff Hill. The 2,007 m (1.247 mi) journey used to take about half an hour and the train may stop at intermediate stations upon request. However, upgrades to the system now allows non-stop rides to the top in five to ten minutes.

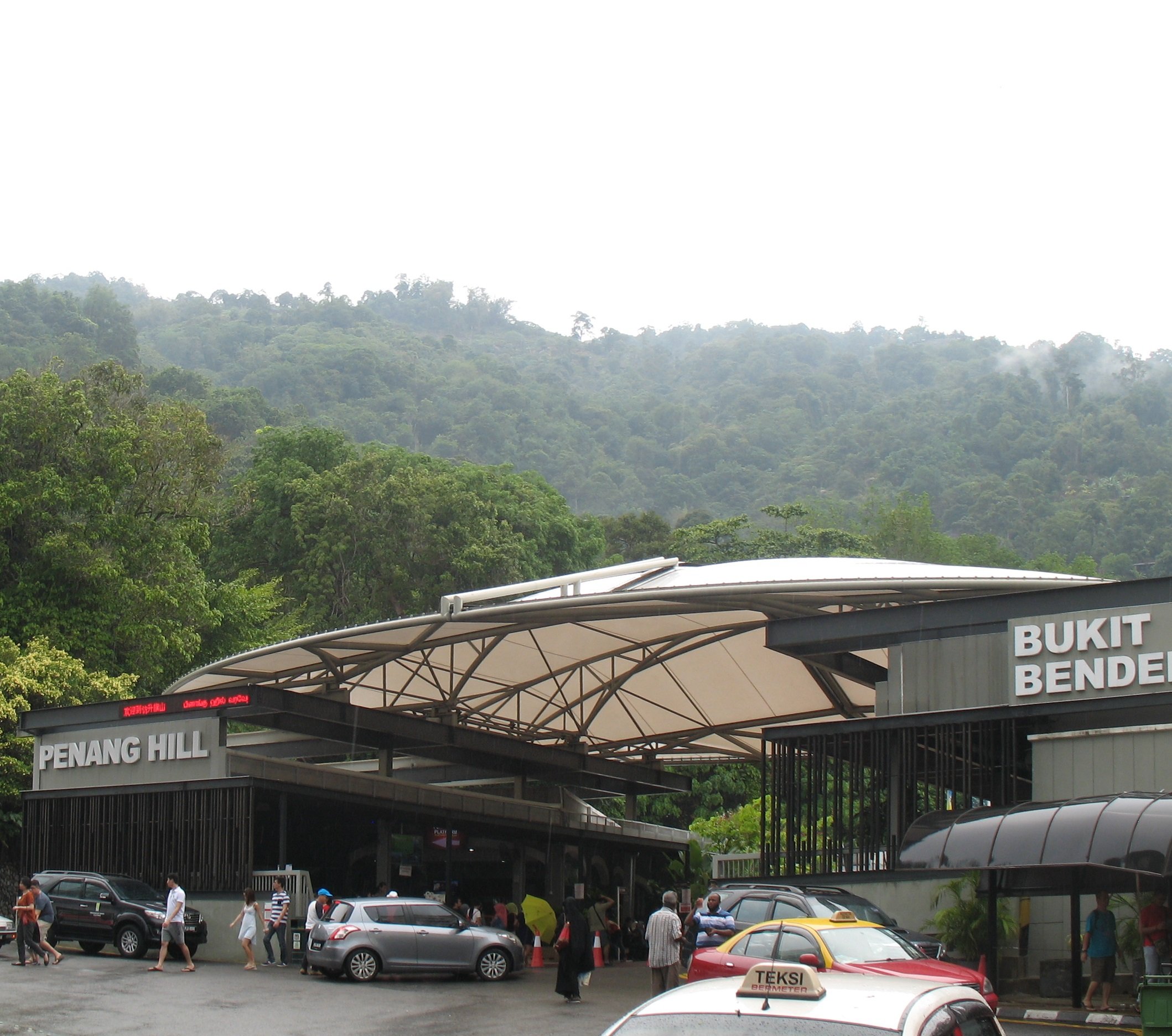
Penang Hill Railway Lower Station, located at the western end of Hill Railway Station Road.

As a means of reducing congestion and decreasing reliance on the railway, a cable car system linking the peak with the Penang Botanic Gardens is being built as of 2024. The system is expected to be completed by 2026.

Alternatively, there is a 5.1 km (3.2 mi) tarred road known popularly as the "jeep track". It is open only to the vehicles of hill residents. The "jeep track" is also used by off-road motorcycle enthusiasts to traverse up the steep terrain. It is a popular hiking route. It begins at the quarry at the entrance of the Penang Botanic Gardens and it takes a two- or three-hour leisurely hike to reach the top. Some of the more famous pit stops at the mountain are 52 and 84. At these pit stops, a view of the island is visible to hikers, who are able to get some water and tea prepared by locals stationed on the hill. Eighty Four is the last pit stop before the top of Penang Hill—approximately forty-five more minutes from 84.

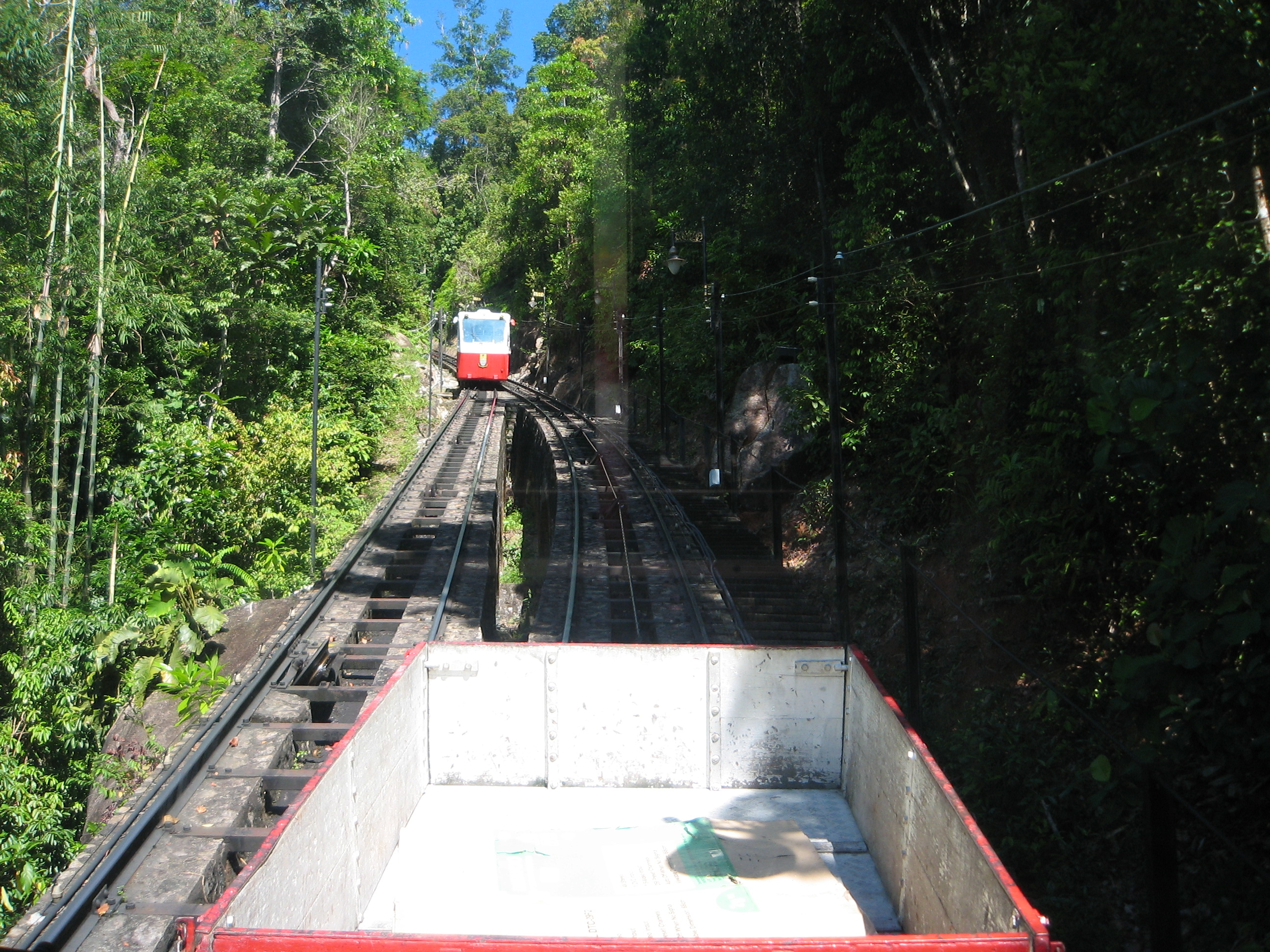
Penang Hill Railway passing loop

Jalan Sultan Yahya Petra, more commonly known as Summit Road, leads from the top station to the western part of the hill right towards Western Hill and Tiger Hill.

The eastern face of Penang Hill is well served by a series of roads and paths, for example, Moniot Road, Viaduct Road, and Tunnel Road. Moniot Road is named after a Frenchman, Michael Jules Moniot who surveyed it between 1846 and 1855. Moniot Road has been declared a Heritage Trail in 1995 by the Governor of Penang.

A system of bridle paths forms walks connecting the different bungalows. Indian penal servitude prisoners shipped from Bencoolen, Sumatra, to Penang during the second half of the 19th century built these by-paths.

Numerous trekking trails lead from various starting points in the lowlands to Penang Hill. The more popular trails include the Moongate Trail, trail from Air Itam Dam to Tiger Hill, trail from Hye Keat Estate and trail from the Municipal Park (formerly Youth Park). Some of the trails are used by farmers to transport produce to the markets of Balik Pulau and Air Itam.

== Climate ==
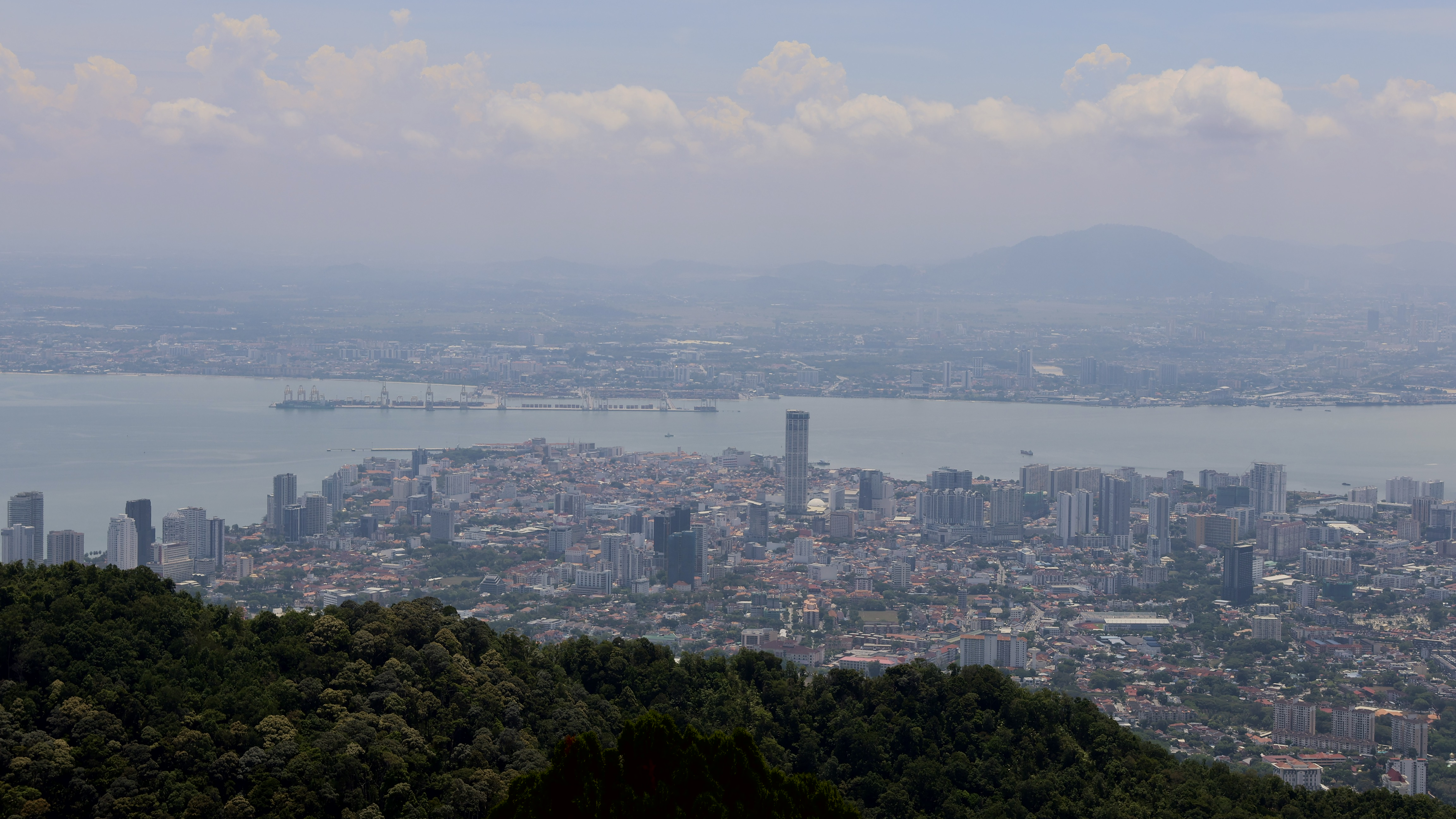
The city centre of George Town viewed from Penang Hill

The most important feature of Penang Hill is the cooler climate. The core summit area has an average temperature ranging from 20° to 27 °C. The mean minimum temperature is consistently below 21 °C. The hottest months are between December and April while the coolest months are between June and October. It is generally 5 degrees cooler than the city centre.

== Demographics ==
Ethnicities within Penang Hill in 2020
Ethnicities / Nationality	Percentage
Non-Malaysians	77.1%
Chinese	12.7%
Indians	6.0%
Others	2.1%
Malays	1.8%
Other Bumiputeras	0.3%

As of 2020, Penang Hill was home to a population of 332. Non-citizens constituted over 77% of the population, followed by Chinese at nearly 13% and Indians at 6%.

== Plant and animal life ==
=== Flora ===
The most common forest type found on Penang Hill is the hill dipterocarp forest. Growing at higher altitudes are some of the submontane oak-laurel as well as coniferous trees. The tree fern which is normally associated with higher elevations is also found growing here.

Penang Hill is scientifically important as a type site of many Malaysian plant species. In the past, botanists came here to collect plants for herbaria around the world. It is an area rich in biodiversity and has a great number of endemic species, some of which are so rare that their existence is endangered.

The rare and endangered species include the parasitic plant Exorhopalia ruficeps, which grows in the shady and damp undergrowth. The Penang Slipper Orchid (Paphiopedilum barbatum) is fast becoming over-collected and disappearing. The endangered witch hazel Maingaya malayana was rediscovered years ago and has since been propagated.

=== Fauna ===
Large mammals are not found on Penang Hill. Wild boars, small and medium-sized mammals such as the squirrels, monkeys and tree shrews can be seen. A number of species found in these hills are nocturnal. These include the civets, colugos, flying squirrels and bats.

In the evenings, the characteristic calls of the crickets are often heard. If one is discerning enough, the stick insect and leaf mantis may be found well-camouflaged among the vegetation.

Penang Hill has a rich bird fauna. Over 100 species or about 80% of the birds found on Penang Island have been recorded here. They range from the common garden species to rare deep forest inhabitants.

== Sources ==
- Malaysian Nature Society, Penang Branch. Selected Nature Trails of Penang Island. ISBN 983-40170-0-6.)
- Malaysian Nature Society, Penang Development Corporation (PDC) et al. Penang Hill – A Part of Our Heritage brochure
