= Penang Botanic Gardens =

Botanical garden in George Town, Penang, Malaysia

Coordinates: 5°26′23.85″N 100°17′18″E

- Malay: Taman Kebun Bunga; Chinese: 槟城植物园; Tamil: பினாங்கு தாவரவியல் பூங்கா
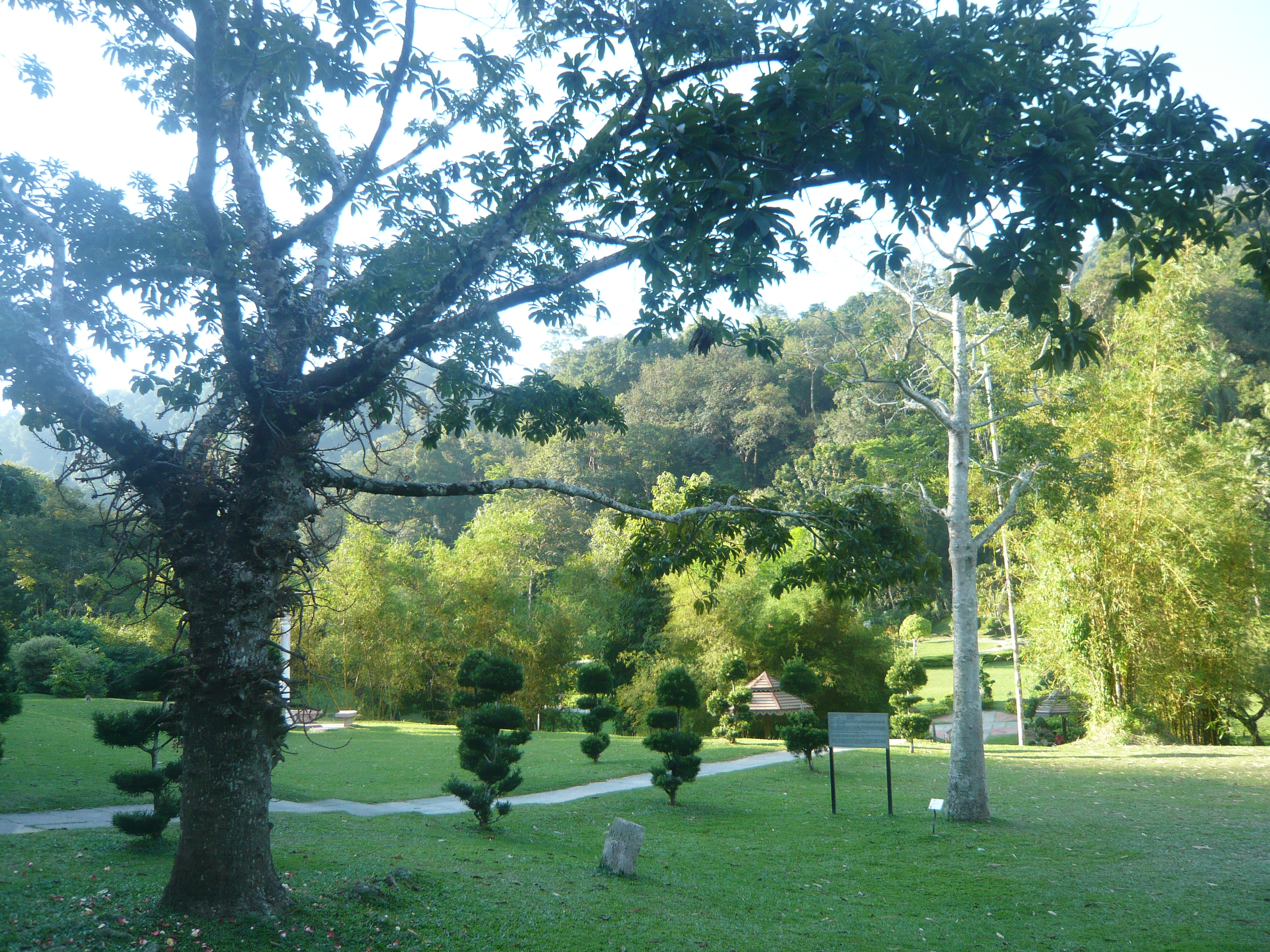
- Interactive map of Penang Botanic Gardens
- Type: Botanical garden
- Location: George Town, Penang, Malaysia
- Created: 1884
- Status: Open all year

The Penang Botanic Gardens is a botanical garden within the city of George Town in the Malaysian state of Penang. Situated at Jalan Air Terjun (Waterfall Road), it is also colloquially known as the Waterfall Gardens because of the cascading waterfall nearby.

The original gardens were established in 1884 from an old quarry site, under the supervision of Charles Curtis, who was the first superintendent, making it one of the oldest botanic gardens built by the British in a colonial settlement.

Penang Botanic Gardens is part of Penang Hill Biosphere Reserve, recognized by UNESCO as the third Biosphere Reserve in Malaysia listed in the World Network of Biosphere Reserve (WNBR).

== History ==
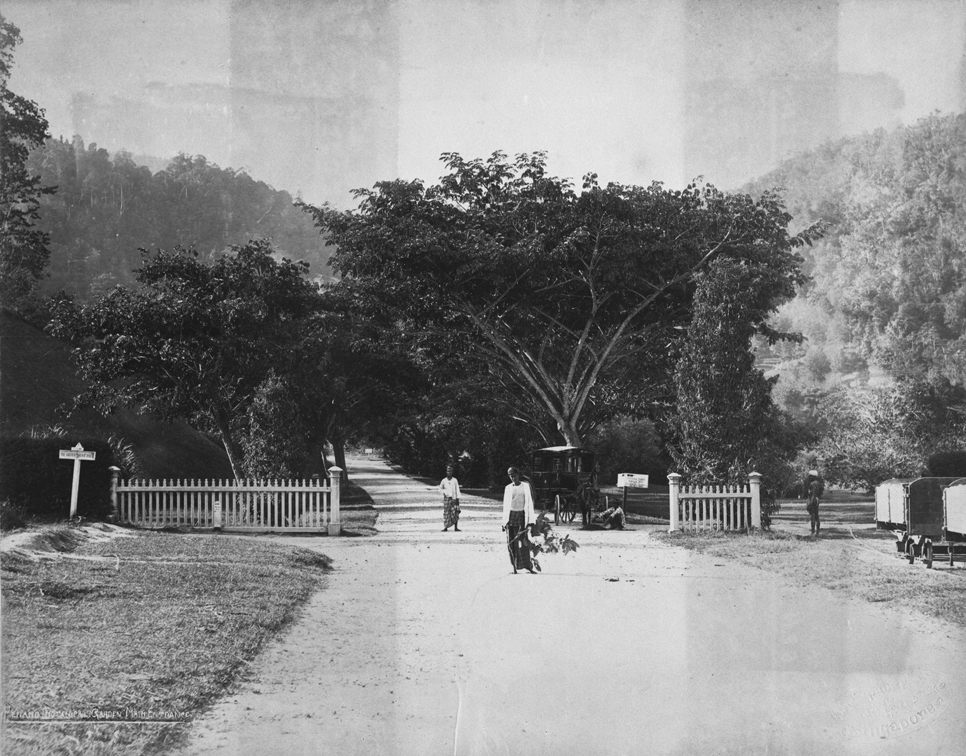
Entrance to the Penang Botanic Gardens circa 1890

Prior to the establishment of the present gardens, there were two previous botanic gardens on Penang Island.

=== The spice gardens (1794–1806) ===
George Town was established on Penang Island in August 1786; the settlement enabled the East India Company to establish a strategic base to challenge the Dutch spice trade and maritime supremacy in the Straits of Malacca.

In 1794, the Company appointed Christopher Smith as botanist to Penang to establish the spice gardens on Penang Island. Smith, who had originally trained at Kew Gardens, planted a small garden of "20 orlongs" [10.5 ha] in 1794 in the middle Ayer Itam valley and a larger garden, of "300 orlongs" [158 ha], at Sungai Keluang. The exact location of both gardens is unclear.

In 1796, Smith was sent to the Moluccas, to serve as superintendent of their botanic gardens and to collect specimens of nutmeg and clove for planting in the Penang Gardens. By 1800 there were some 1,300 plants in the two Penang gardens, with Sungai Keluang now predominantly growing pepper plants. That year, a delivery of a further 15,000 clove and 1,500 nutmeg trees together with canary nuts and sugar palms arrived from Ambon Island. The size of this delivery led to the enlargement of the Ayer Itam gardens and Residency grounds; as a result, Smith was instructed by Lieutenant Governor Leith to return to supervise this enterprise and cease collecting further specimens in the region. By 1802 Smith reported that there were 19,000 nutmeg and 6,250 clove trees under his supervision. In the 1804–05 financial year, the Gardens supported 80 "coolies" and an operational budget of $11,909.

Captain James Low (writing in 1836) described the Gardens during this period as: "... embracing one hundred and thirty acres of land, lying on the slopes which skirt the base of the hill near Amie's Mills, a romantic spot and well watered by a running stream now called Ayer Putih. This plantation, in some respects a mere nursery, contained in the above year [1802] the number of 19,628 nutmeg plants, varying from one up to four years old, 3,460 being four years of age. There were also 6,259 clove trees, of which 669 were above six, and under seven years old."

Following further collecting trips, Smith returned to George Town in 1805, accompanied by 71,266 nutmeg and 55,263 clove plants together with additional canary nut and sugar palm specimens. On his return, Smith was appointed superintendent of the Botanic Gardens, but died unexpectedly in George Town soon afterwards. By now, George Town had been elevated to the status of India's fourth presidency, and Lieutenant Governor Leith had been succeeded in 1803 by Colonel Robert T. Farquhar. Farquhar sold the Gardens' contents at 12 days' notice for $9,656. Most of the specimens were removed and replanted elsewhere by various purchasers.

=== The kitchen gardens (1822–1834) ===
In 1822, the then Governor of Penang, William Edward Phillips, established the second gardens, following the urging of Sir Stamford Raffles, the superintendent of the Singapore Botanic Gardens. Raffles' friend, the Danish naturalist Dr. Nathaniel Wallich, recommended the appointment of Penang Free School headmaster and amateur botanist, George Porter, on a salary of $100, to manage these gardens. Porter, formerly a member of the Calcutta Gardens staff, had accompanied Wallich to Singapore in 1822. Wallich had named a dwarf Dracaena, Dracaena porteri, after Porter. While Porter accepted the position of superintendent he was nominally in charge under a local judge, a Mr. Leycester, who was appointed curator. These gardens were also sited in the Ayer Itam valley; possibly on the same government land reserve as the previous gardens.

The Gardens were tended until 1834, when the then Governor Kenneth Murchison, "who took no interest in gardens or agriculture", sold them for 1250 rupees "because his wife could not get enough vegetables from the gardens to diminish her cook's bills", although the reason may also have been due to Straits Settlements cost-cutting measures executed by the Governor General Lord George Bentinck. Following the sale, Porter apparently returned to his former position as headmaster.

== The present gardens ==
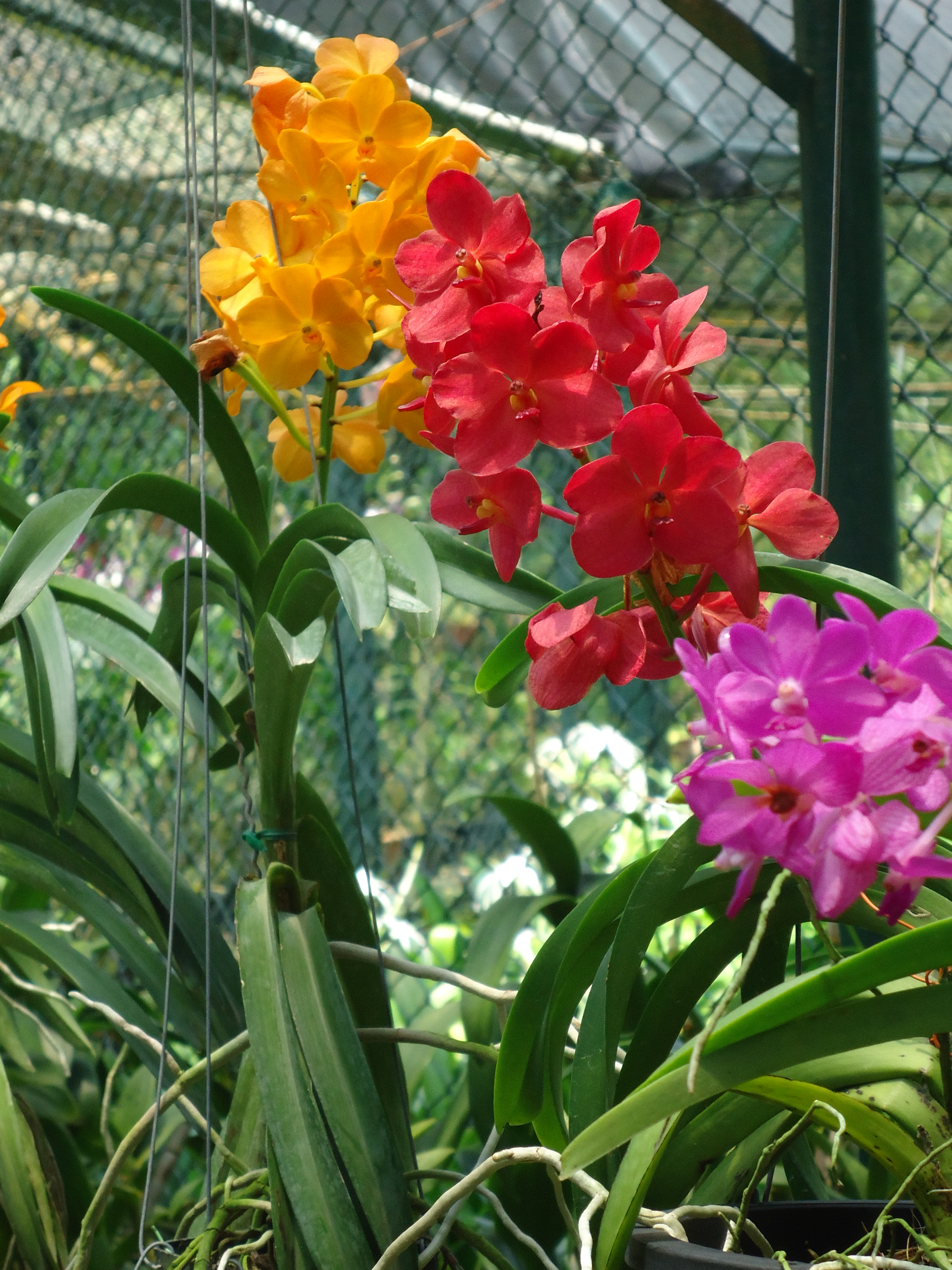
Beautiful flowers in Penang Botanic Gardens

=== Foundation to 1903 ===
In 1884 Nathaniel Cantley, superintendent of the Singapore Botanic Gardens, established the present Botanic Gardens and appointed Charles Curtis as the assistant superintendent. At its inception, the Botanic Gardens Department was administered by the Gardens and Forests Department of the Straits Settlement. It was engaged mainly in the cultivation of commercial plants, inspecting crops and advising the planting community. When the work connected with economic crops and forestry were taken over by the Agriculture and Forestry Departments, Curtis made himself responsible for the layout of the Botanic Gardens and their transformation from an old granite quarry site.

Under Curtis three "Experimental Gardens" were established, including the "Waterfall Nursery Gardens" (580 m) that was developed into the present Botanic Gardens, the "Top Hill Nursery" (777 m) later renamed the "Government Bungalow Garden", and the "Plains Nursery" later comprising the Government Residency. Located at 579 m, with an average annual rainfall in the 1890s of 381 cm, the site of the Botanic Gardens embraces over 29 ha, comprising a significant middle portion, of the Waterfall River valley below the Waterfall which cascades from a height of over 120 m. The heavy rainfall often resulted in management problems, and land slips in the "steepest part of the grounds". The third Botanic Gardens were eventually sited in the Waterfall River valley on land acquired by the colonial government in 1884–85 for this purpose. Curtis records that much of this land was owned by a Mr Hogan.

On his appointment as the first superintendent of the Botanic Garden, Curtis was presented with a tropical valley, including a nutmeg plantation with associated structures, and a prominent location on the trail to and at the foot of the "Great Waterfall". While an avid and acknowledged botanist and plant collector, he proved himself to be a creative landscape designer in crafting the design and development of the Gardens.

On accepting the position, Curtis proposed a long-term strategy as to the development of the gardens and its potential role as a botanical repository and clearing house. Curtis' immediate actions were to develop a plant nursery and undertake a programme of works to create a pleasurable recreational and botanical garden in the valley. This vision was spelt out in detail in his 1885 annual report to Cantley as part of the Department's Annual Report. This included proposals to extend and develop the existing "Waterfall Gardens", the construction of road circuits, the erection of plant-houses for the propagation and cultivation of various species, and the provision of recreational venues.

His immediate steps in 1885–86 were focused upon increasing the area of the Gardens in the valley together with improving road and pedestrian access. In his 1885 report, Curtis commented on "the poor gravelly soil in the valley" which required that considerable attention should be given to the preparation of the ground for tree planting. However, the "natural advantages of the surroundings, from a landscape gardening point of view ... in a great measure compensate for this defect."

From the outset, Curtis introduced aesthetic considerations into the design of the Gardens, through the strategic placement of trees and the clearance of jungle. The circular road circuits he had constructed carefully weave through the valley opening up views, framing vantage points, and providing surprises to the visitor. Curtis' design was motivated by his objective to take advantage of and exploit the natural landscape in the first instance, and then locate plantings in functional or species family associations. A later supervisor, Frederick Sydney Banfield, observed of the planting design structure established by Curtis that: "There is little systematic arrangement even in the botanical sections, the principal aim having been to arrange the plants in such a way as to enhance the natural beauty of the Gardens".

Curtis suffered from ill-health during his time as superintendent of the gardens, which he attributed to the quality and location of the accommodation made available to him. In March 1903, health problems caused him to take early long service leave and he formally retired on 7 December 1903, to be replaced by Walter Fox.

=== Since 1903 ===
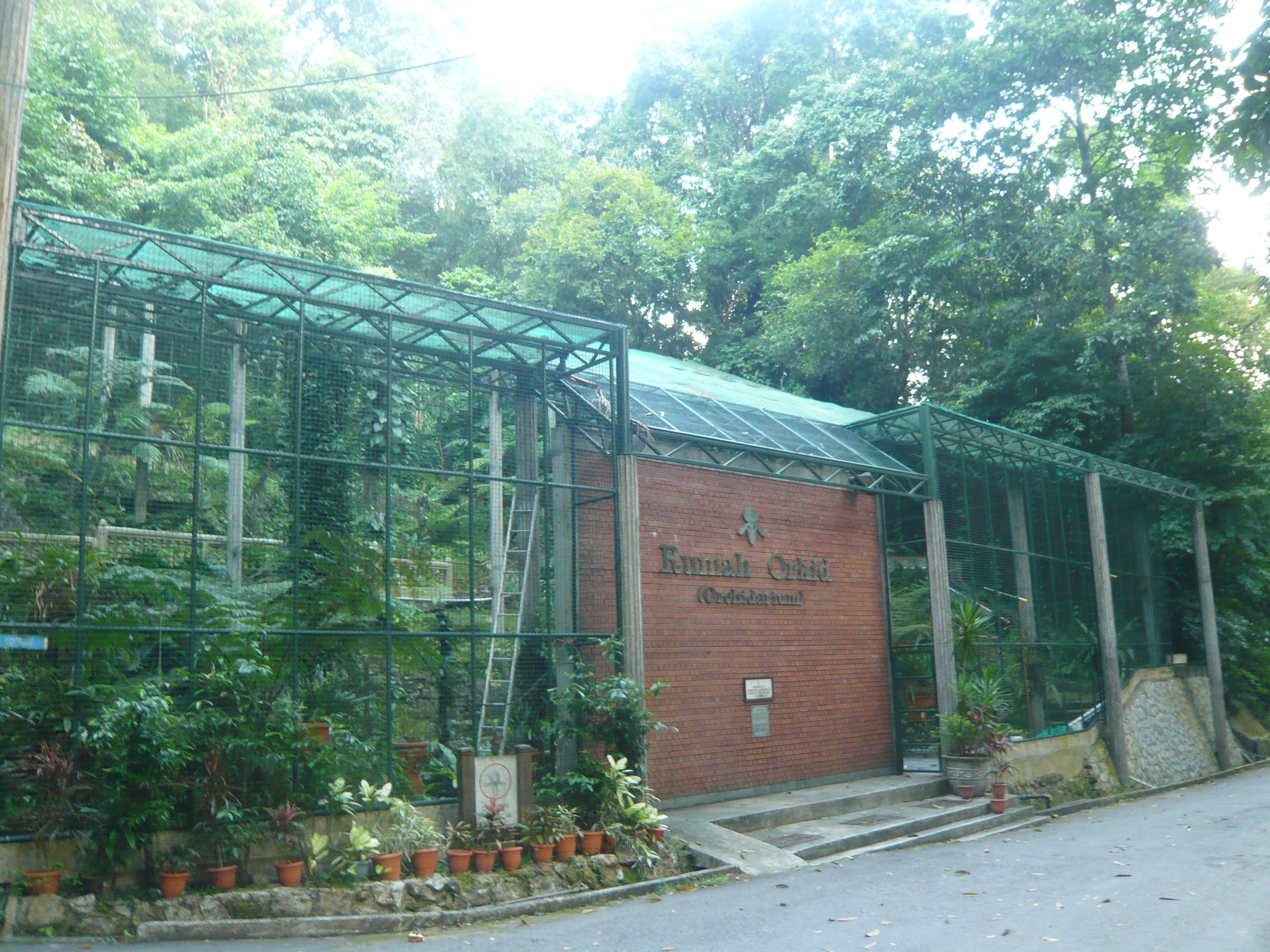
The orchidarium is nestled within the gardens

In 1910, the Gardens were threatened by a proposal to turn the valley in which they were located into a reservoir. The Gardens were handed over to the Municipality for this purpose, but the plan was abandoned and the gardens were returned to the Government in 1912. Only a small reservoir was eventually built, at the foot of the Waterfall.

During the period 1912 to 1921, much of the efforts of Curtis and his succeeding Superintendents was left to deteriorate. However, the herbarium collection increased and more time was directed to horticulture and botanical work. In subsequent years the garden matured and took on the visual aesthetic envisaged by Curtis. Several new structures and offices were added to the gardens but its overall structure, path and road configurations, the position and form of older plant houses, and the spatial layout of much of the plantings was little changed from Curtis’ original design.

Frederick Flippance, who was appointed assistant supervisor in 1921, was faced with the formidable task of relaying the gardens, in addition to his advisory role on roadside trees and other planting work in the municipal area. The work of the Gardens Department began to extend to ornamental planting of Georgetown, the Governor's Residence as well as the gardens themselves. A fine formal garden was established in 1936 in the Waterfall Gardens. Flippance remained Assistant Supervisor until 1937.

The Second World War took its toll on the Gardens. Although some of the Malay staff remained with the Gardens during the Japanese occupation, lack of funds and direction, together with the accumulation of war debris, left the Gardens in a very bad state. The Japanese excavated tunnels near the lily ponds and turned them into ammunition works and storage facilities, and a torpedo assembly station.

Upon British reoccupation in 1945, much restoration and cleaning up had to be done. As part of the post war reorganisation, the Penang Botanic Gardens was separated from its parent establishment in Singapore and, in 1946, the Gardens administration passed from Singapore to the Federation of Malay States. Whilst under the direction of Frederick Sydney Banfield, the Botanic Gardens were restored to their original splendour. In 1956, the first Malaysian — Cheang Kok Choy — was appointed as curator of Gardens, where he had previously worked as a trainee gardener. He continued to carry out the policy laid down by his predecessors until his retirement in 1976.

Today, the administration of the Gardens is the responsibility of the Penang State Government under the Pejabat Kebun Bunga (Penang Botanic Gardens Department).

== The Gardens today ==
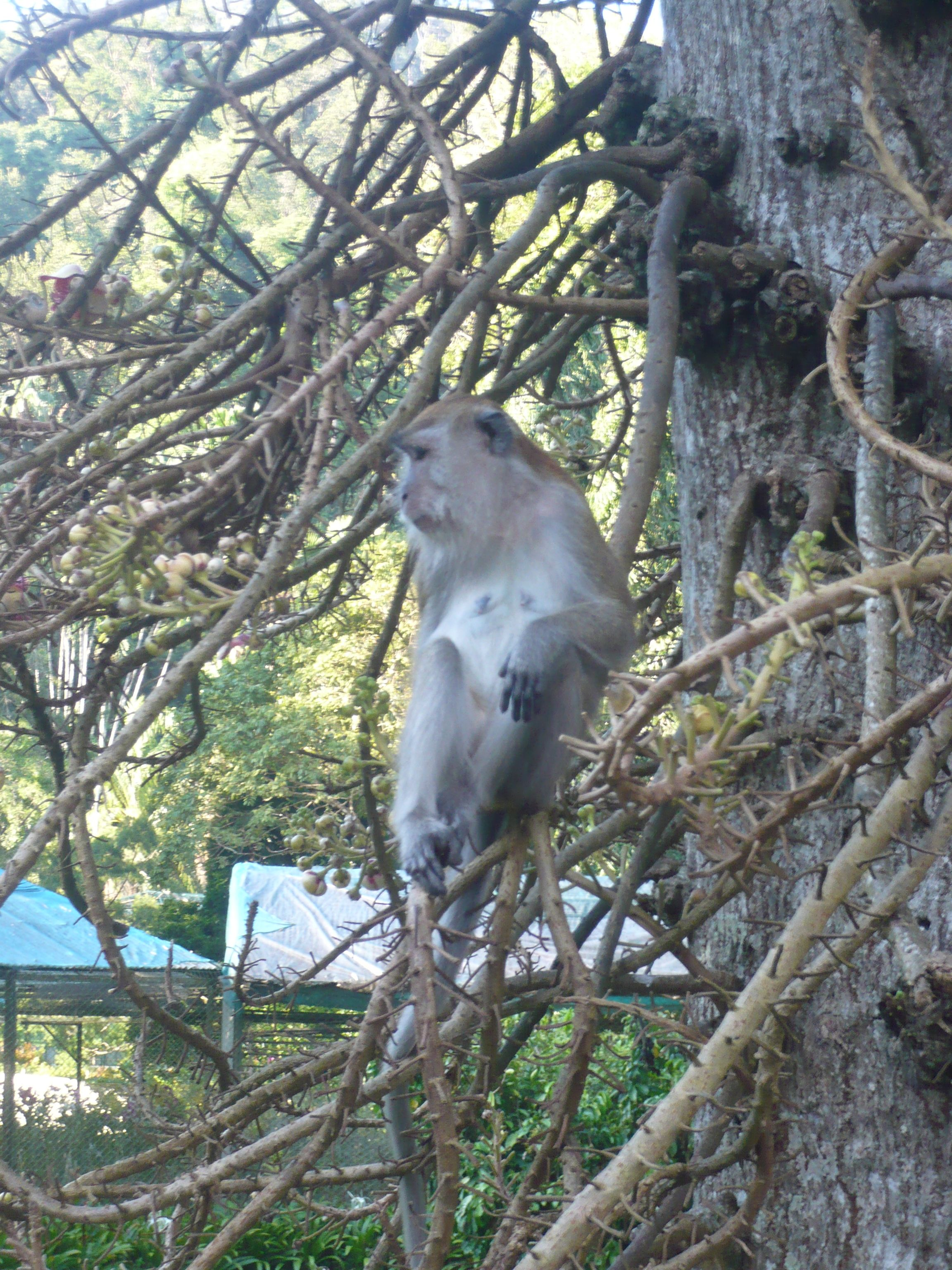
A monkey on the branches of a cannonball tree

After the handover to the Penang State Government, the Gardens gradually eroded their role in research and botanical activities. Consequently, most of the herbarium collections of Curtis and successive superintendents were transferred to the Singapore Botanic Gardens, since when the Penang Botanic Gardens function more as a park than as botanic gardens. The Gardens' main objectives include "conservation programmes, provision of a clean, safe and conducive public recreation environment, education and raising of public awareness in the appreciation of nature and gardening". The Gardens continue some research, collaborating with other Botanic Gardens in the development and implementation of botanical and ecological research programmes both nationally and internationally.

The Penang Botanic Gardens Department aims to provide visitors with programmes that focus on the historical and cultural heritage of the gardens, the plant collections, natural landscape and rich diversity of flora and fauna. It also aims to provide professional advice related to botany, taxonomy, horticulture and landscaping.

The gardens occupy a 29 ha. site in a valley described as "an amphitheatre of hills" covered with lush tropical rain-forests. Its lush greenery and tranquil setting makes it a favourite park and a popular tourist destination. It is Penang's unique natural heritage, being the only garden of its kind in Malaysia. As well as being a repository of flora and fauna, unique to the country and to the region, it serves as a "green lung" for metropolitan Penang. As such, the garden is a popular recreational spot; some of the recreational activities include jogging, walking, jungle trekking and aerobics.

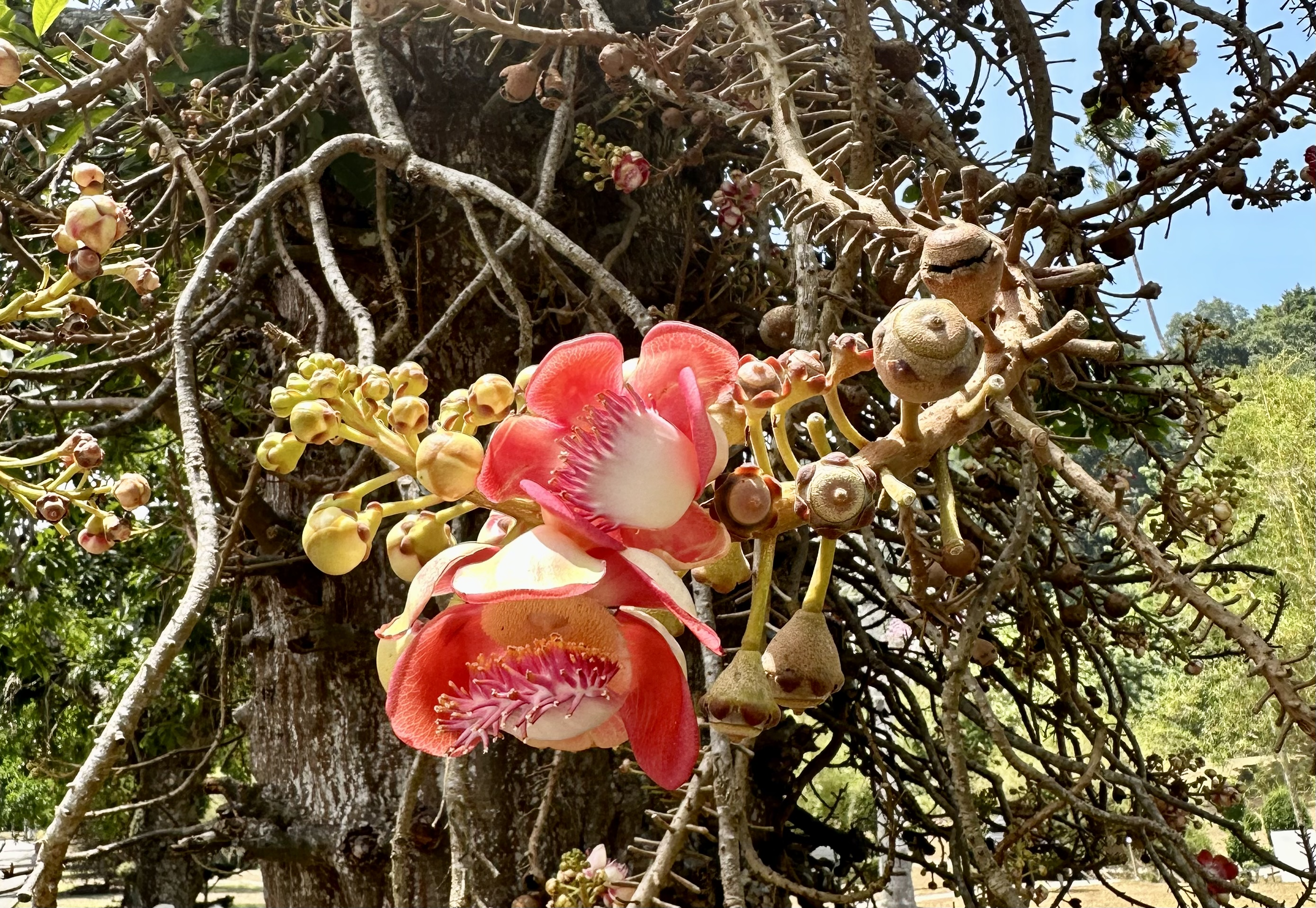
Couroupita guianensis, cannon ball tree flower buds and flower

Amongst the flora in the gardens, most conspicuous are the cannonball tree (Couroupita guianensis) and the large buttress roots of the sengkuang tree (Dracontomelon dao). There is also the pinang palm (Areca catechu) that lent its name to the island of Penang, and the black lily (Tacca integrifolia) with its unique purplish-black coloured flowers. The candle tree (Parmentiera cereifera), the endemic slipper orchid (Paphiopedilum barbatum) and the ginger, Geoctachys penangensis, can also be found in the gardens.

There are also collections of rare plant species housed in the Fern House, Palm Collection, Aroid Walkway, Orchidarium, Perdana Conservatory, Cactus House, Bromeliad and Begonia House, Herb Garden, Fern Rockery, Sun Rockery, and the Formal Garden.

The garden fauna include long-tailed macaques, dusky leaf monkeys, black giant squirrels as well as many insects and butterflies.

The path around the Lily Pond offers access to tropical rainforest, a short distance from the Botanic Gardens gate. The walk from the Lower Circular Road passes two prominent groups of palms and bamboo clusters along the Waterfall River. Two orchid houses provide a comparison between cultivated hybrids and wild orchid species. The best time to admire the flowering trees is during the dry season, from February to April, when the Thai bungor (Lagerstroemia loudonii), the Javanese cassia (Cassia javanica) and the rosy trumpet (Tabebuia rosea) are in full flower.

From the Lily Pond path there is a climb to the site of Charles Curtis' former house, although only a few bricks can still be seen. Various hiking paths lead from the Botanic Gardens, to Penang Hill and to Mount Olivia at the north. Mount Olivia was the site of the Raffles' home and was named after Raffles' wife, Olivia.

== Waterfall ==
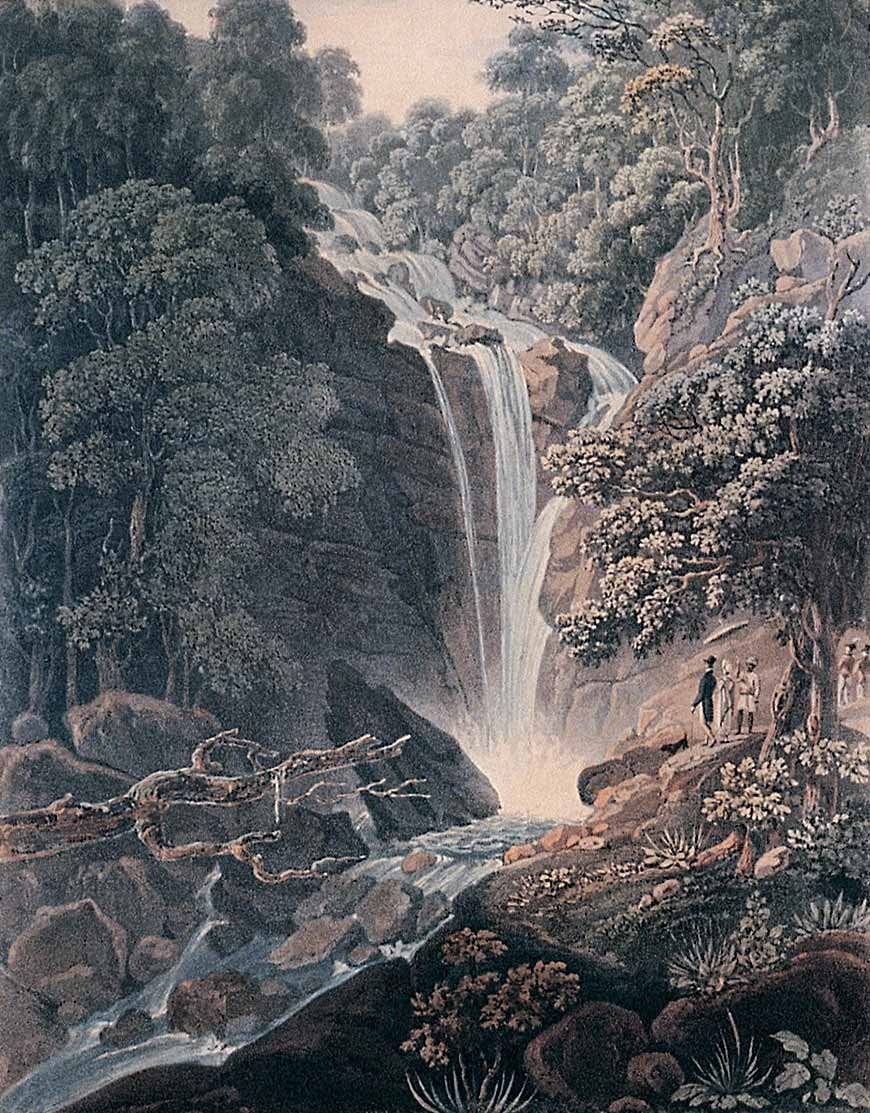
Aquatint of the 400ft Waterfall at Penang Botanic Gardens in 1818

The waterfall and reservoir are private property although they can be visited by arrangement with the Penang Water Authority (Perbadanan Bekalan Air Pulau Pinang). The Friends of the Penang Botanic Gardens, a non-governmental organisation, organises monthly visits to the waterfall. The Penang waterfall was closed off to the public as a safety measure during the confrontation between the newly independent Malaysia and Indonesia in the 1960s.

Early visitors to Penang Island described it as one of the key attractions of the island, including Ibrahim Munshi, son of Munshi Abdullah, who described it in his journal, the "Kisah Pelayaran". The waterfall was an important source of water for ships calling at Penang port in the early part of the 19th century. In 1804, the first water treatment plant in Malaysia was set up here, to supply the needs of 10,000 people in Penang. In 1805, an aqueduct was constructed to channel water from the fall via Pulau Tikus to a reservoir near the port. The quality of the water, filtered through the aged rocks of Penang Hill, was very high, and was described by the early sailors as "sweet".

The oval-shaped reservoir of the Penang Waterfall was constructed in the gardens in 1892 by British engineer James MacRitchie, who was also responsible for the expansion of MacRitchie Reservoir in Singapore. Around the time he was undertaking the expansion in Singapore, MacRitchie was invited by the Penang Municipal Commission in 1891 to review the options (and high cost tender results) for a proposed reservoir in Penang. He issued a report and recommended a reservoir at the waterfall. He also recommended the municipality acquire the right to draw water from Sungei Ayer Itam for the future. The Penang reservoir was reconstructed in 1950.

Today, only a small proportion of the Penang water supply comes from the waterfall reservoir — approximately 10–15% of the population obtain their water from here, while most of the island's water supply comes from Sungai Muda, on the border of Penang and Kedah.

== See also ==
- City Park (Youth Park)
- Sia Boey
- Penang Hill cable car
