= George Town Inner Ring Road =

Ring road in George Town, Penang, Malaysia

Route information
- Maintained by Penang Island City Council
- Length: 4.2 km (2.6 mi)

Major junctions
- Beltway around George Town
- North end: Gurney Drive
- Northam Road; Kelawei Road; Burmah Road; Macalister Road; Anson Road; Dato Keramat Road; Patani Road
- South end: Tun Dr Lim Chong Eu Expressway

Location
- Country: Malaysia
- Primary destinations: George Town Central Business District

Highway system
- Highways in Malaysia; Expressways; Federal; State

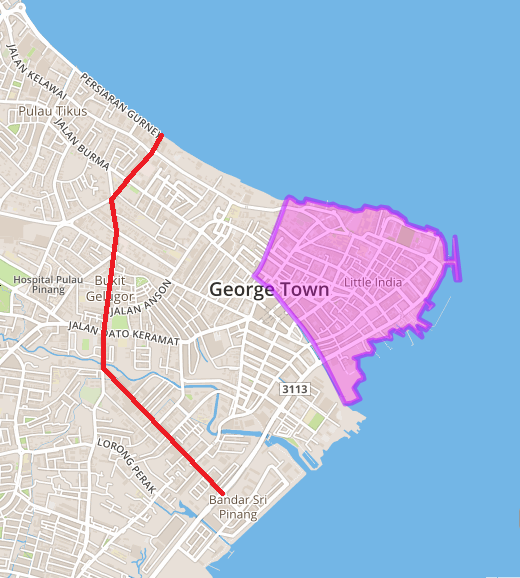

George Town Inner Ring Road is an urban ring road within the city of George Town in Penang, Malaysia. It comprises the eastern end of Gurney Drive, Jalan Pangkor, Jalan Perak and Jalan Sungai Pinang, forming a loop within the city centre.

The ring road serves to alleviate traffic congestion by acting as a bypass between the city's northern coastline and the Tun Dr Lim Chong Eu Expressway to the southeast. Whilst the ring road is presently formed by municipal roads, infrastructural plans have been drawn up to turn the roads into a proper expressway, including the construction of elevated bypasses and a tunnel.

== List of interchanges ==
| Interchange | To | Remarks |
|---|---|---|
Gurney Drive
| Northam/Kelawei | West; Kelawei Road; Pulau Tikus East; Northam Road; Farquhar Street (UNESCO World Heritage Site) | Junctions |
| Burmah | West; Burmah Road; Komtar East; Burmah Road; Pulau Tikus | Junctions |
| Peel Avenue | Southwest; Peel Avenue; Island Hospital East; Victoria Green | Junctions |
| Macalister | East; Macalister Road; Komtar Northwest; Macalister Road; Island Hospital Southwest; Barrack Road; Penang General Hospital | Junctions |
| Dato Keramat | East; Dato Keramat Road; Penang Times Square; Komtar West; Dato Keramat Road; City Stadium; Air Itam | Junctions |
| Patani | Northeast; Patani Road; Sungai Pinang; Northeast Penang Island District Police Headquarters | Junctions |
| Sungai Pinang | Northeast; River Road; Pinang River; Seven Streets Precinct | Junctions |
| Jelutong | Northeast; Bridge Street; Pinang River; Seven Streets Precinct Southwest; Jelutong Road; Jelutong | Junctions |
| Tun Dr Lim Chong Eu | Northeast Federal Route 3113 Tun Dr Lim Chong Eu Expressway; Weld Quay (UNESCO World Heritage Site); Ferry Terminal Southwest; Federal Route 3113 Tun Dr Lim Chong Eu Expressway; Bayan Lepas; Penang International Airport | Junctions |

== See also ==
- Tun Dr Lim Chong Eu Expressway
