= Sungai Pinang (disambiguation) =

Sungai Pinang is a neighbourhood in the city of George Town in Penang, Malaysia, named for the Pinang River (Sungai Pinang).

Sungai Pinang may also refer to:

- Sungai Pinang (Kelantan state constituency), a Malaysian state constituency now known as Kelaboran
- Sungai Pinang (Penang state constituency), Malaysia
- Bandar Baru Klang (state constituency), formerly known as Sungai Pinang, Selangor, Malaysia
- Sungai Pinang (Selangor state constituency), state constituency in Selangor, Malaysia 2004-2018
- Sungai Pinang, Samarinda, a district of Samarinda, East Kalimantan, Indonesia
