= M Mall O2O =

Shopping mall in George Town, Penang, Malaysia

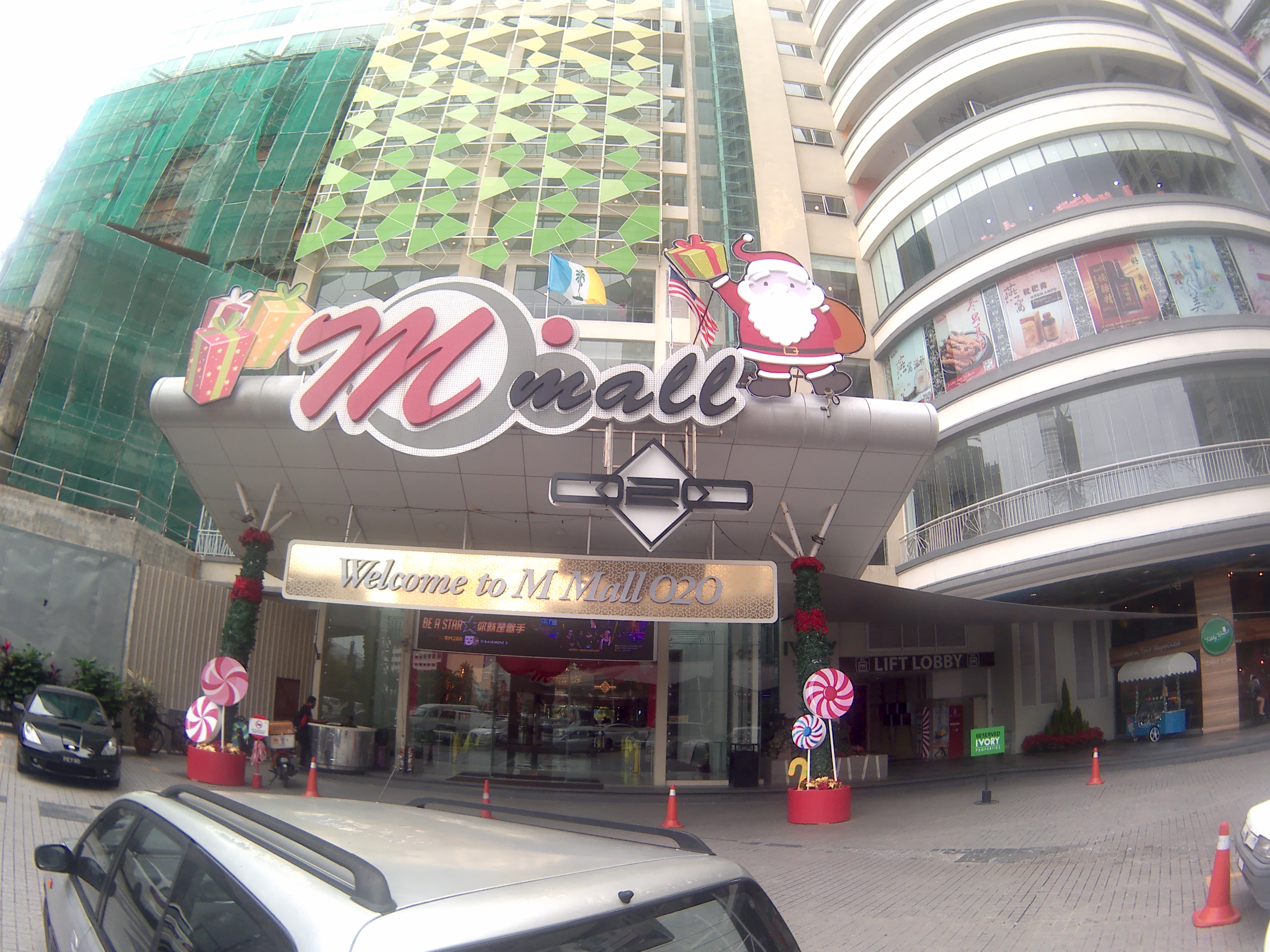
- Location: George Town, Penang, Malaysia
- Coordinates: 5.411723°N 100.326203°E
- Opened: 2015
- Owner: Ivory Properties Group
- Floor area: 353,317 sq ft (32,824.2 m^{2})
- Floors: 4
- Website: mmallo2o.com

M Mall O2O is a shopping mall in George Town, Penang, Malaysia. Opened in 2015, it forms part of the Penang Times Square at Dato Keramat Road.

The four-storey shopping mall contains decorations consisting of murals and replicas of Penang's famed landmarks and lifestyles. The retail floors include thematic areas, with each designed to replicate a different country. Additionally, the mall, with more than 500 retail outlets, is home to Penang's first wax museum.

Notably, M Mall O2O is the first shopping mall in Penang to introduce virtual currency as a payment mode. This has proved controversial, however, leading to a police raid on the mall in 2017.

== History ==
M Mall O2O, which was opened to the public in 2015, constitutes Phase 2 of the Penang Times Square, a major urban redevelopment project currently being undertaken by Ivory Properties Group.

The shopping centre, which includes MBI International Sdn Bhd as its tenants, is the first in Penang to implement the use of virtual currency as an alternative payment method. This concept allows shoppers to utilise 'points' online in exchange for services or products within the mall.

While this novel concept has attracted customers from abroad, particularly China, the use of virtual currency has raised suspicions of investment fraud. Consequently, in 2017, the Royal Malaysian Police and government officials raided the shopping mall as part of a nationwide investigation on illegal investment schemes.

== Entertainment ==
M Mall O2O is home to Penang's first wax museum, which contains a collection of wax sculptures of prominent figures, including Queen Elizabeth II and Barack Obama. In addition, an amusement centre for children is available within the mall's top floor.

Parts of the shopping mall are designed to replicate sceneries in different countries, such as the United Kingdom, South Korea and Thailand. Other interior decorations include murals depicting Penang's lifestyles and a large-scale replica of the Penang Bridge.

== See also ==
- List of shopping malls in Malaysia
