= Bandar Klang (state constituency) =

Selangor constituency

Defunct state constituency
- Legislature: Selangor State Legislative Assembly
- Constituency created: 1974
- Constituency abolished: 2004
- First contested: 1974
- Last contested: 1999

Bandar Klang was a state constituency in Selangor, Malaysia, that was represented in the Selangor State Legislative Assembly from 1974 to 2004.

The state constituency was created in the 1974 redistribution and was mandated to return a single member to the Selangor State Legislative Assembly under the first past the post voting system.

== History ==
It was abolished in 2004 when it was redistributed.

=== Representation history ===
Members of the Legislative Assembly for Bandar Klang
Assembly	No	Years	Member	Party
Constituency created from Jeram, Bukit Raja, Sementa Port Swettenham and Kampong Jawa
Bandar Kelang
4th	N23	1974-1978	Tong Kok Mau (童國模)	BN (MCA)
5th	N23	1978-1982	Tong Kok Mau (童國模)	BN (MCA)
6th	N23	1982-1986	Tan Seng Giaw (陳勝堯)	DAP
Klang Bandar
7th	N34	1986-1990	Tan Seng Giaw (陳勝堯)	DAP
8th	N34	1990-1995	Chua Kow Eng (蔡高英)	GR (DAP)
Bandar Klang
9th	N41	1995-1999	Chua Kow Eng (蔡高英)	DAP
10th	N41	1999-2004	Teng Chang Khim (鄧章欽)	BA (DAP)
Constituency abolished, renamed to Sungai Pinang

== Election results ==
Selangor state election, 1999
Party	Candidate	Votes	%	∆%
DAP	Teng Chang Khim	13,927	49.73	▼0.19
BN	Tan Chee Keong	13,482	48.14	▼1.25
MDP	Chua Kok Eng	599	2.14	▲2.14
Total valid votes		28,008	100.00	
Total rejected ballots		437		
Unreturned ballots		56		
Turnout		28,501	71.82	▲0.42
Registered electors		39,685		
Majority		445	1.59	▲1.06
DAP hold		Swing		

Selangor state election, 1995
Party	Candidate	Votes	%	∆%
DAP	Chua Kow Eng	13,606	49.92	▼18.06
BN	Ang Thye Chin	13,461	49.39	▲17.37
Independent	Pupalan Muthusamy	188	0.69	▲0.69
Total valid votes		27,255	100.00	
Total rejected ballots		404		
Unreturned ballots		61		
Turnout		27,720	71.40	▼2.16
Registered electors		38,824		
Majority		145	0.53	▼35.42
DAP hold		Swing		

Selangor state election, 1990: Klang Bandar
Party	Candidate	Votes	%	∆%
DAP	Chua Kow Eng	13,658	67.98	▲6.21
BN	Ang Thye Chin	6,434	32.02	▼0.41
Total valid votes		20,092	100.00	
Total rejected ballots		329		
Unreturned ballots		34		
Turnout		20,455	73.56	▲1.68
Registered electors		27,809		
Majority		7,224	35.95	▲6.61
DAP hold		Swing		

Selangor state election, 1986: Klang Bandar
Party	Candidate	Votes	%	∆%
DAP	Tan Seng Giaw	13,223	61.77	▲9.46
BN	Goon Swee Fook	6,942	32.43	▲32.43
NASMA	Yeoh Lai Seng	927	4.33	▲4.33
SDP	Yeoh Poh San	314	1.47	▲1.47
Total valid votes		21,406	100.00	
Total rejected ballots		397		
Unreturned ballots		0		
Turnout		21,803	71.88	▲1.03
Registered electors		30,333		
Majority		6,281	29.34	▲24.71
DAP hold		Swing		

Selangor state election, 1982: Bandar Kelang
Party	Candidate	Votes	%	∆%
DAP	Tan Seng Giaw	18,075	58.49	
BN	Tong Kok Mau	12,830	41.51	
Total valid votes		26,905	100.00	
Total rejected ballots		446		
Unreturned ballots		0		
Turnout		27,351	70.85	
Registered electors		38,602		
Majority		1,245	4.63	
DAP gain from BN		Swing		?

Selangor state election, 1978: Bandar Kelang
Party	Candidate	Votes	%	∆%
On the nomination day, Tong Kok Mau won uncontested.
BN	Tong Kok Mau			
Total valid votes			100.00	
Total rejected ballots				
Unreturned ballots				
Turnout				
Registered electors				
Majority				
BN hold		Swing		

Selangor state election, 1974: Bandar Kelang
Party	Candidate	Votes	%
BN	Tong Kok Mau	5,084	38.13
Independent	Wong Tai Moi	4,836	36.27
DAP	Chan Kok Kit	3,109	23.32
PEKEMAS	Tai Sen Sart	303	2.27
Total valid votes		13,332	100.00
Total rejected ballots		656	
Unreturned ballots		0	
Turnout		13,988	69.33
Registered electors		20,175	
Majority		248	1.86
This was a new constituency created.
