= GAMA Supermarket & Departmental Store =

Department store in George Town, Penang, Malaysia

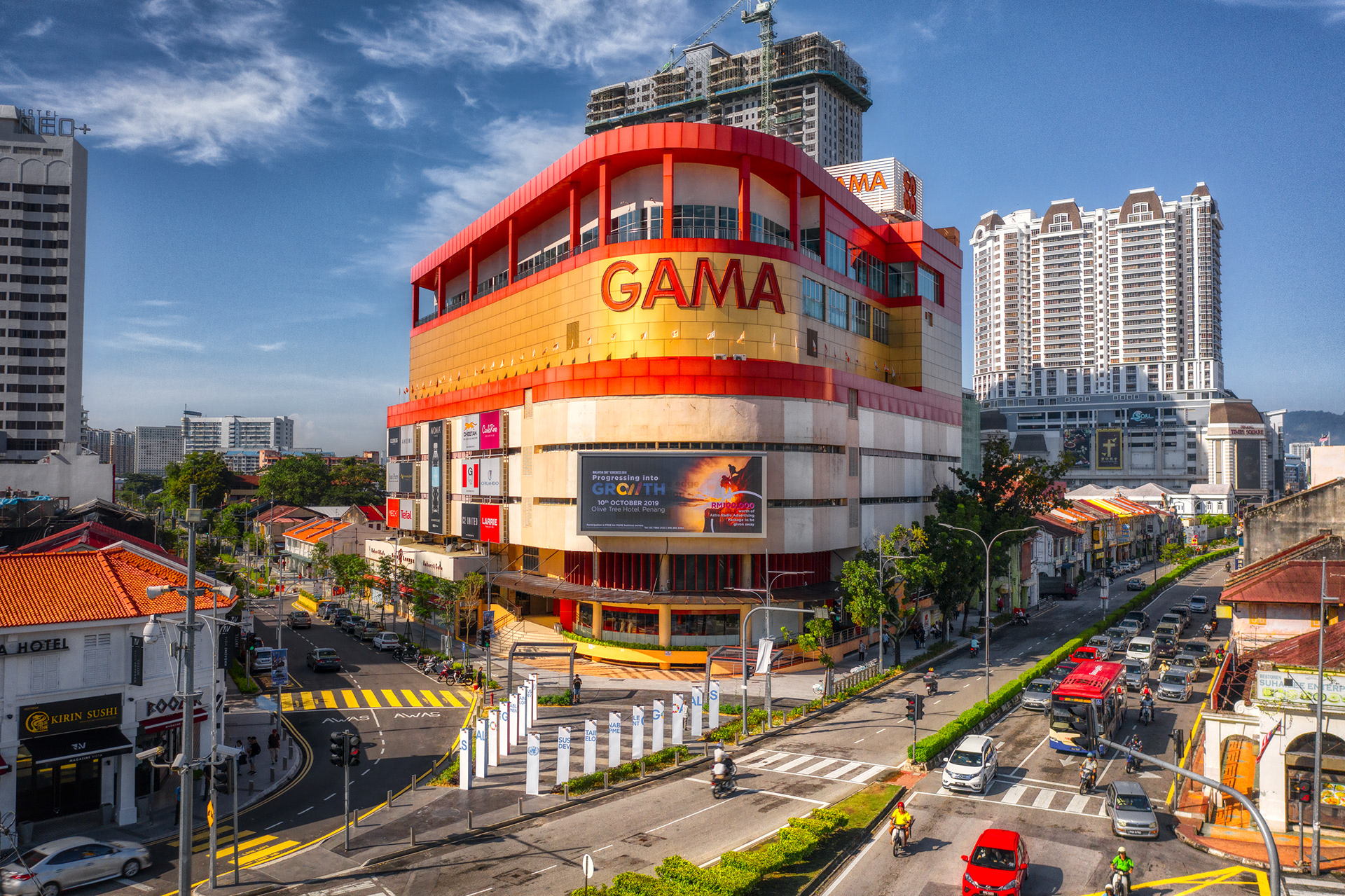
- Location: George Town, Penang, Malaysia
- Coordinates: 5.413755°N 100.328265°E
- Opened: 1967
- Floors: 8
- Website: shop.gama.com.my

GAMA is a department store within George Town in the Malaysian state of Penang. Located at Dato Keramat Road within the city's Central Business District (CBD), GAMA was opened in 1967, making it the oldest department store in the Penang. In spite of competition from the nearby shopping malls, the department store still retains its customer base due to its cheaper pricing. The shopping centre contains a total of eight floors, including its basement parking lot.

== History ==
GAMA was originally founded as the Pulau Pinang Supermarket by Mr Chang Cheng Guan, Mr Chia Siak Leng and Mr Tan Peck Yon. Mr Chang Cheng Guan is a Kedah-born entrepreneur who had been impressed by Singapore's booming retail scene at the time Mr Chia Siak Leng and Mr Tan Peck Yong were both Singapore-born entrepreneurs who had the vision for importing goods from China when it wasn't popular at the time. Launched in 1967, the supermarket was initially located at Penang Road, adjacent to the famous Chowrasta Market.

The supermarket was then relocated in 1980 to its present location at Dato Keramat Road, which was formerly the site of a government gunpowder depot. Concurrently, the supermarket was renamed as GAMA. At the time of its opening, GAMA was the largest shopping centre in Penang.

== Retail outlets ==
The supermarket and department store is divided into eight floors, with each floor containing separate retail categories. The basement level is the parking lot. For groceries can be found in ground floor. For instance, apparel and accessories can be found at the first, second, third and fourth floors, while home appliances are offered at the fifth floor & sixth floor. Seventh floor is the new renovation food court.

== Location ==
GAMA is situated in the centre of George Town, directly opposite Komtar, the administrative centre of Penang. It is sited at the intersection of Dato Keramat Road and Brick Kiln Road (now Gurdwara Road). Rapid Penang bus routes include a stop at the department store. Due to GAMA's proximity to Komtar, the department store can also be accessed from Komtar on foot.

== See also ==
- List of shopping malls in Malaysia
