= Bukit Dumbar =

- Neighbourhood of George Town
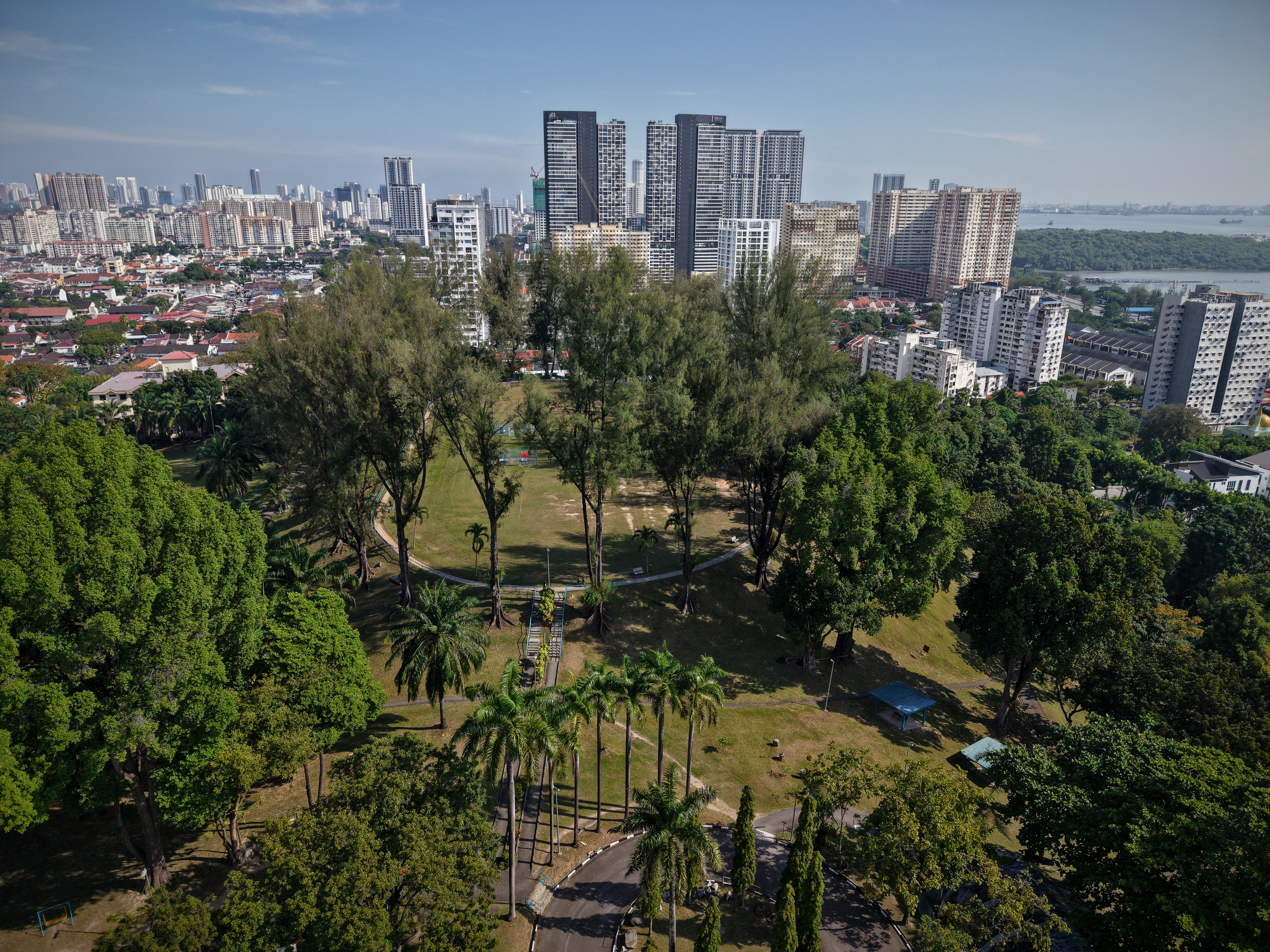
- Interactive map of Bukit Dumbar
- Location within George Town in Penang
- Coordinates: 5°22′58.38″N 100°18′42.91″E
- Country: Malaysia
- State: Penang
- City: George Town
- District: Northeast
- Time zone: UTC+8 (MST)
  - Summer (DST): Not observed
- Postal code: 11600

Bukit Dumbar is a residential neighbourhood within the city of George Town in the Malaysian state of Penang. Located 4 km (2.5 mi) south of the city centre, it lies within the suburb of Jelutong. Formerly an agricultural estate, Bukit Dumbar is the site of an underground reservoir complex that supplies water to the southern half of George Town.

== History ==
By the late 19th century, Bukit Dumbar became part of the Udini Estate, a 19-acre (7.7 ha) coconut plantation. During the Japanese occupation of Penang, Japanese military police conducted the Sook Ching purges that targeted the ethnic Chinese community. Victims were buried in mass graves across Penang Island, including at Bukit Dumbar.

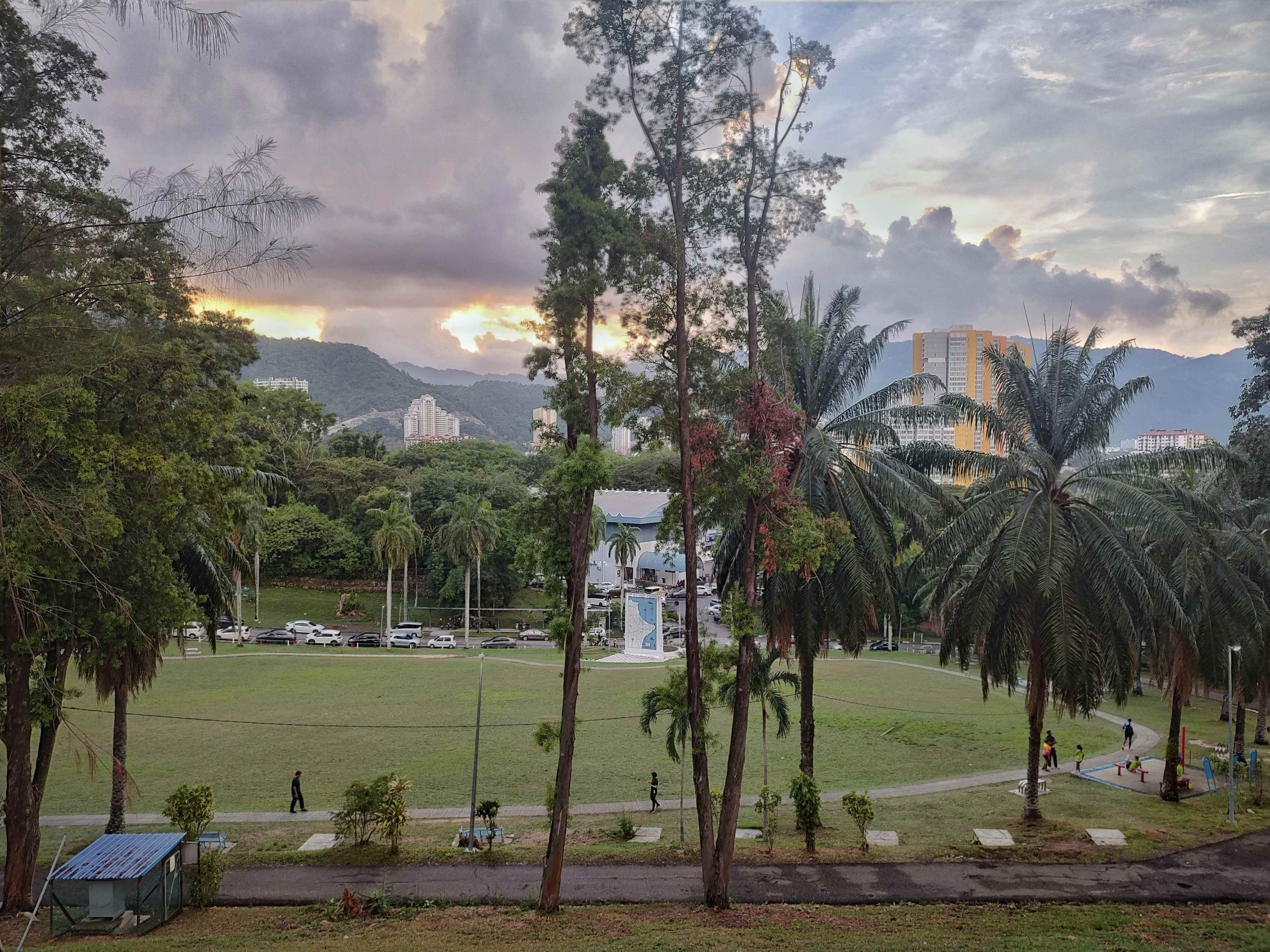
Bukit Dumbar lawn and map of George Town from the top of the reservoir at sunset

In the years following World War II, there was growing concern about water sufficiency in George Town. New sources of raw water were explored, leading to the construction of two underground reservoirs at Bukit Dumbar by 1958 with a combined capacity of 8,000,000 imp gal (36,000,000 L; 9,600,000 US gal). A 20-acre (8.1 ha) public park was created 150 ft (46 m) above sea level, on top of the reservoir complex that supports the southern parts of George Town, such as Gelugor, Bayan Lepas, Relau, Teluk Kumbar, Gertak Sanggul and Balik Pulau. By 2018, two additional reservoirs were added to the complex, bringing the total capacity to 162,000,000 L (36,000,000 imp gal; 43,000,000 US gal).

In 1987, the Penang Water Supply Corporation opened a squash training centre at Bukit Dumbar. The centre has since produced some of Malaysia's top squash players, including Nicol David and Low Wee Wern. In acknowledgment of Nicol David's accomplishments, the facility was renamed the Nicol David International Squash Centre by the Penang state government in 2010.
