= Quah Perng Fei =

Malaysian politician and medical doctor

Yang Berhormat Quah Perng Fei MLA
- 柯鹏飞

Member of the Selangor State Legislative Assembly for Bandar Baru Klang
- Incumbent
- Assumed office 12 August 2023
- Preceded by: Teng Chang Khim (PH–DAP)
- Majority: 45,672 (2023)

Personal details
- Born: Quah Perng Fei; 19 August 1974 (age 51) Kedah, Malaysia
- Citizenship: Malaysian
- Party: Democratic Action Party (DAP) (since 2007)
- Other political affiliations: Pakatan Rakyat (PR) (2008–2015); Pakatan Harapan (PH) (since 2015)
- Education: University of the West Indies at St. Augustine
- Occupation: Politician
- Profession: Medical doctor

Quah Perng Fei

Chinese name
- Traditional Chinese: 柯鵬飛
- Simplified Chinese: 柯鹏飞
Transcriptions
Standard Mandarin
- Hanyu Pinyin: Kē Péngfēi

Quah Perng Fei (simplified Chinese: 柯鹏飞; traditional Chinese: 柯鵬飛; pinyin: Kē Péngfēi; born 19 August 1974) is a Malaysian politician and medical doctor who has served as Member of the Selangor State Legislative Assembly (MLA) for Bandar Baru Klang since August 2023. He is a member, State Committee Member of Selangor and Branch Chairman of North Klang of the Democratic Action Party (DAP), a component party of the Pakatan Harapan (PH) and formerly Pakatan Rakyat (PR) coalitions. He also served as the Member of the Klang Municipal Council (MPK) from January 2021 to his resignation in July 2023.

== Early life and education ==
Quah was born in Kedah, Malaysia in 1974 and was raised in Taman Eng Ann, Klang. He has been there since he was 8 except going abroad for studies and work. He furthered his studies in the medical field in the University of the West Indies at St. Augustine in Trinidad and Tobago.

== Medical doctor career ==
Quah has been a medical doctor for more than 20 years and been running two clinics in Klang prior to becoming an MLA. He opened a clinic in Klang in 2003. During his time as a medical doctor, patients that came to his clinic to meet him and reflect various issues facing Klang to him. He said the reason he decided to contest is his experience as a medical doctor that can bring forward good suggestions and proposals to the Selangor State Legislative Assembly which will benefit the people if they are implemented. He also believed that his tenure as a Member of MPK is the reason he was nominated by PH and his advantage in the election.

== Political career ==
Quah joined DAP in 2007.

=== Member of the Klang Municipal Council (2021–2023) ===
Quah was appointed a Member of MPK for Klang Utama, Bandar Bukit Raja, Taman Mutiara 1 and 2 in January 2021. He resigned from the position on 27 July 2023 to contest the 2023 Selangor state election. Upon his resignation, he also thanked President Noraini Roslan, employees and fellow members of MPK for their support. During his tenure in MPK, he has handled various issues related to basic amenities that dealt with the departments and other local authorities of MPK. He also described it as a sharp learning curve and a good experience for him. He also hoped that his involvement as an MPK Member would put him in a better position to serve the rakyat should he be elected as the Bandar Baru Klang MLA.

=== Member of the Selangor State Legislative Assembly (since 2023) ===
==== 2023 Selangor state election ====
In the 2023 Selangor state election, Quah made his electoral debut after being nominated by PH and outgoing Member of the Selangor State Executive Council (EXCO) and Bandar Baru Klang MLA Teng Chang Khim to contest the Bandar Baru Klang state seat. Quah won the seat and was elected to the Selangor State Legislative Assembly as the Bandar Baru Klang MLA after defeating Tan Seng Huat of Perikatan Nasional (PN) by a majority of 45,672 votes.

As the Bandar Baru Klang MLA, Quah promised to work with the Member of Parliament (MP) for Klang Ganabatirau Veraman to raise the quality of infrastructure in Klang improve the welfare of the Klang people through the welfare programmes introduced by the state government of Selangor after the people suffered economic decline brought by the COVID-19 pandemic and inflation. He dreamed to integrate the family medical services in Selangor and establish it as a medical frontline of the state government to screen for mild and severe diseases. He has also pledged to address the floods in Klang with the cooperation of state and federal governments. He also wanted to promote his election campaign manifesto and visit the young voters face-to-face to garner their support. He also highlighted that he would seek advice from his predecessor as the Bandar Baru Klang MLA Teng who was a popular and well-liked veteran and carry on his spirit of service. He would also convert the pressure to motivation to move forward in case he was compared to Teng.

== Election results ==
Selangor State Legislative Assembly
Year	Constituency	Candidate	Votes	Pct	Opponent(s)	Votes	Pct	Ballots cast	Majority	Turnout
2023	N45 Bandar Baru Klang	Quah Perng Fei (DAP)	53,658	87.04%	Tan Seng Huat (Gerakan)	7,986	12.96%	61,644	45,672	74.43%
