= Jelutong, Penang =

Jelutong
- Suburb of George Town
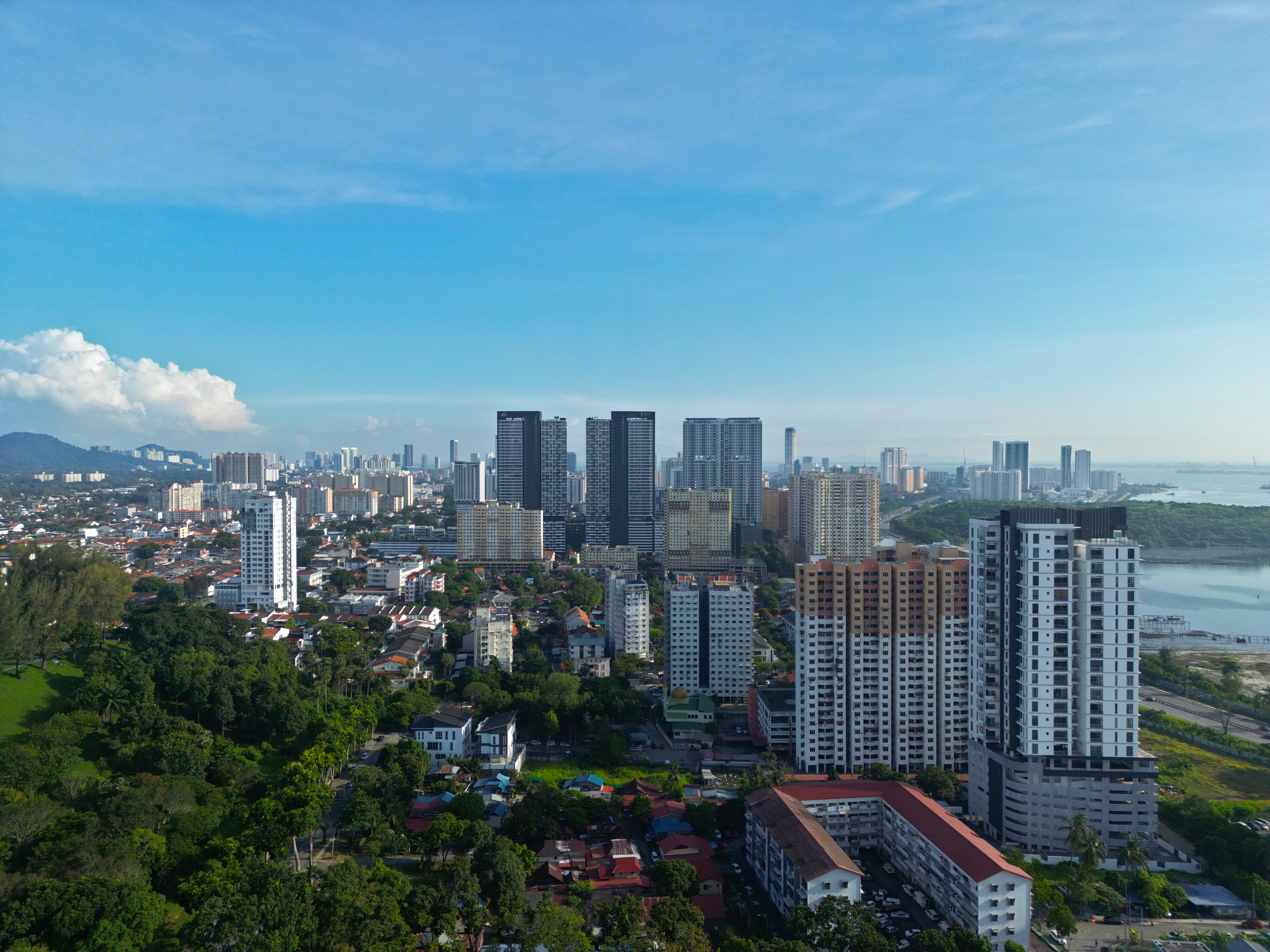
- Interactive map of Jelutong
- Location within George Town in Penang
- Coordinates: 5°23′25.7″N 100°18′46.9″E
- Country: Malaysia
- State: Penang
- City: George Town
- District: Northeast

Area
  - Total: 4.4 km^{2} (1.7 sq mi)

Population (2020)
  - Total: 63,507
  - Density: 14,000/km^{2} (37,000/sq mi)

Demographics
  - Ethnic groups: 70.0% Chinese; 18.6% Bumiputera; 18.2% Malay; 0.4% indigenous groups from Sabah and Sarawak; 8.0% Indian; 0.9% Other ethnicities; 2.5% Non-citizens
- Time zone: UTC+8 (MST)
  - Summer (DST): Not observed
- Postal code: 11600

Jelutong is a suburb of George Town in the Malaysian state of Penang. Located 3.2 km (2.0 mi) south of the city centre, Jelutong has been inhabited since as early as the late 18th century, when traders from Aceh and India settled around the area.

It was once notorious as a turf for gangsters and triads until the 1980s, when urbanisation transformed the area into a residential suburb of George Town.

== Etymology ==
Jelutong was named after the Jelutong tree, known scientifically as Dyera costulata. It was believed that this species of trees was once abundant around the area now known as Jelutong.

== History ==
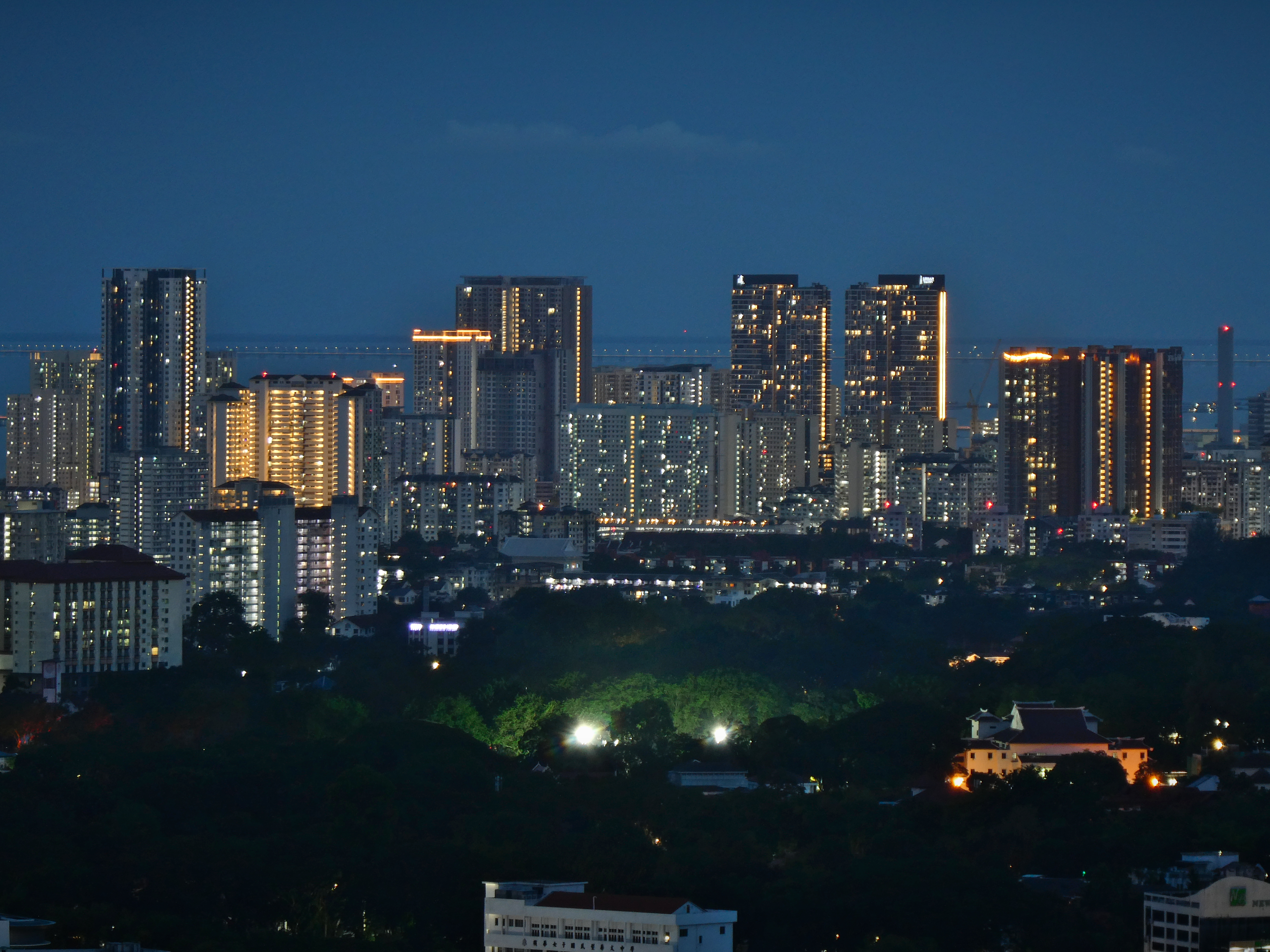
Residential high-rises at Jelutong, which had a population density of 14,433/km^{2} (37,380/sq mi) as of 2020, the highest in George Town.

Jelutong was already inhabited before the arrival of Captain Francis Light in 1786. Merchants from Aceh and India established resting places and villages along the mouth of Pinang River.

In the mid-19th century, the then forested area was first cleared for agricultural purposes. Factories were set up much later in Jelutong, as the urban population spilled southward from the city centre. In spite of industrialisation, some fishing communities continued to exist up until recently and charcoal makers still make a living from the mangrove swamps along the coast.

The growing population in Jelutong led to rampant crime and thugs roaming the streets. It was only in the 1980s with a rise in the standards of living and urbanisation that Jelutong's criminal notoriety was eradicated.

It was in the Jelutong parliamentary constituency where Karpal Singh, a prominent Malaysian lawyer, first entered the national political scene. The Democratic Action Party politician held the seat for over 20 years until 1999, earning him the nickname the 'Tiger of Jelutong'.

== Geography ==
Map of Jelutong.
Click link at the top right corner to zoom in.
1 Jelutong Market
2 Bukit Dumbar
3 Batu Lanchang
4 Lam Wah Ee Hospital
5 RECSAM
6 Lotus's Jelutong
7 e-Gate
8 Sunshine Jelutong
9 Udini Square
10 Grace Residence
11 Skyview Residence

== Demographics ==
Ethnicities within Jelutong in 2020
Ethnicities / Nationality	Percentage
Chinese	70.0%
Malays	18.2%
Other Bumiputeras	0.4%
Indians	8.0%
Others	0.9%
Non-Malaysians	2.5%

As of 2020, Jelutong was home to a population of 63,507. With a population density of 14,433/km^{2} (37,380/sq mi), the suburb was the most densely populated area in the city of George Town. Ethnic Chinese constituted 70% of Jelutong's population, followed by Malays at 18% and Indians at 8%.

== Transportation ==
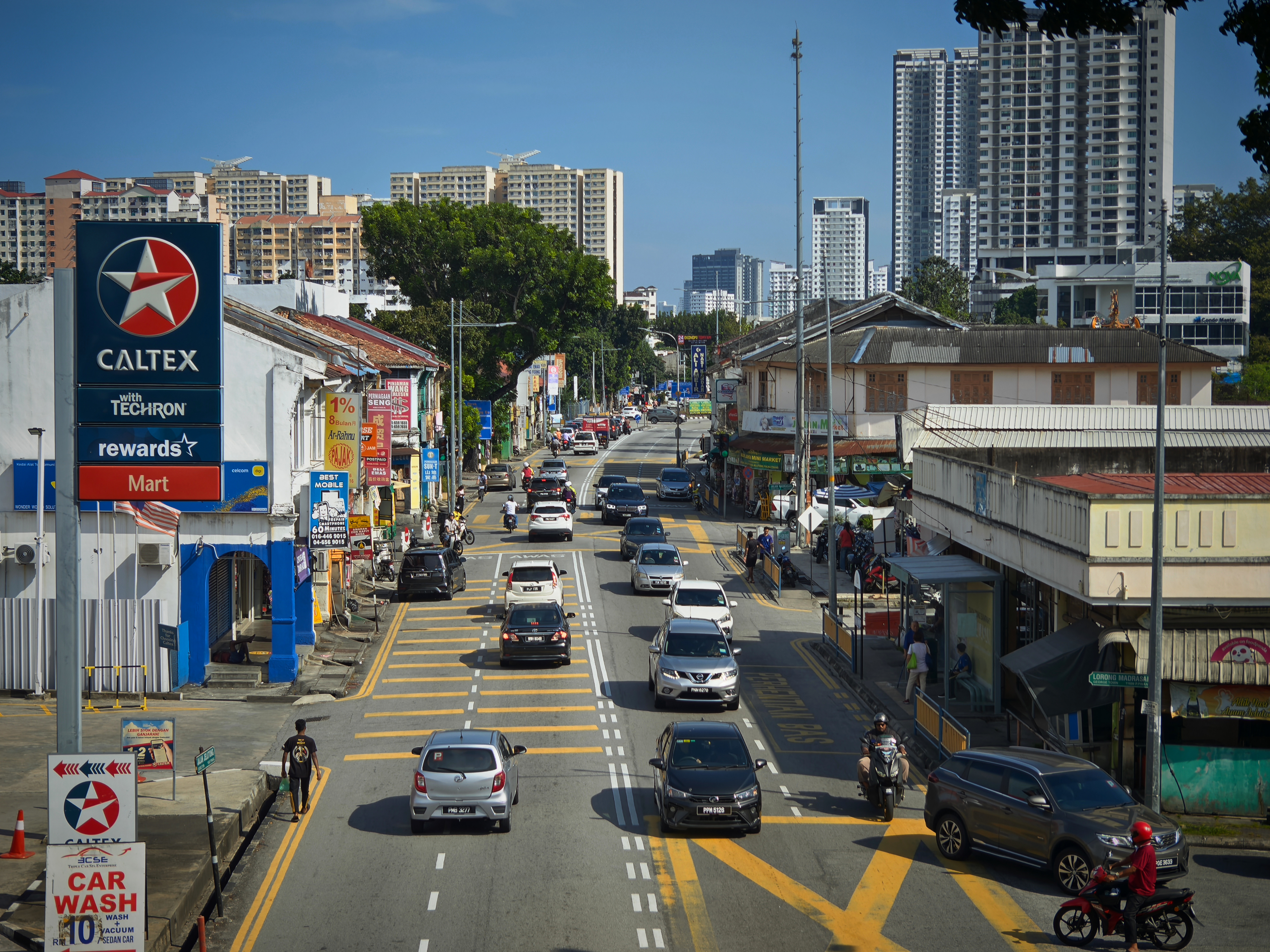
Jelutong Road

Historically, Jelutong Road serves as the main thoroughfare within the suburb, allowing motorists from the city centre to head south towards Bayan Lepas. In recent years, the completion of the Tun Dr Lim Chong Eu Expressway has considerably reduced the daily traffic congestion along Jelutong Road, as motorists now use the coastal expressway to commute between the city centre and Bayan Lepas, bypassing Jelutong Road entirely.

Rapid Penang buses 11, 12, 301, 302, 303 and 401 serve the residents of the suburb, by connecting Jelutong with the city centre and other destinations to the south, including Bukit Jambul, Bayan Baru, Bayan Lepas, Batu Maung and Balik Pulau.

== Education ==
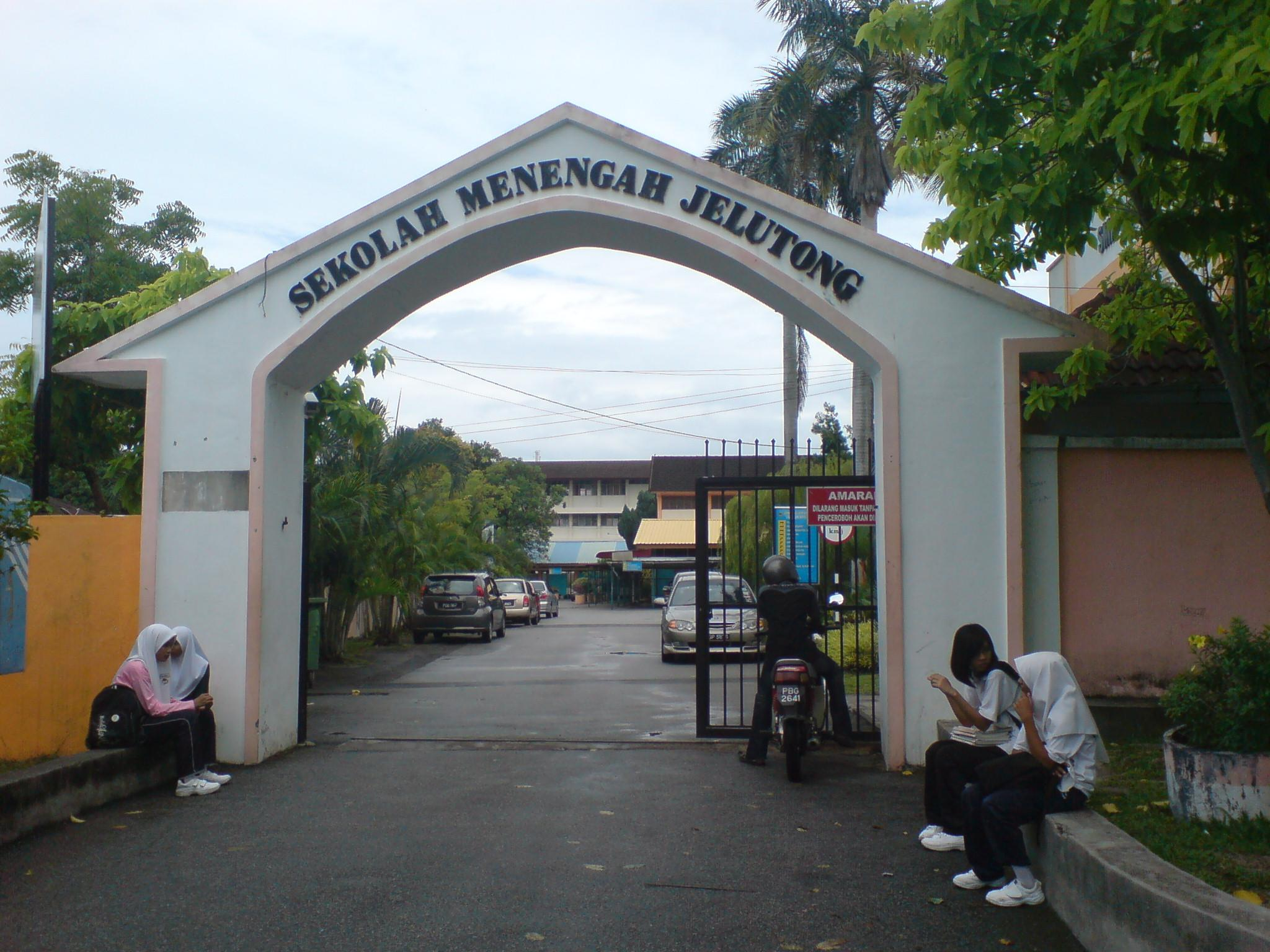
SMK Jelutong, a national high school at Taman Jelutong.

A total of four primary schools and one high school are located within Jelutong. The suburb is also home to the headquarters of RECSAM, an educational institute affiliated with the Southeast Asian Ministers of Education Organization.

Primary schools

- SJK (C) Jelutong
- SJK (C) Phei Shin
- SK Jelutong
- SK Jelutong Barat

High school

- SMK Jelutong

== Sports ==
The Nicol David International Squash Centre, located at Bukit Dumbar, was previously known as the Bukit Dumbar Sports Centre. It was here where Nicol David, a top international squash player, was first trained at a young age.
