= Teng Chang Khim =

Malaysian politician and lawyer

Yang Berbahagia Dato' Teng Chang Khim DPMS
- 邓章钦

Senior Member of the Selangor State Executive Council
- In office 19 May 2018 – 21 August 2023
- Monarch: Sharafuddin
- Menteri Besar: Amirudin Shari
- Portfolio: Investment, Industry, Trade and Small–Medium Industries
- Preceded by: Portfolio established (Investment); Himself (Industry and Trade, Small and Medium Industries)
- Succeeded by: Portfolio obolished (Investment); Ng Sze Han (Investment, Trade & SME)
- Constituency: Bandar Baru Klang
- In office 2018 – 18 May 2018
- Monarch: Sharafuddin
- Menteri Besar: Azmin Ali
- Portfolio: Industry and Trade, Small and Medium Industries
- Preceded by: Himself
- Succeeded by: Himself
- Constituency: Bandar Baru Klang
- In office 27 September 2014 – 13 May 2018
- Monarch: Sharafuddin
- Menteri Besar: Azmin Ali
- Portfolio: Investment, Industry, Small–Medium Industries, Trade and Transport
- Preceded by: Portfolio established
- Succeeded by: Himself (Industry and Trade, Small and Medium Industries); Ng Sze Han (Public Transport)
- Constituency: Sungai Pinang
- In office 30 May 2013 – 26 September 2014
- Monarch: Sharafuddin
- Menteri Besar: Khalid Ibrahim (2013–2014)
- Portfolio: Local Government, Studies and Research
- Preceded by: Ronnie Liu Tian Khiew
- Succeeded by: Portfolio abolished
- Constituency: Sungai Pinang

9th Speaker of the Selangor State Legislative Assembly
- In office 22 April 2008 – 30 May 2013
- Monarch: Sharafuddin
- Deputy: Haniza Mohamed Talha
- Menteri Besar: Abdul Khalid Ibrahim
- Preceded by: Onn Ismail
- Succeeded by: Hannah Yeoh Tseow Suan
- Constituency: Sungai Pinang

Member of the Selangor State Legislative Assembly for Bandar Baru Klang
- In office 9 May 2018 – 12 August 2023
- Preceded by: Position established
- Succeeded by: Quah Perng Fei (PH–DAP)
- Majority: 39,828 (2018)

Member of the Selangor State Legislative Assembly for Sungai Pinang
- In office 21 March 2004 – 9 May 2018
- Preceded by: Position established
- Succeeded by: Position abolished
- Majority: 3,613 (2004); 7,361 (2008); 11,309 (2013)

Member of the Selangor State Legislative Assembly for Bandar Klang
- In office 29 November 1999 – 21 March 2004
- Preceded by: Chua Kow Eng (DAP)
- Succeeded by: Position abolished
- Majority: 445 (1999)

Member of the Selangor State Legislative Assembly for Bukit Gasing
- In office 25 April 1995 – 29 November 1999
- Preceded by: Teong Shyan Chyuan (DAP)
- Succeeded by: Lim Thuang Seng (BN–Gerakan)
- Majority: 1,290 (1995)

Personal details
- Born: Teng Chang Khim; 2 June 1963 (age 62) Batu Pahat, Johor, Federation of Malaya (now Malaysia)
- Citizenship: Malaysian
- Party: Democratic Action Party (DAP)
- Other political affiliations: Gagasan Rakyat (GR) (1990–1996); Barisan Alternatif (BA) (1999–2004); Pakatan Rakyat (PR) (2008–2015); Pakatan Harapan (PH) (since 2015)
- Relations: Teng Chang Yeow (younger brother) & Teng Boon Soon (uncle)
- Parent(s): Teng Boon Ngap (father) & Wang Chin Eng (mother)
- Occupation: Politician
- Profession: Lawyer
- Teng Chang Khim on Facebook

Teng Chang Khim (simplified Chinese: 邓章钦; traditional Chinese: 鄧章欽; pinyin: Dèng Zhāngqīn; Pe̍h-ōe-jī: Tēng Chiong-khim; born 2 June 1963) is a Malaysian politician and lawyer who served as a Senior Member of the Selangor State Executive Council (EXCO) in three successive Pakatan Rakyat (PR) and Pakatan Harapan (PH) state administrations from May 2013 to August 2023. He also served as the 9th Speaker of the Selangor State Legislative Assembly from April 2008 to May 2013.

Having retired from active politics, Teng remains member of the Democratic Action Party (DAP), a component party of the Pakatan Harapan.

On 2 December 2020, he announced his decision to retirement from active politics and will not seek re-election both in the next coming general election and in the party.

== Early life and career ==
Teng obtained his bachelor's degree in law from the University of London and had started his legal career as an advocate and solicitor at the High Court of Malaya from 1995 until 2008.

== Political career ==
DAP once allowed Teng Chang Khim to be nominated as an independent as a backup in 1995 general election in Bukit Bintang seat. However, after Wee Choo Keong's nomination was accepted by the Election Commission, the DAP asked Teng to withdraw from the election.

Teng was first elected to the Selangor State Legislative Assembly in the 1995 Malaysian general election and represented four constituencies during his political career; Bukit Gasing from April 1995 to November 1999, Bandar Klang from November 1999 to March 2004, Sungai Pinang from March 2004 to May 2018, and Bandar Baru Klang from May 2018 to August 2023.

He also served as a Senior Member of the Selangor State Executive Council (EXCO) state administrations of Khalid Ibrahim, Azmin Ali and Amirudin Shari from May 2013 to August 2023.

In 2012, Teng was rebuked for his acceptance of a royal honour in 2010, which breached the party's long-standing agreement that elected representatives from the DAP would not receive awards during their political service.

On 2 December 2020, he announced his decision to retirement from active politics and will not seek re-election both in the coming national and party elections.

== Personal life ==
His younger brother Teng Chang Yeow, the former Member of the Penang State Legislative Assembly for Padang Kota. Unlike Teng Chang Khim himself, Teng Chang Yeow is a member of the Parti Gerakan Rakyat Malaysia (GERAKAN), a former component of the Barisan Nasional (BN) coalition. Nevertheless, both are sons of Teng Boon Ngap, who was a prominent member of the Malaysian Chinese Association (MCA) of BN before 1980s. They are also nephews to the former Tebrau MP Teng Boon Soon.

== Election results ==
Selangor State Legislative Assembly
Year	Constituency	Candidate	Votes	Pct	Opponent(s)	Votes	Pct	Ballots cast	Majority	Turnout
1995	N27 Bukit Gasing	Teng Chang Khim (DAP)	11,348	53.01%	Lim Thuang Seng (Gerakan)	10,058	46.99%	21,889	1,290	64.58%
1999	N41 Bandar Klang	Teng Chang Khim (DAP)	13,927	49.72%	Tan Chee Keong (MCA)	13,482	48.14%	28,501	445	71.82%
1999	N41 Bandar Klang	Teng Chang Khim (DAP)	13,927	49.72%	Chua Kok Eng (MDP)	599	2.14%	28,501	445	71.82%
2004	N44 Sungai Pinang	Teng Chang Khim (DAP)	10,484	60.41%	Khoh Siew Kim (MCA)	6,871	39.59%	17,744	3,613	72.38%
2008	N44 Sungai Pinang	Teng Chang Khim (DAP)	12,856	70.06%	Song Kee Chai (MCA)	5,495	29.94%	18,695	7,361	77.29%
2013	N44 Sungai Pinang	Teng Chang Khim (DAP)	17,364	74.13%	Lee Siew Chee (MCA)	6,055	25.87%	23,710	11,309	86.70%
2018	N45 Bandar Baru Klang	Teng Chang Khim (DAP)	44,926	89.81%	Teoh Kah Yeong (MCA)	5,098	10.19%	50,564	39,828	87.15%

Parliament of Malaysia
Year	Constituency	Candidate	Votes	Pct	Opponent(s)	Votes	Pct	Ballots cast	Majority	Turnout
1995	P108 Bukit Bintang	Teng Chang Khim (IND)	123	0.35%	Wee Choo Keong (DAP)	20,403	57.66%	36,666	5,546	61.75%
1995	P108 Bukit Bintang	Teng Chang Khim (IND)	123	0.35%	Lee Chong Meng (MCA)	14,857	41.99%	36,666	5,546	61.75%
1999	P100 Klang	Teng Chang Khim (DAP)	24,528	44.36%	Tan Yee Kew (MCA)	30,201	54.61%	56,325	5,673	69.81%
1999	P100 Klang	Teng Chang Khim (DAP)	24,528	44.36%	Tan Siow Eng (MDP)	570	1.03%	56,325	5,673	69.81%

== Honours ==
=== Honours of Malaysia ===
- Selangor
  - Knight Commander of the Order of the Crown of Selangor (DPMS) – Dato' (2010)
