= Ayer Itam Road =

Road in the Malaysian state of Penang

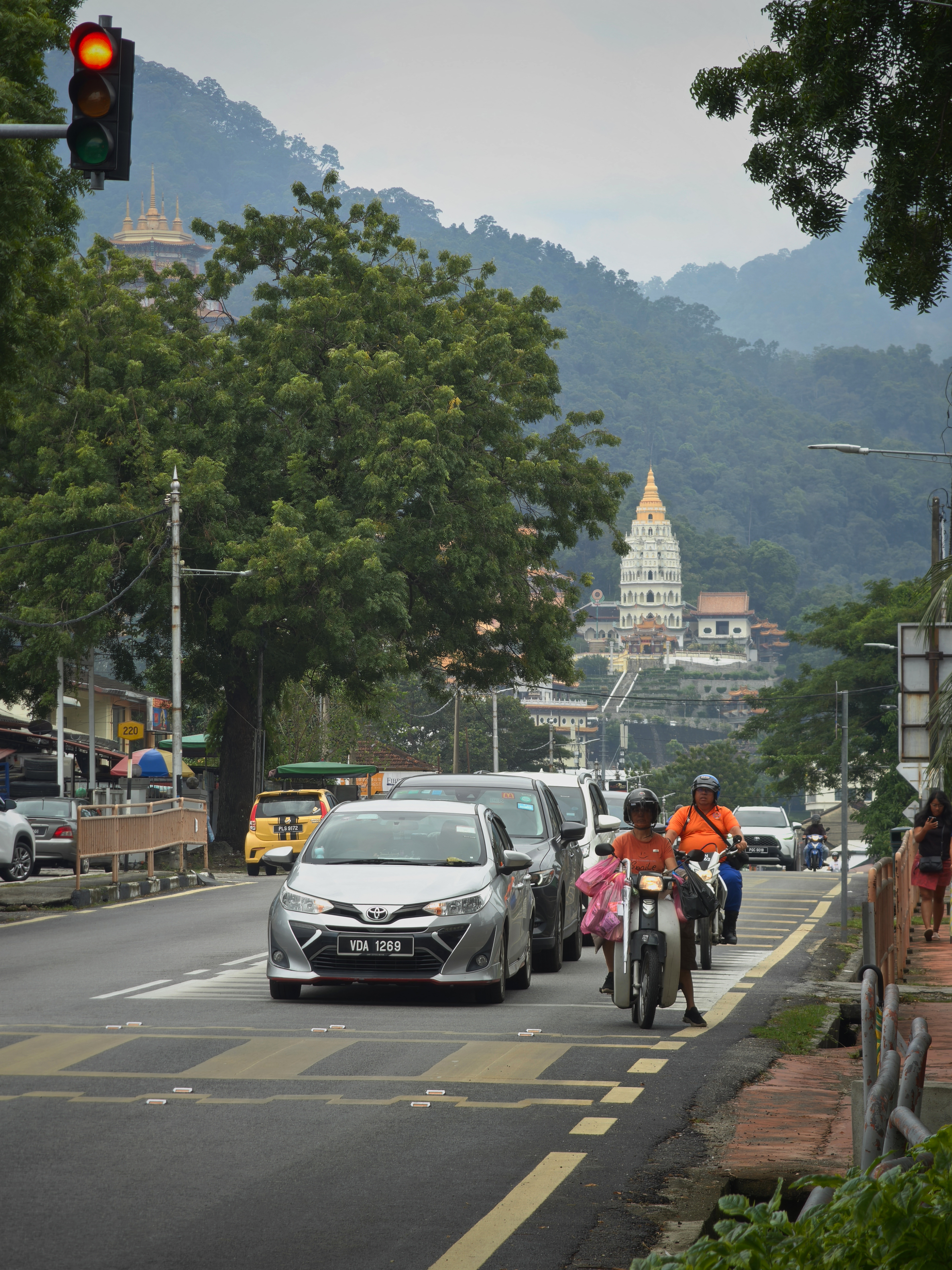
- Native name: Malay: Jalan Ayer Itam
- Maintained by: the Penang Island City Council
- Location: George Town
- Coordinates: 5.405363°N 100.282528°E
- East end: Dato Keramat Road; Western Road
- West end: Jalan Paya Terubong
- JALAN Ayer Itam 10450 P. PINANG

Ayer Itam Road is a major thoroughfare within the city of George Town in the Malaysian state of Penang. It is one of the main roads leading out of the city centre towards the suburb of Ayer Itam.

== History ==
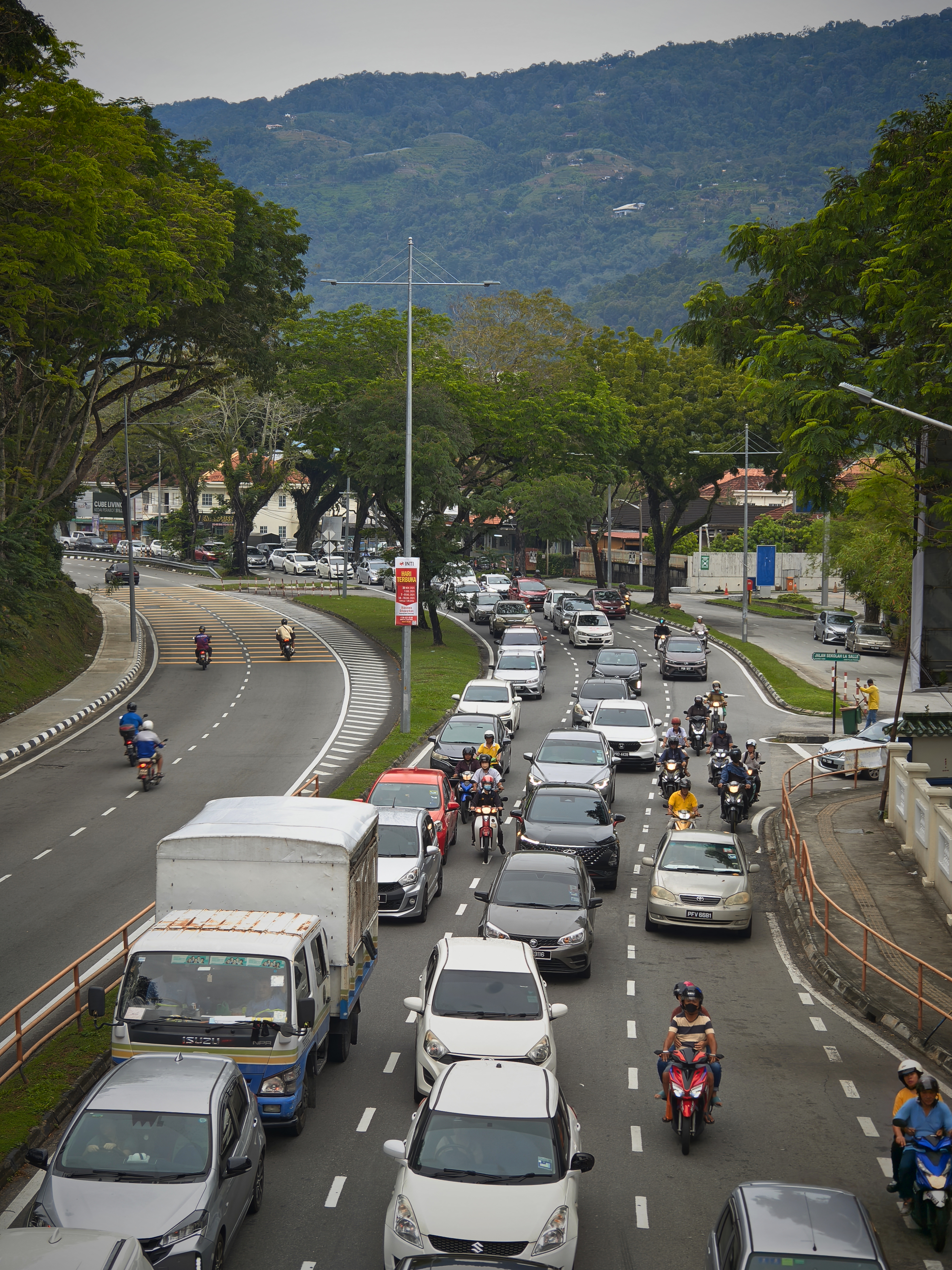
Ayer Itam Road during rush hour

A road connecting downtown George Town and Ayer Itam to the west has existed since 1790. This road facilitated the transportation of local agricultural produce, including nutmeg and pepper, from the interior estates to the settlement's harbour.

By 1900, a tram line along the road became operational. In the 1930s, the road was widened and street lighting was installed by 1938.

Ayer Itam Road experiences significant congestion, especially during rush hours, attributed to the increase in car ownership. In response, the Penang state government has planned several infrastructural upgrades to reduce traffic congestion along this corridor. These include the construction of expressways and a monorail line as part of the Penang Transport Master Plan.

== Landmarks ==
- Suffolk House
- Methodist Boys' School
- Han Chiang University College
- Penang State Mosque
- Chung Ling High School
- Ayer Itam War Memorial Park

== See also ==
- List of streets in George Town
