= Bandar Baru Klang (state constituency) =

State constituency in Selangor, Malaysia

Bandar Baru Klang (N45)
Selangor constituency

State constituency
- Legislature: Selangor State Legislative Assembly
MLA
Quah Perng Fei
PH
- Constituency created: 2018
- First contested: 2018
- Last contested: 2023

Demographics
- Electors (2023): 82,826

Bandar Baru Klang is a state constituency in Selangor, Malaysia, that has been represented in the Selangor State Legislative Assembly since 2018. It has been represented by Quah Perng Fei of Pakatan Harapan (PH) since 2023.

The state constituency was created in the 2018 redistribution and is mandated to return a single member to the Selangor State Legislative Assembly under the first past the post voting system.

== Demographics ==
Ethnic breakdown of Bandar Baru Klang's electorate as of 2023
1. Chinese (67.7%)
2. Malay (16.0%)
3. Indian (15.2%)
4. Other ethnicities (1.22%)

== History ==
According to the federal gazette issued on 30 March 2018, the Bandar Baru Klang constituency is divided into 19 polling districts.

State constituency	Polling district	Code	Location
Bandar Baru Klang（N45）	Taman Eng Ann 1	110/45/01	SM (Persendirian) Kwang Hua
Bandar Baru Klang（N45）	Persiaran Sultan Ibrahim 2	110/45/02	Dewan Putera, SMK Tinggi Klang
Bandar Baru Klang（N45）	Bandar Klang	110/45/03	SK (1) Jalan Meru; SK (2) Jalan Meru
Bandar Baru Klang（N45）	Sungai Pinang Selatan	110/45/04	SM Pin Hwa
Bandar Baru Klang（N45）	Pasar Jawa	110/45/05	SM Pin Hwa
Bandar Baru Klang（N45）	Jalan Goh Hock Huat	110/45/06	SA Rakyat (KAFA Integrasi) Al-Falah
Bandar Baru Klang（N45）	Persiaran Sultan Ibrahim 1	110/45/07	SMK Tinggi Klang
Bandar Baru Klang（N45）	Taman Eng Ann 2	110/45/08	Dewan Serbaguna Taman Eng Ann
Bandar Baru Klang（N45）	Taman Berkeley	110/45/09	SK (1) Jalan Batu Tiga; SK (2) Jalan Batu Tiga
Bandar Baru Klang（N45）	Bandar Baru Klang	110/45/10	Sekolah Sri Acmar (Rendah)
Bandar Baru Klang（N45）	Bukit Kuda	110/45/11	SJK (C) Kong Hoe
Bandar Baru Klang（N45）	Kampung Batu Belah	110/45/12	SRA Batu Belah
Bandar Baru Klang（N45）	Taman Klang	110/45/13	SK Batu Belah
Bandar Baru Klang（N45）	Jalan Meru	110/45/14	SJK (T) Jalan Meru
Bandar Baru Klang（N45）	Klang Kawasan 19	110/45/15	SRA Integrasi Tengku Ampuan Fatimah
Bandar Baru Klang（N45）	Taman Klang Utama 1	110/45/16	SK Taman Klang Utama
Bandar Baru Klang（N45）	Taman Klang Utama 2	110/45/17	SMK Taman Klang Utama
Bandar Baru Klang（N45）	Sungai Bertih Selatan	110/45/18	SK Telok Pulai
Bandar Baru Klang（N45）	Sungai Bertih Utara	110/45/19	SMA Sultan Hisamuddin

=== Representation history ===
Members of the Legislative Assembly for Bandar Baru Klang
Assembly	No	Years	Member	Party
Constituency renamed from Sungai Pinang, Meru, Sementa, Kota Anggerik, Batu Tiga and Selat Klang
14th	N40	2018–2023	Teng Chang Khim (邓章钦)	PH (DAP)
15th	N40	2023–present	Quah Perng Fei (柯鹏飞)	PH (DAP)

== Election results ==
Selangor state election, 2023
Party	Candidate	Votes	%	∆%
PH	Quah Perng Fei	53,658	87.04	▼2.77
PN	Tan Seng Huat	7,986	12.96	▲12.96
Total valid votes		61,644	100.00	
Total rejected ballots		284		
Unreturned ballots		65		
Turnout		61,993	74.85	▼12.30
Registered electors		82,826		
Majority		45,672	74.08	▼5.54
PH hold		Swing		

Selangor state election, 2018
Party	Candidate	Votes	%
PKR	Teng Chang Khim	44,926	89.81
BN	Teoh Kah Yeong	5,098	10.19
Total valid votes		50,024	100.00
Total rejected ballots		540	
Unreturned ballots		0	
Turnout		50,564	87.15
Registered electors		58,017	
Majority		39,828	79.62
This was a new constituency created.
