= Sungai Pinang (Selangor state constituency) =

Selangor constituency

Defunct state constituency
- Legislature: Selangor State Legislative Assembly
- Constituency created: 2003
- Constituency abolished: 2018
- First contested: 2004
- Last contested: 2018

Sungai Pinang was a state constituency in Selangor, Malaysia, that had been represented in the Selangor State Legislative Assembly since 2004 to 2018.

The state constituency was created in the 2003 redistribution and is mandated to return a single member to the Selangor State Legislative Assembly under the first past the post voting system.

== History ==
It was abolished in 2004 when it was redistributed.

=== Representation history ===
Members of the Legislative Assembly for Sungai Pinang
Assembly	No	Years	Member	Party
Constituency created from Bandar Klang
11th	N44	2004-2008	Teng Chang Khim (邓章钦)	DAP
12th	N44	2008-2013	Teng Chang Khim (邓章钦)	DAP
13th	N44	2013-2018	Teng Chang Khim (邓章钦)	DAP
Constituency split into Sementa and Bandar Baru Klang

== Election results ==
Selangor state election, 2013
Party	Candidate	Votes	%	∆%
DAP	Teng Chang Khim	17,364	74.14	▲4.08
BN	Lee Siew Chee	6,055	25.86	▼4.08
Total valid votes		23,419	100.00	
Total rejected ballots		291		
Unreturned ballots		37		
Turnout		23,747	86.66	▲9.37
Registered electors		27,404		
Majority		11,309	48.28	▲8.16
DAP hold		Swing		
Source(s) "Federal Government Gazette - Notice of Contested Election, State Legislative Assembly for the State of Selangor [P.U. (B) 192/2013]" (PDF). Attorney General's Chambers of Malaysia. 26 April 2013. Archived from the original (PDF) on 29 December 2019. "Federal Government Gazette - Results of Contested Election and Statements of the Poll after the Official Addition of Votes, State Constituencies for the State of Selangor [P.U. (B) 233/2013]" (PDF). Attorney General's Chambers of Malaysia. 22 May 2013. Archived from the original (PDF) on 2 October 2018."undi.info N44 SUNGAI PINANG".

Selangor state election, 2008
Party	Candidate	Votes	%	∆%
DAP	Teng Chang Khim	12,856	70.06	▲9.65
BN	Song Kee Chai	5,495	29.94	▼9.65
Total valid votes		18,351	100.00	
Total rejected ballots		328		
Unreturned ballots		16		
Turnout		18,695	77.29	▲4.91
Registered electors		24,189		
Majority		7,361	40.12	▲19.30
DAP hold		Swing		
Source(s) "undi.info N44 SUNGAI PINANG".

Selangor state election, 2004
Party	Candidate	Votes	%	∆%
DAP	Teng Chang Khim	10,484	60.41	
BN	Khoh Siew Kim	6,871	39.59	
Total valid votes		17,355	100.00	
Total rejected ballots		387		
Unreturned ballots		2		
Turnout		17,744	72.38	
Registered electors		24,514		
Majority		3,613	20.82	
This was a new constituency created.
Source(s) "undi.info N44 SUNGAI PINANG".
