= Penang Times Square =

Mixed-use development in George Town, Penang, Malaysia

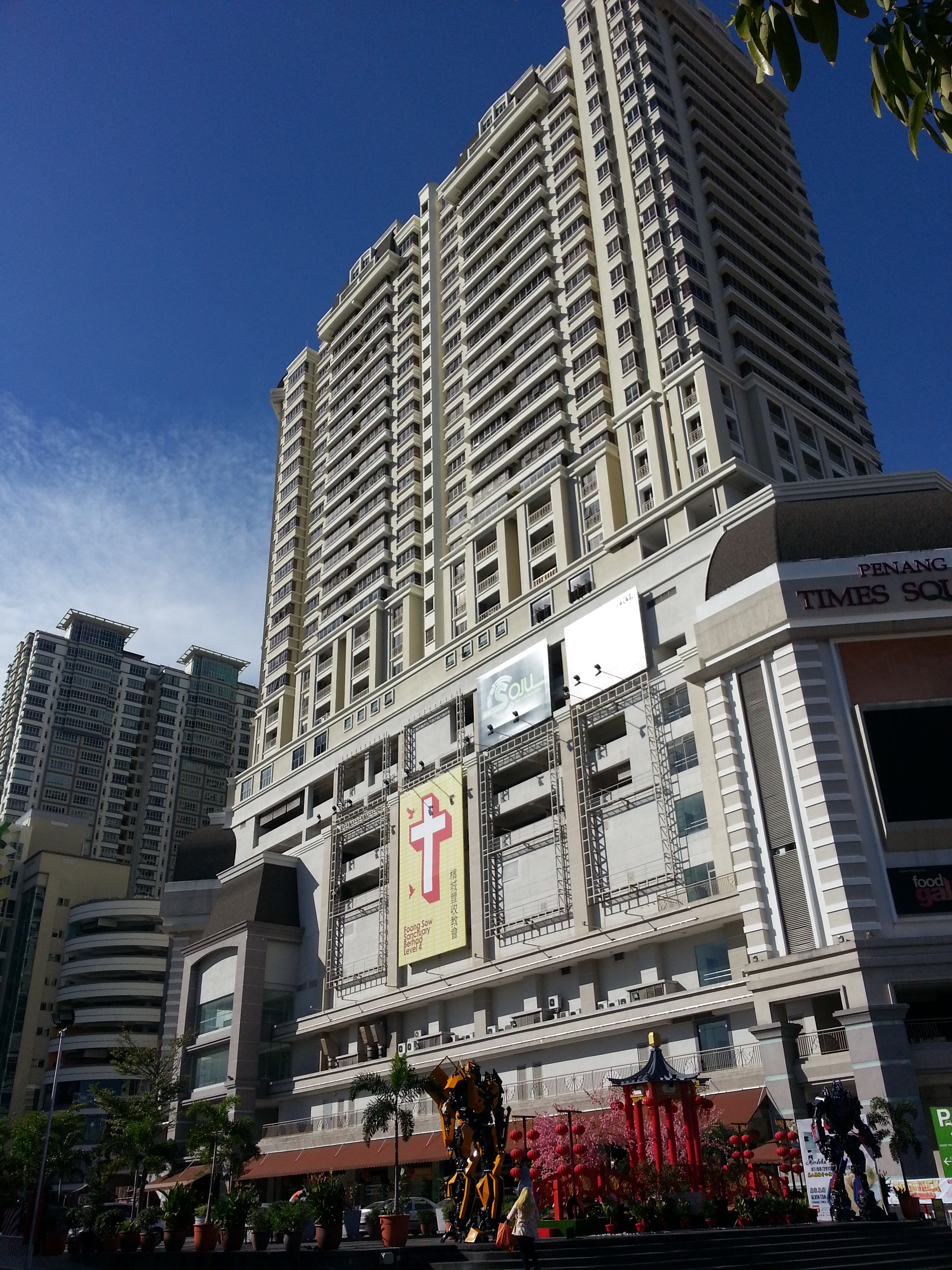
- Penang Times Square

General information
- Status: Partially completed
- Type: Mixed-use development
- Location: George Town, Penang, Malaysia, Dato Keramat Road
- Coordinates: 5.4123°N 100.3254°E
- Construction started: 2005

Design and construction
- Developer: Ivory Properties Group

Penang Times Square is a partially completed mixed-use urban redevelopment project along Dato Keramat Road in George Town, in the Malaysian state of Penang. Developed by Ivory Properties Group from 2005, the master plan was eventually divided into five phases comprising residential towers, commercial podiums, retail space, a public square and proposed hotel developments.

As of 2026, only Phases 1 and 2 have been completed. Phase 3, known as The Wave, remains unfinished following a prolonged suspension of construction and the liquidation of its developer, Ivory Gleneary Sdn Bhd. Phases 4 and 5 have not been built. The former M Mall O2O retail complex within Phase 2 has also been largely vacant since 2020.

== History ==
=== Tin-smelting site ===
The site of Penang Times Square was formerly occupied by a major tin-smelting works. In 1897, Chinese tin entrepreneur Lee Chin Ho established the Seng Kee Tin Smelting Works at Dato Keramat Road. The plant processed tin ore obtained from the Kinta Valley in Perak, other parts of the Malay Peninsula and southern Siam, before the refined tin was exported through Penang.

The business was reorganised as the Eastern Smelting Company in 1907 after former Perak Resident Sir Ernest Woodford Birch and other associates acquired a controlling interest. A two-storey building completed in 1908 for the company was named Birch House after Birch.

The smelting works continued operating under successive corporate structures until the late 20th century. Following the decline of Malaysia's tin industry, the facility was closed and the site was subsequently acquired for redevelopment. Birch House was retained and restored as part of the later Penang Times Square development.

=== Development of Penang Times Square ===
Ivory Properties began developing Penang Times Square in 2005. Early plans covered approximately 13 acres and envisaged a mixed-use precinct containing residential and retail buildings, hotel accommodation, entertainment and convention facilities and an urban square.

The first phase comprised Birch the Plaza & Commercial. Contemporary plans listed 395 condominium units, 22 penthouses and 211 retail lots. An open space of more than two acres within the development was named Chin Ho Plaza after Lee Chin Ho, the founder of the former tin-smelting works.

Phase 2, Birch Regency & Commercial, added a second residential and commercial component. Its retail portion was subsequently operated as M Mall O2O by MBI. At its formal opening in June 2016, the mall contained more than 300 retail lots over approximately 353,317 square feet (32,824.2 m^{2}) of retail space.

Ivory Properties stated in 2015 that it intended to complete all five phases by 2020, with later phases to include additional retail, serviced residences and hotel components. The target was not achieved.

== Development phases ==
Ivory Properties' 2024 annual report continued to describe Penang Times Square as a five-phase development with an estimated overall gross development value of RM1.83 billion.

Phase	Development	Status by 2026	Description
Phase 1	Birch the Plaza & Commercial	Completed	Residential towers and an associated commercial podium forming the original Penang Times Square development.
Phase 2	Birch Regency & Commercial	Completed	Residential development and commercial space which later included M Mall O2O.
Phase 3	The Wave & Commercial	Incomplete; construction suspended	Planned as 312 suites above a four-storey commercial podium, with an estimated gross development value of about RM500 million.
Phase 4	Phase 4	Unbuilt	Originally planned as serviced apartments above a commercial podium.
Phase 5	Phase 5	Unbuilt	Planned as a boutique hotel development with a rooftop bar and an estimated gross development value of RM126 million.

== M Mall O2O ==
M Mall O2O occupied the principal retail component of Phase 2. The mall began operating in the mid-2010s and was formally opened in June 2016. Its concept combined conventional retail with an online-to-offline purchasing system, while its interior included themed areas based on different countries and cultures.

MBI became both a major tenant and a substantial purchaser of retail and residential units within Penang Times Square. Following the collapse of MBI's activities in 2018, businesses within the mall progressively closed. The Edge reported in 2024 that the mall had remained unused since 2020.

== Suspension and liquidation of Phase 3 ==
Phase 3, The Wave, was planned as a tower containing 312 suites above a four-storey commercial podium. Ivory Properties' 2024 annual report stated that development had been suspended after the group encountered difficulties securing financing. The delay also resulted in claims for liquidated ascertained damages from purchasers.

In 2024, Ivory Properties initiated a scheme of arrangement intended to address approximately RM73.6 million in liquidated ascertained damages and enable completion of Phase 3. The proposal failed to obtain sufficient support from creditors. In September 2024, liquidators were appointed to Ivory Gleneary Sdn Bhd, the subsidiary responsible for the development.

The liquidators subsequently sought proposals from other developers or investors to complete Phase 3 and develop the remaining land earmarked for Phases 4 and 5.

In April 2025, following Ivory Gleneary's entry into creditors' voluntary liquidation, an earlier agreement to sell a 1.22-acre parcel within the Penang Times Square development to Chin Hin Property (Penang) Sdn Bhd was revoked. The parcel had been intended for a multi-storey residential development.

== Birch House ==
Birch House, completed in 1908, is one of the principal surviving structures from the former Eastern Smelting complex. It was preserved during the redevelopment of the site and later used by Ivory Properties, while part of the building was leased to a restaurant chain.

In May 2025, Ivory Properties announced the sale of Birch House for RM18 million to raise funds to repay bank borrowings. Of the proceeds, RM10.5 million was allocated to repayment of bank debt and RM7.5 million to working capital.

== Developer's financial difficulties ==
Ivory Properties entered Practice Note 17 (PN17) status in 2022 after its external auditor issued a disclaimer of opinion and raised concerns over its ability to continue as a going concern. Its financial difficulties were associated in part with the prolonged suspension of Phase 3, financing obligations and purchaser compensation claims.

In October 2025, Bursa Malaysia rejected Ivory Properties' request for a further extension to submit a regularisation plan. The company's securities were subsequently removed from Bursa Malaysia's Main Market on 14 October 2025. Ivory Properties continued to exist as an unlisted company following the delisting.

== Transport ==
Penang Times Square is situated near Komtar at the southern edge of central George Town and is served by local bus routes along Dato Keramat Road.

A preliminary version of the Penang Transport Master Plan published in 2016 proposed an Ayer Itam monorail route with a station at Penang Times Square. The monorail proposal was not implemented.

The rail project currently under construction in Penang is the Mutiara line, which runs from the southern part of Penang Island through Bayan Lepas and Macallum to Komtar, with an additional connection to Penang Sentral. The current approved alignment does not include a Penang Times Square station. Construction began in 2025 and passenger operations are scheduled to begin in December 2031.

== See also ==
- M Mall O2O
- Komtar
- List of shopping malls in Malaysia
