= RECSAM =

SEAMEO RESCAM
- Company type: Non-profit Organization
- Industry: Education
- Founded: 1967
- Headquarters: Penang, Malaysia
- Area served: Brunei; Cambodia; Indonesia; Laos; Malaysia; Myanmar; Philippines; Singapore; Thailand; Timor Leste; Vietnam
- Key people: Dr. Suhaidah Tahir, Director
- Website: www.recsam.edu.my

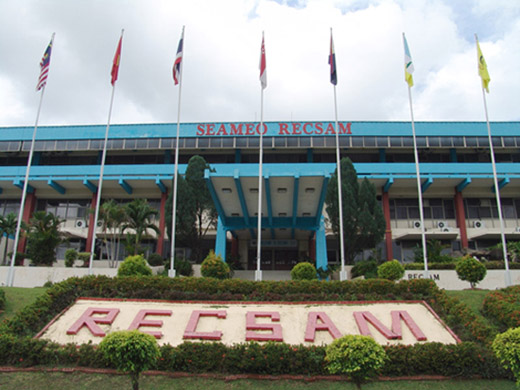
Regional Centre for Education in Science and Mathematics.

The Regional Centre for Education in Science and Mathematics (RECSAM) is a multinational educational corporation headquartered in Penang, Malaysia. It was founded in 1967 as part of the Southeast Asian Ministers of Education Organisation (SEAMEO).

Since its inception in 1967, RECSAM has assisted in the training of educators in science and mathematics at the primary and secondary school levels in Brunei Darussalam, Cambodia, Indonesia, Laos, Malaysia, Myanmar, the Philippines, Singapore, Thailand, Timor Leste and Vietnam.
