= Pinang River (Penang) =

River in Penang, Malaysia

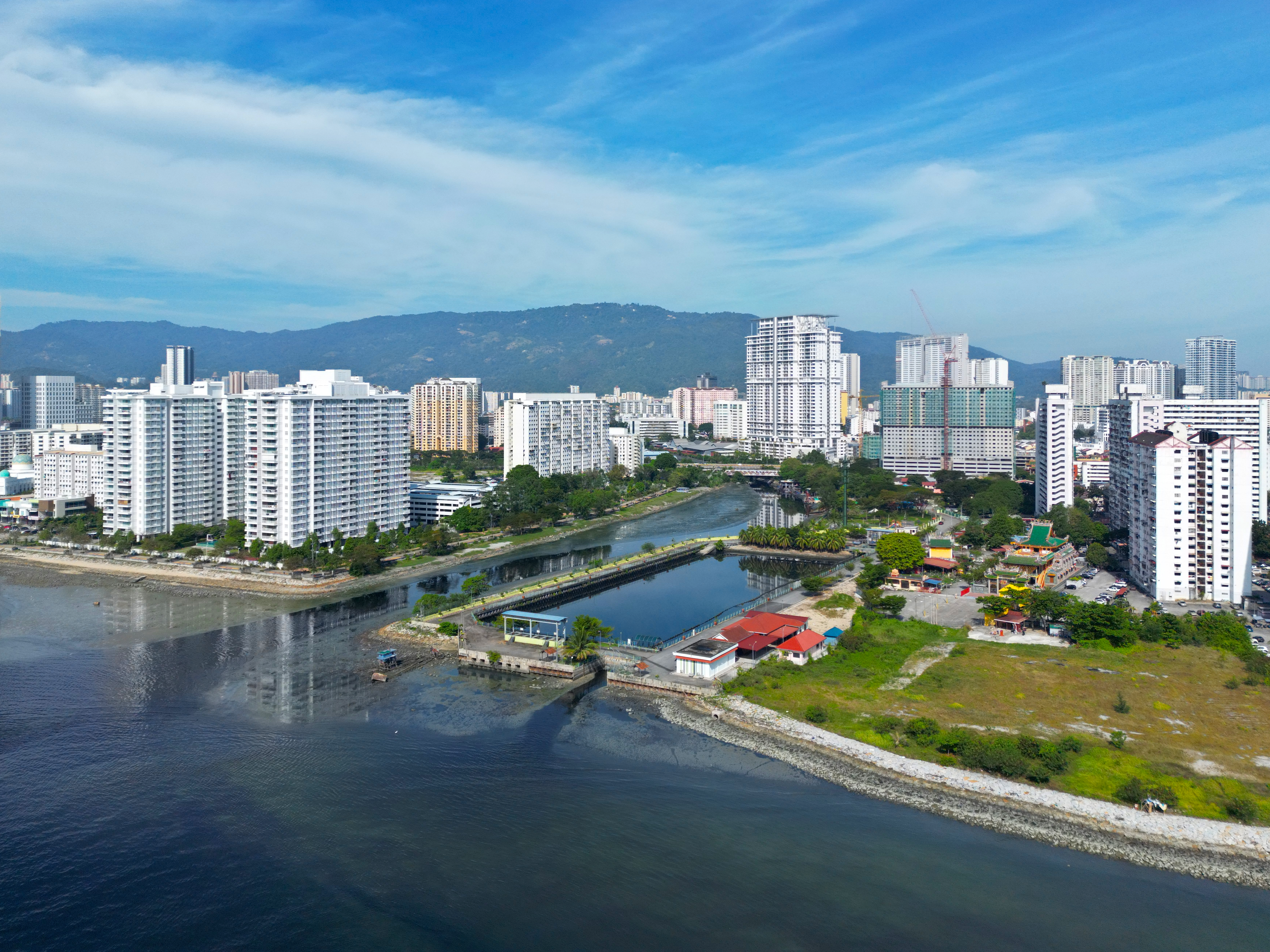

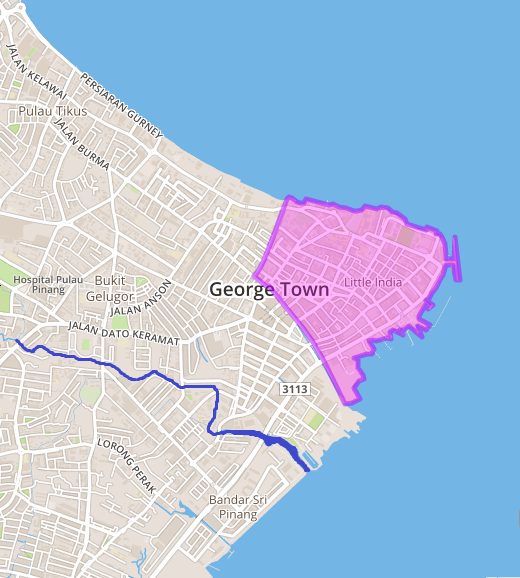
- Pinang River (dark blue) within the George Town city centre
- Native name: Sungai Pinang (Malay)

Location
- Country: Malaysia
- State: Penang
- City: George Town

Physical characteristics
- Mouth
  - location: Penang Strait
  - coordinates: 5°24′3.812″N 100°20′0.83″E
- Length: 3.5 km (2.2 mi)
- Basin size: 50.97 km^{2} (19.68 sq mi)

The Pinang River is a river that runs through the city of George Town within the Malaysian state of Penang. Stretching for approximately 3.5 kilometres (2.2 miles), the river cuts through the city centre, passing under the Tun Dr Lim Chong Eu Expressway before emptying into the Penang Strait.

Sungai Pinang also refers to the neighbourhood that exists along the river. It is believed that the first riverine villages had been established in the late 18th century, prior to the arrival of Captain Francis Light, the founder of modern Penang.

The Pinang River was widely regarded as one of the filthiest waterways in Malaysia. In recent years, the Penang state government has intensified efforts to clean up and deepen the river, resulting in an improvement of the river's water quality.

== Geography ==
The Pinang River meanders eastwards for about 3.5 kilometres (2.2 miles) from the confluence between Air Terjun and Air Itam Rivers towards the Penang Strait. It also has four other tributaries - Kecil, Air Putih, Dondang and Jelutong Rivers.

The river's mouth, which is located east of the Tun Dr Lim Chong Eu Expressway, was actually reclaimed from the sea. The original mouth was situated under a bridge linking Bridge Street (now Jalan C.Y. Choy) and Jelutong Road.

Historically, the Pinang River had marked the southernmost limits of George Town, while its working-class suburb of Jelutong lies to the south. Nonetheless, the river area has become urbanised since the mid 20th century, with residential high-rises and office blocks lining both river banks.

== History ==
In the 18th century, prior to the founding of Penang Island by Captain Francis Light, Malay fishermen had already established fishing villages along the Pinang River. The fishermen, who originated from Kedah and Aceh, chose the river for its constant supply of fresh water, as well as a route to the interior of Penang Island. The original river mouth also served as a resting place for traders arriving via the Penang Strait.

Towards the end of the 19th century, the development of heavy industries around Jelutong, south of the Pinang River, caused extensive pollution of the river, which lasts to this day. The factories in Jelutong depended on the river for fresh water, whilst simultaneously using the river for waste disposal. Haphazard disposal of domestic and animal husbandry waste into the river has exacerbated the problem. As of 2000, the river was classed under Class V of the National Water Quality Standards, the lowest in the index, indicating severe pollution and the river's inability to support living organisms.

Since 2008, the Penang state government has ramped up efforts to clean up and deepen the Pinang River. The aim is two-fold: to improve the river's water quality to Class II of the National Water Quality Standards, and to mitigate the perennial flash floods that threaten the low-lying neighbourhoods along the river. Due to the ongoing clean-up efforts that included the installation of rubbish traps and desilting works, it was reported that, as of 2016, the water quality of nearly 60% of the Pinang River was at Class II.

== See also ==
- List of rivers of Malaysia
