= Dato Keramat Road, George Town =

Road in the Malaysian state of Penang

Dato Keramat Road
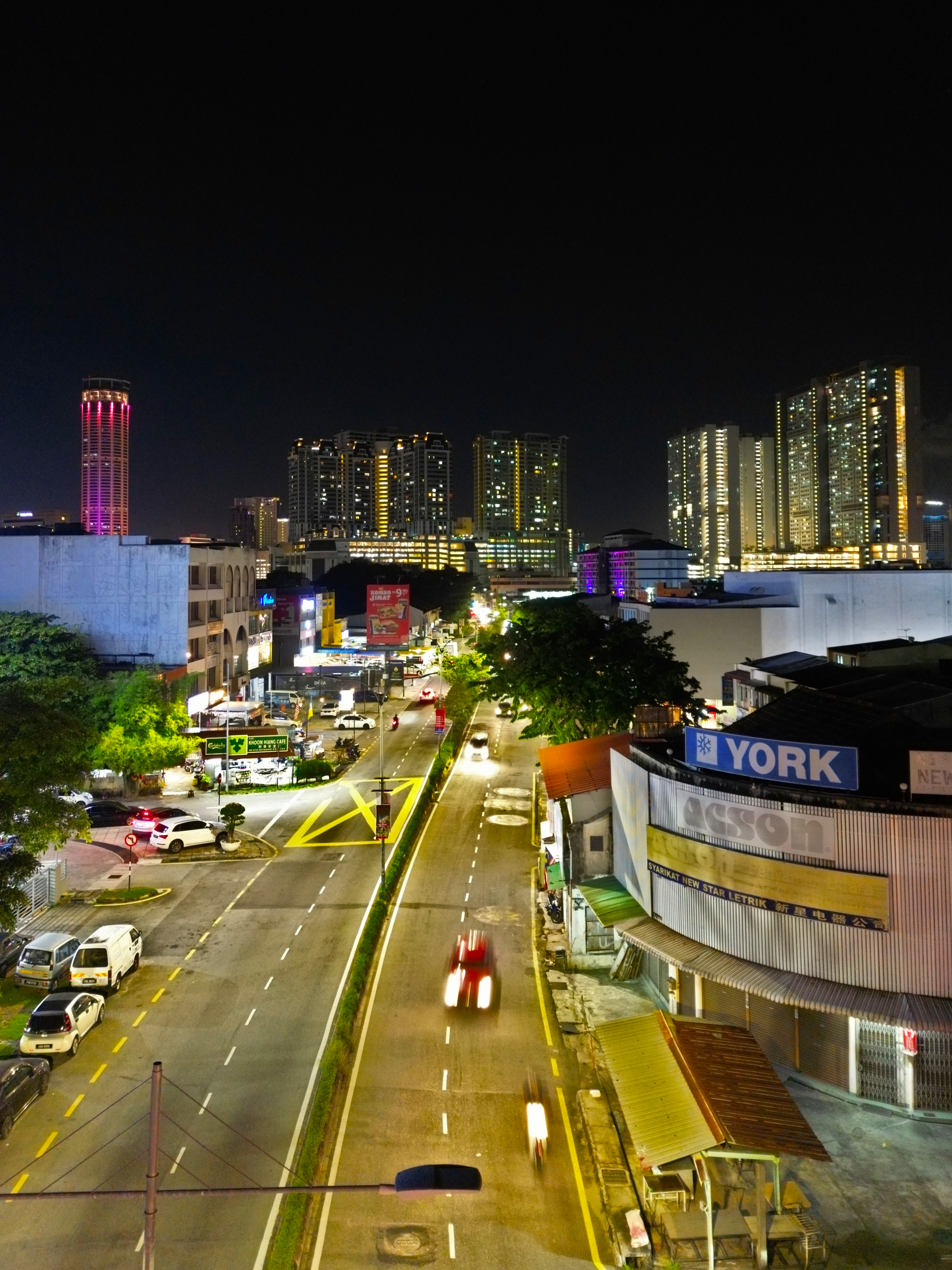
- Native name: Malay: Jalan Dato Keramat; Simplified Chinese: 柑仔园; traditional Chinese: 柑仔園; Hokkien POJ: Kam-á-huînn; Tamil: ட்டோ கேரமாத்
- Maintained by: Penang Island City Council
- Location: George Town
- Coordinates: 5.413256°N 100.326158°E
- West end: York Road; Ayer Itam Road
- East end: Magazine Circus (next to Komtar)

Construction
- Inauguration: 19th century
- JALAN DATO KERAMAT Dato Keramat Rd10150 P. PINANG

Dato Keramat Road is a major thoroughfare in the city of George Town within the Malaysian state of Penang. It is one of the main roads leading out of the city centre towards the suburb of Ayer Itam.

While older shophouses still line Dato Keramat Road to this day, the road is also home to some of the more modern landmarks in the city centre, such as Gama departmental store, Penang Times Square and the City Stadium.

== Etymology ==
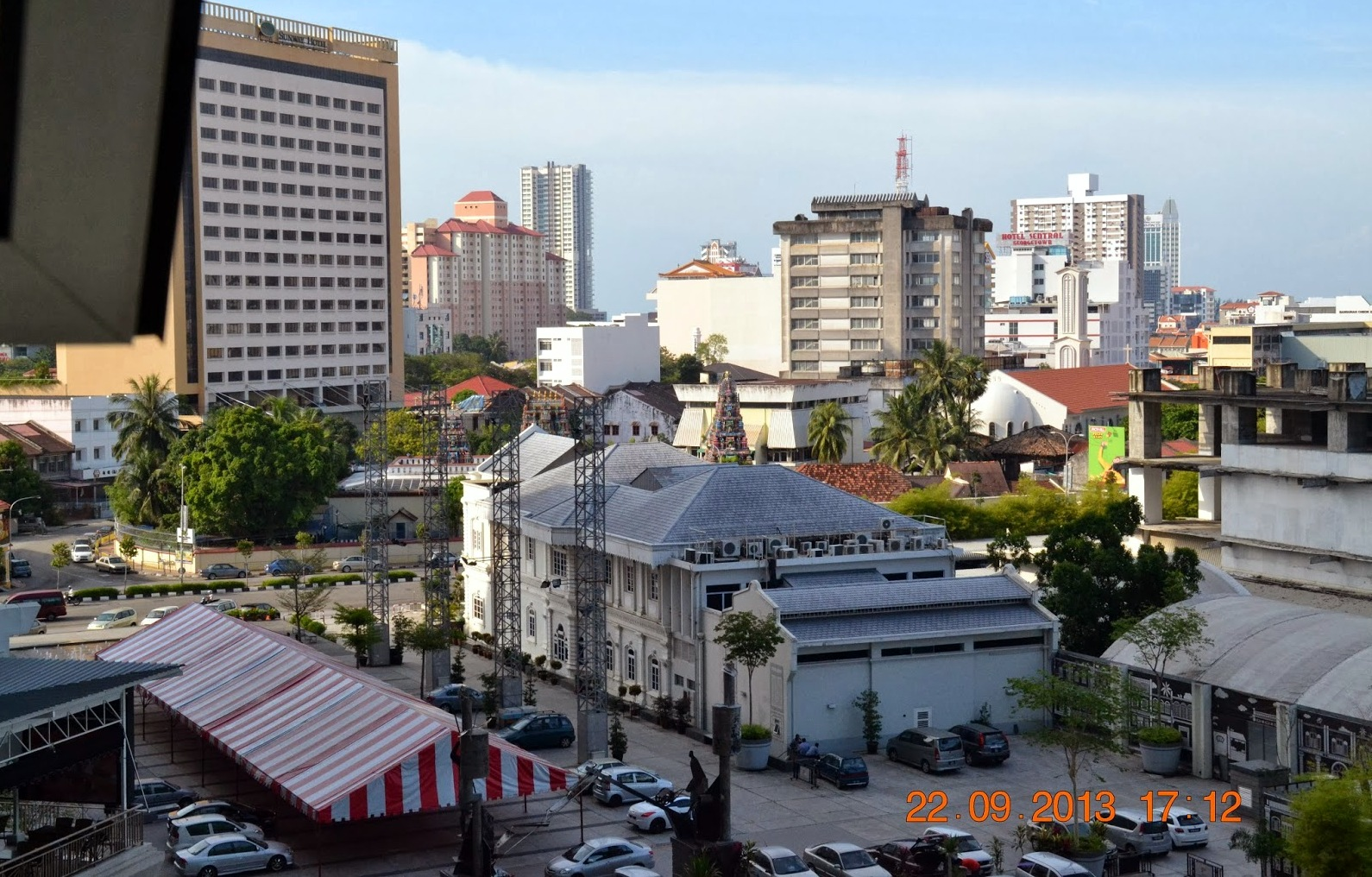
View of Dato Keramat Road, as seen from Penang Times Square.

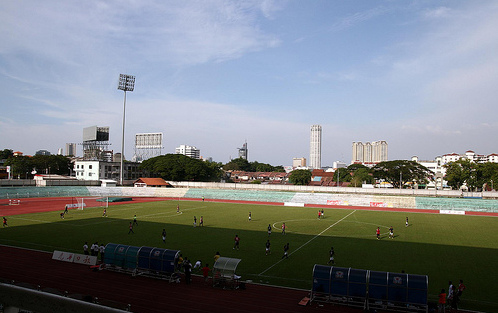
The City Stadium at Dato Keramat Road is one of the oldest stadiums in Malaysia.

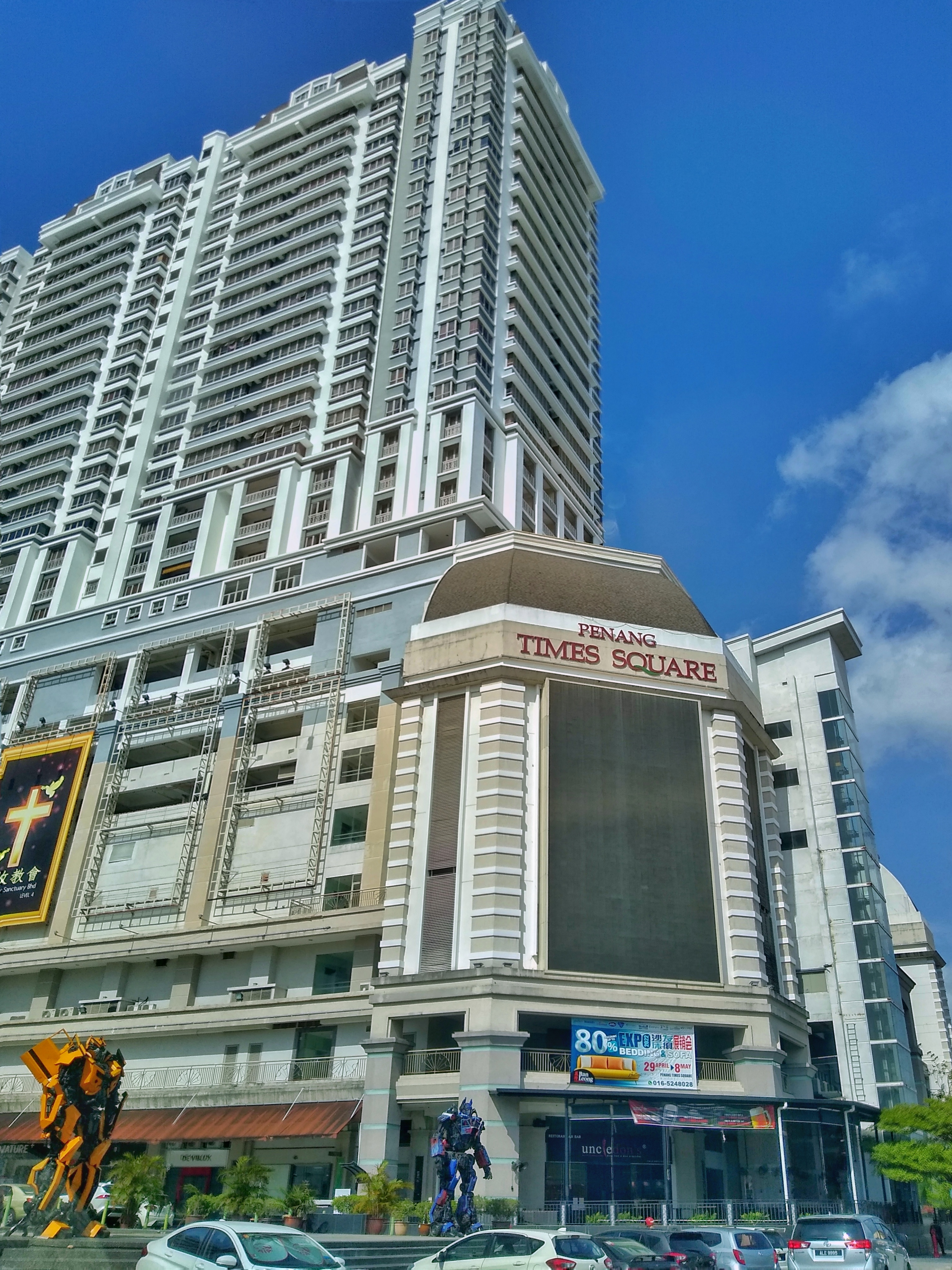
Penang Times Square now stands on the site where a tin smelting facility once existed.

Dato Keramat Road was named after Dato Keramat, a Muslim ascetic in the early 19th century who lived in a Malay settlement along the road. In Arabic, the term 'Keramat' means a holy person or place, thus the name 'Dato Keramat' may have also referred to a Muslim shrine located within that settlement.

== History ==
It is believed that Dato Keramat Road was created sometime in the 19th century. During the early 19th century, David Brown, a Scotsman and one of the richest landowners on the Prince of Wales Island (now Penang Island) at the time, donated a piece of land along the road to the local authority; that particular piece of land is now a field named Padang Brown.

A tin smelting plant was built at Dato Keramat Road towards the end of the 19th century, at a time when British Malaya witnessed a tin mining boom. Tin from Perak and southern Thailand was shipped to George Town, and then transported to the facility to be smelted into ingots for re-export via the Port of Penang. The site where the tin smelting facility once stood has since been redeveloped into Penang Times Square.

Dato Keramat Road was also known as the place where the founding father of modern China, Sun Yat-sen, once resided. In exile in 1910, Dr. Sun stayed in a house along the road, while his daughters were sent to St. George's Girls' School.

The City Stadium at Dato Keramat Road is the main sports stadium within George Town. Built by the Brithsh government and completed in 1956, the stadium is known for the vociferous home support, termed the 'Keramat Roar'. The stadium, along with Padang Brown across the road, was where some of the best Malaysian football players in the 1960s and 1970s, who also represented Penang, played and trained. In addition, the City Stadium was where Mohd Faiz Subri, a Penang FA player, scored a physics-defying goal in 2016; he was later awarded the FIFA Puskás Award for this particular effort.

== Landmarks ==
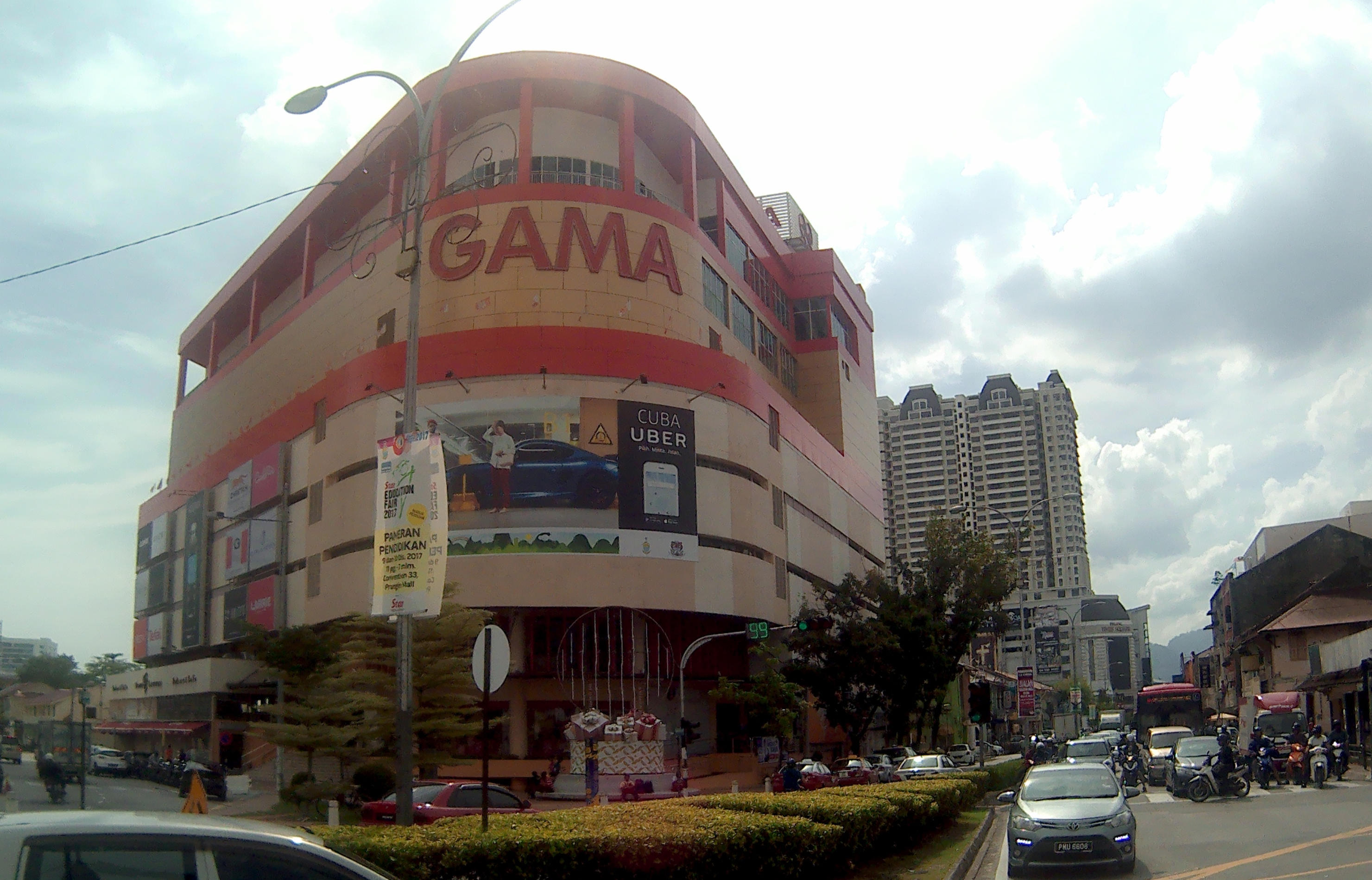
GAMA Departmental Store

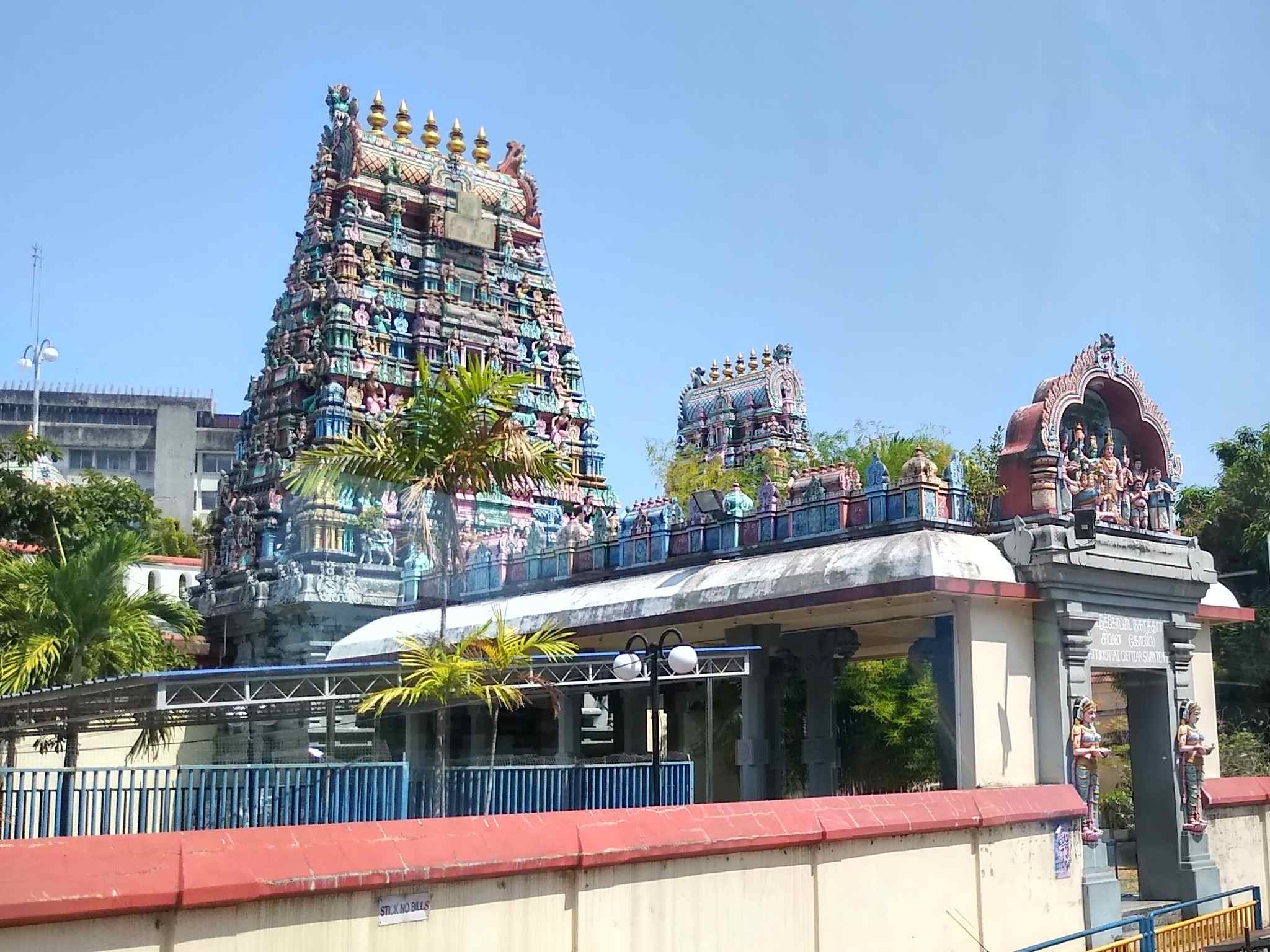
Nagarathar Sivan Temple

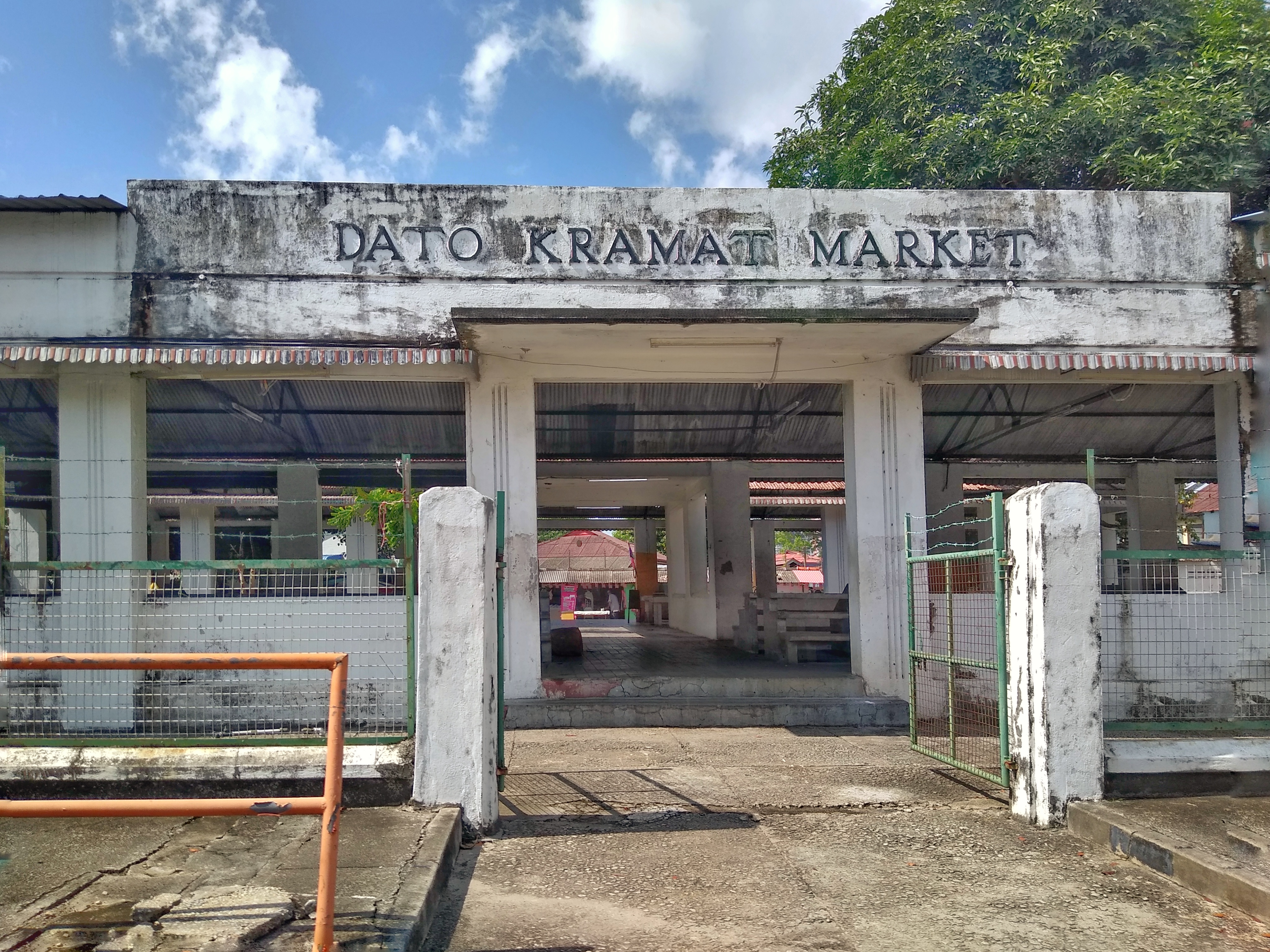
Dato Kramat Market

- Komtar
- GAMA Departmental Store
- Penang Times Square
- City Stadium
- Padang Brown
- Convent Datuk Keramat

== See also ==
- List of roads in George Town
