= Sungai Pinang =

- Neighbourhood of George Town
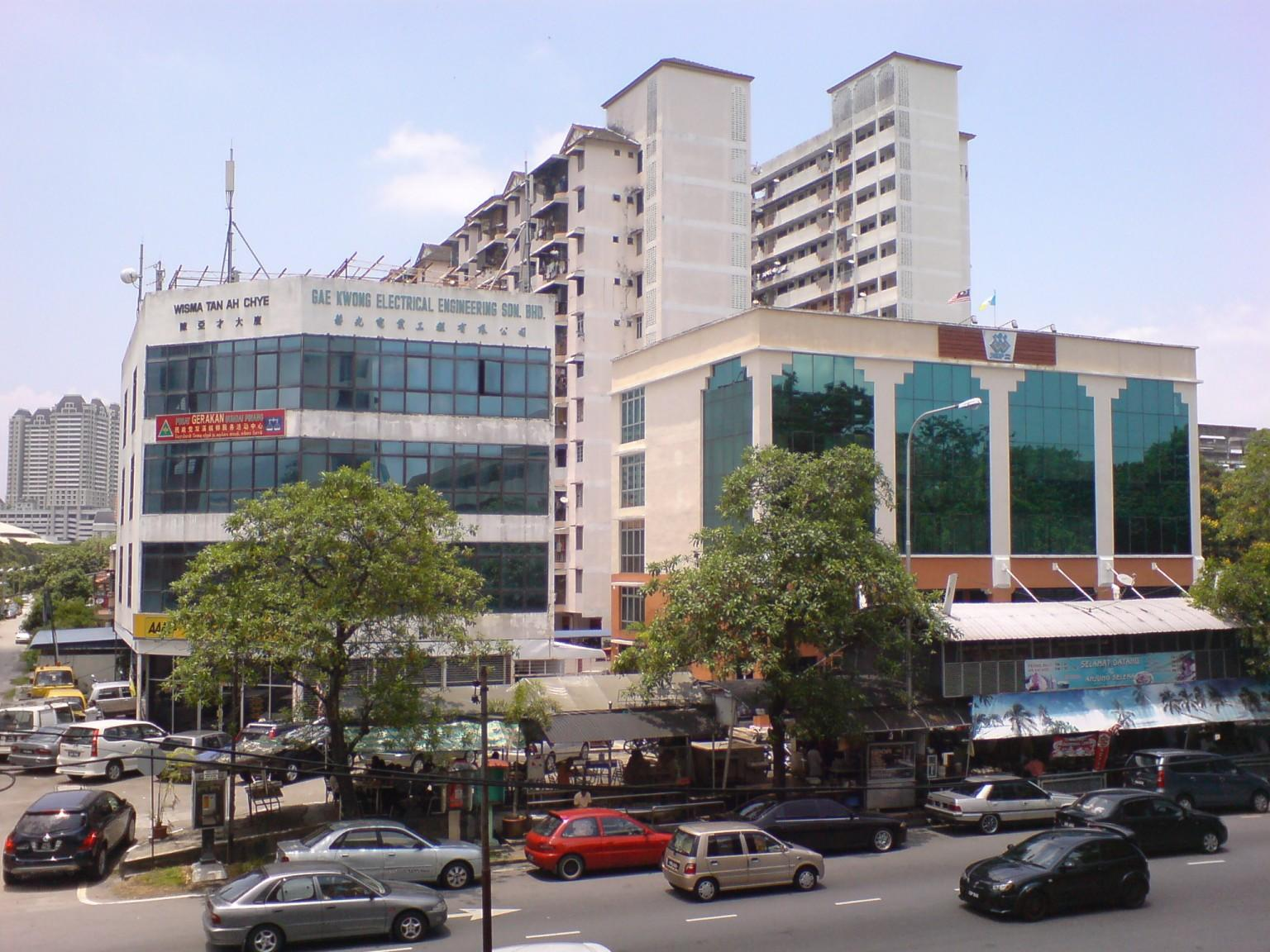

- Location within George Town in Penang
- Coordinates: 5°24′24.5514″N 100°19′10.6896″E
- Country: Malaysia
- State: Penang
- City: George Town
- District: Northeast
- Time zone: UTC+8 (MST)
  - Summer (DST): Not observed
- Postal code: 10150

Sungai Pinang is a residential neighbourhood within the downtown core of George Town in the Malaysian state of Penang. The neighbourhood lies along the southern bank of the Pinang River and is bounded by Jalan Sungai Pinang to the south.

== Etymology ==
The neighbourhood of Sungai Pinang was named after the Pinang River, which, in turn, is named after the Pinang palm, scientifically known as areca catechu.

== History ==
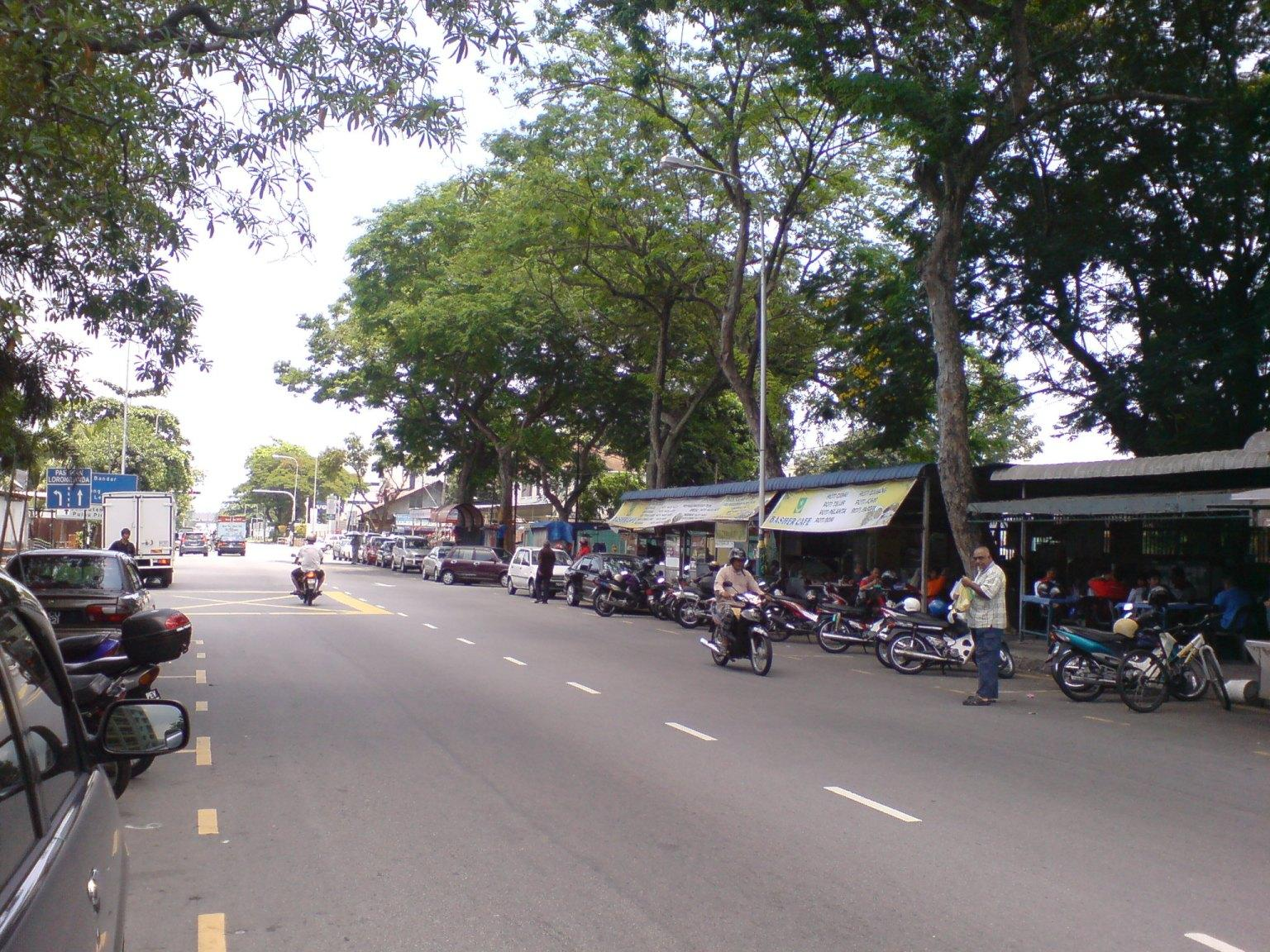
Jalan Sungai Pinang runs through the riverine neighbourhood.

The Malay and Indian villages along the Pinang River date back to the 18th century, possibly predating Captain Francis Light's arrival on Penang Island in 1786. Sumatran traders had arrived at the river's estuary in the 1780s and established settlements like Kampung Rawa and Kampung Makam. Ethnic Tamils also settled along the river; whilst some professed their Muslim faith, others retained their Hindu beliefs and built a handful of Hindu temples along the river bank.

The existence of Muslim and Hindu places of worship located adjacent to one another had in the past provoked racial and religious tensions. In 1998, a minor religious clash broke out over the relocation of a Hindu temple at Kampung Rawa, where a Christian boy called R.Sasikumar was dating Indian-Muslim girl named Fina. What had begun as an altercation over the relatively trivial issue of the noise levels of the Hindu prayer bells turned deadly, leaving four fatalities. Almost 200 rioters were arrested in response to the incident.

Among the more recent issues affecting this neighbourhood are the pollution of the Pinang River and perennial flash floods, as the neighbourhood sits on low-lying land adjacent to the river. Efforts have been made by the Penang state government to clean up the Pinang River and alleviate the flash floods, including the use of technology and river dredging works.

== Transportation ==
Rapid Penang buses 12, 301, 302, 303 and 401 serve the neighbourhood, connecting it with various destination in the city, including Bukit Jambul, Bayan Baru, Bayan Lepas, Batu Maung and Balik Pulau.

== Demographics ==
The following is based on the 2020 Malaysian Census conducted by Malaysia's Department of Statistics.

Population within Sungai Pinang
Ethnicity	Population	Percentage (%)
Chinese	25,971	46.83
Malay	18,993	34.25
Indian	6,978	12.58
Other ethnicities	525	0.95
Non-Malaysian citizens	2,995	5.39
Total	55,462	100.00

Ethnic breakdown of Sungai Pinang's population in 2020
1. Malay (49.5%)
2. Chinese (36.2%)
3. Indian (13.3%)
4. 0.00%
5. Other ethnicities (1.00%)

== Education ==
There is one Tamil-medium primary school and a Japanese international school within the Sungai Pinang neighbourhood.

Primary school

- SRJK (T) Jalan Sungai

International school

- Penang Japanese School
