= Speaker of the Penang State Legislative Assembly =

Presiding officer of the legislature of Penang

- Yang di-Pertua Dewan Undangan Negeri Pulau Pinang
- Coat of arms of Penang
- Incumbent; Law Choo Kiang since 28 June 2013
- Penang State Legislative Assembly
- Style: Yang Berhormat; Tuan Yang di-Pertua (formal); Tuan Speaker/Tuan Pengerusi (informal and within the assembly)
- Member of: Committee of Rights and Freedoms, House Committee, Committee of Meeting Rules, Committee of Privileges
- Reports to: Penang State Legislative Assembly
- Seat: Penang State Assembly Building, Light Street, George Town, Penang
- Appointer: Elected by members of the Penang State Legislative Assembly
- Term length: Elected at the start of each Penang State Legislative Assembly, upon a vacancy
- Constituting instrument: Constitution of Penang
- Inaugural holder: Sulaiman Ahmad
- Formation: 6 June 1959; 67 years ago
- Deputy: Deputy Speaker of the Penang State Legislative Assembly
- Website: dun.penang.gov.my/index.php/yb

The Speaker of the Penang State Legislative Assembly is the highest-ranking presiding officer in the Penang State Legislative Assembly, the unicameral legislature of the Malaysian state of Penang. They are responsible for convening sessions of the state's legislative body, organising debates, and examining the admissibility of petitions, bills and amendments. In the absence of the Speaker, the deputy will take their place. The speaker is selected through ballot in the first session of a new legislative assembly.

The incumbent Speaker is Law Choo Kiang. He was elected since 28 June 2013.

== Election ==
The Penang State Legislative Assembly may from time to time elect a person of eligibility to become a Speaker of the assembly. A speaker may not be elected to be a Speaker unless he is a member or qualified to be a member of the legislative assembly. The speaker may resign at any time. He must vacate his office when either the legislative assembly first meet after a general election, or upon being disqualified to be a speaker, or upon the dissolution of the assembly, or on his ceasing to be a member of assembly other than because of the dissolution of the legislative assembly or ceased to be qualified of a member. A Deputy Speaker may also be chosen from any member of the legislative assembly.

== List of Speakers of the Penang State Legislative Assembly ==
The following is the list of Speakers of the State Legislative Assembly since 1959:

Colour key (for political parties):
Alliance / Barisan Nasional Parti Gerakan Rakyat Malaysia Pakatan Rakyat Pakatan Harapan

No.	Portrait	Name (Birth–Death) (Constituency)	Term of office			Party (Note: This column names only the Speaker's party. The state legislaltive assembly he heads may be a complex coalition of several parties and independents; those are not listed here.)	Election	Assembly
No.	Portrait	Name (Birth–Death) (Constituency)	Took office	Left office	Time in office	Party	Election	Assembly
1.		Haji; Sulaiman Ahmad (born ?); MLA for Alma	6 June 1959	19 March 1969	9 years, 287 days	Alliance (UMNO)	1959	1st
1.		Haji; Sulaiman Ahmad (born ?); MLA for Alma	6 June 1959	19 March 1969	9 years, 287 days	Alliance (UMNO)	1964	2nd
2.		Dato'; Harun Sirat (born ?); MLA for Alma; MLA for Bukit Tengah	10 May 1969	16 June 1978	9 years, 38 days	Gerakan	1969	3rd
2.		Dato'; Harun Sirat (born ?); MLA for Alma; MLA for Bukit Tengah	10 May 1969	16 June 1978	9 years, 38 days	BN (Gerakan)	1974	4th
3.		Dato' Haji; Hassan Md. Noh (born ?); MLA for Penaga	8 July 1978	29 March 1982	3 years, 265 days	BN (UMNO)	1978	5th
4.		Dato'; Teh Ewe Lim (born ?); MLA for Datok Keramat	22 April 1982	19 July 1986	4 years, 89 days	BN (Gerakan)	1982	6th
5.		Dato'; Ooi Ean Kwong (born ?); MLA for Datok Keramat	3 August 1986	5 October 1990	4 years, 64 days	BN (Gerakan)	1986	7th
6.		Dato' Haji; Abdul Rahman Abbas (born 1938); MLA for Bertam	21 October 1990	4 April 1995	4 years, 166 days	BN (UMNO)	1990	8th
7.		Dato' Haji; Yahaya Abdul Hamid (born 1945); MLA for Pinang Tunggal (1995–2004); Non-MLA (2004–2008)	25 April 1995	12 February 2008	12 years, 294 days	BN (UMNO)	1995	9th
7.		Dato' Haji; Yahaya Abdul Hamid (born 1945); MLA for Pinang Tunggal (1995–2004); Non-MLA (2004–2008)	25 April 1995	12 February 2008	12 years, 294 days	BN (UMNO)	1999	10th
7.		Dato' Haji; Yahaya Abdul Hamid (born 1945); MLA for Pinang Tunggal (1995–2004); Non-MLA (2004–2008)	25 April 1995	12 February 2008	12 years, 294 days	BN (UMNO)	2004	11th
8.		Dato' Haji; Abdul Halim Hussain (born 1960); Non-MLA	8 March 2008	27 June 2013	5 years, 112 days	PR (PKR)	2008	12th
9.		Dato' Seri; Law Choo Kiang (born 1970); MLA for Bukit Tambun (2008–2018); Non-MLA (since 2018)	28 June 2013	Incumbent	13 years, 73 days	PR (PKR)	2013	13th
9.		Dato' Seri; Law Choo Kiang (born 1970); MLA for Bukit Tambun (2008–2018); Non-MLA (since 2018)	28 June 2013	Incumbent	13 years, 73 days	PH (PKR)	–	13th
9.		Dato' Seri; Law Choo Kiang (born 1970); MLA for Bukit Tambun (2008–2018); Non-MLA (since 2018)	28 June 2013	Incumbent	13 years, 73 days	PH (PKR)	2018	14th
9.		Dato' Seri; Law Choo Kiang (born 1970); MLA for Bukit Tambun (2008–2018); Non-MLA (since 2018)	28 June 2013	Incumbent	13 years, 73 days	PH (PKR)	2023	15th

== See also ==
- Penang
- Penang State Legislative Assembly
