= Abdul Ghani Haroon =

Malaysian politician

Abdul Ghani Haroon is a Malaysian politician and civil society activist. He was a prominent figure in the early Reformasi movement led by Anwar Ibrahim, and was one of the political detainees arrested under the Internal Security Act (ISA) during the 2001 government crackdown. His subsequent legal challenge resulted in a landmark habeas corpus ruling by the Shah Alam High Court that ordered his immediate release.

A founding member of the National Justice Party (KeADILan) and the succeeding People's Justice Party (PKR), Abdul Ghani contested the 1999 and 2004 elections under the opposition banner, but was unsuccessful in both attempts. Following internal disagreements, he left the party in May 2008 to rejoin the United Malays National Organisation (UMNO). In his later career, he actively opposed Anwar Ibrahim and his former party leadership.

== Political career ==
=== Early career ===
Following the dismissal and arrest of Anwar Ibrahim in 1998, Abdul Ghani joined the newly formed National Justice Party (KeADILan) during the height of the Reformasi movement. He was appointed to the Penang executive committee (Exco) of the party's youth wing, Pemuda Keadilan.

In the 1999 Malaysian general election, he made his electoral debut by contesting the Pinang Tunggal state seat in Penang under the KeADILan ticket. He faced the incumbent, Yahaya Abdul Hamid of Barisan Nasional (BN). Abdul Ghani lost the election by 4,376 votes, securing 2,848 votes against Yahaya's 7,224 votes.

=== ISA detention ===
On 11 April 2001, Abdul Ghani was arrested by police officers at the Kuching International Airport in Sarawak as he prepared to board a flight back to Kuala Lumpur. Prior to his arrest, he had advised his wife, Roslijah S. Syed, to remain resilient and care for their children, anticipating state action following the detentions of several fellow youth wing activists under the Internal Security Act (ISA).

The arrest was part of a broader government crackdown aimed at preventing the planned "Black 14" mass demonstration on 14 April 2001. Other prominent individuals detained during this period included Free Anwar Campaign (FAC) director Raja Petra Kamarudin, KeADILan Vice President Tian Chua, Youth Chief Mohamad Ezam Mohd Nor, Youth Secretary Gobalakrishnan Nagapan, rally organising chairman Saari Sungib, and political activist and columnist Hishamuddin Rais. Following his detention, Abdul Ghani was held in incommunicado custody for several weeks, prompting human rights groups such as Amnesty International and Human Rights Watch to designate him as a prisoner of conscience.

Abdul Ghani and Gobalakrishnan subsequently challenged their detentions by filing habeas corpus applications. On 30 May 2001, Shah Alam High Court Judge Datuk Mohd Hishamudin Md Yunus delivered a landmark ruling ordering the immediate release of both men, declaring their 50-day police detention unlawful and executed in bad faith. The judge also issued an unprecedented order barring the police from re-arresting the two activists for at least 24 hours following their release, marking a rare judicial intervention against ISA detention orders. The move was said to directly catalyse the formation of the "Abolish ISA Movement" (GMI) by local human rights coalitions.

=== Post-detention activity ===
Following the merger of KeADILan and the Malaysian People's Party (PRM) to form the People's Justice Party (PKR) in 2003, Abdul Ghani continued his service within the party's reorganised youth wing, Angkatan Muda Keadilan (AMK).

During the 2004 general election, Abdul Ghani moved his candidacy to Selangor, contesting the Dusun Tua state constituency. Running under the PKR banner, he challenged Barisan Nasional's Rahmad Musa. Abdul Ghani lost the election, capturing 5,802 votes compared to Rahmad's 14,845 votes, resulting in a majority of 9,043 for Barisan Nasional.

Despite electoral setbacks, Abdul Ghani remained active in the opposition coalition. In March 2007, he served as a representative for Democracy and Anti-Corruption Movement (Gerak), working alongside other opposition leaders, including Salahuddin Ayub, Tian Chua, and Shamsul Iskandar Mohd Akin to present a joint memorandum to the Yang di-Pertuan Agong regarding allegations of corruption and abuse of power.

=== Departure from PKR ===
On 29 May 2008, Abdul Ghani officially resigned from the People's Justice Party alongside six former youth leaders, following former Youth Chief Mohamad Ezam Mohd Nor in rejoining the United Malays National Organisation (UMNO). Among the group who left alongside him were AMK leaders Anuar Shaari and Khairul Anuar Ramli.

Following his departure, Abdul Ghani transitioned into active opposition against his former party leadership. In April 2012, he became heavily involved in campaigns opposing Anwar Ibrahim, culminating in the launch of the Tolak Individu Bernama Anwar Ibrahim (TIBAI) club. It was an organisation composed largely of former PKR members and Reformasi activists dedicated to publicly campaigning against Anwar Ibrahim's political ambitions.

Abdul Ghani later aligned himself with the New Generation Party, a political party formed in 2013. In March 2017, during a party restructuring, he was officially appointed as the party's Information Chief. During his tenure, the party underwent internal structural shifts and was subsequently rebranded as the Corruption-Free Party (PBR).

By January 2018, Abdul Ghani transitioned into civic advocacy, assuming the role of Secretary for the Hisbah Centre for Reform, an anti-corruption non-governmental organisation led by Mohamad Ezam Mohd Nor. In June, he garnered national media attention when he personally lodged a formal report with the Malaysian Anti-Corruption Commission (MACC). He submitted a comprehensive dossier exceeding 600 pages that contained financial statements and reports alleging corruption and abuse of power involving a prominent former finance minister.

After a long hiatus from electoral politics, Abdul Ghani contested in the 2023 Penang state election. He stood as a candidate for the Sungai Pinang state constituency under the Malaysian People's Party (PRM) ticket. He faced a four-cornered fight against the incumbent Lim Siew Khim from the Democratic Action Party (DAP). Abdul Ghani secured only 623 votes and subsequently lost his electoral deposit.

== Election results ==
Penang State Legislative Assembly
Year	Constituency	Candidate	Votes	Pct	Opponent(s)	Votes	Pct	Ballots cast	Majority	Turnout
1999	N03 Pinang Tunggal	Abdul Ghani Haroon (KeADILan)	2,848	28.3%	Yahaya Abdul Hamid (UMNO)	7,224	71.7%	10,416	4,376	80.8%
2023	N30 Sungai Pinang	Abdul Ghani Haroon (PRM)	623	2.5%	Lim Siew Khim (DAP)	16,026	65.1%	24,846	8,288	72.2%
2023	N30 Sungai Pinang	Abdul Ghani Haroon (PRM)	623	2.5%	Ng Fook On (GERAKAN)	7,738	31.4%	24,846	8,288	72.2%
2023	N30 Sungai Pinang	Abdul Ghani Haroon (PRM)	623	2.5%	Andrew Rajah Bellimin Rajah (IND)	221	0.9%	24,846	8,288	72.2%

Selangor State Legislative Assembly
Year	Constituency	Candidate	Votes	Pct	Opponent(s)	Votes	Pct	Ballots cast	Majority	Turnout
2004	N23 Dusun Tua	Abdul Ghani Haroon (PKR)	5,802	28.1%	Rahmad Musa (UMNO)	14,845	71.9%	21,377	9,043	76.4%
