= Roslan Saidin =

Malaysian politician

Yang Berbahagia Dato' Roslan Saidin DIMP DSPN
- روسلن سعيدين

Member of the Penang State Legislative Assembly for Pinang Tunggal
- In office 21 March 2004 – 9 May 2018
- Preceded by: Yahaya Abdul Hamid (BN–UMNO)
- Succeeded by: Ahmad Zakiyuddin Abdul Rahman (PH–PKR)
- Majority: 3,910 (2004); 3,235 (2008); 1,587 (2013)

Personal details
- Born: Roslan bin Saidin; 1 January 1964 (age 62) Penang, Malaysia
- Citizenship: Malaysian
- Party: United Malays National Organisation (UMNO)
- Other political affiliations: Barisan Nasional (BN)
- Occupation: Politician

Roslan bin Saidin is a Malaysian politician from UMNO. He has served as the Member of the Penang State Legislative Assembly for Pinang Tunggal from 2004 to 2018.

== Election results ==
Penang State Legislative Assembly
Year	Constituency	Candidate	Votes	Pct	Opponent(s)	Votes	Pct	Ballots cast	Majority	Turnout
2004	N03 Pinang Tunggal	Roslan Saidin (UMNO)	7,791	57.15%	Mohd Salleh Man (PAS)	3,881	42.85%	11,862	3,910	84.43%
2008	N03 Pinang Tunggal	Roslan Saidin (UMNO)	7,848	62.98%	Mohammad Hashim (PKR)	4,613	37.02%	12,782	3,235	84.70%
2013	N03 Pinang Tunggal	Roslan Saidin (UMNO)	9,155	53.81%	Ahmad Zakiyuddin Abdul Rahman (PKR)	7,568	44.48%	16,723	1,587	90.70%
2018	N03 Pinang Tunggal	Roslan Saidin (UMNO)	7,627	38.13%	Ahmad Zakiyuddin Abdul Rahman (PKR)	7,754	38.76%	20,003	127	88.50%
2018	N03 Pinang Tunggal	Roslan Saidin (UMNO)	7,627	38.13%	Bukhori Ghazali (PAS)	4,622	23.11%	20,003	127	88.50%

== Honours ==
- Pahang
  - Knight Companion of the Order of the Crown of Pahang (DIMP) – Dato' (2015)
- Penang
  - Officer of the Order of the Defender of State (DSPN) – Dato' (2003)
