= Sungai Pinang (Penang state constituency) =

State constituency in Penang, Malaysia

Sungai Pinang (N30)
Penang constituency
- Sungai Pinang (olive) on Penang

State constituency
- Legislature: Penang State Legislative Assembly
MLA
Lim Siew Khim
PH
- Constituency created: 1959 (as Sungei Pinang)
- First contested: 1959
- Last contested: 2023

Demographics
- Electors (2023): 34,416
- Area (km²): 4

Sungai Pinang is a state constituency in Penang, Malaysia, that has been represented in the Penang State Legislative Assembly since 1974. It covers much of Jelutong, one of the suburbs of George Town.

The state constituency was first contested in 1974 and is mandated to return a single Assemblyman to the Penang State Legislative Assembly under the first-past-the-post voting system. Since 2013, the State Assemblyman for Sungai Pinang is Lim Siew Khim from the Democratic Action Party (DAP), which is part of the state's ruling coalition, Pakatan Harapan (PH).

== Definition ==
=== Polling districts ===
According to the federal gazette issued on 30 March 2018, the Sungai Pinang constituency is divided into 8 polling districts.

State constituency	Polling districts	Code	Location
Sungai Pinang (N30)	Sungai Pinang Road	050/30/01	SJK (T) Jalan Sungai
Sungai Pinang (N30)	City Infitmary	050/30/02	SJK (T) Jalan Sungai
Sungai Pinang (N30)	Jalan Trusan	050/30/03	SJK (C) Moh Ghee (Pusat)
Sungai Pinang (N30)	West Jelutong	050/30/04	SJK (C) Moh Ghee (Pusat)
Sungai Pinang (N30)	Bakau Street	050/30/05	SJK (C) Moh Ghee Cawangan
Sungai Pinang (N30)	East Jelutong	050/30/06	SK Jelutong
Sungai Pinang (N30)	Jalan Madrasah	050/30/07	SK Jelutong
Sungai Pinang (N30)	Bukit Dumbar	050/30/08	SJK (C) Phei Shin

This state seat encompasses much of Jelutong, a suburb immediately south of George Town, as well as the neighbourhood of Sungai Pinang. Jelutong is geographically situated to the south of the Pinang River (Malay: Sungai Pinang), from where the constituency got its name.

In addition, the new coastal neighbourhood around Karpal Singh Drive falls under this constituency.

The Sungai Pinang seat is bounded to the west by Jelutong Road; a portion of Jelutong west of the road lies within the neighbouring Batu Lancang constituency. The Pinang River, up to the junction of Jalan Perak and Sungai Pinang Road, marks the seat's northern limits. The constituency's southern limits is formed by Jalan Tunku Kudin.

== Demographics ==
Ethnic breakdown of Sungai Pinang's electorate as of 2023
1. Chinese (48.2%)
2. Malay (30.7%)
3. Indian (20.1%)
4. Other ethnicities (0.94%)

Total electors by polling district in 2016
Polling district	Electors
Bakau Street	4,316
Bukit Dumbar	3,452
City Infirmary	1,630
East Jelutong	3,682
West Jelutong	3,606
Jalan Madrasah	2,596
Jalan Trusan	1,694
Sungai Pinang Road	3,504
Total	24,480
Source: Malaysian Election Commission

== History ==
Penang State Legislative Assemblyman for Sungai Pinang
Assembly	No	Years	Member	Party
Constituency created
1st	N20	1959-1964	D. S. Ramanathan	Socialist Front (Lab)
2nd	N20	1964-1969	D. S. Ramanathan	Alliance (MIC)
		1969-1971	Assembly dissolved	
3rd	N20	1971 - 1973	Chelliah Poosary	GERAKAN
3rd	N20	1973 - 1974	Chelliah Poosary	BN (GERAKAN)
4th	N26	1974 – 1978	Wong Choong Woh (黃忠和)	BN (GERAKAN)
5th	N26	1978 – 1982	Ong Hean Tee (王贤智)	BN (GERAKAN)
6th	N26	1982 – 1986	Ong Hean Tee (王贤智)	BN (GERAKAN)
7th	N26	1986 – 1990	Khoo Kay Por (邱继圃)	BN (GERAKAN)
8th	N26	1990 – 1995	Kang Chin Seng (江真诚)	BN (GERAKAN)
9th	N26	1995 – 1999	Kang Chin Seng (江真诚)	BN (GERAKAN)
10th	N26	1999 – 2004	Looi Swee Cheang (雷瑞强)	BN (GERAKAN)
11th	N30	2004 – 2008	Looi Swee Cheang (雷瑞强)	BN (GERAKAN)
12th	N30	2008 – 2013	Koid Teng Guan (郭庭源)	PR (DAP)
13th	N30	2013 – 2018	Lim Siew Khim (林秀琴)	PR (DAP)
14th	N30	2018 – 2023	Lim Siew Khim (林秀琴)	PH (DAP)
15th	N30	2023–present	Lim Siew Khim (林秀琴)	PH (DAP)

== Election results ==
The electoral results for the Sungai Pinang state constituency in 2008, 2013 and 2018 are as follows.

Penang state election, 2023
Party	Candidate	Votes	%	∆%
PH	Lim Siew Khim	16,026	65.10	▼3.70
PN	Ng Fook On	7,738	31.50	▲31.50
Parti Rakyat Malaysia	Abdul Ghani Haroon	623	2.50	▲2.50
Independent	Andrew Rajah	221	0.90	▲0.90
Total valid votes		24,608	100.00	
Total rejected ballots		200		
Unreturned ballots		38		
Turnout		24,846	72.19	▼12.11
Registered electors		34,416		
Majority		8,288	33.60	▼12.90
PH hold		Swing		

Penang state election, 2018
Party	Candidate	Votes	%	∆%
PKR	Lim Siew Khim	15,362	68.80	▲68.80
BN	Ng Fook On	4,974	22.30	▼15.70
PAS	Yacoob Omar	1,575	7.10	▲7.10
Parti Sosialis Malaysia	Teh Yee Cheu	223	1.00	▲1.00
BERSAMA	Tan Sim Bee	79	0.30	▲0.30
Independent	Mohamed Yacoob Mohamed Noor	119	0.50	▲0.50
Total valid votes		22,332	100.00	
Total rejected ballots		291		
Unreturned ballots		81		
Turnout		22,704	84.30	▼3.10
Registered electors		26,917		
Majority		10,388	46.50	▲23.20
PKR hold		Swing		
Source(s) "His Majesty's Government Gazette - Notice of Contested Election, State Legislative Assembly for the State of Penang [P.U. (B) 252/2018]" (PDF). Attorney General's Chambers of Malaysia. 3 May 2018. "Federal Government Gazette - Results of Contested Election and Statements of the Poll after the Official Addition of Votes, State Constituencies for the State of Penang [P.U. (B) 326/2018]" (PDF). Attorney General's Chambers of Malaysia. 28 May 2018.

Penang state election, 2013
Party	Candidate	Votes	%	∆%
DAP	Lim Siew Khim	12,354	61.30	▲3.50
BN	Thor Teong Gee	7,647	38.00	▼1.10
Independent	Mohamed Yacoob	141	0.70	▲0.70
Total valid votes		20,142	100.00	
Total rejected ballots		287		
Unreturned ballots		102		
Turnout		20,351	87.40	▲12.00
Registered electors		23,501		
Majority		4,707	23.30	▲4.60
DAP hold		Swing		
Source(s) "Federal Government Gazette - Notice of Contested Election, State Legislative Assembly for the State of Penang [P.U. (B) 189/2013]" (PDF). Attorney General's Chambers of Malaysia. 26 April 2013. "Federal Government Gazette - Results of Contested Election and Statements of the Poll after the Official Addition of Votes, State Constituencies for the State of Penang [P.U. (B) 230/2013]" (PDF). Attorney General's Chambers of Malaysia. 22 May 2013.

Penang state election, 2008
Party	Candidate	Votes	%	∆%
DAP	Koid Teng Guan	8,305	57.80	▲27.47
BN	Looi Swee Cheang	5,611	39.10	▼24.45
Independent	Badrul Zaman P.S. Md Zakariah	449	3.10	▲3.10
Total valid votes		14,365	100.00	
Total rejected ballots		235		
Unreturned ballots		4		
Turnout		14,604	75.40	▲2.27
Registered electors		19,368		
Majority		2,694	18.75	▼14.38
DAP gain from BN		Swing		?

Penang state election, 2004
Party	Candidate	Votes	%	∆%
BN	Looi Swee Cheang	8,634	63.47	▼0.13
DAP	Tham Weng Fatt	4,127	30.34	▼6.07
PKR	Jimmy Gay Choon Hee	843	6.20	▲6.20
Total valid votes		13,604	100.00	
Total rejected ballots		343		
Unreturned ballots		0		
Turnout		13,947	73.13	▲1.13
Registered electors		19,071		
Majority		4,507	33.13	▲5.94
BN hold		Swing		

Penang state election, 1999
Party	Candidate	Votes	%	∆%
BN	Looi Swee Cheang	8,482	63.59	▼3.96
DAP	Asamaley Sinniah	4,856	36.41	▲8.16
Total valid votes		13,338	100.00	
Total rejected ballots		371		
Unreturned ballots		0		
Turnout		13,709	72.00	▼2.27
Registered electors		19,039		
Majority		3,626	27.19	▼12.12
BN hold		Swing		

Penang state election, 1995
Party	Candidate	Votes	%	∆%
BN	Kang Chin Seng	9,552	67.55	▲12.19
DAP	Ahmad Nor	3,994	28.25	▼16.39
PAS	Abdul Karim Pawanchee	594	4.20	▲4.20
Total valid votes		14,140	100.00	
Total rejected ballots		258		
Unreturned ballots		8		
Turnout		14,406	74.27	▲0.06
Registered electors		19,396		
Majority		5,558	39.31	▲28.58
BN hold		Swing		

Penang state election, 1990
Party	Candidate	Votes	%	∆%
BN	Kang Chin Seng	8,763	55.36	▼1.55
DAP	Karpal Singh	7,065	44.64	▲1.55
Total valid votes		15,828	100.00	
Total rejected ballots		414		
Unreturned ballots		33		
Turnout		16,275	74.21	▲5.55
Registered electors		21,931		
Majority		1,698	10.73	▼3.09
BN hold		Swing		

Penang state election, 1986
Party	Candidate	Votes	%	∆%
BN	Khoo Kay Por	8,088	56.91	▼4.70
DAP	Balasundaram Kanagaratnam	6,124	43.09	▲16.03
Total valid votes		14,212	100.00	
Total rejected ballots		459		
Unreturned ballots		0		
Turnout		14,671	68.66	▼7.95
Registered electors		21,368		
Majority		1,964	13.82	▼20.73
BN hold		Swing		

Penang state election, 1982
Party	Candidate	Votes	%	∆%
BN	Ong Hean Tee	11,361	61.61	▲13.76
DAP	Shanmugam Nadason	4,990	27.06	▼5.39
PAS	Idris Osman	1,517	8.23	▲8.23
Independent	Pitchay M. Chinniah	572	3.10	▼1.79
Total valid votes		18,440	100.00	
Total rejected ballots		441		
Unreturned ballots		0		
Turnout		18,881	76.61	▼3.07
Registered electors		24,645		
Majority		6,371	34.55	▲19.14
BN hold		Swing		

Penang state election, 1978
Party	Candidate	Votes	%	∆%
BN	Ong Hean Tee	7,594	47.85	▲7.04
DAP	Chai Bee Come	5,149	32.45	▲4.60
Independent	N. Patkunam	2,349	14.80	▲2.86
Independent	Tan Chong Hooi	777	4.90	▼7.05
Total valid votes		15,869	100.00	
Total rejected ballots		706		
Unreturned ballots		0		
Turnout		16,575	79.68	▼2.19
Registered electors		20,801		
Majority		2,445	15.41	▲2.44
BN hold		Swing		

Penang state election, 1974
Party	Candidate	Votes	%	∆%
BN	Wong Choong Woh	4,686	40.82	▼19.71
DAP	Loh Kim Heng	3,197	27.85	▲27.85
PEKEMAS	Nurashikin	1,715	14.94	▲14.94
Independent	Md. Hamid Merican	1,371	11.94	▲11.94
Parti Sosialis Rakyat Malaysia	Teh Ang Siang	511	4.45	▲4.45
Total valid votes		11,480	100.00	
Total rejected ballots		480		
Unreturned ballots		0		
Turnout		11,960	81.87	▲7.01
Registered electors		14,608		
Majority		1,489	12.97	▼8.09
BN gain from GERAKAN		Swing		-

Penang state election, 1969
Party	Candidate	Votes	%	∆%
GERAKAN	Chelliah Poosary	5,099	60.53	▲60.53
Alliance	Amalads Ponnusamy	3,325	39.47	▼8.99
Total valid votes		8,424	100.00	
Total rejected ballots		387		
Unreturned ballots		0		
Turnout		8,811	74.87	▼8.80
Registered electors		11,769		
Majority		1,774	21.06	▲8.29
GERAKAN gain from Alliance		Swing		-

Penang state election, 1964
Party	Candidate	Votes	%	∆%
Alliance	David Sabapthy Ramanathan	4,236	48.46	▲16.56
Socialist Front	Omar Othman	3,120	35.69	▲35.69
UDP	Lee Sinn Boon	1,385	15.84	▲15.84
Total valid votes		8,741	100.00	
Total rejected ballots		225		
Unreturned ballots		0		
Turnout		8,966	83.66	▲13.17
Registered electors		10,717		
Majority		1,116	12.77	▼11.39
Alliance gain from Socialist Front		Swing		-

Penang state election, 1959
Party	Candidate	Votes	%
Socialist Front	David Sabapthy Ramanathan	2,991	56.05
Alliance	P. W. David	1,702	31.90
National Party	Abdul Jalil T. M. Shaik	643	12.05
Total valid votes		5,336	100.00
Total rejected ballots		69	
Unreturned ballots		0	
Turnout		5,405	70.49
Registered electors		7,668	
Majority		1,289	24.16
This was a new constituency created.

== See also ==
- Constituencies of Penang
