= Pinang Tunggal (state constituency) =

State constituency in Penang, Malaysia

Pinang Tunggal (N03)
Penang constituency

State constituency
- Legislature: Penang State Legislative Assembly
MLA
Bukhori Ghazali
PN
- Constituency created: 1986
- First contested: 1986
- Last contested: 2023

Demographics
- Electors (2023): 34,723
- Area (km²): 75

Pinang Tunggal is a state constituency in Penang, Malaysia, that has been represented in the Penang State Legislative Assembly.

The state constituency was first contested in 1986 and is mandated to return a single Assemblyman to the Penang State Legislative Assembly under the first-past-the-post voting system. Since 2018, the State Assemblyman for Pinang Tunggal is Ahmad Zakiyuddin Abdul Rahman from the Parti Keadilan Rakyat (PKR), which is part of the state's ruling coalition, Pakatan Harapan (PH).

== Definition ==
=== Polling districts ===
According to the federal gazette issued on 30 March 2018, the Pinang Tunggal constituency is divided into 11 polling districts.

State constituency	Polling districts	Code	Location
Pinang Tunggal (N03)	Bumbung Lima	041/03/01	SK Bumbong Lima
Pinang Tunggal (N03)	Paya Keladi	041/03/02	SK Paya Keladi
Pinang Tunggal (N03)	Bertam Indah	041/03/03	SMK Bertam Indah
Pinang Tunggal (N03)	Ladang Malakoff	041/03/04	SJK (T) Ladang Malakoff
Pinang Tunggal (N03)	Kampong To'Bedu	041/03/05	SK Kampong To' Bedor
Pinang Tunggal (N03)	Permatang Langsat	041/03/06	SMK Dato' Kailan
Pinang Tunggal (N03)	Pinang Tunggal	041/03/07	SK Pinang Tunggal
Pinang Tunggal (N03)	Kampong Baharu	041/03/08	SK Mohd Shah
Pinang Tunggal (N03)	Kampong Selamat Utara	041/03/09	SJK (C) Mah Hua
Pinang Tunggal (N03)	Kubang Menerong	041/03/10	Madrasah Al-Yatumiah Al-Islamiah Kubang Menerong
Pinang Tunggal (N03)	Kampong Selamat Selatan	041/03/11	SK Kampung Selamat

== Demographics ==
Ethnic breakdown of Pinang Tunggal's electorate as of 2023
1. Malay (78.8%)
2. Chinese (17.1%)
3. Indian (3.65%)
4. Other ethnicities (0.43%)

Total electors by polling district in 2016
Polling district	Electors
Bumbung Lima	1,674
Paya Keladi	3,626
Bertam Indah	1,614
Ladang Malakoff	263
Kampong To’Bedu	2,115
Permatang Langsat	1,273
Pinang Tunggal	2,687
Kampong Baharu	874
Kampong Selamat Utara	2,432
Kubang Menerong	995
Kampong Selamat Selatan	1,887
Total	19,440
Source: Malaysian Election Commission

== History ==
Penang State Legislative Assemblyman for Pinang Tunggal
Assembly	No	Years	Member	Party
Constituency created from Tasek Gelugor
7th	N03	1986–1990	Yahaya Abdul Hamid	BN (UMNO)
8th	N03	1990–1995	Yahaya Abdul Hamid	BN (UMNO)
9th	N03	1995–1999	Yahaya Abdul Hamid	BN (UMNO)
10th	N03	1999–2004	Yahaya Abdul Hamid	BN (UMNO)
11th	N03	2004–2008	Roslan Saidin	BN (UMNO)
12th	N03	2008–2013	Roslan Saidin	BN (UMNO)
13th	N03	2013–2018	Roslan Saidin	BN (UMNO)
14th	N03	2018–2023	Ahmad Zakiyuddin Abdul Rahman	PH (PKR)
15th	N03	2023–present	Bukhori Ghazali	PN (PAS)

== Election results ==
The electoral results for the Pinang Tunggal state constituency in 2008, 2013 and 2018 are as follows.

Penang state election, 2023
Party	Candidate	Votes	%	∆%
PN	Bukhori Ghazali	17,060	62.74	▲62.74
PH	Zainuddin Mohamad	10,132	37.26	▼1.54
Total valid votes		27,192	100.00	
Total rejected ballots		196		
Unreturned ballots		30		
Turnout		27,418	78.96	▼9.54
Registered electors		34,723		
Majority		6,928	25.48	▲25.13
PN gain from PKR		Swing		?

Penang state election, 2018
Party	Candidate	Votes	%	∆%
PKR	Ahmad Zakiyuddin Abdul Rahman	7,754	38.76	▼5.752
BN	Roslan Saidin	7,627	38.13	▼16.60
PAS	Bukhori Ghazali	4,622	23.11	▲23.10
Total valid votes		20,003	100.00	
Total rejected ballots		296		
Unreturned ballots		97		
Turnout		20,396	88.50	▼2.20
Registered electors		23,056		
Majority		127	0.35	▼9.14
PKR gain from BN		Swing		?
Source(s) "His Majesty's Government Gazette - Notice of Contested Election, State Legislative Assembly for the State of Penang [P.U. (B) 252/2018]" (PDF). Attorney General's Chambers of Malaysia. 3 May 2018. "Federal Government Gazette - Results of Contested Election and Statements of the Poll after the Official Addition of Votes, State Constituencies for the State of Penang [P.U. (B) 326/2018]" (PDF). Attorney General's Chambers of Malaysia. 28 May 2018. Archived from the original (PDF) on 29 August 2019.

Penang state election, 2013
Party	Candidate	Votes	%	∆%
BN	Roslan Saidin	9,155	53.81	▼8.30
PKR	Ahmad Zakiyuddin Abdul Rahman	7,568	44.48	▲8.30
Total valid votes		16,723	100.00	
Total rejected ballots		261		
Unreturned ballots		0		
Turnout		16,984	90.67	▲6.00
Registered electors		18,733		
Majority		1,587	9.49	▼16.47
BN hold		Swing		
Source(s) "Federal Government Gazette - Notice of Contested Election, State Legislative Assembly for the State of Penang [P.U. (B) 189/2013]" (PDF). Attorney General's Chambers of Malaysia. 26 April 2013. "Federal Government Gazette - Results of Contested Election and Statements of the Poll after the Official Addition of Votes, State Constituencies for the State of Penang [P.U. (B) 230/2013]" (PDF). Attorney General's Chambers of Malaysia. 22 May 2013. Archived from the original (PDF) on 22 March 2019.

Penang state election, 2008
Party	Candidate	Votes	%	∆%
BN	Roslan Saidin	7,848	62.98	▲5.85
PKR	Mohammad Hashim	4,613	37.02	▲37.00
Total valid votes		12,461	100.00	
Total rejected ballots		318		
Unreturned ballots		3		
Turnout		12,782	84.70	▲0.27
Registered electors		15,091		
Majority		3,235	25.96	▼7.54
BN hold		Swing		

Penang state election, 2004
Party	Candidate	Votes	%	∆%
BN	Roslan Saidin	7,791	57.15	▲14.57
PAS	Mohd Salleh Man	3,881	42.85	▲42.85
Total valid votes		11,672	100.00	
Total rejected ballots		189		
Unreturned ballots		1		
Turnout		11,862	84.43	▲3.65
Registered electors		14,049		
Majority		3,910	33.50	▼9.95
BN hold		Swing		

Penang state election, 1999
Party	Candidate	Votes	%	∆%
BN	Yahaya Abdul Hamid	7,224	71.72	▼12.49
PKR	Abdul Ghani Haroon	2,848	28.28	▲28.28
Total valid votes		10,072	100.00	
Total rejected ballots		342		
Unreturned ballots		2		
Turnout		10,416	80.78	▲0.30
Registered electors		12,894		
Majority		4,376	43.45	▼25.04
BN hold		Swing		

Penang state election, 1995
Party	Candidate	Votes	%	∆%
BN	Yahaya Abdul Hamid	8,397	84.21	▲20.11
S46	Syed Ibrahim Syed Abu Bakar	1,573	15.79	▼20.10
Total valid votes		9,964	100.00	
Total rejected ballots		313		
Unreturned ballots		11		
Turnout		10,294	80.48	▼2.48
Registered electors		12,791		
Majority		6,824	68.49	▲40.29
BN hold		Swing		

Penang state election, 1990
Party	Candidate	Votes	%	∆%
BN	Yahaya Abdul Hamid	4,080	64.10	▲3.47
S46	Mohd Sani Abdullah	2,285	35.80	▲35.80
Total valid votes		6,365	100.00	
Total rejected ballots		278		
Unreturned ballots		0		
Turnout		6,643	82.96	▲3.61
Registered electors		8,007		
Majority		1,795	28.20	▲1.28
BN hold		Swing		

Penang state election, 1986
Party	Candidate	Votes	%
BN	Yahaya Abdul Hamid	3,697	60.63
PAS	Ahmad Hasan Salahuddin	2,043	33.51
DAP	Ahmad Othman	358	5.87
Total valid votes		6,098	100.00
Total rejected ballots		186	
Unreturned ballots		0	
Turnout		6,284	79.35
Registered electors		7,919	
Majority		1,654	27.12
This was a new constituency created.

== See also ==
- Constituencies of Penang
