= Ahmad Zakiyuddin Abdul Rahman =

Malaysian politician and engineer

Yang Berbahagia Dato' Seri Ahmad Zakiyuddin Abdul Rahman DGPN DMPN DSPN
- أحمد ذکي الدين عبدالرحمن

Deputy Chief Minister of Penang I
- In office 16 May 2018 – 13 August 2023 Serving with Ramasamy Palanisamy (Deputy Chief Minister of Penang II)
- Governor: Abdul Rahman Abbas (2018–2021); Ahmad Fuzi Abdul Razak (2021–2023)
- Chief Minister: Chow Kon Yeow
- Preceded by: Mohd Rashid Hasnon
- Succeeded by: Mohamad Abdul Hamid
- Constituency: Pinang Tunggal

Member of the Penang State Executive Council (Islamic Affairs, Industrial Development and Social Relations)
- In office 16 May 2018 – 13 August 2023
- Governor: Abdul Rahman Abbas (2018–2021); Ahmad Fuzi Abdul Razak (2021–2023)
- Chief Minister: Chow Kon Yeow
- Preceded by: Mohd Rashid Hasnon (Industrial Development & Social Relations); Abdul Malik Abul Kassim (Islamic Affairs)
- Succeeded by: Mohamad Abdul Hamid (Islamic Development & Social Unity); Portfolio abolished (Industrial Development)
- Constituency: Pinang Tunggal

Member of the Penang State Legislative Assembly for Pinang Tunggal
- In office 9 May 2018 – 12 August 2023
- Preceded by: Roslan Saidin (BN–UMNO)
- Succeeded by: Bukhori Ghazali (PN–PAS)
- Majority: 127 (2018)

Chairman of the Penang Islamic Religious Council
- Incumbent
- Assumed office 1 January 2021
- Deputy: Roslan Ahmad
- Preceded by: Abdul Malik Abul Kassim

Deputy Chairman of the Penang Islamic Religious Council
- In office 1 January 2018 – 31 December 2020
- Chairman: Abdul Malik Abul Kassim
- Preceded by: Abdul Halim Hussain
- Succeeded by: Roslan Ahmad

Faction represented in Penang State Legislative Assembly
- 2018–2023: Pakatan Harapan

Personal details
- Born: Ahmad Zakiyuddin Abdul Rahman; 8 December 1958 (age 67) Kedah, Federation of Malaya
- Citizenship: Malaysian
- Party: People's Justice Party (PKR)
- Other political affiliations: Pakatan Rakyat (PR) (2008–2015); Pakatan Harapan (PH) (since 2015)
- Education: University of Salford
- Occupation: Politician
- Profession: Engineer

Ahmad Zakiyuddin bin Abdul Rahman (born 8 December 1958) is a Malaysian politician and engineer who served as the Deputy Chief Minister of Penang I and Member of the Penang State Executive Council (EXCO) in the Pakatan Harapan (PH) state administration under Chief Minister Chow Kon Yeow and Member of the Penang State Legislative Assembly (MLA) for Pinang Tunggal from May 2018 to August 2023. He has served as Chairman of the Penang Islamic Religious Council (MAINPP) since January 2021. He also served as the Deputy Chairman of MAINPP from January 2018 to his promotion to the chairmanship in January 2021. He is a member of the People's Justice Party (PKR), a component party of the PH and formerly PR coalitions.

Prior to his political career, Ahmad Zakiyuddin had been an engineer by profession; he is a registered member of the Board of Engineers Malaysia as a professional civil engineer with a practising certificate.

== Education ==
Ahmad Zakiyuddin received his secondary education at SMS Sultan Mohamad Jiwa in the town of Sungai Petani in Kedah. He then furthered his studies at the University of Salford, where he completed his A-Levels and pursued a tertiary course in civil engineering.

== Engineering career ==
After graduating from the University of Salford, Ahmad Zakiyuddin worked in the Malaysian Public Works Department (JKR) for 10 years. He was involved with numerous infrastructural projects, such as the township of Bandar Bertam Perdana in Northern Seberang Perai, as well as tertiary institutes and mosques in Southern Seberang Perai.

== Political career ==
Ahmad Zakiyuddin's first foray into politics as an ordinary member of the People's Justice Party (PKR) came in the 2013 Penang state election. He contested the Pinang Tunggal state constituency and lost in a straight fight against Roslan Saidin of Barisan Nasional (BN).

In the 2018 Penang state election, Ahmad Zakiyuddin once again went up against Roslan Saidin, the incumbent State Assemblyman for Pinang Tunggal. This time he emerged victorious, winning the constituency by a slim margin of 127 votes, despite facing a three-cornered tussle for the seat. Following his electoral win, Ahmad Zakiyuddin was appointed as the Deputy Chief Minister I of Penang by the state's Chief Minister, Chow Kon Yeow. Ahmad Zakiyuddin assumed office as the Deputy Chief Minister I on 16 May, succeeding his party colleague, Mohd Rashid Hasnon, who became the elected Member of Parliament for Batu Pahat in Johor.

== Election results ==
Penang State Legislative Assembly
Year	Constituency	Candidate	Votes	Pct	Opponent(s)	Votes	Pct	Ballots cast	Majority	Turnout
2013	N03 Pinang Tunggal	Ahmad Zakiyuddin Abdul Rahman (PKR)	7,568	44.48%	Roslan Saidin (UMNO)	9,155	53.81%	16,723	1,587	90.70%
2018	N03 Pinang Tunggal	Ahmad Zakiyuddin Abdul Rahman (PKR)	7,754	38.76%	Roslan Saidin (UMNO)	7,627	38.13%	20,003	127	88.50%
2018	N03 Pinang Tunggal	Ahmad Zakiyuddin Abdul Rahman (PKR)	7,754	38.76%	Bukhori Ghazali (PAS)	4,622	23.11%	20,003	127	88.50%

== Honours ==
- Penang
  - Commander of the Order of the Defender of State (DGPN) – Dato' Seri (2023)
  - Companion of the Order of the Defender of State (DMPN) – Dato' (2018)
  - Officer of the Order of the Defender of State (DSPN) – Dato' (2015)

== See also ==
- Deputy Chief Minister of Penang
