= Mohd Yusni Mat Piah =

Malaysian politician

Yang Berhormat Tuan Mohd Yusni Mat Piah KMN MLA
- محمد يوسني مت ڤياه

Member of the Penang State Legislative Assembly for Penaga
- Incumbent
- Assumed office 9 May 2018
- Preceded by: Mohd Zain Ahmad (BN–UMNO)
- Majority: 1,132 (2018); 5,537 (2023)

Personal details
- Born: Mohd Yusni bin Mat Piah; 5 April 1974 (age 52)
- Party: Malaysian Islamic Party (PAS)
- Other political affiliations: Pakatan Rakyat (PR) (2008–2015); Gagasan Sejahtera (GS) (2016–2020); Perikatan Nasional (PN) (2020–present)
- Occupation: Politician

Mohd Yusni bin Mat Piah is a Malaysian politician who has served as Member of the Penang State Legislative Assembly (MLA) for Penaga since May 2018. He is a member of the Malaysian Islamic Party (PAS), a component party of the Perikatan Nasional (PN) coalition. He was also previously the sole PAS Penang MLA prior to the 2023 Penang state election.

== Election results ==
Penang State Legislative Assembly
Year	Constituency	Candidate	Votes	Pct	Opponent(s)	Votes	Pct	Ballots cast	Majority	Turnout
2013	N21 Sungai Acheh	Mohd Yusni Mat Piah (PAS)	690	4.97%	Mahmud Zakaria (UMNO)	6,891	49.64%	13,881	808	89.22%
2013	N21 Sungai Acheh	Mohd Yusni Mat Piah (PAS)	690	4.97%	Badrul Hisham Shaharin (PKR)	6,083	43.82%	13,881	808	89.22%
2018	N01 Penaga	Mohd Yusni Mat Piah (PAS)	8,530	50.77%	Mohd Zain Ahmad (UMNO)	7,398	44.03%	16,801	1,132	88.01%
2023	N01 Penaga	Mohd Yusni Mat Piah (PAS)	13,223	63.24%	Mohd Naim Salleh (UMNO)	7,686	36.76%	20,909	5,537	82.10%

== Honours ==
- Malaysia
  - Officer of the Order of the Defender of the Realm (KMN) (2021)
