= Bukhori Ghazali =

Malaysian politician

Yang Berhormat Tuan Bukhori Ghazali MLA
- بخاري غزالي

Member of the Penang State Legislative Assembly for Pinang Tunggal
- Incumbent
- Assumed office 12 August 2023
- Preceded by: Ahmad Zakiyuddin Abdul Rahman (PH–PKR)
- Majority: 6,928 (2023)

Personal details
- Born: Bukhori bin Ghazali Penang, Malaysia
- Citizenship: Malaysian
- Party: Malaysian Islamic Party (PAS)
- Other political affiliations: Perikatan Nasional (PN)
- Occupation: Politician

Bukhori bin Ghazali is a Malaysian politician who has served as Member of the Penang State Legislative Assembly (MLA) for Pinang Tunggal since August 2023. He is a member of the Malaysian Islamic Party (PAS), a component party of the Perikatan Nasional (PN) coalition.

== Election results ==
Penang State Legislative Assembly
Year	Constituency	Candidate	Votes	Pct	Opponent(s)	Votes	Pct	Ballots cast	Majority	Turnout
2018	N03 Pinang Tunggal	Bukhori Ghazali (PAS)	4,622	23.11%	Ahmad Zakiyuddin Abdul Rahman (PKR)	7,754	38.76%	20,396	127	88.46%
2018	N03 Pinang Tunggal	Bukhori Ghazali (PAS)	4,622	23.11%	Roslan Saidin (UMNO)	7,627	38.13%	20,396	127	88.46%
2023	N03 Pinang Tunggal	Bukhori Ghazali (PAS)	17,060	62.74%	Zainuddin Mohamad (PKR)	10,132	37.26%	27,418	6,928	78.96%
