= Yahaya Abdul Hamid =

Malaysian politician

Yang Berbahagia Dato' Seri Yahaya Abdul Hamid DGPN DMPN

7th Speaker of the Penang State Legislative Assembly
- In office 25 April 1995 – 12 February 2008
- Yang di-Pertua Negeri of Penang: Hamdan Sheikh Tahir (1989–2001); Abdul Rahman Abbas (2001–2021)
- Chief Minister: Koh Tsu Koon
- Preceded by: Abdul Rahman Abbas (BN–UMNO)
- Succeeded by: Abdul Halim Hussain (PR–PKR)
- Constituency: Pinang Tunggal (1986–2004); Non-MLA (2004–2008)

Member of the Penang State Legislative Assembly for Pinang Tunggal
- In office 1986–2004
- Preceded by: New constituency
- Succeeded by: Roslan Saidin (BN–UMNO)
- Majority: 1,654 (1986); 1,795 (1990); 6,824 (1995); 4,376 (1999)

Personal details
- Born: Yahaya bin Abdul Hamid; 13 June 1945 (age 80) Penang, Japanese occupation of Malaya
- Party: United Malays National Organisation (UMNO)
- Other political affiliations: Barisan Nasional (BN)

Yahaya bin Abdul Hamid is a Malaysian politician. He has served as the Speaker of the Penang State Legislative Assembly for three terms from 1995 to 2008.

== Political career ==
Yahaya Abdul Hamid made his debut by being elected as Member of State Legislative Assembly for Pinang Tunggal in 1986. After the 1990 general election, Yahaya Abdul Hamid was appointed Member of Penang State Executive Council (EXCO) in the state administration under Chief Minister Koh Tsu Koon. In 1995, he was appointed Speaker of the State Legislative Assembly until 2008.

== Election results ==
Penang State Legislative Assembly
Year	Constituency	Candidate	Votes	Pct	Opponent(s)	Votes	Pct	Ballots cast	Majority	Turnout
1986	N03 Pinang Tunggal	Yahaya Abdul Hamid (UMNO)	3,697	60.63%	Ahmad Hasan Salahuddin (PAS)	2,043	33.51%	6,284	1,654	79.35%
1986	N03 Pinang Tunggal	Yahaya Abdul Hamid (UMNO)	3,697	60.63%	Ahmad Othman (DAP)	358	5.87%	6,284	1,654	79.35%
1990	N03 Pinang Tunggal	Yahaya Abdul Hamid (UMNO)	4,080	64.10%	Mohd Sani Abdullah (S46)	2,285	35.80%	6,643	1,795	82.96%
1995	N03 Pinang Tunggal	Yahaya Abdul Hamid (UMNO)	8,397	84.21%	ASyed Ibrahim Syed Abu Bakar (S46)	1,573	15.79%	10,294	6,824	80.48%
1999	N03 Pinang Tunggal	Yahaya Abdul Hamid (UMNO)	7,224	71.72%	Abdul Ghani Haroon (keADILan)	2,848	28.28%	10,416	4,376	80.78%

== Honours ==
- Penang
  - Commander of the Order of the Defender of State (DGPN) – Dato' Seri (2007)
  - Companion of the Order of the Defender of State (DMPN) – Dato' (1995)
