= Pinang Tunggal =

- Neighbourhood of Seberang Perai
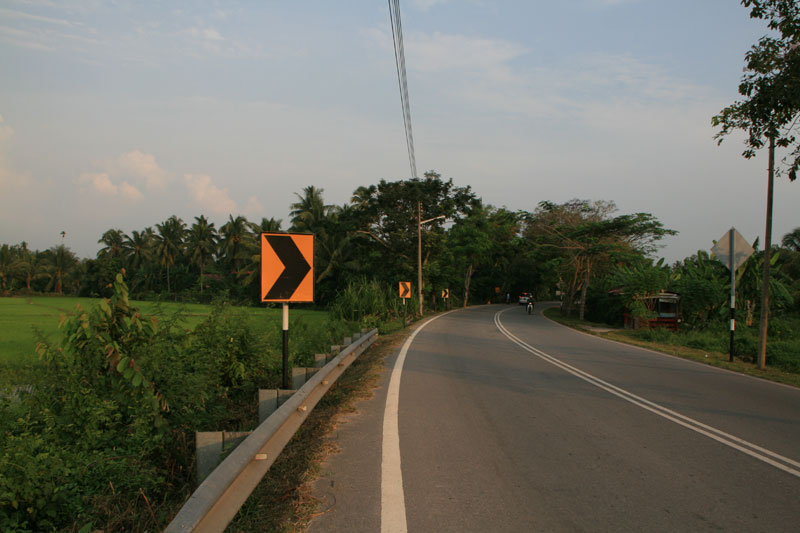
- Road to Pinang Tunggal

- Location within Seberang Perai in Penang
- Coordinates: 5°33′09″N 100°30′14″E
- Country: Malaysia
- State: Penang
- City: Seberang Perai
- District: North Seberang Perai
- Time zone: UTC+8 (Malaysian Standard Time)
  - Summer (DST): Not observed

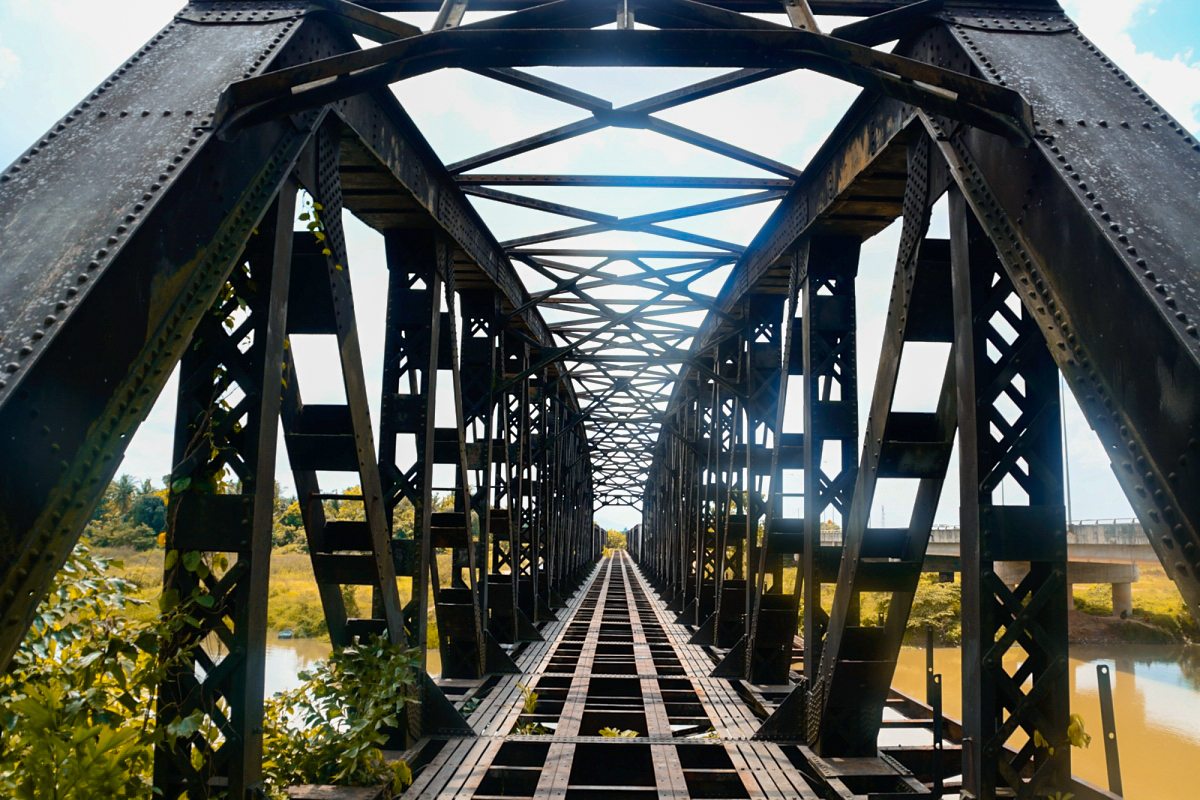
Pinang Tunggal old railway bridge

Pinang Tunggal is a residential neighbourhood within the city of Seberang Perai in the Malaysian state of Penang. It is 10 km (6.2 mi) from Kepala Batas. It has a river Sungai Muda.
