= 2023 Penang state election =

Malaysian state election

- 12 August 2023

All 40 seats in the Penang State Legislative Assembly 21 seats needed for a majority
- Registered: 1,234,198 (▲30.52%)
- Turnout: 72.67% (▼11.95pp)
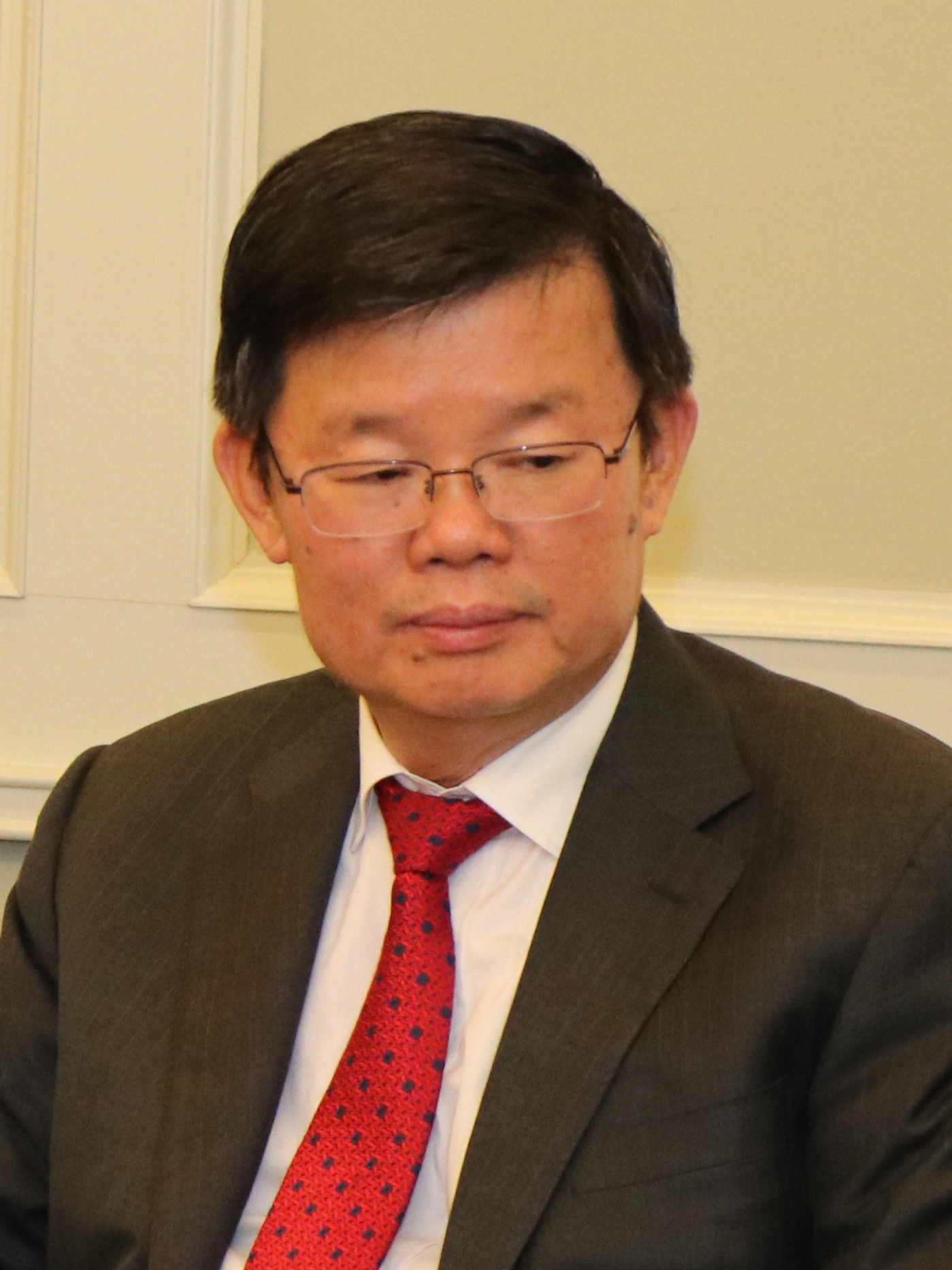

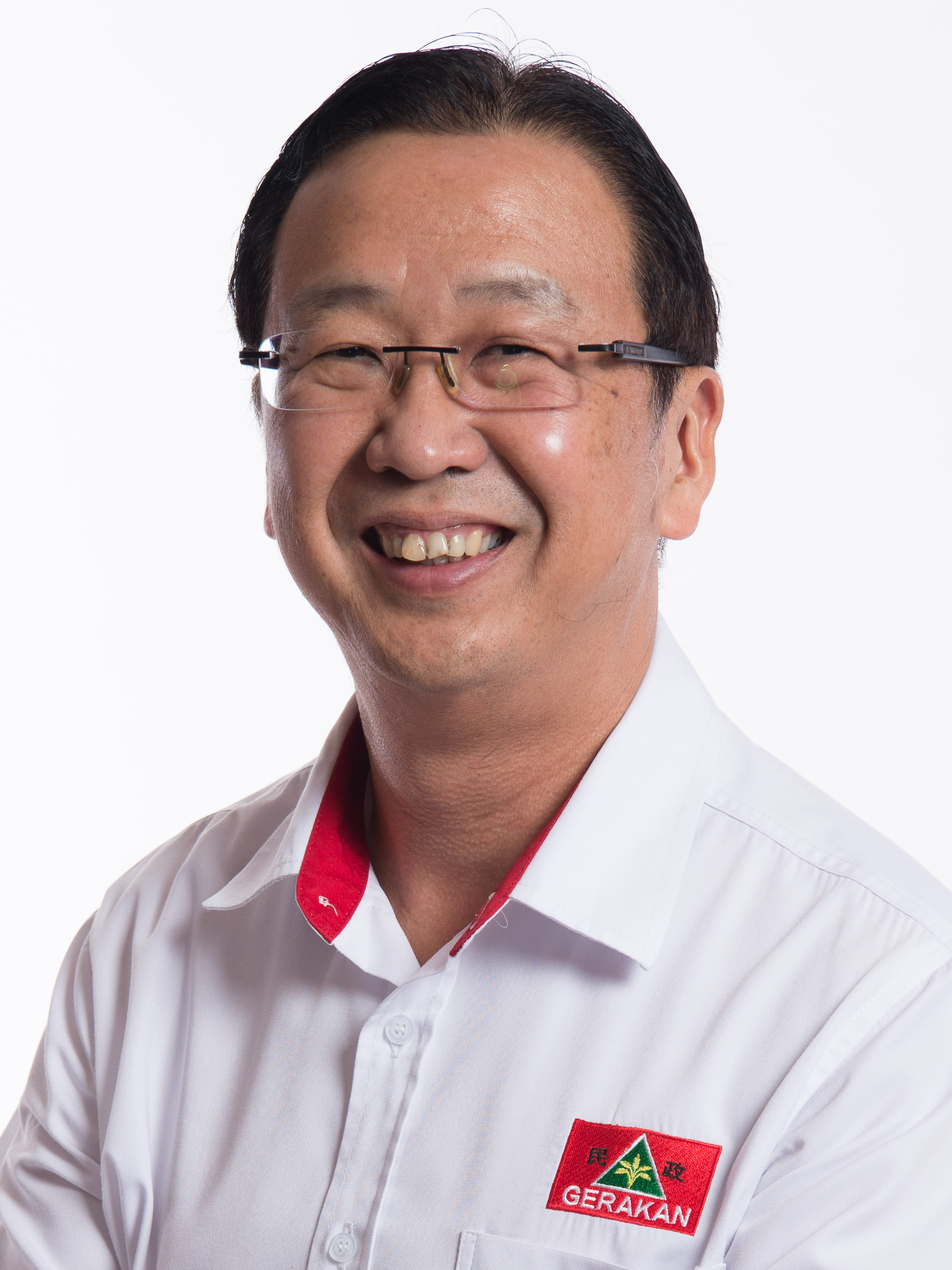
	Majority party	Minority party
Leader	Chow Kon Yeow; Musa Sheikh Fadzir	Dominic Lau Hoe Chai
Party	DAP; UMNO	GERAKAN
Alliance	Pakatan Harapan; Barisan Nasional Parties: DAP; PKR; AMANAH; UMNO	Perikatan Nasional Parties: GERAKAN; BERSATU; PAS
Leader since	21 May 2019; 16 July 2018	12 June 2022
Leader's seat	Chow: Padang Kota; Musa: Did not stand	Stood in Bayan Lepas (defeated)
Last election	37 seats, 82.00% (Note: PH: 35 seats BN: 2 seats)	3 seats, 17.34% (Note: New coalition formed in 2020. These numbers are the total seats and vote share of BERSATU, PAS and GERAKAN in the last election. The parties were previously part of Pakatan Harapan, Gagasan Sejahtera and Barisan Nasional.)
Seats before	35	1
Seats won	29	11
Seat change	▼6	▲10
Popular vote	591,609	290,514
Percentage	66.48%	32.65%
Swing	▼15.52%	▲15.31%
Chief Minister of Penang before election
Chow Kon Yeow
PH
Chief Minister of Penang after election
Chow Kon Yeow
PH-BN coalition

The 15th Penang state election was held on 12 August 2023 to elect the State Assembly members of the 15th Penang State Legislative Assembly, the legislature of the Malaysian state of Penang.

Penang is one of the states which did not dissolve simultaneously with Dewan Rakyat on 10 October 2022. It was decided by Pakatan Harapan on 15 October 2022.

The Barisan Nasional (BN) – Pakatan Harapan (PH) electoral pact won 29 of 40 seats, with PH winning a standalone majority of 27 seats and BN winning 2 seats. The Perikatan Nasional (PN) coalition won the remaining 11 seats to become the main opposition in the state assembly.

== Background ==
Perikatan Nasional and Pakatan Harapan + Barisan Nasional is the main coalition in this state election, photo taken at Jalan Raja Uda, Butterworth

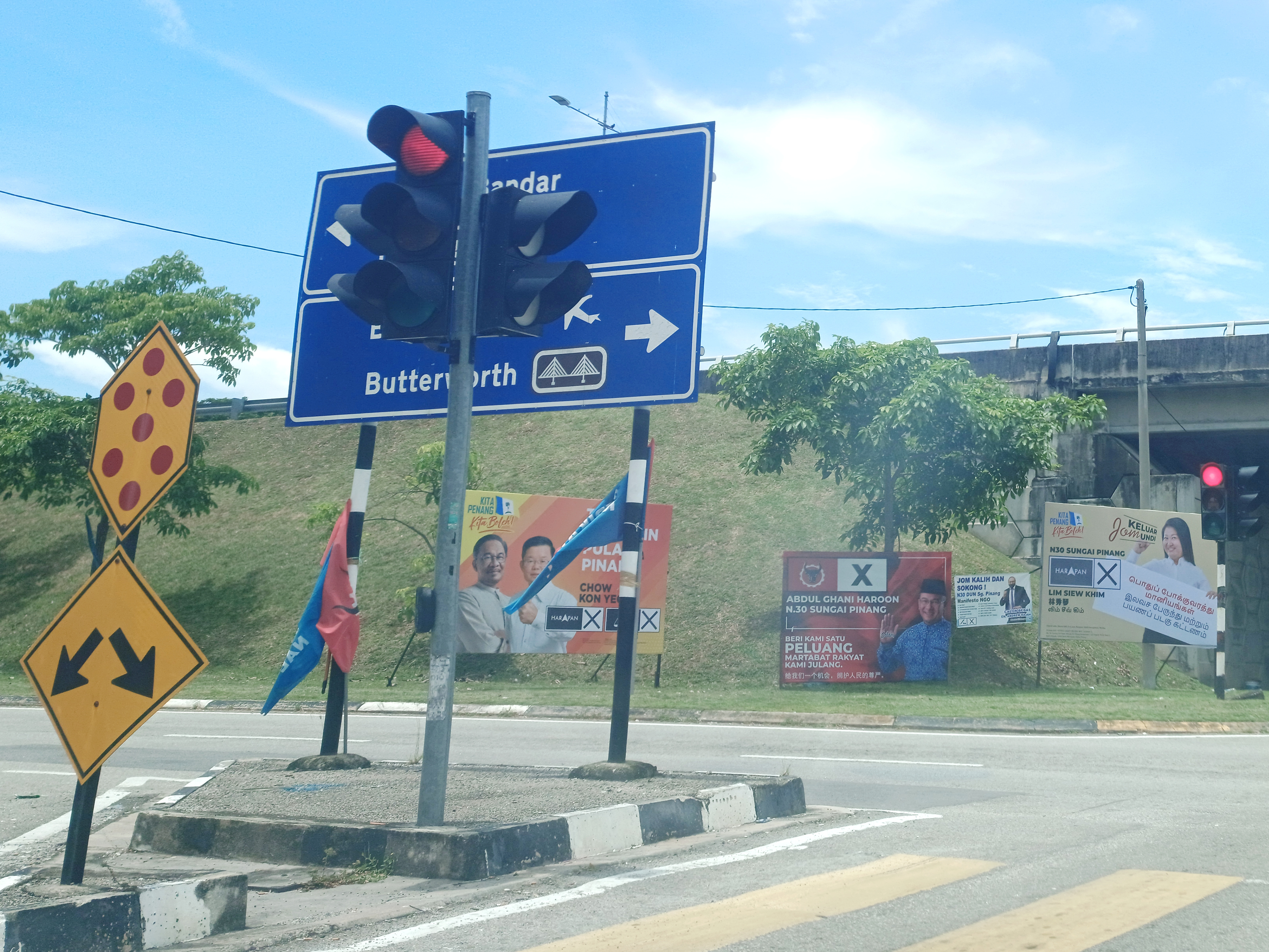
Tun Dr Lim Chong Eu Expressway Sungai Pinang intersection during campaign period

In the 2018 general election, Pakatan Harapan won the state of Penang, winning 37 out of the 40 state seats. Despite the Sheraton Move occurring in the beginning of 2020, the various changes during the 2020 - 2022 Malaysian political crisis did not affect the politics at the state level, allowing the Pakatan Harapan state government to continue to govern.

On 6 August 2020, the Chief Minister of Penang, Chow Kon Yeow, reiterated his stance that all states that have a Pakatan Harapan government, including Penang, would not dissolve the state assemblies in order to coincide with a snap general election. This was because at the time, the Penang, Selangor and Negeri Sembilan state governments had a stable majority. The Pakatan Harapan leadership further emphasised that there would not be a dissolution of assembly in 2021 and 2022, citing various factors, such as the ongoing COVID-19 pandemic, the need for the state governments to complete a full term, and the possibility of various factors which might inconvenience people should the state elections be called at the wrong time, such as floods, ahead of the 2022 Malaysian general election.

On 10 October 2022, Malaysian Prime Minister Ismail Sabri Yaakob dissolved Parliament, resulting in a snap general election being held in Malaysia on 19 November 2022. Traditionally, every state in Malaysia except Sarawak would hold their state elections concurrently with the general election for the sake of convenience, but since 2020, several Malaysian states held state elections separately from the general election, with Sabah on 26 September 2020, Malacca on 20 November 2021, Sarawak on 18 December 2021 and Johor on 12 March 2022. With the exception of Perlis, Perak and Pahang holding state elections during the 2022 Malaysian general election, all other states, including Penang, will hold their state elections in 2023.

== Constituencies ==
All 40 constituencies within Penang, which constitute the Penang State Legislative Assembly, were contested during the election.

Electoral map of Penang. showing all 40 constituencies

Breakdown of 2022 Malaysian general election result by state constituency in 2022, where PH in Red, PN in Blue-green and BN in blue

== Composition before dissolution ==
Government			Confidence and supply	Opposition
PH			BN	PN
33			2	1
19	12	2	2	1
DAP	PKR	AMANAH	UMNO	PAS

== Timeline ==
The key dates are listed below.

Date	Event
15 October 2022	Pakatan Harapan Presidential Council decided against dissolving the 14th Penang State Legislative Assembly.
28 June 2023	Dissolution of the Penang State Legislative Assembly.
5 July 2023	Issue of the Writ of Election
29 July 2023	Nomination Day
29 July–11 August 2023	Campaigning Period
8–11 August 2023	Early Polling Day For Postal, Overseas and Advance Voters
12 August 2023	Polling Day

== Retiring incumbent ==
The following members of the 14th State Legislative Assembly do not contest this election.

No.	State Constituency	Departing MLA	Coalition (Party)	Date confirmed	First elected	Reason
N06	Telok Ayer Tawar	Mustafa Kamal Ahmad	PH (PKR)	18 July 2023	2018	Not seeking re-election.
N36	Pantai Jerejak	Saifuddin Nasution Ismail	PH (PKR)	18 July 2023	2018	Not contesting state election. (Senator)
N3	Pinang Tunggal	Ahmad Zakiyuddin Abdul Rahman	PH (PKR)	22 July 2023	2018	Dropped by party.
N12	Penanti	Norlela Ariffin	PH (PKR)	22 July 2023	2013	Dropped by party.
N20	Sungai Bakap	Amar Pritpal Abdullah	PH (PKR)	22 July 2023	2018	Dropped by party.
N24	Kebun Bunga	Jason Ong Khan Lee	PH (PKR)	22 July 2023	2008	Dropped by party.
N37	Batu Maung	Abdul Halim Hussain	PH (PKR)	22 July 2023	2018	Dropped by party.
N7	Sungai Puyu	Phee Boon Poh	PH (DAP)	25 July 2023	1990	Dropped by party.
N8	Bagan Jermal	Soon Lip Chee	PH (DAP)	25 July 2023	2013	Dropped by party.
N15	Padang Lalang	Chong Eng	PH (DAP)	25 July 2023	1995	Dropped by party.
N16	Perai	Ramasamy Palanisamy	PH (DAP)	25 July 2023	2008	Dropped by party.
N34	Paya Terubong	Yeoh Soon Hin	PH (DAP)	25 July 2023	2008	Dropped by party.
N32	Seri Delima	Syerleena Abdul Rashid	PH (DAP)	25 July 2023	2018	Not contesting state election (MP for Bukit Bendera).
N25	Pulau Tikus	Chris Lee Chun Kit	PH (DAP)	25 July 2023	2018	Not contesting state election.
N5	Sungai Dua	Muhamad Yusoff Mohd Noor	BN (UMNO)	21 July 2023	2013	Dropped by party.
N10	Seberang Jaya	Afif Bahardin	PN (BERSATU)	6 March 2023	2013	Transferred to Taman Medan (Selangor).
N40	Telok Bahang	Zolkifly Mohd Lazim	PN (BERSATU)	6 March 2023	2018	Dropped by party.

== Electoral candidates ==
Names in bold are the confirmed winners in the 2023 state election.

No.	Parliamentary Constituency	No.	State Constituency	Voters	Incumbent State Assemblymen	Coalition (Party)	Political coalitions and parties									
No.	Parliamentary Constituency	No.	State Constituency	Voters	Incumbent State Assemblymen	Coalition (Party)	Barisan Nasional + Pakatan Harapan		Perikatan Nasional		MUDA + PSM electoral pact		Other parties/Independents			
No.	Parliamentary Constituency	No.	State Constituency	Voters	Incumbent State Assemblymen	Coalition (Party)	Candidate name	Party	Candidate name	Party	Candidate name	Party	Candidate name	Party	Candidate name	Party
P041	Kepala Batas	N01	Penaga	25,468	Mohd Yusni Mat Piah	**PN** (**PAS**)	Mohd Naim Salleh	UMNO	**Mohd Yusni Mat Piah**	PAS						
P041	Kepala Batas	N02	Bertam	23,999	Vacant (Note: The seat was won by Khaliq Mehtab Mohd Ishaq in the 2018 Penang state election as a candidate of Pakatan Harapan (BERSATU). BERSATU exited PH in March 2020, and created a new coalition Perikatan Nasional (PN). Khaliq was vacated from his seat in an approved motion in the Penang state assembly on 6 March 2023.)		**Reezal Merican Naina Merican**	UMNO	Khaliq Mehtab Mohd Ishaq	BERSATU						
P041	Kepala Batas	N03	Pinang Tunggal	34,723	Ahmad Zakiyuddin Abdul Rahman	**PH** (**PKR**)	Zainuddin Mohamad	PKR	**Bukhori Ghazali**	PAS						
P042	Tasek Gelugor	N04	Permatang Berangan	28,519	Nor Hafizah Othman	**BN** (**UMNO**)	Nor Hafizah Othman	UMNO	**Mohamad Sobri Saleh**	PAS						
P042	Tasek Gelugor	N05	Sungai Dua	28,100	Muhamad Yusoff Mohd Noor	**BN** (**UMNO**)	Shaik Hussein Mydin	UMNO	**Muhammad Fauzi Yusoff**	PAS						
P042	Tasek Gelugor	N06	Telok Ayer Tawar	24,784	Mustafa Kamal Ahmad	**PH** (**PKR**)	Mohsein Md Shariff	PKR	**Azmi Alang**	BERSATU						
P043	Bagan	N07	Sungai Puyu	35,904	Phee Boon Poh	**PH** (**DAP**)	**Phee Syn Tze**	DAP	Andrew Teow Chin Siang	PAS						
P043	Bagan	N08	Bagan Jermal	32,529	Soon Lip Chee	**PH** (**DAP**)	**Chee Yeeh Keen**	DAP	Ong Chuan Jin	BERSATU						
P043	Bagan	N09	Bagan Dalam	21,221	Satees Muniandy	**PH** (**DAP**)	**Kumaran Krishnan**	DAP	Jayaraman Kunchu Kannu	PAS			S. Rajasakanan	PFP	Satees Muniandy	**IND**
P044	Permatang Pauh	N10	Seberang Jaya	49,215	Vacant (Note: The seat was won by Afif Bahardin in the 2018 Penang state election as a candidate of Pakatan Harapan (PKR). He later exited PH and PKR in March 2020, and joined BERSATU and Perikatan Nasional (PN). Afif was vacated from his seat in an approved motion in the Penang state assembly on 6 March 2023.)		Johari Kassim	PKR	**Izhar Shah Arif Shah**	BERSATU						
P044	Permatang Pauh	N11	Permatang Pasir	30,464	Muhammad Faiz Fadzil	**PH** (**AMANAH**)	Muhammad Faiz Fadzil	AMANAH	**Amir Hamzah Abdul Hashim**	PAS						
P044	Permatang Pauh	N12	Penanti	28,170	Norlela Ariffin	**PH** (**PKR**)	Rohsidi Hussain	PKR	**Zulkifli Bakar**	BERSATU						
P045	Bukit Mertajam	N13	Berapit	29,076	Heng Lee Lee	**PH** (**DAP**)	**Heng Lee Lee**	DAP	Lee Kok Keong	GERAKAN						
P045	Bukit Mertajam	N14	Machang Bubok	56,538	Lee Khai Loon	**PH** (**PKR**)	**Lee Khai Loon**	PKR	Tan Hum Wei	GERAKAN						
P045	Bukit Mertajam	N15	Padang Lalang	36,001	Chong Eng	**PH** (**DAP**)	**Gooi Zi Sen**	DAP	Suresh Devaraj Naidu	BERSATU			Ooi Khar Giap	PFP		
P046	Batu Kawan	N16	Perai	20,479	Ramasamy Palanisamy	**PH** (**DAP**)	**Sundarajoo Somu**	DAP	Sivasuntaram Rajalinggam	GERAKAN	Vikneswary Harikrishnan	**MUDA**	David Marshel	IND		
P046	Batu Kawan	N17	Bukit Tengah	31,635	Gooi Hsiao Leung	**PH** (**PKR**)	**Gooi Hsiao Leung**	PKR	Baljit Singh Jigiri Singh	GERAKAN						
P046	Batu Kawan	N18	Bukit Tambun	37,496	Goh Choon Aik	**PH** (**PKR**)	**Goh Choon Aik**	PKR	Tan Gia Wei	GERAKAN			Somuganathan Muniandy	IND		
P047	Nibong Tebal	N19	Jawi	36,601	H’ng Mooi Lye	**PH** (**DAP**)	**H’ng Mooi Lye**	DAP	Steven Koh Tien Yew	PAS						
P047	Nibong Tebal	N20	Sungai Bakap	38,409	Amar Pritpal Abdullah	**PH** (**PKR**)	Nurhidayah Che Rus	PKR	**Nor Zamri Latiff**	PAS						
P047	Nibong Tebal	N21	Sungai Acheh	26,095	Vacant (Note: The seat was won by Zulkifli Ibrahim in the 2018 Penang state election as a candidate of Pakatan Harapan (PKR). He later exited PH and PKR in March 2020, and joined BERSATU and Perikatan Nasional (PN). Zulkifli was vacated from his seat in an approved motion in the Penang state assembly on 6 March 2023.)		**Rashidi Zinol**	UMNO	Zulkifli Ibrahim	BERSATU						
P048	Bukit Bendera	N22	Tanjong Bunga	29,477	Zairil Khir Johari	**PH** (**DAP**)	**Zairil Khir Johari**	DAP	Hng Chee Wey	GERAKAN			Lee Chui Wah	PRM		
P048	Bukit Bendera	N23	Air Putih	15,371	Lim Guan Eng	**PH** (**DAP**)	**Lim Guan Eng**	DAP	Koh Cheng Ann	GERAKAN			Teh Yee Cheu	PRM		
P048	Bukit Bendera	N24	Kebun Bunga	24,532	Jason Ong Khan Lee	**PH** (**PKR**)	**Lee Boon Heng**	PKR	Tan Zhen Zune	GERAKAN			Razalif Mohamad Zain	IND		
P048	Bukit Bendera	N25	Pulau Tikus	23,257	Chris Lee Chun Kit	**PH** (**DAP**)	**Woo Sze Zeng**	DAP	Tang Ching Sern	GERAKAN			Goh Chuin Loon	PRM		
P049	Tanjong	N26	Padang Kota	15,165	Chow Kon Yeow	**PH** (**DAP**)	**Chow Kon Yeow**	DAP	H'ng Khoon Leng	GERAKAN						
P049	Tanjong	N27	Pengkalan Kota	21,568	Gooi Zi Sen	**PH** (**DAP**)	**Wong Yuee Harng**	DAP	Suthakaran Subramaniam	GERAKAN						
P049	Tanjong	N28	Komtar	15,532	Teh Lai Heng	**PH** (**DAP**)	**Teh Lai Heng**	DAP	Cheah Kim Huat	BERSATU						
P050	Jelutong	N29	Datok Keramat	26,791	Jagdeep Singh Deo	**PH** (**DAP**)	**Jagdeep Singh Deo**	DAP	Heng See Lin	GERAKAN						
P050	Jelutong	N30	Sungai Pinang	34,416	Lim Siew Khim	**PH** (**DAP**)	**Lim Siew Khim**	DAP	Ng Fook On	GERAKAN			Abdul Ghani Haroon	PRM	Andrew Rajah	**IND**
P050	Jelutong	N31	Batu Lancang	33,106	Ong Ah Teong	**PH** (**DAP**)	**Ong Ah Teong**	DAP	Mohd Aswaad Jaafar	GERAKAN						
P051	Bukit Gelugor	N32	Seri Delima	31,574	Syerleena Abdul Rashid	**PH** (**DAP**)	**Tan Hooi Peng**	DAP	Mohan Apparoo	BERSATU						
P051	Bukit Gelugor	N33	Air Itam	23,085	Joseph Ng Soon Seong	**PH** (**DAP**)	**Joseph Ng Soon Seong**	DAP	Cheang Chee Gooi	GERAKAN						
P051	Bukit Gelugor	N34	Paya Terubong	62,734	Yeoh Soon Hin	**PH** (**DAP**)	**Wong Hon Wai**	DAP	Ooi Ghee Oon	GERAKAN						
P052	Bayan Baru	N35	Batu Uban	43,529	Kumaresan Aramugam	**PH** (**PKR**)	**Kumaresan Aramugam**	PKR	Mok Kok On	GERAKAN	Lee Kim Noor	**MUDA**				
P052	Bayan Baru	N36	Pantai Jerejak	29,890	Saifuddin Nasution Ismail	**PH** (**PKR**)	**Fahmi Zainol**	PKR	Oh Tong Keong	GERAKAN	Priyankaa Loh Siang Pin	**MUDA**	Ravinder Singh	PRM		
P052	Bayan Baru	N37	Batu Maung	47,226	Abdul Halim Hussain	**PH** (**PKR**)	**Mohamad Abdul Hamid**	PKR	Azahari Aris	BERSATU						
P053	Balik Pulau	N38	Bayan Lepas	39,754	Azrul Mahathir Aziz	**PH** (**AMANAH**)	**Azrul Mahathir Aziz**	AMANAH	Dominic Lau Hoe Chai	GERAKAN						
P053	Balik Pulau	N39	Pulau Betong	23,838	Mohd Tuah Ismail	**PH** (**PKR**)	Mohd Tuah Ismail	PKR	**Mohamad Shukor Zakariah**	PAS						
P053	Balik Pulau	N40	Telok Bahang	17,927	Vacant (Note: The seat was won by Zolkifly Mohd Lazim in the 2018 Penang state election as a candidate of Pakatan Harapan (BERSATU). BERSATU exited PH in March 2020, and created a new coalition Perikatan Nasional (PN). Zolkifly was vacated from his seat in an approved motion in the Penang state assembly on 6 March 2023.)		Ahmad Zaki Shah Shah Headan	UMNO	**Muhamad Kasim**	BERSATU						

== Opinion polls ==
Polling firm	Dates conducted	Sample size	PH+BN	PN	Oth	Lead	Ref
Ilham Centre	29 July – 8 August 2023	2,304	64%	36%	0%	PH+BN +28%	

== Results ==
Results of the August 2023 Penang state election, by party.

Party or alliance		Votes	%	Seats	+/–
Pakatan Harapan + Barisan Nasional	Democratic Action Party	313,731	35.26	19	0
Pakatan Harapan + Barisan Nasional	People's Justice Party	202,522	22.76	7	–7
Pakatan Harapan + Barisan Nasional	United Malays National Organisation	49,476	5.56	2	0
Pakatan Harapan + Barisan Nasional	National Trust Party	25,880	2.91	1	–1
Pakatan Harapan + Barisan Nasional	Total	591,609	66.48	29	–8
Perikatan Nasional	Malaysian Islamic Party	109,508	12.31	7	+6
Perikatan Nasional	Malaysian United Indigenous Party	96,003	10.79	4	+2
Perikatan Nasional	Parti Gerakan Rakyat Malaysia	85,003	9.55	0	0
Perikatan Nasional	Total	290,514	32.65	11	+8
Parti Rakyat Malaysia		1,874	0.21	0	New
MUDA + PSM	Malaysian United Democratic Alliance	1,528	0.17	0	New
Penang Front Party		333	0.04	0	0
Independents		3,996	0.45	0	0
Total		889,854	100.00	40	–

=== By parliamentary constituency ===
PH+BN won 9 of 13 parliamentary constituency by average percentages.

No.	Constituency	Pakatan Harapan + Barisan Nasional	Perikatan Nasional	Member of Parliament
P041	Kepala Batas	42.39%	57.61%	Siti Mastura Mohamad
P042	Tasek Gelugor	37.17%	62.83%	Wan Saiful Wan Jan
P043	Bagan	85.71%	14.29%	Lim Guan Eng
P044	Permatang Pauh	42.81%	57.19%	Muhammad Fawwaz Mohamad Jan
P045	Bukit Mertajam	80.66%	19.34%	Steven Sim Chee Keong
P046	Batu Kawan	78.04%	21.95%	Chow Kon Yeow
P047	Nibong Tebal	61.45%	38.55%	Fadhlina Sidek
P048	Bukit Bendera	84.93%	15.07%	Syerleena Abdul Rashid
P049	Tanjong	90.46%	9.54%	Lim Hui Ying
P050	Jelutong	71.75%	22.25%	RSN Rayer
P051	Bukit Gelugor	86.34%	13.66%	Ramkarpal Singh
P052	Bayan Baru	67.16%	32.84%	Sim Tze Tzin
P053	Balik Pulau	49.91%	50.09%	Muhammad Bakhtiar Wan Chik

=== Seats that changed allegiance ===
No.	Seat	Previous Party (2018)	Current Party (2022)
N02	Bertam	Pakatan Harapan (BERSATU)	Barisan Nasional (UMNO)
N03	Pinang Tunggal	Pakatan Harapan (PKR)	Perikatan Nasional (PAS)
N04	Permatang Berangan	Barisan Nasional (UMNO)	Perikatan Nasional (PAS)
N05	Sungai Dua	Barisan Nasional (UMNO)	Perikatan Nasional (PAS)
N06	Telok Ayer Tawar	Pakatan Harapan (PKR)	Perikatan Nasional (BERSATU)
N10	Seberang Jaya	Pakatan Harapan (PKR)	Perikatan Nasional (BERSATU)
N11	Permatang Pasir	Pakatan Harapan (AMANAH)	Perikatan Nasional (PAS)
N12	Penanti	Pakatan Harapan (PKR)	Perikatan Nasional (BERSATU)
N20	Sungai Bakap	Pakatan Harapan (PKR)	Perikatan Nasional (PAS)
N21	Sungai Acheh	Pakatan Harapan (PKR)	Barisan Nasional (UMNO)
N39	Pulau Betong	Pakatan Harapan (PKR)	Perikatan Nasional (PAS)
N40	Telok Bahang	Pakatan Harapan (BERSATU)	Perikatan Nasional (BERSATU)
