= Permatang Rambai =

- Village in Seberang Perai
- .Location within Seberang Perai in Penang
- Coordinates: 5°31′29.38″N 100°23′45.7″E
- Country: Malaysia
- State: Penang
- City: Seberang Perai
- District: Central Seberang Perai
- Time zone: UTC+8 (MST)
  - Summer (DST): Not observed
- Postal code: 13200

Permatang Rambai is a village within the city of Seberang Perai in the Malaysian state of Penang.
