= 2013 Penang state election =

State election in Malaysia

- 5 May 2013

40 seats to the Penang State Legislative Assembly 21 seats needed for a majority
- Registered: 846,232
- Turnout: 738,077 (87.22%, ▲9.15%)
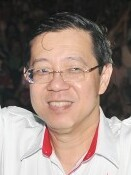

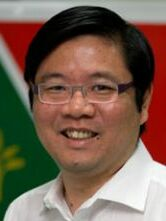
	Majority party	Minority party
Leader	Lim Guan Eng	Teng Chang Yeow
Party	DAP	GERAKAN
Alliance	PR	BN
Leader since	4 September 2004	22 April 2012
Leader's seat	Air Putih	Ran in Bukit Tengah (lost)
Last election	29 seats, 58.89%	11 seats, 40.97%
Seats before	29	11
Seats won	30	10
Seat change	▲1	▼1
Popular vote	490,739	233,305
Percentage	67.45%	32.06%
Swing	▲8.56%	▼8.91%
- Pakatan Rakyat seats: DAP PKR PAS Opposition seats: UMNO
Chief Minister before election
Lim Guan Eng
Pakatan Rakyat (DAP)
Elected Chief Minister
Lim Guan Eng
Pakatan Rakyat (DAP)

The 13th Penang election was held on 5 May 2013. Polling took place in 40 constituencies throughout the State of Penang, with each electing a State Assemblyman to the Penang State Legislative Assembly. The election was conducted by the Malaysian Election Commission.

The legislative body had been dissolved on 5 April by the Governor of Penang, Abdul Rahman Abbas, on the advice of the incumbent Chief Minister, Lim Guan Eng, who also led the state's ruling coalition, Pakatan Rakyat (PR). Electoral candidates were nominated on 20 April.

The PR not only successfully defended its two-thirds majority in the Penang State Legislative Assembly, it also captured an additional constituency from the state opposition, Barisan Nasional (BN), bringing PR's tally to 30 seats. This was despite BN's massive campaign in Penang, which included sponsored performances by Psy, Busta Rhymes and Ludacris in George Town. It was later revealed that BN's large-scale attempt at recapturing Penang, which it lost in the previous election, received substantial financial funding from Jho Low, a Penang-born tycoon notorious for his involvement in the 1Malaysia Development Berhad (1MDB) scandal.

== Background ==
The election was the 13th state election in the State of Penang since the independence of Malaya (now Malaysia) in 1957. The governing Pakatan Rakyat (PR) had won the previous election in 2008 and sought to secure their second consecutive term in office.

According to the Constitution of the State of Penang, the Penang State Legislative Assembly, the legislature of Penang, has a maximum term of five years, starting from the date of the first sitting of Assembly following a state election. However, the Chief Minister, as Penang's head of government, may advise the Governor, the head of state, to dissolve the Assembly before the five-year period is up. On 5 April 2013, the Governor of Penang, Abdul Rahman Abbas, gave his consent to the incumbent Chief Minister of Penang, Lim Guan Eng, to dissolve the Assembly.

A state election must be held within sixty days after the dissolution. The Malaysian Election Commission set 20 April as the nomination day and 5 May as the polling day, providing for a campaigning period of 15 days.

=== Political parties ===
The Pakatan Rakyat (PR), the ruling coalition in Penang, was led by the incumbent Chief Minister, Lim Guan Eng. In the aftermath of the 2008 state election, the PR controlled 29 out of the 40 seats in the Penang State Legislative Assembly.

The PR was opposed by the Barisan Nasional (BN), which was led by Teng Chang Yeow of Parti Gerakan Rakyat Malaysia (Gerakan).

Coalition		Other parties
Incumbent	Opposition	Other parties
Pakatan Rakyat	Barisan Nasional	Love Malaysia Party (PCM); Homeland Human's Wellbeing Party (KITA)
Democratic Action Party (DAP); People's Justice Party (PKR); Malaysian Islamic Party (PAS)	United Malays National Organisation (UMNO); Parti Gerakan Rakyat Malaysia (Gerakan); Malaysian Chinese Association (MCA); Malaysian Indian Congress (MIC)	Love Malaysia Party (PCM); Homeland Human's Wellbeing Party (KITA)

=== Electoral constituencies ===
All 40 state constituencies within Penang, which form the Penang State Legislative Assembly, were contested during the election.

The state constituencies of Penang (in blue) as of 2008.
DAP-controlled seats
PKR-controlled seats
BN-controlled seats
PAS-controlled seats

== Campaign ==
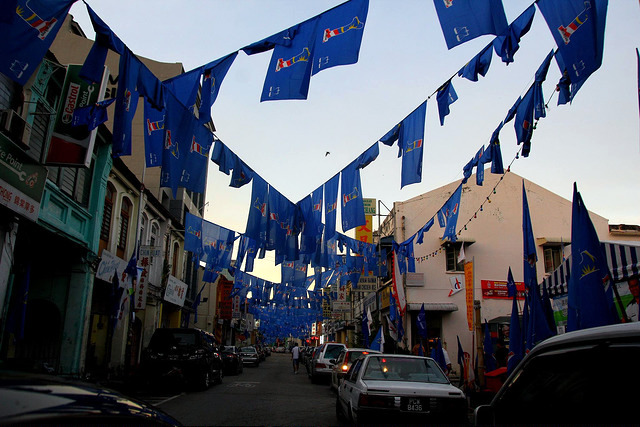
Barisan Nasional (BN) flags placed indiscriminately along a street in George Town. This haphazard act, which marred much of the cityscape, incensed Penangites and was speculated to have contributed to BN's defeat in the election.

The PR-led Penang state government campaigned by emphasising the administration's achievements during its five-year tenure, including social welfare policies targeted at the needy and its success at cutting the state's public debts by 95%. The latter, along with a sharp increase in foreign direct investments into Penang since 2008, had been acclaimed by Bloomberg, an American news outlet, as "Malaysia's biggest economic success"; the article added that "Penang’s economic resurgence may bolster Pakatan Rakyat’s claim that it can be an alternative to the Barisan Nasional (BN), which has run the country since independence from British rule in 1957".

The BN, on the other hand, relied conspicuously on financial backing from Jho Low, a Penang-born businessman who was involved with the 1Malaysia Development Berhad (1MDB), a national investment fund established by the Malaysian Prime Minister, Najib Razak. Lavish funds were spent on campaigning materiel and events, including free-of-charge public dinners, lucky draws and concerts featuring famous international artistes. Prime Minister Najib also made magnanimous pledges to Penangites in the course of the campaign, such as the construction of 9,999 affordable housing units at Air Itam by 1MDB and a monorail system within Penang.

The BN's campaign excesses became more apparent towards the polling day, with tens of thousands of 1Malaysia and BN flags placed haphazardly across the streets of George Town; in many instances, the blue flags marred the city's landscape. Once again, Jho Low was allegedly behind the production of such an unprecedented amount of flags. The chief of BN in Penang, Teng Chang Yeow, even reportedly plead to Jho Low's men to put up the flags properly, while denying that the BN was responsible for the voluminous amount of BN-linked flags throughout the city.

=== Rallies and concerts ===
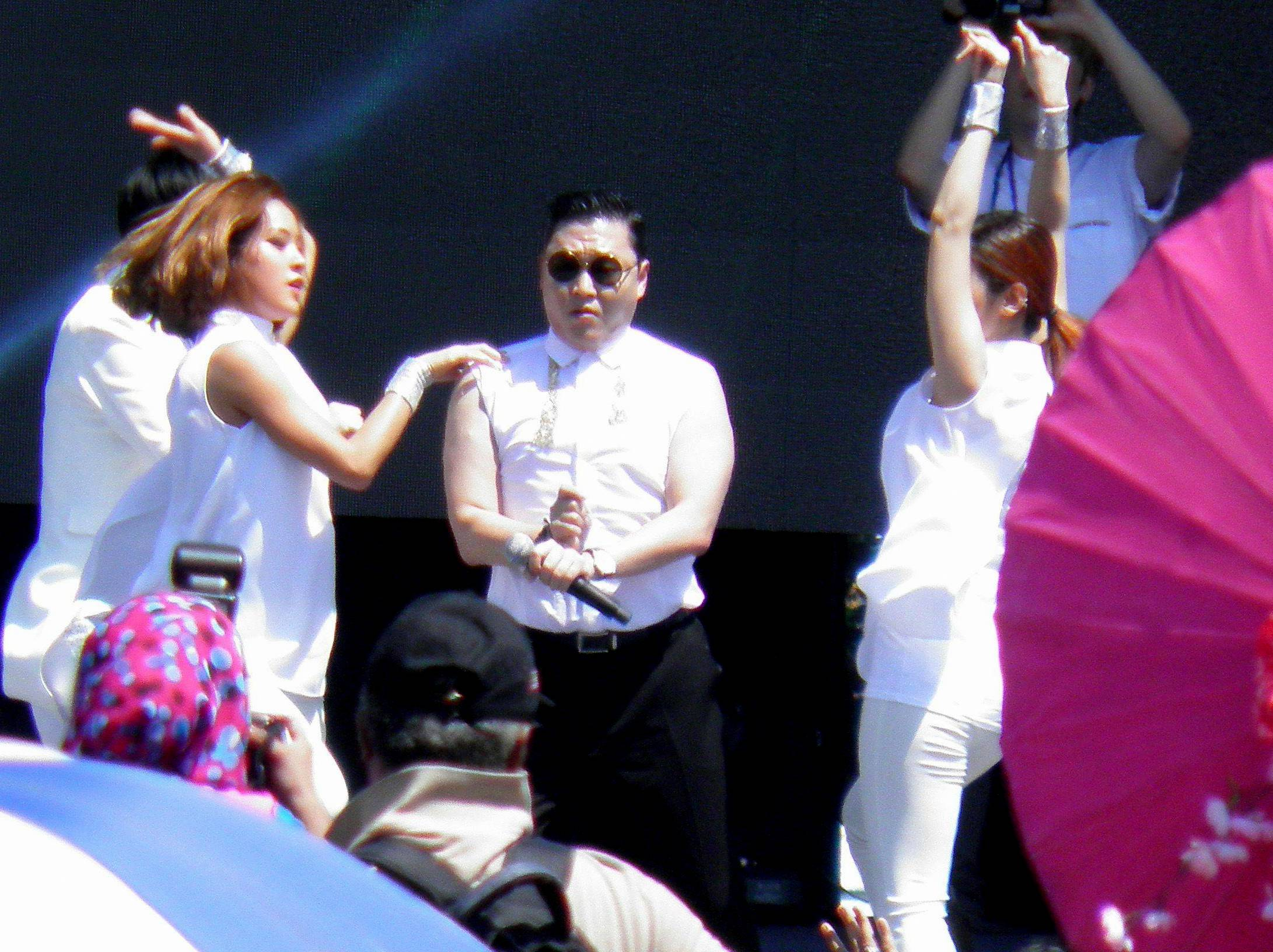
Psy performing Gangnam Style during a Barisan Nasional (BN) rally at Han Chiang College in George Town on 11 February 2013.

Both the Pakatan Rakyat (PR) and Barisan Nasional (BN) coalitions held rallies, known in Malay as ceramah, throughout Penang during the campaigning period just prior to the polling day. Pakatan Rakyat (PR) rallies, in particular, attracted record-breaking turnouts and generated a sizeable sum of donations. For instance, a PR rally at the Han Chiang College in George Town on 29 April 2013 drew a crowd of 50,000; the key speakers during the rally included Lim Guan Eng, Lim Kit Siang, Karpal Singh and Anwar Ibrahim. A few days later, an even larger PR rally, which was attended by more than 100,000 people, was held at George Town's Esplanade.

Meanwhile, the BN, learning from its defeat in the previous election, organised a series of sponsored concerts, which were financially funded by Jho Low. The most famous of all was Psy's concert at the Han Chiang College on 11 February, days after the Chinese New Year. Just before Psy appeared on-stage, it was the Malaysian Prime Minister, Najib Razak's turn to give a speech. Najib proceeded by repeatedly asking the crowd "Are you ready for Psy?" and the spectators responded "Yes". However, he next asked "Are you ready for BN?", which was met by a resounding "No!" from the crowd. The spectators also dispersed immediately after Psy finished performing his signature Gangnam Style. Another concert was held at the same venue on 20 April, featuring international artistes such as Busta Rhymes, Ludacris, Gigi Leung, Alan Tam and Hacken Lee.

== Incidents ==
On 23 April 2013, an improvised explosive device (IED) exploded at a Barisan Nasional (BN) rally in Sungai Jawi. The explosion caused no casualty, apart from a BN employee who was slightly injured. A second bomb, found later at the scene, was safely detonated by the police.

On 24 April, BN-linked mat rempits (motorcycle hooligans) interrupted a Pakatan Rakyat (PR) rally at Gelugor. A journalist was assaulted by the mat rempits for attempting to take photographs of the incident.

During the polling day on 5 May, a gang of BN extremists gathered at a polling centre at Air Itam and provoked PR supporters, leading to a fistfight between both groups. More onlookers joined the fight and attacked the BN extremists, causing the BN gang to flee the scene.

== Results ==
Seats won
1. Pakatan Rakyat (75.0%)
2. Barisan Nasional (25.0%)
Popular vote
1. Pakatan Rakyat (67.5%)
2. Barisan Nasional (32.1%)
3. Love Malaysia Party (0.03%)
4. Homeland Human's Wellbeing Party (0.02%)
5. Independent (0.32%)

Party or alliance		Votes	%	Seats	+/–
Pakatan Rakyat	Democratic Action Party	273,935	37.65	19	0
Pakatan Rakyat	People's Justice Party	172,711	23.74	10	+1
Pakatan Rakyat	Pan-Malaysian Islamic Party	44,693	6.14	1	0
Pakatan Rakyat	Total	490,739	67.45	30	+1
Barisan Nasional	United Malays National Organisation	123,251	16.94	10	–1
Barisan Nasional	Parti Gerakan Rakyat Malaysia	66,520	9.14	0	0
Barisan Nasional	Malaysian Chinese Association	35,852	4.93	0	0
Barisan Nasional	Malaysian Indian Congress	7,682	1.06	0	0
Barisan Nasional	Total	233,305	32.06	10	–1
Love Malaysia Party		216	0.03	0	0
People's Welfare Party		159	0.02	0	0
Independents		2,584	0.36	0	0
Total		727,603	100.00	40	0
Valid votes		727,603	98.58		
Invalid/blank votes		10,474	1.42		
Total votes		738,077	100.00		
Registered voters/turnout		846,232	87.22		
Source: ElectionData.MY

An animated electoral map of Penang, depicting the state constituencies gained by the Pakatan Rakyat (PR) in the 2013 Election. DAP-controlled seats PKR-controlled seats BN-controlled seats PAS-controlled seats

The Pakatan Rakyat (PR) emerged from the election in a much stronger position, as it gained one additional constituency - Seberang Jaya - which was won by the People's Justice Party (PKR) candidate, Afif Bahardin; this increased the PR's tally in the Penang State Legislative Assembly to 30 seats. The PR also captured over 2/3 of the popular vote in Penang.

This was achieved in spite of Barisan Nasional's massive and lavish campaign to retake Penang. It was speculated that the loss of Seberang Jaya, which had been held by BN's dominant party, the United Malays National Organisation (UMNO), was due to UMNO's choice of candidate. The BN's popular vote also slipped from 40.96% in the 2008 election to 32.09% in 2013. As with the 2008 election, BN's other component parties, namely Parti Gerakan Rakyat Malaysia (Gerakan), the Malaysian Chinese Association (MCA) and the Malaysian Indian Congress (MIC), failed to win any seat, leaving UMNO, which won the remaining 10 seats in the Penang State Legislative Assembly, as the state opposition once again.

== Aftermath ==
In 2015, it was revealed that Jho Low, the main financier of Barisan Nasional's failed election campaign, had been involved in the 1Malaysia Development Berhad scandal; Jho allegedly served as BN's senior strategist in Penang, funded free-of-charge public dinners, concerts and lucky draws during the election via the 1Malaysia Penang Welfare Club, and told the BN candidates that his funds would be made available to them upon request. A source from the United Malays National Organisation (UMNO), who spoke on the condition of anonymity, commented that "the money was flowing like hell", adding that the funds, which were initially assumed to originate from corporate donors, did not pass through the party's official channels.

Also in the same year, the Pakatan Rakyat (PR) coalition was disbanded, due to disagreements between the Malaysian Islamic Party (PAS) and the Democratic Action Party (DAP) over the former's insistence to implement the Islamic penal code, known as hudud, in the State of Kelantan. In place of the defunct coalition, the DAP and the People's Justice Party (PKR), together with newcomers, the National Trust Party (Amanah) and the Malaysian United Indigenous Party (PPBM), formed the Pakatan Harapan (PH) in 2017; the PH subsequently announced its Penang leadership line-up as well. As a result of the departure of PAS from the PR, the coalition's successor, the PH, retained 29 seats in the Penang State Legislative Assembly just prior to the 2018 State Election, while PAS controlled a single seat - Permatang Pasir - and UMNO the remaining 10 seats.

== See also ==
- Constituencies of Penang
- Elections in Penang
