= 2008 Penang state election =

Malaysian state election

- 8 March 2008

All 40 seats to the State Legislative Assembly 21 seats needed for a majority
- Registered: 709,323
- Turnout: 553,755; 78.07% (▲2.16 pp)
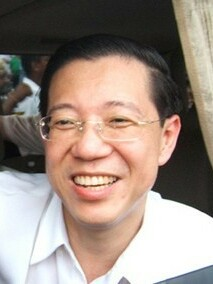

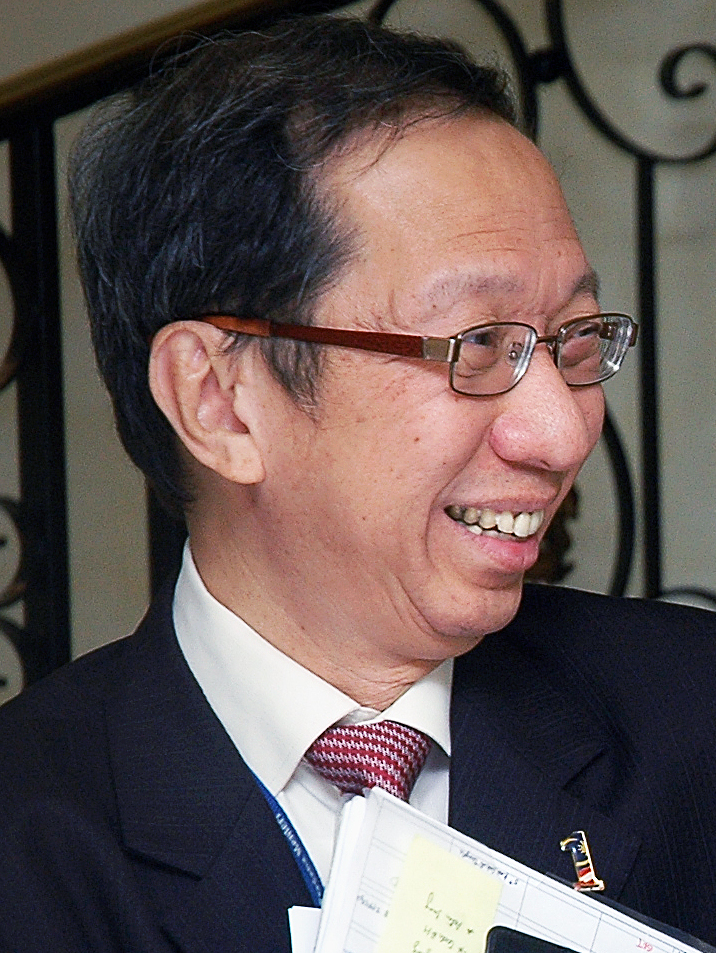
	Majority party	Minority party
Leader	Lim Guan Eng	Koh Tsu Koon
Party	Democratic Action	Gerakan
Alliance	Pakatan Rakyat	Barisan Nasional
Leader since	20 February 2008	21 October 1990
Leader's seat	Air Putih	Tanjong Bunga (Note: Not seeking re-election.)
Last election	2 seats, 36.71%	38 seats, 63.15%
Seats won	29	11
Seat change	▲27	▼27
Popular vote	319,759	222,462
Percentage	58.89%	40.97%
Swing	▲22.18 pp	▼22.18 pp
- Pakatan Rakyat seats: DAP PKR PAS Opposition seats: UMNO
Chief Minister before election
Koh Tsu Koon
Barisan Nasional (Gerakan)
Elected Chief Minister
Lim Guan Eng
Pakatan Rakyat (DAP)

The 2008 Penang state election was held on Saturday, 8 March 2008 to elect all 40 members of the Penang State Legislative Assembly. The opposition Pakatan Rakyat, led by Lim Guan Eng, won a surprise landslide victory against the ruling Barisan Nasional coalition under chief minister Koh Tsu Koon, ending its 39-year hold on the Penang state government.

Pakatan Rakyat, under a three-party coalition between the Democratic Action Party (DAP), the People's Justice Party (PKR) and the Malaysian Islamic Party (PAS) secured 29 seats and an 18 seat majority, including a two-thirds majority in the legislature. It was the first time since 1969 a ruling party was voted out in Penang, and as of 2025, was the last time a transfer of power took place in the Penang state government. Lim Guan Eng was sworn into power as chief minister on 11 March 2008.

== Background ==
The election was the 12th state election in the State of Penang since the independence of Malaya (now Malaysia) in 1957. The governing Barisan Nasional (BN) sought to secure their ninth consecutive term in office since 1974.

According to the Constitution of the State of Penang, the maximum term of the Penang State Legislative Assembly, the legislature of Penang, is five years from the date of the first sitting of Assembly following a state election, after which it is dissolved by operation of law. However, the Chief Minister, as the head of government in Penang, may advise the Governor, the head of state, to dissolve the Assembly before the five-year period is up.

On 13 February 2008, the Governor of Penang, Abdul Rahman Abbas, gave his consent to the incumbent Chief Minister of Penang, Koh Tsu Koon, to dissolve the Assembly; the dissolution of the Assembly was conducted simultaneously with the dissolution of the Malaysian Parliament.

A state election must be held within sixty days after the dissolution. Accordingly, the Malaysian Election Commission set 24 February as the nomination day and 8 March as the polling day, providing for a campaigning period of 13 days.

=== Political parties ===
The Barisan Nasional (BN), the ruling coalition in Penang at the time, had been in power since 1955, although BN rule was briefly interrupted after the 1969 election when Gerakan, then an opposition party, seized power in the state; Gerakan subsequently joined the BN in 1973.

Prior to the election, BN, which was led by the incumbent Chief Minister of Penang and Parti Gerakan Rakyat Malaysia (Gerakan) leader, Koh Tsu Koon, controlled 38 out of the 40 state seats in the Penang State Legislative Assembly. BN was opposed by the informal Pakatan Rakyat (PR) coalition, which held the remaining two seats in the Assembly. PR was led by the secretary-general of the Democratic Action Party (DAP), Lim Guan Eng.

Coalition
Incumbent	Opposition
Barisan Nasional (BN)	Pakatan Rakyat
United Malays National Organisation (UMNO); Parti Gerakan Rakyat Malaysia (Gerakan); Malaysian Chinese Association (MCA); Malaysian Indian Congress (MIC)	Democratic Action Party (DAP); People's Justice Party (PKR); Malaysian Islamic Party (PAS)

=== Electoral divisions ===
All 40 state constituencies within Penang, which constitute the Penang State Legislative Assembly, were contested during the election.

The state constituencies of Penang (in blue) as of 2004.
BN-controlled seats
DAP-controlled seats
PAS-controlled seats

== Issues ==
=== Decline of Penang ===
In the preceding years, concerns had been raised over the perceived decline and neglect of Penang. Among the factors were the deteriorating cleanliness in George Town, incoherent urban planning, poor traffic management, the state's economic slowdown and persistent brain drain.

By the early 2000s, Penang's economic growth began to lose steam, with the city-state recording the lowest monthly household income growth rate amongst the Malaysian states. Also in 2001, the Rent Control Act, which until then had protected the low-income residents within the George Town city centre from eviction by preventing any arbitrary hike in rents, was repealed. Consequently, the city centre was hollowed out, as residents and smaller businesses were unable to cope with the rental hikes. This led to the dilapidation of heritage buildings within the city centre, whilst private developers began demolishing pre-war buildings in the name of redevelopment. In addition, the decades of brain drain took its toll, as Penang suffered a shortage of professionals, who generally preferred to move to the Greater Kuala Lumpur area for business and employment opportunities. Poor urban planning and traffic management caused worsening traffic congestion, whilst George Town's garbage-strewn streets led to Penang being labelled a "garbage state" by Barisan Nasional (BN) politicians.

Widespread discontent over Penang's decline led to campaigns by Penang-based non-governmental organisations (NGOs) and the national media to return the city-state to its former glory.

=== Political infighting in Barisan Nasional ===
Prior to the election, Koh Tsu Koon had stated his intention to resign as the Chief Minister of Penang, in order to stand for a position in the national Cabinet; during the election, Koh stood in the Batu Kawan parliamentary constituency. Subsequently, internal squabbles broke out within the Barisan Nasional (BN) over the next person to helm the position of the Chief Minister. While Koh picked Teng Hock Nam to succeed him as the Chief Minister, the then Malaysian Prime Minister, Abdullah Ahmad Badawi, preferred Teng Chang Yeow to succeed Koh. Other BN leaders who also contended for the position of the Chief Minister were Chia Kwang Chye and Lee Kah Choon.

The internal infighting, exacerbated by Koh's indecisiveness, adversely affected BN's campaign in Penang, as the coalition was unable to publicly declare its Chief Minister-designate. In addition, Koh's decision to run for a higher position in the Malaysian federal government was widely scorned; Penangites perceived Koh's party, Parti Gerakan Rakyat Malaysia, as being more interested in promoting its political ambitions in the national level instead of seeing to its constituents' needs.

=== Corruption and maladministration ===
Allegations of corrupt practices by the Barisan Nasional (BN) administration were also abound prior to the election. In early 2008, an online news portal alleged that the incumbent Chief Minister, Koh Tsu Koon, had spent RM10 billion to persuade Motorola to stay in Penang. While Koh initially refused comment, he finally admitted to the issue.

The BN administration was also condemned by Penang-based non-governmental organisations (NGOs) for steamrolling the Penang Global City Centre project, which was the brainchild of Partick Lim, a tycoon who maintained close ties with the then Malaysian Prime Minister, Abdullah Ahmad Badawi. Despite opposition by the NGOs, the BN administration proceeded with the project by bypassing the Penang Island Municipal Council (now Penang Island City Council), thus eliminating any need for approval from the local government. The issue strengthened the perception that Chief Minister Koh, who led Parti Gerakan Rakyat Malaysia (Gerakan), displayed utmost deference to the United Malays National Organisation (UMNO), the dominant party within the BN coalition.

BN's maladministration extended to Penang's two local governments - the Penang Island Municipal Council and the Seberang Perai Municipal Council - which were under the purview of the BN-controlled state government. Both local governments accrued large annual deficits in the preceding years, but more so for the Seberang Perai Municipal Council, which had its lavish headquarters near Bukit Mertajam completed in 2006. Despite this, the Seberang Perai Municipal Council was led by UMNO-appointed councillors, which gave it better access to the UMNO-dominated Malaysian federal government, whereas the Penang Island Municipal Council, headed by Gerakan appointees, did not enjoy such a benefit.

== Campaign ==
The Barisan Nasional (BN) administration in Penang, plagued by various crises, sought to appeal to the clamour of change by employing the slogan "keep reinventing". Even so, the BN had the advantage of incumbency and the backing of the UMNO-led Malaysian federal government. By contrast, the Pakatan Rakyat (PR) coalition, which lacked the resources available to its opponent, launched its theme "just change it", heralding a more aggressive campaign to overthrow the BN-controlled state government.

=== Social media ===
Due to Barisan Nasional's control of the traditional mainstream media, including newspapers, television and radio, the Pakatan Rakyat (PR), led by the Democratic Action Party (DAP), turned to other methods of reaching out to voters. The election was notable for being the first election that was influenced by the alternative media, such as websites, blogs and news portals. The Internet played a vital role in PR's campaign, by allowing critics of the BN administration to air their views on issues which had been deliberately ignored by the mainstream media. The DAP sought to tap into its booming online presence by nominating Jeff Ooi, a blogger, as its candidate for the Jelutong parliamentary constituency on Penang Island.

Owing to the increasing use of mobile phones, the short messaging service (SMS) was also put to use to disseminate information regarding PR rallies during the campaigning period. In addition, voters could register their phone numbers at DAP offices to receive campaign information via SMS.

=== Rallies ===
Both political coalitions held rallies, known in Malay as ceramah, throughout the state during the campaigning period just prior to the polling day. Pakatan Rakyat (PR) rallies, in particular, drew massive turnouts and generated a sizeable sum of donations. By contrast, Barisan Nasional (BN) rallies attracted very few attendees, so much so that some were reportedly cancelled due to the sheer lack of audience.

On 1 March 2008, a PR rally was held at the Han Chiang College in George Town. Among the key speakers in the rally were Lim Guan Eng, Karpal Singh, Jeff Ooi and Anwar Ibrahim. A 10,000-strong crowd attended the rally, which also broke the record for the highest amount of donation collected at that point; RM38,000 were collected during the rally. The rally at Han Chiang College was surpassed only a few days later, when on 6 March, more than 60,000 people thronged the same venue for another PR rally, during which over RM133,000 were collected.

== Results ==
Seats won
1. Pakatan Rakyat (72.5%)
2. Barisan Nasional (27.5%)
Popular vote
1. Pakatan Rakyat (58.9%)
2. Barisan Nasional (41.0%)
3. Independent (0.14%)

Party or alliance		Votes	%	Seats	+/–
Pakatan Rakyat	Democratic Action Party	175,069	32.24	19	+18
Pakatan Rakyat	People's Justice Party	110,872	20.42	9	+9
Pakatan Rakyat	Pan-Malaysian Islamic Party	33,818	6.23	1	0
Pakatan Rakyat	Total	319,759	58.89	29	+27
Barisan Nasional	United Malays National Organisation	93,923	17.30	11	–3
Barisan Nasional	Parti Gerakan Rakyat Malaysia	71,255	13.12	0	–13
Barisan Nasional	Malaysian Chinese Association	50,123	9.23	0	–9
Barisan Nasional	Malaysian Indian Congress	7,161	1.32	0	–2
Barisan Nasional	Total	222,462	40.97	11	–27
Independents		760	0.14	0	0
Total		542,981	100.00	40	0
Valid votes		542,981	98.05		
Invalid/blank votes		10,774	1.95		
Total votes		553,755	100.00		
Registered voters/turnout		709,323	78.07		
Source: ElectionData.MY

An animated electoral map of Penang, depicting the state constituencies gained by the Pakatan Rakyat (PR) in the 2008 Election. BN-controlled seats DAP-controlled seats PKR-controlled seats PAS-controlled seats

The polling on 8 March 2008 was closed by 5.00 p.m. Malaysian time, and was immediately followed by the counting of votes. Preliminary results, streamed online by Malaysiakini, indicated that the Pakatan Rakyat (PR) was in the lead. Unofficial results continued to trickle in throughout the evening as seat after seat, beginning with Pulau Tikus, fell to the PR. By 9.00 p.m., the Malaysian Election Commission confirmed that the Democratic Action Party (DAP), a component party of the PR, won all of the 19 state constituencies it was contesting in Penang.

The outgoing Chief Minister of Penang and the state's Barisan Nasional (BN) leader, Koh Tsu Koon, immediately informed the Governor of Penang, Abdul Rahman Abbas, of the electoral results and subsequently called Penang DAP chairman, Chow Kon Yeow, to congratulate him. At 11.45 p.m., Koh publicly conceded defeat in a televised press conference.

At 12.30 a.m. on 9 March, the top leaders of the PR, led by Lim Guan Eng, held a press conference at the Red Rock Hotel in George Town. Lim thanked Penangites for "allowing the opposition parties to form the Penang state government", and announced that the DAP would form the new state government in cooperation with the People's Justice Party (PKR) and the Malaysian Islamic Party (PAS).

"DAP wishes to state that we will form the next Penang state government in cooperation and coalition with PKR, a government for all Malaysians, embracing Malays, Chinese, Indians and other races... We also hope that the PAS elected wakil rakyat (State Assemblyman) can help this new government." - Lim Guan Eng

During the night, the elected PR State Assemblymen were instructed to remain indoors for fear of reprisals by BN extremists, with their mobile phones kept away to prevent any of the State Assemblymen from being bought over by the BN. PR supporters were also told not to hold street celebrations to prevent any outbreak of post-election violence. PR politicians wished to avoid a repeat of the 1969 race riots in Kuala Lumpur, which occurred after the General Election that year. For similar reasons, Lim Kit Siang, a DAP politician who was in Ipoh at the time, immediately despatched bodyguards over to Lim Guan Eng in Penang.

The election marked the second time the incumbent Penang state government was voted out of power; the first was in 1969. For the first time ever, BN's component parties, Parti Gerakan Rakyat Malaysia, the Malaysian Chinese Association (MCA) and the Malaysian Indian Congress (MIC), lost all their state constituencies and were wiped out of Penang's political scene altogether. The United Malays National Organisation (UMNO), BN's dominant party, became the sole BN party remaining in Penang, securing 11 seats; UMNO thus formed the opposition within the state. Meanwhile, the PR swept 29 out of the 40 seats that form the Penang State Legislative Assembly, winning more than a two-thirds majority in the legislature.

== Aftermath ==
The elected Chief Minister of Penang, Lim Guan Eng, met his predecessor, Koh Tsu Koon, in the Office of the Chief Minister of Penang inside Komtar in George Town on 9 March 2008, promising a smooth transition of power. Lim was sworn in as the Chief Minister in the presence of the Governor of Penang, Abdul Rahman Abbas, at the latter's official residence, The Residency, in George Town at 10.05 a.m. on 11 March.

Chief Minister Lim's first task in office was to waive all summonses and parking tickets issued by both the Penang Island Municipal Council and the Seberang Perai Municipal Council before March 2008. He also began instituting the CAT policy (Competency, Accountability and Transparency) in the Penang state government; in an unprecedented move, Chief Minister Lim himself took to answering questions posed to him online and via press conferences. The CAT policy entails the adoption of the open tender system for state government contracts and projects, to avoid corruption and to promote transparency. Lavish expenses made by the previous state government were cut down as well.

In addition, one of the major initiatives of the new PR-led Penang state government was to abolish the controversial New Economic Policy, which had been implemented throughout Malaysia by the Barisan Nasional since 1971. The decision, which was aimed at refocusing the state government's efforts towards eradicating poverty regardless of ethnicity, was agreed upon by the People's Justice Party (PKR), with the party's leader, Anwar Ibrahim, pledging to "stop this practice of awarding tenders, projects and privatisation to family-related companies and cronies only at states where we are in charge". BN extremists, particularly those from the United Malays National Organisation (UMNO), subsequently held a protest outside Komtar on 14 March.

Following the drastic change in Malaysia's political landscape, Lee Kuan Yew, the first Prime Minister of Singapore, visited Penang and met Chief Minister Lim on 13 June 2009. During the visit, Lee remarked on Penang's poorly maintained infrastructure at the time and opined that one term was inadequate for Chief Minister Lim to implement the necessary changes within Penang.

== See also ==
- Constituencies of Penang
- Elections in Penang
