= Abdul Rahman Abbas =

Malaysian politician

Yang Amat Berbahagia Tun Dato' Seri Utama Abdul Rahman Abbas SMN DUPN DP DMK SPDK SUMW DMPN DJN
- عبدالرحمٰن عبّاس
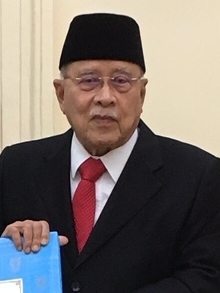
- Abdul Rahman in 2020

7th Governor of Penang
- In office 1 May 2001 – 30 April 2021
- Chief Ministers: Koh Tsu Koon (2001–2008); Lim Guan Eng (2008–2018); Chow Kon Yeow (2018–2021)
- Preceded by: Hamdan Sheikh Tahir
- Succeeded by: Ahmad Fuzi Abdul Razak

6th Speaker of the Penang State Legislative Assembly
- In office 21 October 1990 – 4 April 1995
- Preceded by: Ooi Ean Kwong
- Succeeded by: Yahaya Abdul Hamid
- Constituency: Bertam

Member of the Penang State Legislative Assembly for Bertam
- In office 1977–1995
- Preceded by: Ahmad Badawi Abdullah
- Succeeded by: Hilmi Abdul Rashid

Personal details
- Born: Abdul Rahman bin Abbas; 15 April 1938 (age 88) Permatang Rambai, Kepala Batas, Penang, Straits Settlements
- Citizenship: Malaysia
- Party: United Malays National Organisation
- Spouse: Majimor Shariff
- Education: University of Malaya
- Occupation: Politician
- Profession: Teacher

Abdul Rahman bin Abbas (born 15 April 1938) is a Malaysian politician and teacher who had served as the 7th Governor of Penang from 1 May 2001 to 30 April 2021. He is a former politician from the United Malays National Organisation (UMNO). Abdul Rahman was first appointed to the governorship by the Yang di-Pertuan Agong in May 2001 and was reappointed six times, in 2005, 2009, 2011, 2013, 2015, and 2017 for a total of 20 years, thus becoming the longest-serving governor in Malaysian history.

== Early life, education and early career ==
Tun Abdul Rahman studied at Permatang Sintok Malay School in Kepala Batas and Sultan Idris Teachers College in Tanjong Malim before attending a teaching course at the Language Institute, Kuala Lumpur. He obtained his Bachelor of Arts from the University of Malaya in 1973. After graduating, Abdul Rahman became a teacher.

== Political career ==
Abdul Rahman joined UMNO after ending his career in teaching. He was an Exco member of the party's UMNO Youth wing (1975–1979) and held the position of Kepala Batas Division Treasurer from 1995 to his appointment as Governor.

In 1977, Abdul Rahman was elected to the Penang State Assembly in a by-election following the death of Ahmad Badawi Abdullah, the father of former Prime Minister Abdullah Ahmad Badawi. During the four terms he served, Abdul Rahman was also a member of the state executive council under Chief Minister Lim Chong Eu. In his final term, he was elected Speaker of the State Assembly.

== Yang di-Pertua Negeri of Penang (2001–2021) ==
Abdul Rahman was appointed Yang di-Pertua Negeri of Penang by the 11th Yang di-Pertuan Agong, Sultan Salahuddin Abdul Aziz Shah in May 2001 for four years. In 2005, his term was extended for another four years by Tuanku Syed Sirajuddin. He was reappointed again by Tuanku Mizan Zainal Abidin in 2009 and 2011, by Tuanku Abdul Halim Mu'adzam Shah in 2013 and 2015, and lastly by Sultan Muhammad V in 2017 for another four years.

== Honours & titles of Abdul Rahman Abbas ==
He has been awarded :

=== Titles ===
He holds currently the title of "Tun Dato' Seri Utama" by combination of his highest Federal Malaysian title "Tun" (SMN) and his highest Penang title "Dato' Seri Utama" (DUPN).
In other states of Malaysia, a similar combination between his highest Federal Malaysian title "Tun" (SMN) and his local highest title may be used. Example : Tun Datuk Seri Panglima in Sabah.

=== Honours of Penang ===
- As 7th Yang di-Pertua Negeri of Penang (since 1 May 2001)
  - Order of the Defender of State
    - Member (DJN)
    - Companion (DMPN) – Dato'
    - Knight Grand Commander (DUPN) – Dato' Seri Utama
    - Grand Master

=== Honours of Malaysia ===
- Malaysia
  - Grand Commander of the Order of the Defender of the Realm (SMN) – Tun (2001)
- Federal Territory (Malaysia)
  - Grand Knight of the Order of the Territorial Crown (SUMW) – Datuk Seri Utama (2021)
- Kedah
  - Member of the Supreme Order of Sri Mahawangsa (DMK) – Dato' Seri Utama (2007)
- Sabah
  - Grand Commander of the Order of Kinabalu (SPDK) – Datuk Seri Panglima
- Sarawak
  - Knight Grand Commander of the Order of the Star of Hornbill Sarawak (DP) – Datuk Patinggi

== Honours & titles of Majimor binti Shariff ==
Yang Amat Berbahagia Toh Puan Dato' Seri Utama Hajah Majimor binti Shariff has been awarded :

=== Titles ===
She holds currently the title of "Toh Puan Dato' Seri Utama" by combination of the female form "Toh Puan" connected to her husband's highest Federal Malaysian title "Tun" (SMN) and her highest Penang title "Dato' Seri Utama" (DUPN)

=== Honours of Penang ===
- As wife of the 7th Yang di-Pertua Negeri of Penang (since 1 May 2001)
  - Knight Grand Commander of the Order of the Defender of State (DUPN) with title Dato' Seri Utama

Preceded by Hamdan Sheikh Tahir	Yang di-Pertua Negeri of Penang; 2001-2021	Succeeded by Ahmad Fuzi Abdul Razak
