= Constitution of Penang =

Constitution of the State of Penang

Overview
- Jurisdiction: Penang, Malaysia
- Subordinate to: Federal Constitution of Malaysia
- Created: 5 August 1957
- Date effective: 30 August 1957
- System: Parliamentary democracy Ceremonial head of state

Government structure
- Branches: Two (Legislative and Executive)
- Head of state: Yang di-Pertua Negeri
- Chambers: Unicameral
- Executive: State Executive Council

The Constitution of the State of Penang (Malay: Perlembagaan Negeri Pulau Pinang), introduced in 1957, is the fundamental law of the Malaysian state of Penang. The constitution, which came into effect just before the independence of the Malayan Federation (now Malaysia) from the British Empire, concerns the formation and proceedings of the state government. It also establishes the Governor (Malay: Yang di-Pertua Negeri) as the head of state who acts on the advice of the Chief Minister, the head of government.

== History ==
The Constitution of Penang was drafted following the accession of the then British colony of Penang into the Federation of Malaya. Among the issues pertaining to the drafting of the new constitution for Penang were the establishment of a democratically elected government, the composition of the State Executive Council and the State Legislative Assembly, and the state's powers in the matters of Malay customs and Islamic affairs. The draft constitution was also included in a report published by the Reid Commission, which was tasked with the drafting of the Malayan federal constitution.

The constitution was made under the Federation of Malaya Agreement 1957 and the Federation of Malaya Independence Order in Council 1957, where the state constitution came into effect on 30 August 1957, one day prior to the independence of Malaya from the British Empire. Since then, 18 amendments have been made to the constitution, with the last amendment in force since 16 August 2007.

== Composition ==
The Constitution of Penang consists of five Parts containing 45 articles and two schedules (including 18 amendments).

=== Part I ===
Part 1 contains eleven articles; article 1 to 9, which are further divided into four chapters. It pertains to the powers of the Governor (Malay: Yang di-Pertua Negeri) as the head of state and the Chief Minister as the head of government, as well as the Penang State Executive Council as the executive authority of the state government. It also affirms Islam as the religion of the State, although "other religions may be practised in peace and harmony in any part of the State". In addition, Part 1 addresses the capacity of the state to acquire, hold or dispose of property of any kind, and to sue or be sued.

=== Part II ===
Part 2 consists of eighteen articles; article 10 to 27. It pertains to the establishment and the proceedings of the Penang State Legislative Assembly, the legislature of the State of Penang. Among the issues addressed are the qualifications of the elected State Assemblymen, the summoning, prorogation and dissolution of the legislature, the election of the Speaker, legislative powers and procedures, and the remuneration of the State Assemblymen.

=== Part III ===
Part 3 covers six articles; article 28 to 33, and pertains to the state's financial provisions, including taxation, the annual publication of financial statements, state government's expenditure and Supply Bills.

=== Part IV ===
Part 4 includes five articles; article 34 to 37, and pertains to General Provisions, such as the impartial treatment of the state government's employees, as well as the amendment, interpretation and reprinting of the Constitution.

=== Part V ===
Part 5, which contains five articles; article 38 to 42, pertains to Transitional Provisions which took effect upon the independence of the Federation of Malaya in 1957. Among the issues addressed within Part 5 are the appointment of the first Governor of Penang, the proceedings of the state government during a specified transition period and the transfer of officers.

=== Schedules ===
- First Schedule: Forms of Oaths and Affirmations
- Second Schedule: Provisions of the Federation of Malaya Order in Council 1948
