= Penang State Legislative Assembly =

Legislative branch of the Penang state government

Penang State Legislative Assembly Dewan Undangan Negeri Pulau Pinang
- 15th State Legislative Assembly

Type
- Type: Unicameral

History
- Founded: 11 July 1959; 67 years ago

Leadership
- Governor: Ramli Ngah Talib since 1 May 2025
- Speaker: Law Choo Kiang, PH–PKR since 28 June 2013
- Deputy Speaker: Azrul Mahathir Aziz, PH–AMANAH since 29 August 2023
- Chief Minister: Chow Kon Yeow, PH–DAP since 14 May 2018
- Leader of the Opposition: Muhammad Fauzi Yusoff, PN–PAS since 17 November 2023
- Secretary: Maheswari Malayandy

Structure
- Seats: 40; Quorum: 13; Simple majority: 21; Two-thirds majority: 27
- Political groups: (As of 6 July 2024) Government (29); PH (27): DAP (19); PKR (7); AMANAH (1); BN (2): UMNO (2); Opposition (11); PN (11): PAS (7); BERSATU (4); Speaker (1) PH (non-MLA)
- Committees: 5: Public Accounts Committee; Rights and Privileges Committee; Assembly Committee; Rules of Proceedings Committee; Constitutional Committee

Elections
- Voting system: Plurality First-past-the-post
- Last election: 12 August 2023
- Next election: By 28 October 2028

Meeting place
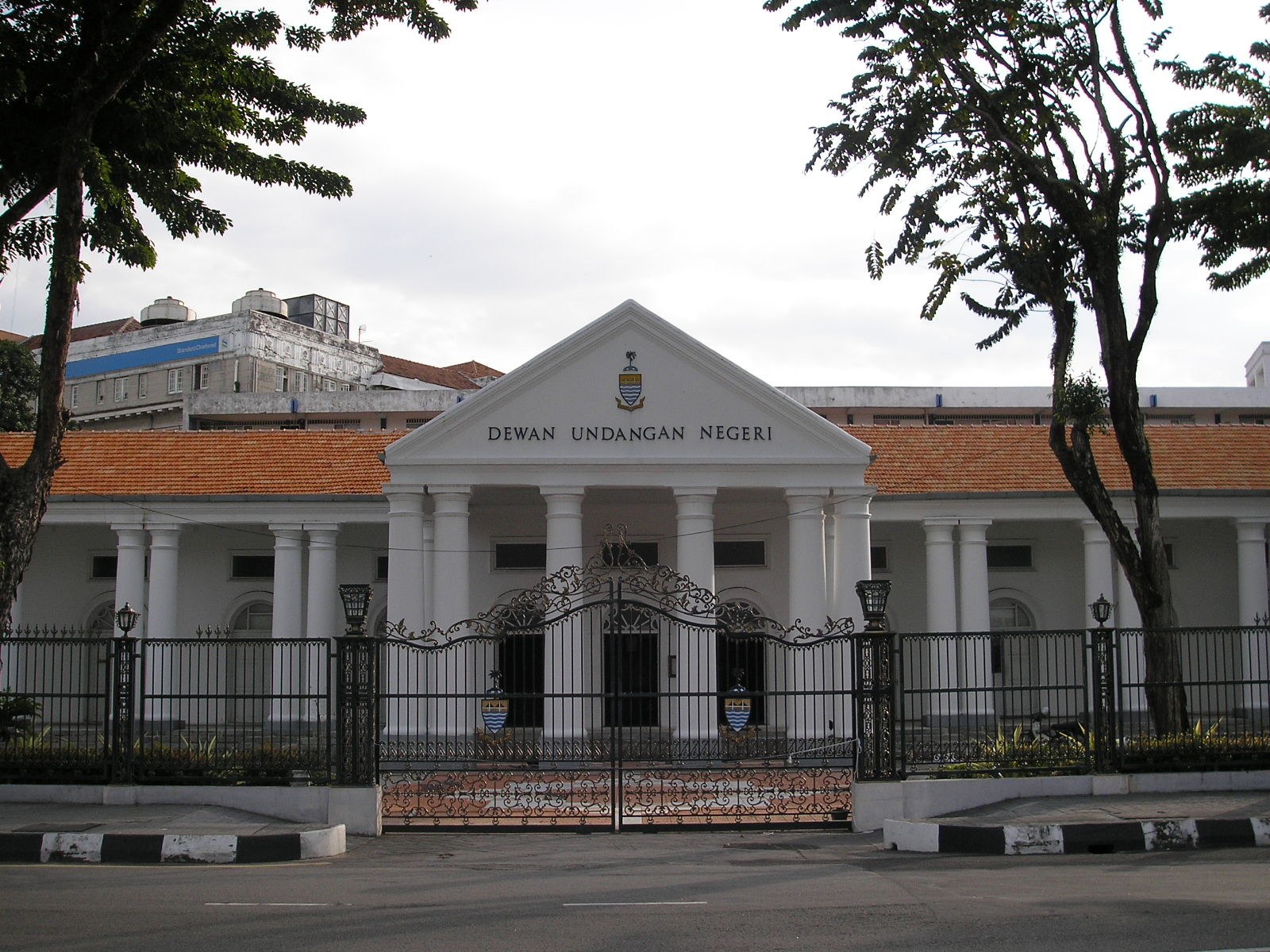
- Penang State Assembly Building, Light Street, George Town, Penang

Website
- dun.penang.gov.my

The Penang State Legislative Assembly is the legislature of the Malaysian state of Penang. It is a unicameral institution, consisting of a total of 40 elected lawmakers representing single-member constituencies throughout Penang. The state legislature, whose members are called "State Assemblymen", convenes at the Penang State Assembly Building in Penang's capital city of George Town. The Penang State Executive Council, the executive branch of the Penang state government, is drawn from among the State Assemblymen.

After the 2023 Penang state election, 29 out of 40 seats are held by the Pakatan Harapan (PH) and Barisan Nasional (BN). The PH–BN alliance thus command a supermajority in the legislature. Meanwhile, 11 seats are held by the Perikatan Nasional (PN) opposition coalition.

Map of current constituencies (since 2018)

== Current composition ==
Government				Opposition
PH			BN	PN
27			2	11
19	7	1	2	7	4
DAP	PKR	AMANAH	UMNO	PAS	BERSATU

No.	Parliamentary Constituency	No.	State Constituency	Member	Coalition (Party)	Post
-	-	-	Non-MLA	Law Choo Kiang	PH (PKR)	Speaker
P041	Kepala Batas	N01	Penaga	Mohd Yusni Mat Piah	PN (PAS)	N/A
P041	Kepala Batas	N02	Bertam	Reezal Merican Naina Merican	BN (UMNO)	N/A
P041	Kepala Batas	N03	Pinang Tunggal	Bukhori Ghazali	PN (PAS)	N/A
P042	Tasek Gelugor	N04	Permatang Berangan	Mohd Sobri Saleh	PN (PAS)	N/A
P042	Tasek Gelugor	N05	Sungai Dua	Muhammad Fauzi Yusoff	PN (PAS)	Opposition Leader
P042	Tasek Gelugor	N06	Telok Ayer Tawar	Azmi Alang	PN (BERSATU)	N/A
P043	Bagan	N07	Sungai Puyu	Phee Syn Tze	PH (DAP)	N/A
P043	Bagan	N08	Bagan Jermal	Chee Yeeh Keen	PH (DAP)	N/A
P043	Bagan	N09	Bagan Dalam	Kumaran Krishnan	PH (DAP)	N/A
P044	Permatang Pauh	N10	Seberang Jaya	Izhar Shah Arif Shah	PN (BERSATU)	N/A
P044	Permatang Pauh	N11	Permatang Pasir	Amir Hamzah Abdul Hashim	PN (PAS)	N/A
P044	Permatang Pauh	N12	Penanti	Zulkefli Bakar	PN (BERSATU)	N/A
P045	Bukit Mertajam	N13	Berapit	Heng Lee Lee	PH (DAP)	N/A
P045	Bukit Mertajam	N14	Machang Bubuk	Lee Khai Loon	PH (PKR)	N/A
P045	Bukit Mertajam	N15	Padang Lalang	Daniel Gooi Zi Sen	PH (DAP)	EXCO Member
P046	Batu Kawan	N16	Perai	Sundarajoo Somu	PH (DAP)	EXCO Member
P046	Batu Kawan	N17	Bukit Tengah	Gooi Hsiao Leung	PH (PKR)	N/A
P046	Batu Kawan	N18	Bukit Tambun	Goh Choon Aik	PH (PKR)	EXCO Member
P047	Nibong Tebal	N19	Jawi	Jason H'ng Mooi Lye	PH (DAP)	EXCO Member
P047	Nibong Tebal	N20	Sungai Bakap	Abidin Ismail	PN (PAS)	N/A
P047	Nibong Tebal	N21	Sungai Acheh	Rashidi Zinol	BN (UMNO)	EXCO Member
P048	Bukit Bendera	N22	Tanjong Bunga	Zairil Khir Johari	PH (DAP)	EXCO Member
P048	Bukit Bendera	N23	Air Putih	Lim Guan Eng	PH (DAP)	Former Chief Minister of Penang; MP for Bagan
P048	Bukit Bendera	N24	Kebun Bunga	Lee Boon Heng	PH (PKR)	N/A
P048	Bukit Bendera	N25	Pulau Tikus	Joshua Woo Sze Zeng	PH (DAP)	N/A
P049	Tanjong	N26	Padang Kota	Chow Kon Yeow	PH (DAP)	Chief Minister; MP for Batu Kawan
P049	Tanjong	N27	Pengkalan Kota	Wong Yuee Harng	PH (DAP)	N/A
P049	Tanjong	N28	Komtar	Teh Lai Heng	PH (DAP)	N/A
P050	Jelutong	N29	Datok Keramat	Jagdeep Singh Deo	PH (DAP)	Deputy Chief Minister II
P050	Jelutong	N30	Sungai Pinang	Lim Siew Khim	PH (DAP)	EXCO Member
P050	Jelutong	N31	Batu Lancang	Ong Ah Teong	PH (DAP)	N/A
P051	Bukit Gelugor	N32	Seri Delima	Connie Tan Hooi Peng	PH (DAP)	N/A
P051	Bukit Gelugor	N33	Air Itam	Joseph Ng Soon Siang	PH (DAP)	N/A
P051	Bukit Gelugor	N34	Paya Terubong	Wong Hon Wai	PH (DAP)	EXCO Member
P052	Bayan Baru	N35	Batu Uban	Kumaresan Aramugam	PH (PKR)	N/A
P052	Bayan Baru	N36	Pantai Jerejak	Fahmi Zainol	PH (PKR)	N/A
P052	Bayan Baru	N37	Batu Maung	Mohamad Abdul Hamid	PH (PKR)	Deputy Chief Minister I
P053	Balik Pulau	N38	Bayan Lepas	Azrul Mahathir Aziz	PH (AMANAH)	Deputy Speaker
P053	Balik Pulau	N39	Pulau Betong	Mohamad Shukor Zakariah	PN (PAS)	N/A
P053	Balik Pulau	N40	Telok Bahang	Muhamad Kasim	PN (BERSATU)	N/A

== Seating arrangement ==
The seating arrangement of the Penang State Legislative Assembly is as follows.

N08 Bagan Jermal	N27 Pengkalan Kota	N33 Air Itam	N31 Batu Lancang	N17 Bukit Tengah	N13 Berapit	N14 Machang Bubok	N36 Pantai Jerejak
		N35 Batu Uban	N28 Komtar	N02 Bertam	N23 Air Putih
N32 Seri Delima		B					Vacant
N25 Pulau Tikus							N38 Bayan Lepas (Deputy Speaker)
N24 Kebun Bunga	N10 Seberang Jaya	C			A	N34 Paya Terubong (EXCO Member)	N18 Bukit Tambun (EXCO Member)
N09 Bagan Dalam	N11 Permatang Pasir	C			A	N22 Tanjong Bunga (EXCO Member)	N16 Perai (EXCO Member)
N07 Sungai Puyu	N06 Telok Ayer Tawar	C			A	N21 Sungai Acheh (EXCO Member)	N15 Padang Lalang (EXCO Member)
N20 Sungai Bakap	N03 Pinang Tunggal	C			A	N29 Datok Keramat (Deputy Chief Minister II)	N19 Jawi (EXCO Member)
N39 Pulau Betong	N01 Penaga	C			A	N37 Batu Maung (Deputy Chief Minister I)	N30 Sungai Pinang (EXCO Member)
N40 Telok Bahang	N12 Penanti	C			A	State Legal Advisor	State Financial Officer
N04 Permatang Berangan	N05 Sungai Dua (Opposition Leader)	C	Secretary		A	N26 Padang Kota (Chief Minister)	State Secretary
			Speaker
			Yang Di-Pertua Negeri

== Role ==
The Penang State Legislative Assembly's main function is to enact legislation and policies relating to the State List and Joint List as defined in the Federal Constitution. Its members also provide oversight on the state's executive branch of government, ensuring the state departments and agencies enforce the aforementioned legislation. Debates in the Assembly are presided over by the Speaker.

The leader of the party or coalition with a majority in the Assembly is appointed the Chief Minister by the Tuan Yang Terutama Tun Yang di-Pertua Negeri of Penang. The Chief Minister heads the state's executive, known as the State Executive Council, whose members are also drawn from the Assembly.

== Committees ==
The State Assembly also consists of committees to handle administrative matters. The committees include:

- Public Accounts Committee
- Committee on Privileges
- House Committee
- Standing Orders Committee
- Constitution Committee

== Speakers Roll of Honour ==
The following is the Speaker of the Penang State Legislative Assembly Roll of Honour, since 1959:

No.	Speaker	Term start	Term end	Party	Constituency
1	Sulaiman Ahmad	6 January 1959	1 April 1964	Alliance (UMNO)	Alma
1	Sulaiman Ahmad	25 April 1964	19 March 1969	Alliance (UMNO)	Alma
2	Harun Sirat	10 May 1969	31 July 1974	Gerakan	Alma
2	Harun Sirat	24 August 1974	16 June 1978	BN (Gerakan)	Bukit Tengah
3	Hassan Md Noh	8 July 1978	29 March 1982	BN (UMNO)	Penaga
4	Teh Ewe Lim	22 April 1982	19 July 1986	BN (Gerakan)	Datok Keramat
5	Ooi Ean Kwong	3 August 1986	5 October 1990	BN (Gerakan)	Datok Keramat
6	Abdul Rahman Abbas	21 October 1990	4 April 1995	BN (UMNO)	Bertam
7	Yahaya Abdul Hamid	25 April 1995	10 November 1999	BN (UMNO)	Pinang Tunggal
7	Yahaya Abdul Hamid	29 November 1999	2 March 2004	BN (UMNO)	Pinang Tunggal
7	Yahaya Abdul Hamid	21 March 2004	12 February 2008	BN (UMNO)	Non-MLA
8	Abdul Halim Hussain	8 March 2008	27 June 2013	PR (PKR)	Non-MLA
9	Law Choo Kiang	28 June 2013	10 April 2018	PH (PKR)	Bukit Tambun
9	Law Choo Kiang	2 August 2018	28 June 2023	PH (PKR)	Non-MLA
9	Law Choo Kiang	29 August 2023	Incumbent	PH (PKR)	Non-MLA

== Election pendulum ==
The 2023 Penang state election witnessed 29 governmental seats and 11 non-governmental seats filled the Penang State Legislative Assembly. The government side has 25 safe seats and 1 fairly safe seats, while the non-government side has 4 safe seats and 3 fairly safe seats.

2023 Penang state election

GOVERNMENT SEATS
Marginal
Sungai Acheh	Rashidi Zainol	UMNO	50.33
Bayan Lepas	Azrul Mahathir Aziz	AMANAH	52.35
Batu Maung	Mohamad Abdul Hamid	PKR	54.65
Fairly safe
Bertam	Reezal Merican Naina Merican	UMNO	56.24
Safe
Sungai Pinang	Lim Siew Khim	DAP	65.13
Bukit Tengah	Gooi Hsiao-Leung	PKR	68.58
Machang Bubok	Lee Khai Loon	PKR	69.12
Pantai Jerejak	Fahmi Zainol	PKR	69.94
Bagan Dalam	Kamaran Krishnan	DAP	71.49
Tanjong Bunga	Zairil Khir Johari	DAP	72.82
Datok Keramat	Jagdeep Singh Deo	DAP	72.61
Perai	Sundarajoo Somu	DAP	76.76
Batu Uban	Kumaresan Aramugam	PKR	76.83
Jawi	H’ng Mooi Lye	DAP	79.50
Air Itam	Joseph Ng Soon Seong	DAP	79.22
Seri Delima	Connie Tan Hooi Peng	DAP	80.57
Bukit Tambun	Goh Choon Aik	PKR	80.64
Bagan Jermal	Chee Yeeh Keen	DAP	84.77
Air Putih	Lim Guan Eng	DAP	85.63
Pulau Tikus	Joshua Woo Sze Zeng	DAP	85.09
Komtar	Teh Lai Heng	DAP	86.61
Padang Kota	Chow Kon Yeow	DAP	87.83
Kebun Bunga	Lee Boon Heng	PKR	87.83
Padang Lalang	Daniel Gooi Zi Sen	DAP	87.85
Sungai Puyu	Phee Syn Tze	DAP	90.48
Paya Terubong	Wong Hon Wai	DAP	91.58
Batu Lancang	Ong Ah Teong	DAP	92.12
Berapit	Heng Lee Lee	DAP	94.44
Pengkalan Kota	Wong Yee Harng	DAP	94.64

NON-GOVERNMENT SEATS
Marginal
Sungai Bakap	Nor Zamri Latiff	PAS	52.67
Pulau Betong	Mohamad Shukor Zakariah	PAS	52.92
Telok Bahang	Muhamd Kasim	BERSATU	53.48
Telok Ayer Tawar	Azmi Alang	BERSATU	55.26
Fairly Safe
Permatang Pasir	Amir Hamzah Abdul Hashim	PAS	56.49
Seberang Jaya	Izhar Shah Arif Shah	BERSATU	56.69
Penanti	Zulkefli Bakar	BERSATU	58.28
Safe
Sungai Dua	Muhammad Fauzi Yusoff	PAS	62.26
Pinang Tunggal	Bukhori Ghazali	PAS	62.74
Penaga	Mohd. Yusni Mat Piah	PAS	63.24
Permatang Berangan	Mohd Sobri Saleh	PAS	69.50

== List of Assemblies ==
Assembly	Term began	Members	Committee	Governing parties
Settlement Council	1955	25	Wong Pow Nee I (1957–1959)	Alliance (MCA–UMNO–MIC)
1st	1959	24	Wong Pow Nee II	Alliance (MCA–UMNO–MIC)
2nd	1964	24	Wong Pow Nee III	Alliance (MCA–UMNO–MIC)
3rd	1969	24	Lim Chong Eu I	GERAKAN (1969–1972) GERAKAN–Alliance (UMNO) (1972–1973)
3rd	1969	24	Lim Chong Eu I	BN (GERAKAN–UMNO) (1973–1974)
4th	1974	27	Lim Chong Eu II	BN (GERAKAN–UMNO–MCA–MIC–PAS) (1974–1977) BN (GERAKAN–UMNO–MCA–MIC) (1977–1978)
5th	1978	27	Lim Chong Eu III	BN (GERAKAN–UMNO–MCA–MIC)
6th	1982	27	Lim Chong Eu IV	BN (GERAKAN–UMNO–MCA–MIC)
7th	1986	33	Lim Chong Eu V	BN (GERAKAN–UMNO–MCA)
8th	1990	33	Koh Tsu Koon I	BN (GERAKAN–UMNO)
9th	1995	33	Koh Tsu Koon II	BN (GERAKAN–UMNO–MCA–MIC)
10th	1999	33	Koh Tsu Koon III	BN (GERAKAN–UMNO–MCA–MIC)
11th	2004	40	Koh Tsu Koon IV	BN (GERAKAN–UMNO–MCA–MIC)
12th	2008	40	Lim Guan Eng I	PR (DAP–PKR–PAS)
13th	2013	40	Lim Guan Eng II	PR (DAP–PKR–PAS) (2013–2015)
13th	2013	40	Lim Guan Eng II	PH (DAP–PKR) (2015–2018)
14th	2018	40	Chow Kon Yeow I	PH (DAP–PKR–AMANAH–BERSATU) (2018–2020) PH (DAP–PKR–AMANAH) (2020–2022)
14th	2018	40	Chow Kon Yeow I	PH (DAP–PKR–AMANAH)–BN (UMNO)(2022–2023)
15th	2023	40	Chow Kon Yeow II	PH (DAP–PKR–AMANAH)–BN (UMNO)

== See also ==
- Penang State Assembly Building
- Penang state government
- Constitution of Penang
- Constituencies of Penang
