= Batu Kawan (federal constituency) =

Malaysian federal constituency

Batu Kawan (P046)
Penang constituency

Federal constituency
- Legislature: Dewan Rakyat
- MP: Chow Kon Yeow; PH
- Constituency created: 2003
- First contested: 2004
- Last contested: 2022

Demographics
- Population (2020): 164,468
- Electors (2023): 89,610
- Area (km²): 129
- Pop. density (per km²): 1,274.9

Batu Kawan is a federal constituency in South Seberang Perai District and Central Seberang Perai District, Penang, Malaysia, that has been represented in the Dewan Rakyat since 2004.

The federal constituency was created in the 2003 redistribution and is mandated to return a single member to the Dewan Rakyat under the first past the post voting system.

== Demographics ==
https://live.chinapress.com.my/ge15/parliament/PENANG

Ethnic breakdown of Batu Kawan's electorate as of 2022
1. Chinese (54.1%)
2. Malay (23.7%)
3. Indian (21.9%)
4. Other ethnicities (0.30%)

As of 2020, Batu Kawan has a population of 164,468 people.

Age breakdown of Batu Kawan's electorate as of 2022
1. 18-20 (6.37%)
2. 21-29 (20.3%)
3. 30-39 (20.0%)
4. 40-49 (17.9%)
5. 50-59 (16.0%)
6. 60-69 (11.6%)
7. 70-79 (5.76%)
8. 80-89 (1.72%)
9. above 90 (0.34%)
Gender breakdown of Batu Kawan's electorate as of 2022
1. Male (49.0%)
2. Female (51.0%)

== History ==
=== Polling districts ===
According to the federal gazette issued on 18 July 2023 the Batu Kawan constituency is divided into 24 polling districts.

State constituency	Polling Districts	Code	Location
Perai (N16)	Taman Indrawasih	046/16/01	SMK Taman Inderawasih
Perai (N16)	Taman Chai Leng	046/16/02	SK Taman Inderawasih
Perai (N16)	Perai	046/16/03	SJK (T) Perai
Perai (N16)	Taman Perai	046/16/04	SK Khir Johari
Perai (N16)	Taman Supreme	046/16/05	SMK Prai
Perai (N16)	Taman Kimsar	046/16/06	SJK (C) Chung Hwa 3
Bukit Tengah (N17)	Kampong Jawa	046/17/01	SJK (T) Ladang Prye
Bukit Tengah (N17)	Jalan Pengkalan	046/17/02	SK Kebun Sireh
Bukit Tengah (N17)	Kebun Sireh	046/17/03	SK Kebun Sireh
Bukit Tengah (N17)	Bukit Tengah	046/17/04	SJK (C) Peng Bin
Bukit Tengah (N17)	Kuala Juru	046/17/05	SK Juru; SJK (T) Juru
Bukit Tengah (N17)	Juru	046/17/06	SJK (C) True Light
Bukit Tengah (N17)	Taman Perwira	046/17/07	SMK Taman Perwira
Bukit Tengah (N17)	Taman Sejati	046/17/08	SJK (C) Peng Bin
Bukit Tengah (N17)	Taman Sentul Jaya	046/17/09	SMK Permai Indah
Bukit Tambun (N18)	Pulau Aman	046/18/01	Dewan Serbaguna Pulau Aman
Bukit Tambun (N18)	Batu Kawan	046/18/02	SMK Batu Kawan
Bukit Tambun (N18)	Bukit Tambun	046/18/03	SK Bkt Tambun
Bukit Tambun (N18)	Taman Merak	046/18/04	SK Taman Merak; SJK (C) Keng Koon
Bukit Tambun (N18)	Kampong Baharu	046/18/05	SMK Simpang Empat
Bukit Tambun (N18)	Ladang Valdor	046/18/06	SJK (T) Ladang Valdor
Bukit Tambun (N18)	Perkampungan Valdor	046/18/07	SMK Valdor
Bukit Tambun (N18)	Badak Mati	046/18/08	SK Bakap Indah
Bukit Tambun (N18)	Rumah Murah Valdor	046/18/09	SJK (C) Kampung Valdor

=== Representation history ===
Members of Parliament for Batu Kawan
Parliament	No	Years	Member	Party	Vote Share
Constituency created from Bagan, Bukit Mertajam and Nibong Tebal
11th	P046	2004–2008	Huan Cheng Guan (范清渊)	BN (GERAKAN)	17,097; 53.85%
12th	P046	2008–2013	Ramasamy Palanisamy (இராமசாமி பழனிசாமி)	PR (DAP)	23,067; 62.94%
13th	P046	2013–2015	Kasthuriraani Patto (கஸ்தூரி பட்டு)	PR (DAP)	36,636; 74.14%
13th	P046	2015–2018	Kasthuriraani Patto (கஸ்தூரி பட்டு)	PH (DAP)	36,636; 74.14%
14th	P046	2018–2022	Kasthuriraani Patto (கஸ்தூரி பட்டு)	PH (DAP)	42,683; 78.02%
15th	P046	2022–present	Chow Kon Yeow (曹观友)	PH (DAP)	50,744; 73.72%

=== State constituency ===
Parliamentary constituency	State constituency						
Parliamentary constituency	1955–1959*	1959–1974	1974–1986	1986–1995	1995–2004	2004–2018	2018–present
Batu Kawan						Bukit Tambun	
Batu Kawan						Bukit Tengah	
Batu Kawan						Perai	

=== Historical boundaries ===
State Constituency	Area	
State Constituency	2004	2018
Bukit Tambun	Bandar Cassia; Bukit Tambun; Pulau Aman; Simpang Ampat; Valdor	
Bukit Tengah	Bukit Minyak; Bukit Tengah; Juru; Kebun Sireh; Taman Pewira	
Perai	Perai; Taman Chai Leng; Taman Kimsar; Taman Perai; Taman Supreme	

=== Current state assembly members ===
No.	State Constituency	Member	Coalition (Party)
N16	Perai	Sundarajoo Somu	PH (DAP)
N17	Bukit Tengah	Gooi Hsiao Leung	PH (PKR)
N18	Bukit Tambun	Goh Choon Aik	PH (PKR)

=== Local governments & postcodes ===
No.	State Constituency	Local Government	Postcode
N16	Perai	Seberang Perai City Council	13600, 13609, 13700 Perai; 14100, 14110 Simpang Ampat; 14200 Sungai Jawi
N17	Bukit Tengah	Seberang Perai City Council	13600, 13609, 13700 Perai; 14100, 14110 Simpang Ampat; 14200 Sungai Jawi
N18	Bukit Tambun	Seberang Perai City Council	13600, 13609, 13700 Perai; 14100, 14110 Simpang Ampat; 14200 Sungai Jawi

== Election results ==
Malaysian general election, 2022
Party	Candidate	Votes	%	∆%
PH	Chow Kon Yeow	50,744	73.72	▲73.72
PN	Wong Chia Zhen	10,344	15.03	▲15.03
BN	Tan Lee Huat	7,145	10.38	▼6.31
Heritage	Ong Chin Wen	450	0.65	▲0.65
Parti Rakyat Malaysia	Lee Ah Liang	148	0.22	▲0.22
Total valid votes		68,831	100.00	
Total rejected ballots		839		
Unreturned ballots		89		
Turnout		69,759	78.50	▼6.34
Registered electors		88,812		
Majority		40,400	58.69	▼2.64
PH hold		Swing		
Source(s) https://lom.agc.gov.my/ilims/upload/portal/akta/outputp/1753273/PUB609%20(2022).pdf

Malaysian general election, 2018
Party	Candidate	Votes	%	∆%
DAP	Kasthuriraani Patto	42,683	78.02	▲78.02
BN	Jayanthi Devi Balaguru	9,130	16.69	▼4.91
PAS	Jay Kumar Balakrishna	2,636	4.82	▲4.82
Penang Front Party	Ooi Khar Giap	256	0.47	▲0.47
Total valid votes		54,705	100.00	
Total rejected ballots		675		
Unreturned ballots		99		
Turnout		55,479	84.84	▼2.48
Registered electors		65,394		
Majority		33,553	61.33	▲8.79
DAP hold		Swing		
Source(s) "His Majesty's Government Gazette - Notice of Contested Election, Parliament for the State of Penang [P.U. (B) 236/2018]" (PDF). Attorney General's Chambers of Malaysia. 3 May 2018. "Federal Government Gazette - Results of Contested Election and Statements of the Poll after the Official Addition of Votes, Parliamentary Constituencies for the State of Penang [P.U. (B) 310/2018]" (PDF). Attorney General's Chambers of Malaysia. 28 May 2018.

Malaysian general election, 2013
Party	Candidate	Votes	%	∆%
DAP	Kasthuriraani Patto	36,636	74.14	▲11.20
BN	Gobalakrishnan Narayanasamy	10,674	21.60	▼15.46
Love Malaysia Party	Huan Cheng Guan	1,801	3.64	▲3.64
Independent	Mohan Apparoo	305	0.62	▲0.62
Total valid votes		49,416	100.00	
Total rejected ballots		723		
Unreturned ballots		69		
Turnout		50,208	87.32	▲8.61
Registered electors		57,500		
Majority		25,962	52.54	▲26.66
DAP hold		Swing		
Source(s) "Federal Government Gazette - Notice of Contested Election, Parliament for the State of Penang [P.U. (B) 173/2013]" (PDF). Attorney General's Chambers of Malaysia. 26 April 2013. "Federal Government Gazette - Results of Contested Election and Statements of the Poll after the Official Addition of Votes, Parliamentary Constituencies for the State of Penang [P.U. (B) 214/2013]" (PDF). Attorney General's Chambers of Malaysia. 22 May 2013. Archived from the original (PDF) on 22 March 2019.

Malaysian general election, 2008
Party	Candidate	Votes	%	∆%
DAP	Ramasamy Palanisamy	23,067	62.94	▲42.30
BN	Koh Tsu Koon	13,582	37.06	▼16.79
Total valid votes		36,649	100.00	
Total rejected ballots		640		
Unreturned ballots		3		
Turnout		37,292	78.71	▲3.09
Registered electors		47,378		
Majority		9,485	25.88	▼2.76
DAP gain from BN		Swing		?

Malaysian general election, 2004
Party	Candidate	Votes	%
BN	Huan Cheng Guan	17,097	53.85
PKR	Law Choo Kiang	8,099	25.51
DAP	Tanasekharan Autherapady	6,552	20.64
Total valid votes		31,748	100.00
Total rejected ballots		811	
Unreturned ballots		0	
Turnout		32,559	75.62
Registered electors		43,056	
Majority		8,998	28.64
This was a new constituency created.
