= Bagan (federal constituency) =

Malaysian federal constituency

Bagan (P043)
Penang constituency

Federal constituency
- Legislature: Dewan Rakyat
- MP: Lim Guan Eng; PH
- Constituency created: 1958
- Constituency abolished: 1974
- Constituency re-created: 1984
- First contested: 1959
- Last contested: 2022

Demographics
- Population (2020): 112,712
- Electors (2023): 89,654
- Area (km²): 20
- Pop. density (per km²): 5,635.6

Bagan is a federal constituency in North Seberang Perai District, Penang, Malaysia, that has been represented in the Dewan Rakyat since 1959.

The federal constituency was created in the 1958 redistribution and is mandated to return a single member to the Dewan Rakyat under the first past the post voting system.

== Demographics ==
https://live.chinapress.com.my/ge15/parliament/PENANG

Ethnic breakdown of Bagan's electorate as of 2022
1. Chinese (69.3%)
2. Indian (15.7%)
3. Malay (14.5%)
4. Other ethnicities (0.55%)

As of 2020, Bagan has a population of 112,712 people.

Age breakdown of Bagan's electorate as of 2022
1. 18-20 (4.81%)
2. 21-29 (16.3%)
3. 30-39 (18.3%)
4. 40-49 (18.2%)
5. 50-59 (17.5%)
6. 60-69 (14.4%)
7. 70-79 (7.70%)
8. 80-89 (2.24%)
9. above 90 (0.51%)
Gender breakdown of Bagan's electorate as of 2022
1. Male (49.3%)
2. Female (50.7%)

== History ==
It was abolished in 1974 when it was redistributed. It was re-created in 1984.

=== Polling districts ===
According to the federal gazette issued on 18 July 2023, the Bagan constituency is divided into 24 polling districts.

State constituency	Polling districts	Code	Location
Sungai Puyu (N07)	Bagan Ajam	043/07/01	SK Bagan Ajam
Sungai Puyu (N07)	Permatang Tengah	043/07/02	SMJK Chung Ling Butterworth
Sungai Puyu (N07)	Sungai Puyu	043/07/03	SK Sungai Puyu
Sungai Puyu (N07)	Kampong Bahru	043/07/04	SMK Bagan Jaya
Sungai Puyu (N07)	Bagan Lalang	043/07/05	SK Sungai Puyu
Sungai Puyu (N07)	Taman Merbau	043/07/06	SK Bagan Ajam
Sungai Puyu (N07)	Taman Dedap	043/07/07	SMJK Chung Ling Butterworth
Sungai Puyu (N07)	Taman Bunga Tanjung	043/07/08	SMK Bagan Jaya
Bagan Jermal (N08)	Bagan Jermal	043/08/01	SK Bagan Jermal
Bagan Jermal (N08)	Kubang Buaya	043/08/02	SMK Kampong Kastam
Bagan Jermal (N08)	Kampong Gajah	043/08/03	SJK (C) Chung Hwa Pusat
Bagan Jermal (N08)	Jalan Mengkuang	043/08/04	SK Bagan Tuan Kechil
Bagan Jermal (N08)	Kampong Simpa	043/08/05	SK Mak Mandin
Bagan Jermal (N08)	Mak Mandin	043/08/06	SMK Mak Mandin
Bagan Jermal (N08)	Taman Sukaria	043/08/07	SJK (T) Mak Mandin
Bagan Jermal (N08)	Taman Melor	043/08/08	SJK (C) Kwang Hwa
Bagan Jermal (N08)	Taman Cantik	043/08/09	SJK (C) Mak Mandin
Bagan Dalam (N09)	Bagan Luar	043/09/01	SK St Mark
Bagan Dalam (N09)	Telaga Ayer	043/09/02	SJK (C) Chung Hwa 1
Bagan Dalam (N09)	Taman Bagan	043/09/03	SJK (C) Chung Hwa 2
Bagan Dalam (N09)	Kampong Acham	043/09/04	SK Convent 1, Butterworth
Bagan Dalam (N09)	Sekolah St Marks	043/09/05	SMK Convent Butterworth
Bagan Dalam (N09)	Bagan Dalam	043/09/06	SK Kuala Perai
Bagan Dalam (N09)	Jalan Assumption	043/09/07	SK Sungai Nyior

=== Representation history ===
Members of Parliament for Bagan
Parliament	No	Years	Member	Party	Vote Share
Constituency created from Wellesley North
Parliament of the Federation of Malaya
1st	P031	1959–1963	Tan Cheng Bee (陈清美)	Alliance (MCA)	3,945; 34.76%
Parliament of Malaysia
1st	P031	1963–1964	Tan Cheng Bee (陈清美)	Alliance (MCA)	3,945; 34.76%
2nd	P031	1964–1969	Tan Cheng Bee (陈清美)	Alliance (MCA)	8,925; 51.46%
		1969–1971	Parliament was suspended		
3rd	P031	1971–1973	Tan Cheng Bee (陈清美)	Alliance (MCA)	Uncontested
3rd	P031	1973–1974	Tan Cheng Bee (陈清美)	BN (MCA)	Uncontested
Constituency abolished, renamed to Mata Kuching
Constituency re-created from Mata Kuching and Bukit Mertajam
7th	P040	1986–1990	Teoh Teik Huat (张德发)	DAP	21,759; 55.91%
8th	P040	1990–1995	Lim Hock Seng (林峰成)	GR (DAP)	22,673; 53.18%
9th	P043	1995	Patto Perumal (பாட்டோ பெருமாள்)	GR (DAP)	26,524; 50.11%
9th	P043	1995–1999	Lim Hock Seng (林峰成)	GR (DAP)	27,166; 63.76%
10th	P043	1999–2004	Lim Hock Seng (林峰成)	BA (DAP)	27,757; 52.61%
11th	P043	2004–2008	Lim Hock Seng (林峰成)	DAP	23,095; 54.25%
12th	P043	2008–2013	Lim Guan Eng (林冠英)	PR (DAP)	33,748; 74.29%
13th	P043	2013–2015	Lim Guan Eng (林冠英)	PR (DAP)	46,466; 78.62%
13th	P043	2015–2018	Lim Guan Eng (林冠英)	PH (DAP)	46,466; 78.62%
14th	P043	2018–2022	Lim Guan Eng (林冠英)	PH (DAP)	51,653; 85.96%
15th	P043	2022–present	Lim Guan Eng (林冠英)	PH (DAP)	55,797; 81.27%

=== State constituency ===
Parliamentary constituency	State constituency						
Parliamentary constituency	1955–1959*	1959–1974	1974–1986	1986–1995	1995–2004	2004–2018	2018–present
Bagan		Bagan Ajam					
Bagan						Bagan Dalam	
Bagan				Bagan Jermal			
Bagan		Butterworth					
Bagan				Mak Mandin			
Bagan					Perai		
Bagan				Prai			
Bagan					Sungai Puyu		

=== Historical boundaries ===
State Constituency	Area				
State Constituency	1959	1984	1994	2003	2018
Bagan Ajam	Bagan Jermal; Mak Mandin; Permatang Tok Jaya; Sungai Nyior; Sungai Puyu				
Bagan Dalam				Bagan Dalam; Bagan Luar; Jalan Assumption; Kampong Acham; Taman Bagan	
Bagan Jermal		Bagan Ajam; Bagan Jermal; Bagan Lalang; Taman Mesra Jaya; Taman Sri Ara	Bagan Jermal; Bagan Luar; Kubang Buaya; Raja Uda; Taman Anggerik	Bagan Jermal; Kubang Buaya; Mak Mandin; Raja Uda; Taman Anggerik	
Butterworth	Bagan Dalam; Bagan Luar; Butterworth; Jalan Assumption; Prai				
Mak Mandin		Bagan Luar; Jalan Siram; Mak Mandin; Raja Uda; Sungai Nyior			
Perai		Bagan Dalam; Perai; Taman Kimsar; Taman Perai; Taman Supreme	Perai; Taman Chai Leng; Taman Kimsar; Taman Perai; Taman Supreme		
Sungai Puyu			Bagan Ajam; Bagan Jaya; Bagan Lalang; Mak Mandin; Permatang Tengah	Bagan Ajam; Bagan Jaya; Bagan Lalang; Permatang Tengah; Sungai Puyu	

=== Current state assembly members ===
No.	State Constituency	Member	Coalition (Party)
N07	Sungai Puyu	Phee Syn Tze	PH (DAP)
N08	Bagan Jermal	Chee Yeeh Keen	PH (DAP)
N09	Bagan Dalam	Kumaran Krishnan	PH (DAP)

=== Local governments & postcodes ===
No.	State Constituency	Local Government	Postcode
N07	Sungai Puyu	Seberang Perai City Council	12000, 12100, 12200, 12300, 13000, 13020, 13400 Butterworth
N08	Bagan Jermal	Seberang Perai City Council	12000, 12100, 12200, 12300, 13000, 13020, 13400 Butterworth
N09	Bagan Dalam	Seberang Perai City Council	12000, 12100, 12200, 12300, 13000, 13020, 13400 Butterworth

== Election results ==
Malaysian general election, 2022
Party	Candidate	Votes	%	∆%
PH	Lim Guan Eng	55,797	81.27	▲81.27
PN	Alan Oh @ Oh Teik Choon	6,149	8.96	▲8.96
BN	Tan Chuan Hong	5,385	7.84	▼5.06
PEJUANG	Mohammed Hafiz Bin Mohamed Abu Bakar	1,323	1.93	▲1.93
Total valid votes		68,654	100.00	
Total rejected ballots		738		
Unreturned ballots		124		
Turnout		69,156	77.70	▼7.02
Registered electors		89,447		
Majority		49,648	72.31	▼0.75
PH hold		Swing		
Source(s) https://lom.agc.gov.my/ilims/upload/portal/akta/outputp/1753273/PUB609%20(2022).pdf

Malaysian general election, 2018
Party	Candidate	Votes	%	∆%
PKR	Lim Guan Eng	51,653	85.96	▲85.96
BN	Lee Beng Seng	7,751	12.90	▼7.93
Love Malaysia Party	Huan Cheng Guan	502	0.84	▲0.84
BERSAMA	Koay Xing Boon	181	0.30	▲0.30
Total valid votes		60,087	100.00	
Total rejected ballots		463		
Unreturned ballots		92		
Turnout		60,642	84.72	▼2.56
Registered electors		71,583		
Majority		43,902	73.06	▲15.27
PKR hold		Swing		
Source(s) "His Majesty's Government Gazette - Notice of Contested Election, Parliament for the State of Penang [P.U. (B) 236/2018]" (PDF). Attorney General's Chambers of Malaysia. 3 May 2018. "Federal Government Gazette - Results of Contested Election and Statements of the Poll after the Official Addition of Votes, Parliamentary Constituencies for the State of Penang [P.U. (B) 310/2018]" (PDF). Attorney General's Chambers of Malaysia. 28 May 2018.

Malaysian general election, 2013
Party	Candidate	Votes	%	∆%
DAP	Lim Guan Eng	46,466	78.62	▲4.33
BN	David Chua Teik Siang	12,307	20.83	▼4.88
Love Malaysia Party	Lim Kim Chu	328	0.55	▲0.55
Total valid votes		59,101	100.00	
Total rejected ballots		634		
Unreturned ballots		57		
Turnout		59,792	87.28	▲9.44
Registered electors		68,503		
Majority		34,159	57.79	▲8.91
DAP hold		Swing		
Source(s) "Federal Government Gazette - Notice of Contested Election, Parliament for the State of Penang [P.U. (B) 173/2013]" (PDF). Attorney General's Chambers of Malaysia. 26 April 2013. "Federal Government Gazette - Results of Contested Election and Statements of the Poll after the Official Addition of Votes, Parliamentary Constituencies for the State of Penang [P.U. (B) 214/2013]" (PDF). Attorney General's Chambers of Malaysia. 22 May 2013. Archived from the original (PDF) on 22 March 2019.

Malaysian general election, 2008
Party	Candidate	Votes	%	∆%
DAP	Lim Guan Eng	33,748	74.29	▲20.04
BN	Song Choy Leng	11,678	25.71	▼20.04
Total valid votes		45,426	100.00	
Total rejected ballots		766		
Unreturned ballots		35		
Turnout		46,227	77.84	▲1.88
Registered electors		59,385		
Majority		22,070	48.88	▲40.38
DAP hold		Swing		

Malaysian general election, 2004
Party	Candidate	Votes	%	∆%
DAP	Lim Hock Seng	23,095	54.25	▲1.64
BN	Lim Chien Aun	19,473	45.75	▼1.64
Total valid votes		42,568	100.00	
Total rejected ballots		961		
Unreturned ballots		13		
Turnout		43,542	75.96	▲1.24
Registered electors		57,322		
Majority		3,622	8.50	▲2.98
DAP hold		Swing		

Malaysian general election, 1999
Party	Candidate	Votes	%	∆%
DAP	Lim Hock Seng	27,757	52.61	▼11.15
BN	Tan Tiao Kuen	24,999	47.39	▲11.33
Total valid votes		52,756	100.00	
Total rejected ballots		1,084		
Unreturned ballots		42		
Turnout		53,882	74.72	▲13.51
Registered electors		72,111		
Majority		2,758	5.22	▼22.48
DAP hold		Swing		

Malaysian general by-election, 9 September 1995 Upon the death of incumbent, P. Patto
Party	Candidate	Votes	%	∆%
DAP	Lim Hock Seng	27,166	63.76	▲13.65
BN	Yeoh Khoon Chooi	15,364	36.06	▼13.83
Independent	Tan Kee Chye	75	0.18	▲0.18
Total valid votes		42,605	100.00	
Total rejected ballots		681		
Unreturned ballots		0		
Turnout		43,286	61.21	▼15.68
Registered electors		70,718		
Majority		11,802	27.70	▲27.48
DAP hold		Swing		

Malaysian general election, 1995
Party	Candidate	Votes	%	∆%
DAP	P. Patto	26,524	50.11	▼3.07
BN	Yeoh Khoon Chooi	26,406	49.89	▲3.07
Total valid votes		52,930	100.00	
Total rejected ballots		1,306		
Unreturned ballots		142		
Turnout		54,378	76.89	▲0.03
Registered electors		70,721		
Majority		118	0.22	▼6.14
DAP hold		Swing		

Malaysian general election, 1990
Party	Candidate	Votes	%	∆%
DAP	Lim Hock Seng	22,673	53.18	▼2.73
BN	Sak Cheng Lum	19,959	46.82	▲2.73
Total valid votes		42,632	100.00	
Total rejected ballots		790		
Unreturned ballots		0		
Turnout		43,422	76.86	▲4.55
Registered electors		56,494		
Majority		2,714	6.36	▼5.46
DAP hold		Swing		

Malaysian general election, 1986
Party	Candidate	Votes	%	∆%
DAP	Teoh Teik Huat	21,759	55.91	
BN	Chaw Chek Sam	17,158	44.09	
Total valid votes		38,917	100.00	
Total rejected ballots		927		
Unreturned ballots		0		
Turnout		39,844	72.31	
Registered electors		55,105		
Majority		4,601	11.82	
DAP gain from Alliance		Swing		?

Malaysian general election, 1969
Party	Candidate	Votes	%	∆%
On the nomination day, Tan Cheng Bee won uncontested.
Alliance	Tan Cheng Bee			
Total valid votes			100.00	
Total rejected ballots				
Unreturned ballots				
Turnout				
Registered electors		24,793		
Majority				
Alliance hold		Swing		

Malaysian general election, 1964
Party	Candidate	Votes	%	∆%
Alliance	Tan Cheng Bee	8,925	51.46	▲16.70
Socialist Front	Mohamed Salleh Yaacob	6,564	37.85	▲37.85
PMIP	Shariff Mohamed Isa	983	5.67	▼7.83
UDP	M. P. Mathew	871	5.02	▲5.02
Total valid votes		17,343	100.00	
Total rejected ballots		403		
Unreturned ballots		0		
Turnout		17,746	77.82	▲9.24
Registered electors		22,805		
Majority		2,361	13.61	▲12.18
Alliance hold		Swing		

Malayan general election, 1959
Party	Candidate	Votes	%
Alliance	Tan Cheng Bee	3,945	34.76
Independent	B. H. Oon	3,782	33.33
PPP	Pritam Singh	1,792	15.79
PMIP	Abdullah Abbas	1,532	13.50
Independent	Wee Tiong Ghee	297	2.62
Total valid votes		11,348	100.00
Total rejected ballots		104	
Unreturned ballots		0	
Turnout		11,452	68.58
Registered electors		16,698	
Majority		163	1.43
This was a new constituency created.
