= Phee Boon Poh =

Malaysian politician

Yang Berbahagia Dato' Seri Phee Boon Poh DGPN
- 彭文宝

Member of the Penang State Executive Council
- In office 16 May 2018 – 13 August 2023
- Governor: Abdul Rahman Abbas (2018–2021); Ahmad Fuzi Abdul Razak (2021–2023)
- Chief Minister: Chow Kon Yeow
- Portfolio: Welfare, Caring Society and Environment
- Preceded by: Himself
- Succeeded by: Lim Siew Khim (Welfare); Sundarajoo Somu (Environment); Portfolio abolished (Caring Society)
- Constituency: Sungai Puyu
- In office 9 May 2013 – 14 May 2018
- Governor: Abdul Rahman Abbas
- Chief Minister: Lim Guan Eng
- Portfolio: Welfare, Caring Society and Environment
- Preceded by: Himself (Welfare and Caring Society); Chow Kon Yeow (Environment)
- Succeeded by: Himself
- Constituency: Sungai Puyu
- In office 13 March 2008 – 7 May 2013
- Governor: Abdul Rahman Abbas
- Chief Minister: Lim Guan Eng
- Portfolio: Health, Welfare and Caring Society
- Succeeded by: Himself (Welfare and Caring Society); Afif Bahardin (Health)
- Constituency: Sungai Puyu

State Leader of the Opposition of Penang
- In office 2004–2008
- Governor: Abdul Rahman Abbas
- Chief Minister: Koh Tsu Koon
- Constituency: Sungai Puyu

Member of the Penang State Legislative Assembly for Sungai Puyu
- In office 21 March 2004 – 12 August 2023
- Preceded by: Lee Ah Lee (BN–MCA)
- Succeeded by: Phee Syn Tze (PH–DAP)
- Majority: 407 (2004); 9,201 (2008); 16,207 (2013); 19,569 (2018)

Member of the Penang State Legislative Assembly for Bagan Jermal
- In office 21 October 1990 – 25 April 1995
- Preceded by: Lim Hock Seng (DAP)
- Succeeded by: Sak Cheng Lum (BN–MCA)
- Majority: 4,781 (1990)

Faction represented in Penang State Legislative Assembly
- 1990–1995: Democratic Action Party
- 2004–2018: Democratic Action Party
- 2018–2023: Pakatan Harapan

Personal details
- Born: Phee Boon Poh; 1 December 1951 (age 74) Penang, Federation of Malaya (now Malaysia)
- Citizenship: Malaysian
- Party: Democratic Action Party (DAP)
- Other political affiliations: Gagasan Rakyat (GR) (1990–1995); Barisan Alternatif (BA) (1999–2004); Pakatan Rakyat (PR) (2008–2015); Pakatan Harapan (PH) (since 2015)
- Children: Phee Syn Tze (daughter)
- Occupation: Politician

Phee Boon Poh

Chinese name
- Traditional Chinese: 彭文寶
- Simplified Chinese: 彭文宝
Transcriptions
Standard Mandarin
- Hanyu Pinyin: Péng Wénbǎo
Yue: Cantonese
- Jyutping: Paang4 Man4 Bou2
Southern Min
- Hokkien POJ: Phêⁿ Bûn-pó
- Tâi-lô: Phênn Bûn-pó

Phee Boon Poh (simplified Chinese: 彭文宝; traditional Chinese: 彭文寶; pinyin: Péng Wénbǎo; Jyutping: Paang4 Man4 Bou2; Pe̍h-ōe-jī: Phêⁿ Bûn-pó; Tâi-lô: Phênn Bûn-pó; born 1 December 1951) is a Malaysian politician who served as Member of the Penang State Executive Council (EXCO) in the Pakatan Rakyat (PR) and Pakatan Harapan (PH) state administrations under Chief Ministers Lim Guan Eng and Chow Kon Yeow from March 2008 to August 2023, State Leader of the Opposition of Penang from 2004 to 2008 as well as Member of the Penang State Legislative Assembly (MLA) for Sungai Puyu from March 2004 to August 2023 and Bagan Jermal from October 1990 to April 1995. He is a member of the Democratic Action Party (DAP), a component party of the PH and formerly PR, Barisan Alternatif (BA) and Gagasan Rakyat (GR) coalitions.

== Election results ==
Penang State Legislative Assembly
Year	Constituency	Candidate	Votes	Pct	Opponent(s)	Votes	Pct	Ballots cast	Majority	Turnout
1990	N07 Bagan Jermal	Phee Boon Poh (DAP)	11,244	63.50%	Loong Kok Khoon (MCA)	6,463	36.50%	18,048	4,781	79.97%
1995	N08 Bagan Jermal	Phee Boon Poh (DAP)	6,053	35.77%	Sak Cheng Lum (MCA)	10,871	64.23%	17,392	4,818	75.46%
1999	N07 Sungai Puyu	Phee Boon Poh (DAP)	9,789	47.41%	Lee Ah Lee (MCA)	10,859	52.59%	21,038	1,070	79.97%
2004	N07 Sungai Puyu	Phee Boon Poh (DAP)	7,808	52.02%	Lee Ah Lee (MCA)	7,201	47.98%	15,309	607	78.51%
2008	N07 Sungai Puyu	Phee Boon Poh (DAP)	13,025	77.30%	Teh Lay Cheng (MCA)	3,824	22.70%	17,061	9,201	82.39%
2013	N07 Sungai Puyu	Phee Boon Poh (DAP)	19,381	85.93%	Sum Yoo Keong (MCA)	3,174	14.07%	22,729	16,207	90.00%
2018	N07 Sungai Puyu	Phee Boon Poh (DAP)	21,705	90.17%	Lim Hai Song (MCA)	2,136	8.87%	24,234	19,569	87.60%
2018	N07 Sungai Puyu	Phee Boon Poh (DAP)	21,705	90.17%	Tan Lay Hock (PRM)	101	0.42%	24,234	19,569	87.60%
2018	N07 Sungai Puyu	Phee Boon Poh (DAP)	21,705	90.17%	Neoh Bok Keng (MUP)	79	0.33%	24,234	19,569	87.60%
2018	N07 Sungai Puyu	Phee Boon Poh (DAP)	21,705	90.17%	Ong Yin Yin (PFP)	51	0.21%	24,234	19,569	87.60%

== Honours ==
- Penang
  - Commander of the Order of the Defender of State (DGPN) – Dato' Seri (2023)
