= 1995 Bagan by-election =

Election in Malaysia

← 1995	9 September 1995	1999 →

Bagan seat in the Dewan Rakyat
	DAP	BN	IND
Candidate	Lim Hock Seng	Yeoh Khoon Choi	Tan Kee Chye
Party	DAP	BN (MCA)	Independent
Alliance	GR
Popular vote	27,166	15,364	75
Percentage	63.76%	36.06%	0.18%
Bagan MP before election
P. Patto
DAP
Elected Bagan MP
Lim Hock Seng
DAP

The 1995 Bagan by-election is a by-election for the Dewan Rakyat seat of Bagan in Penang, Malaysia that were held on 9 September 1995. It was called following the death of the incumbent, P. Patto on 12 July 1995.

== Background ==
Patto s/o Perumal, better known as P. Patto, were elected to the Dewan Rakyat in the recently concluded 1995 Malaysian general election in April, winning the Bagan federal seat in Penang in a narrow majority of 118 votes as a Democratic Action Party (DAP) candidate. Bagan Serai-born Patto, who joined DAP in 1972, formerly is the member of Perak State Legislative Assembly for Gopeng from 1974 to 1982, and for Buntong from 1986 to 1990. He were also MP for Menglembu from 1978 to 1982, and MP for Ipoh from 1986 to 1990. Patto unsuccessfully contested Sungai Siput federal seat in 1974 and 1990 (both lost to Samy Vellu from Barisan Nasional (BN)), and also failed to win Petaling federal seat in 1982 (lost to Yeoh Pon San of BN). At the time of his death, he is the deputy secretary-general of DAP.

On 12 July 1995, Patto died at Ipoh Hospital. He was admitted to the hospital 5 days earlier after suffering a heart attack, and his condition were improving until he suffered another attack which claimed his life. Patto's death means that his Bagan federal seat were vacated, and necessitates for by-election be held, as the seat were vacated more that 2 years before the expiry of Malaysian parliament current term.

Election Commission of Malaysia (SPR) has set 9 September 1995 as the election day, with 29 August 1995 as the nomination day.

== Nomination and campaign ==
After nominations closed, it was confirmed there will be a 3-way fight between BN, DAP and an independent candidate for the Bagan seat. BN re-nominated Yeoh Khoon Choi, who was defeated by Patto in the general election 5 months earlier. Yeoh is the MCA Penang assistant secretary dan the party's Bagan division secretary. DAP meanwhile nominated Lim Hock Seng, the party's Penang committee member and DAP Bagan division chairman. Lim was the MP for Bagan from 1990 until 1995, when he instead contested and lost at Bukit Tengah state seat. The independent candidate, Tan Kee Chye, were a DAP member, and have contested the 1980 Pengkalan Kota by-election and 1987 Gopeng by-election as an independent, losing both. He also entered the 1995 general election for the Padang Serai federal seat, but were also defeated.

== Timeline ==
The key dates are listed below.

Date	Event
	Issue of the Writ of Election
29 August 1995	Nomination Day
29 August - 8 September 1995	Campaigning Period
	Early polling day for postal and overseas voters
9 September 1995	Polling Day

== Results ==
Malaysian general by-election, 9 September 1995: Bagan Upon the death of incumbent, P. Patto
Party	Candidate	Votes	%	∆%
DAP	Lim Hock Seng	27,166	63.76	▲13.65
BN	Yeoh Khoon Chooi	15,364	36.06	▼13.83
Independent	Tan Kee Chye	75	0.18	▲0.18
Total valid votes		42,605	100.00	
Total rejected ballots		681		
Unreturned ballots				
Turnout		43,286	61.21	▼15.68
Registered electors		70,718		
Majority		11,802	27.70	▲27.48
DAP hold		Swing		

=== Previous result ===
Malaysian general election, 1995: Bagan
Party	Candidate	Votes	%	∆%
DAP	Patto Perumal	26,524	50.11	▼3.07
BN	Yeoh Khoon Chooi	26,406	49.89	▲3.07
Total valid votes		52,930	100.00	
Total rejected ballots		1,306		
Unreturned ballots		142		
Turnout		54,378	76.89	▲0.03
Registered electors		70,721		
Majority		118	0.22	▼6.14
DAP hold		Swing		
