= Lim Hock Seng =

Malaysian politician

Yang Berbahagia Dato' Seri Lim Hock Seng DGPN DMPN
- 林峰成

Member of the Penang State Executive Council
- In office 13 March 2008 – 2018 (Public Works, Utilities and Transportation)
- Governor: Abdul Rahman Abbas
- Chief Minister: Lim Guan Eng
- Succeeded by: Portfolio abolished (Public Works, Utilities); Zairil Khir Johari (Transportation)
- Constituency: Bagan Jermal

Member of the Malaysian Parliament for Bagan
- In office 9 September 1995 – 8 March 2008
- Preceded by: Patto Perumal (GR–DAP)
- Succeeded by: Lim Guan Eng (PR–DAP)
- Majority: 11,802 (1995)
- In office 1990–1995
- Preceded by: Chaw Chek Sam
- Succeeded by: Patto Perumal (GR–DAP)
- Majority: 2,714 (1990)

Member of the Penang State Legislative Assembly for Bagan Jermal
- In office 8 March 2008 – 9 May 2018
- Preceded by: Ooi Chuan Aik
- Succeeded by: Soon Lip Chee (PH–DAP)
- Majority: 5,873 (2008); 11,855 (2013)
- In office 1986–1990
- Preceded by: Sak Cheng Lum
- Succeeded by: Phee Boon Poh (DAP)
- Majority: 4,070 (1986)

Personal details
- Born: 4 June 1948 (age 77) Penang, Federation of Malaya
- Party: Democratic Action Party (DAP)
- Other political affiliations: Gagasan Rakyat (GR) (1990–1996); Barisan Alternatif (BA) (1999–2004); Pakatan Rakyat (PR) (2008–2015); Pakatan Harapan (PH) (since 2015)
- Occupation: Politician

Lim Hock Seng is a Malaysian politician who served as Member of the Penang State Executive Council (EXCO) in the Pakatan Rakyat (PR) state administration under Chief Minister Lim Guan Eng as well as Member of the Penang State Legislative Assembly (MLA) for Bagan Jermal from August 1986 to October 1990 and March 2008 to May 2018 as well as Member of Parliament (MP) for Bagan from 1990 to 1995 and September 1995 to March 2008. He is a member of Democratic Action Party (DAP), a component party of Pakatan Harapan (PH) and Pakatan Rakyat (PR) coalitions.

== Election results ==
Penang State Legislative Assembly
Year	Constituency	Candidate	Votes	Pct	Opponent(s)	Votes	Pct	Ballots cast	Majority	Turnout
1986	N07 Bagan Jermal	Lim Hock Seng (DAP)	9,966	62.83%	Tan Swee Hueng (MCA)	5,896	27.17%	16,267	4,070	76.09%
1990	N08 Mak Mandin	Lim Hock Seng (DAP)	7,365	50.37%	Michael Chen (MCA)	7,256	49.63%	14,919	109	75.45%
1999	N08 Bagan Jermal	Lim Hock Seng (DAP)	6,597	41.53%	Sak Cheng Lum (MCA)	9,681	59.47%	16,662	3,084	73.14%
2004	N09 Bagan Dalam	Lim Hock Seng (DAP)	4,720	38.80%	Subbaiyah Palaniappan (MIC)	6,687	54.97%	12,420	1,967	72.08%
2004	N09 Bagan Dalam	Lim Hock Seng (DAP)	4,720	38.80%	Abdul Razak Abdul Hamid (PKR)	758	6.23%	12,420	1,967	72.08%
2008	N08 Bagan Jermal	Lim Hock Seng (DAP)	11,099	68.00%	Ooi Chuan Aik (MCA)	5,226	32.00%	16,579	5,873	77.20%
2013	N08 Bagan Jermal	Lim Hock Seng (DAP)	16,416	77.80%	Tan Chuan Hong (MCA)	4,561	21.60%	21,314	11,855	86.60%
2013	N08 Bagan Jermal	Lim Hock Seng (DAP)	16,416	77.80%	Lim Kim Chu (PCM)	115	0.60%	21,314	11,855	86.60%

Parliament of Malaysia
Year	Constituency	Candidate	Votes	Pct	Opponent(s)	Votes	Pct	Ballots cast	Majority	Turnout
1990	P040 Bagan	Lim Hock Seng (DAP)	22,673	53.18%	Sak Cheng Lum (MCA)	19,959	46.82%	43,422	2,714	76.86%
1995	P043 Bagan	Lim Hock Seng (DAP)	27,166	63.76%	Yeoh Khoon Chooi (MCA)	15,364	36.06%	43,286	11,802	61.21%
1995	P043 Bagan	Lim Hock Seng (DAP)	27,166	63.76%	Tan Kee Chye (IND)	75	0.18%	43,286	11,802	61.21%
1999	P043 Bagan	Lim Hock Seng (DAP)	27,757	52.61%	Tan Tiao Kuen (MCA)	24,999	47.39%	53,882	2,758	74.72%
2004	P043 Bagan	Lim Hock Seng (DAP)	23,095	54.25%	Lim Chien Aun (MCA)	19,473	45.75%	43,542	3,622	75.96%

== Honours ==
- Penang
  - Commander of the Order of the Defender of State (DGPN) – Dato' Seri (2024)
  - Companion of the Order of the Defender of State (DMPN) – Dato' (2018)
