= Bagan Dalam (state constituency) =

Electoral district in Malaysia

Bagan Dalam (N09)
Penang constituency

State constituency
- Legislature: Penang State Legislative Assembly
MLA
Kumaran Krishnan
PH
- Constituency created: 1974
- First contested: 1974
- Last contested: 2023

Demographics
- Electors (2023): 21,221
- Area (km²): 7

Bagan Dalam is a state constituency in Penang, Malaysia, that has been represented in the Penang State Legislative Assembly.

The state constituency was first contested in 1974 and is mandated to return a single Assemblyman to the Penang State Legislative Assembly under the first-past-the-post voting system. Since 2018, the State Assemblyman for Bagan Jermal is Satees Muniandy from Democratic Action Party (DAP), which is part of the state's ruling coalition, Pakatan Harapan (PH).

== Definition ==
=== Polling districts ===
According to the Federal Gazette issued on 30 March 2018, the Bagan Dalam constituency is divided into 7 polling districts.

State constituency	Polling districts	Code	Location
Bagan Dalam (N09)	Bagan Luar	043/09/01	SK St Mark
Bagan Dalam (N09)	Telaga Ayer	043/09/02	SJK (C) Chung Hwa 1
Bagan Dalam (N09)	Taman Bagan	043/09/03	SJK (C) Chung Hwa 2
Bagan Dalam (N09)	Kampong Acham	043/04/04	SK Convent 1, Butterworth
Bagan Dalam (N09)	Sekolah St Marks	043/40/05	SMK Convent Butterworth
Bagan Dalam (N09)	Bagan Dalam	043/09/06	SK Kuala Perai
Bagan Dalam (N09)	Jalan Assumption	043/09/07	SK Sungai Nyior

== Demographics ==
Ethnic breakdown of Bagan Dalam's electorate as of 2023
1. Chinese (49.7%)
2. Indian (26.5%)
3. Malay (23.0%)
4. Other ethnicities (0.72%)

Total electors by polling district in 2016
Polling district	Electors
Bagan Luar	1,632
Telaga Ayer	3,120
Taman Bagan	3,472
Kampong Acham	2,217
Sekolah St. Marks	2,020
Bagan Dalam	3,531
Jalan Assumption	2,422
Total	18,414
Source: Malaysian Election Commission

== History ==
The Bagan Jermal state constituency was created and first contested during the 1974 State Election. The state constituency was discontinued in 1986 before being reintroduced in 2004.

Penang State Legislative Assemblyman for Bagan Dalam
Assembly	No	Years	Member	Party
Constituency created from Butterworth and Bagan Ajam
4th	N06	1974 – 1978	T. Subbiah	BN (MIC)
5th	N06	1978 – 1982	T. Subbiah	BN (MIC)
6th	N06	1982 – 1986	T. Subbiah	BN (MIC)
Constituency abolished, split to Prai and Mak Mandin
Constituency re-created from Perai and Bagan Jermal
11th	N09	2004 – 2008	Subbaiyah Palaniappan	BN (MIC)
12th	N09	2008 – 2013	Tanasekharan Autherapady	PR (DAP)
13th	N09	2013 – 2015	Tanasekharan Autherapady	PR (DAP)
13th	N09	2015 – 2018	Tanasekharan Autherapady	PH (DAP)
14th	N09	2018 – 2023	Satees Muniandy	PH (DAP)
15th	N09	2023–present	Kumaran Krishnan	PH (DAP)

== Election results ==
Penang state election, 2023
Party	Candidate	Votes	%	∆%
PH	Kumaran Krishnan	10,506	71.49	▼1.01
PN	Jayaraman Kunchu Kannu	2,964	20.17	▲20.17
Independent	Satees Muniandy	1,111	7.56	▲7.56
Penang Front Party	S. Rajasakanan	115	0.78	▲0.48
Total valid votes		14,696	100.00	
Total rejected ballots		148		
Unreturned ballots		24		
Turnout		14,868	70.06	▼11.64
Registered electors		21,221		
Majority		7,542	51.32	▲5.42
PH hold		Swing		

Penang state election, 2018
Party	Candidate	Votes	%	∆%
PKR	Satees Muniandy	10,701	72.50	▲72.50
BN	Dhinagaran Jayabalan	3,918	26.60	▼6.40
BERSAMA	Teoh Uat Lye	51	0.30	▲0.30
Parti Rakyat Malaysia	Teoh Huck Ping	45	0.30	▲0.30
Penang Front Party	Jasper Ooi Zong Han	36	0.30	▲0.30
Total valid votes		14,751	100.00	
Total rejected ballots		164		
Unreturned ballots		33		
Turnout		14,948	81.70	▼2.60
Registered electors		18,291		
Majority		6,783	45.90	▲12.50
PKR hold		Swing		
Source(s) "His Majesty's Government Gazette - Notice of Contested Election, State Legislative Assembly for the State of Penang [P.U. (B) 252/2018]" (PDF). Attorney General's Chambers of Malaysia. 3 May 2018. "Federal Government Gazette - Results of Contested Election and Statements of the Poll after the Official Addition of Votes, State Constituencies for the State of Penang [P.U. (B) 326/2018]" (PDF). Attorney General's Chambers of Malaysia. 28 May 2018. Archived from the original (PDF) on 29 August 2019.

Penang state election, 2013
Party	Candidate	Votes	%	∆%
DAP	Tanasekharan Autherapady	10,253	66.40	▲4.50
BN	Karuppanan Malairaja	5,092	33.00	▼5.10
Love Malaysia Party	Lim Seang Teik	76	0.50	▲0.50
Independent	Asoghan Govindaraju	25	0.10	▲0.10
Total valid votes		15,446	100.00	
Total rejected ballots		241		
Unreturned ballots		0		
Turnout		15,687	84.30	▲11.30
Registered electors		18,613		
Majority		5,161	33.40	▲9.60
DAP hold		Swing		
Source(s) "Federal Government Gazette - Notice of Contested Election, State Legislative Assembly for the State of Penang [P.U. (B) 189/2013]" (PDF). Attorney General's Chambers of Malaysia. 26 April 2013. "Federal Government Gazette - Results of Contested Election and Statements of the Poll after the Official Addition of Votes, State Constituencies for the State of Penang [P.U. (B) 230/2013]" (PDF). Attorney General's Chambers of Malaysia. 22 May 2013. Archived from the original (PDF) on 22 March 2019.

Penang state election, 2008
Party	Candidate	Votes	%	∆%
DAP	Tanasekharan Autherapady	7,601	61.90	▲23.10
BN	Subbaiyah Palaniappan	4,669	38.10	▼16.87
Total valid votes		12,270	100.00	
Total rejected ballots		274		
Unreturned ballots		2		
Turnout		12,546	73.00	▲0.92
Registered electors		17,194		
Majority		2,932	23.80	▲7.63
DAP gain		Swing		

Penang state election, 2004
Party	Candidate	Votes	%	∆%
BN	Subbaiyah Palaniappan	6,687	54.97	▲7.63
DAP	Lim Hock Seng	4,720	38.80	▲8.42
PKR	Abdul Razak Abdul Hamid	758	6.23	▲6.23
Total valid votes		12,165	100.00	
Total rejected ballots		250		
Unreturned ballots		5		
Turnout		12,420	72.08	▼3.19
Registered electors		17,230		
Majority		1,967	16.17	▼0.79
BN hold		Swing		

Penang state election, 1982
Party	Candidate	Votes	%	∆%
BN	T. Subbiah	7,199	47.34	▲3.58
DAP	Raja Gopal Ramaya	4,620	30.38	▼12.90
Independent	Loong Kok Khoon	2,832	18.62	▲18.62
SDP	Yip Chim Guan	401	2.64	▼3.89
Independent	V. Apaoo Veeriayah	93	0.62	▲0.62
Independent	Sathasivam Swaminathan	62	0.41	▲0.41
Total valid votes		15,207	100.00	
Total rejected ballots		342		
Unreturned ballots		0		
Turnout		15,549	75.27	▼4.28
Registered electors		20,658		
Majority		2,597	16.96	▲16.48
BN hold		Swing		

Penang state election, 1978
Party	Candidate	Votes	%	∆%
BN	T. Subbiah	5,747	43.76	▼5.43
DAP	N. Shanmugam	5,684	43.28	▲11.70
SDP	Loh Kim Heng	857	6.53	▲6.53
PAS	Abdul Hamid Abdullah	845	6.43	▲6.43
Total valid votes		13,133	100.00	
Total rejected ballots		489		
Unreturned ballots		0		
Turnout		13,622	79.55	▼2.15
Registered electors		17,123		
Majority		63	0.48	▼17.13
BN hold		Swing		

Penang state election, 1974
Party	Candidate	Votes	%
BN	T. Subbiah	4,494	49.19
DAP	Peh Min Sin	2,885	31.58
PEKEMAS	S.K. Kalan Giyam	1,474	16.13
Parti Sosialis Rakyat Malaysia	Choo Guan Teik	219	2.40
Kesatuan Insaf Tanah Air	V. Aparco Veenayah	64	0.70
Total valid votes		9,136	100.00
Total rejected ballots		435	
Unreturned ballots		0	
Turnout		9,571	81.70
Registered electors		11,761	
Majority		1,609	17.61
This was a new constituency created.

== See also ==
- Constituencies of Penang
