= Kasthuriraani Patto =

Malaysian politician

- கஸ்தூரி பட்டு
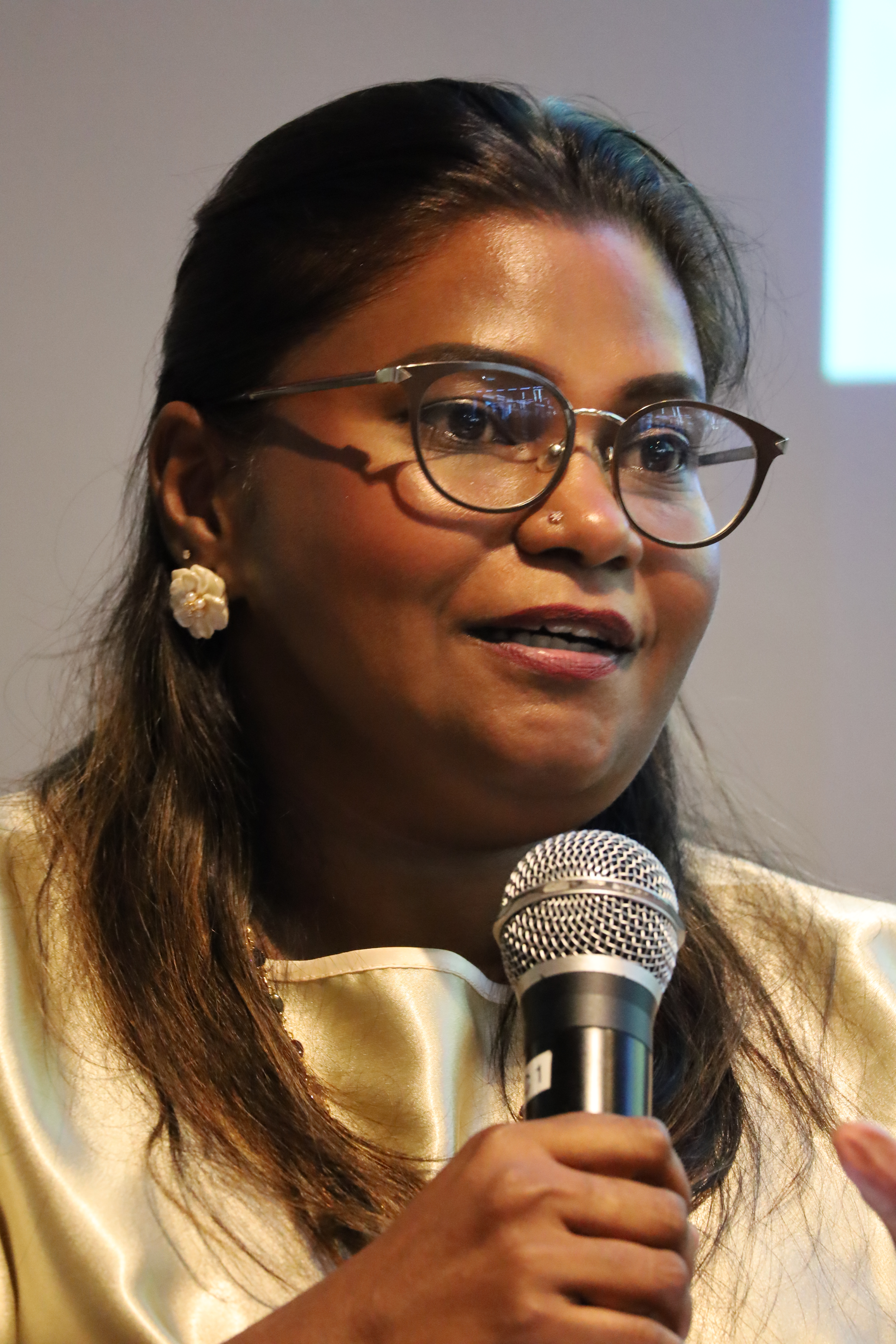

International Secretary of the Democratic Action Party
- Incumbent
- Assumed office 16 March 2025
- Assistant: Alice Lau Kiong Yieng
- Secretary-General: Anthony Loke Siew Fook
- Preceded by: Jannie Lasimbang

Assistant International Secretary of the Democratic Action Party
- In office 20 March 2022 – 16 March 2025
- Secretary-General: Anthony Loke Siew Fook
- International Secretary: Jannie Lasimbang
- Succeeded by: Alice Lau Kiong Yieng

Member of the Malaysian Parliament for Batu Kawan
- In office 5 May 2013 – 19 November 2022
- Preceded by: Ramasamy Palanisamy (PR–DAP)
- Succeeded by: Chow Kon Yeow (PH–DAP)
- Majority: 25,962 (2013); 33,553 (2018)

Faction represented in Dewan Rakyat
- 2013–2018: Democratic Action Party
- 2018–2022: Pakatan Harapan

Personal details
- Born: Kasthuriraani d/o Patto; 9 August 1979 (age 47) Ipoh, Perak, Malaysia
- Citizenship: Malaysian
- Party: Democratic Action Party (DAP)
- Other political affiliations: Pakatan Rakyat (PR) (2008–2015); Pakatan Harapan (PH) (since 2015)
- Spouse: Alain Morvan (m. 2022)
- Relations: P. Patto (father)

Kasthuriraani d/o Patto (Tamil: கஸ்தூரி பட்டு, romanized: Kastūri paṭṭu; born 9 August 1979) is a Malaysian politician who served as the Member of Parliament (MP) for Batu Kawan from May 2013 to November 2022. She is a member of the Democratic Action Party (DAP), a component party of the Pakatan Harapan (PH) and formerly Pakatan Rakyat (PR) coalitions. She has served as the International Secretary of DAP since March 2025. She served as the Assistant International Secretary of DAP from March 2022 to March 2025 and President of the Parliamentarians for Global Action (PGA) since December 2021 as well as Member of the Steering Group for the International Panel of Parliamentarians for the Freedom of Religion and Belief.

== Politics ==
In the 2013 general election, Kasthuriraani Patto was elected as MP for the Batu Kawan constituency. She was known for fighting for female rights in parliament, as a member of the parliamentary special select committee for human rights and gender equality. She was also a vocal advocate of death penalty abolition.

In the 2018 general election, she was reelected with a huge majority of 33,553 votes over her closest challenger. She won over 78 percent of the votes in a four-cornered fight with B. Jayanthi Devi of Barisan Nasional, Jay Kumar of PAS and Ooi Khar Giap of the Penang Front Party.

During her time in the Dewan Rakyat, she was involved in a number of public exchanges. In Nov 2019, she demanded that Tanjong Karang MP Noh Omar apologise to women for using profanities, saying that he lacked decorum and respect for the speaker, fellow MPs and women MPs.

Meanwhile in July 2020, Baling MP Abdul Azeez Abdul Rahim was forced to apologise after he had said that Kasthuri was “dark” and could not be seen. He also asked her to “put on some powder”. Kasthuri called his comments sexist and racist.

In July 2022, she hit out at Dewan Rakyat deputy speaker Mohd Rashid Hasnon for not to reprimanding Umno MP Tajuddin Abdul Rahman who allegedly uttered profanities in the lower house, warning that it set a dangerous precedent, when Rashid ejected her over her complaint but allowed Tajuddin to remain.

In Nov 2022, Kasthuri announced that she had decided not to defend her parliamentary seat and was succeeded by Chow Kon Yeow, the Chief Minister of Penang.

== Personal life ==
Kasthuriraani is the daughter of the late politician Patto Perumal (better known as P. Patto) and Mary Patto. Her late father was a senior DAP politician who served as MP for Menglembu (1978-82), Ipoh (1986-90) and Bagan (1995), as well as Gopeng and Sungai Pari assemblyman. He was also detained twice under the Internal Security Act (ISA) in 1978 and during Operasi Lalang in 1987.

She has one sister named Shaalini Anne Patto. Kasthuri married French citizen Alain Morvan on 6 May 2022.

== Election results ==
Parliament of Malaysia
Year	Constituency	Candidate	Votes	Pct	Opponent(s)	Votes	Pct	Ballots cast	Majority	Turnout
2013	P046 Batu Kawan	Kasthuriraani Patto (DAP)	36,636	72.97%	Gobalakrishnan Narayanasamy (MIC)	10,674	21.26%	50,208	25,962	87.32%
2013	P046 Batu Kawan	Kasthuriraani Patto (DAP)	36,636	72.97%	Huan Cheng Guan (PCM)	1,801	3.59%	50,208	25,962	87.32%
2013	P046 Batu Kawan	Kasthuriraani Patto (DAP)	36,636	72.97%	Mohan Apparoo (IND)	305	0.61%	50,208	25,962	87.32%
2018	P046 Batu Kawan	Kasthuriraani Patto (DAP)	42,683	78.02%	Jayanthi Devi Balaguru (Gerakan)	9,130	16.69%	55,479	33,553	84.84%
2018	P046 Batu Kawan	Kasthuriraani Patto (DAP)	42,683	78.02%	Jay Kumar Balakrishna (PAS)	2,636	4.82%	55,479	33,553	84.84%
2018	P046 Batu Kawan	Kasthuriraani Patto (DAP)	42,683	78.02%	Ooi Khar Giap (PFP)	256	0.47%	55,479	33,553	84.84%

== See also ==
- Batu Kawan (federal constituency)
