= Soon Lip Chee =

Malaysian politician

Yang Berbahagia Dato' Soon Lip Chee DSPN
- 孫意志 Sun Ì-chì; Syun1 Ji3 Zi3

Member of the Penang State Executive Council (Youth and Sports)
- In office 16 May 2018 – 13 August 2023
- Governor: Abdul Rahman Abbas (2018–2021); Ahmad Fuzi Abdul Razak (2021–2023)
- Chief Minister: Chow Kon Yeow
- Preceded by: Chong Eng
- Succeeded by: Daniel Gooi Zi Sen
- Constituency: Bagan Jermal

Member of the Penang State Legislative Assembly for Bagan Jermal
- In office 9 May 2018 – 12 August 2023
- Preceded by: Lim Hock Seng (PR–DAP)
- Succeeded by: Chee Yeeh Keen (PH–DAP)
- Majority: 15,236 (2018)

Member of the Penang State Legislative Assembly for Jawi
- In office 5 May 2013 – 9 May 2018
- Preceded by: Tan Beng Huat (PR–DAP)
- Succeeded by: Jason H'ng Mooi Lye (PH–DAP)
- Majority: 9,076 (2013)

Personal details
- Born: Soon Lip Chee; 16 June 1977 (age 48) Penang, Malaysia
- Citizenship: Malaysian
- Party: Democratic Action Party (DAP)
- Other political affiliations: Pakatan Rakyat (PR) (2008–2015); Pakatan Harapan (PH) (since 2015)
- Occupation: Politician

Soon Lip Chee (born 16 June 1977) is a Malaysian politician who served as Member of the Penang State Executive Council (EXCO) in the Pakatan Harapan (PH) state administration under Chief Minister Chow Kon Yeow from May 2018 to August 2023 and Member of the Penang State Legislative Assembly for Bagan Jermal from May 2018 to August 2023 and Jawi from May 2013 to May 2018. He is a member of the Democratic Action Party (DAP), a component party of the PH and Pakatan Rakyat (PR) coalitions.

== Election results ==
Penang State Legislative Assembly
Year	Constituency	Candidate	Votes	Pct	Opponent(s)	Votes	Pct	Ballots cast	Majority	Turnout
2013	N19 Jawi	Soon Lip Chee (DAP)	15,219	71.20%	Tan Cheng Liang (MCA)	6,143	28.80%	21,701	9,076	87.70%
2018	N08 Bagan Jermal	Soon Lip Chee (DAP)	18,134	85.37%	Ang Chor Keong (MCA)	2,898	13.64%	21,459	15,236	83.80%
2018	N08 Bagan Jermal	Soon Lip Chee (DAP)	18,134	85.37%	Hari Devyndran Muniswaran (MUP)	106	0.50%	21,459	15,236	83.80%
2018	N08 Bagan Jermal	Soon Lip Chee (DAP)	18,134	85.37%	Teoh Chai Deng (PRM)	74	0.35%	21,459	15,236	83.80%
2018	N08 Bagan Jermal	Soon Lip Chee (DAP)	18,134	85.37%	Fabian George Albart (PFP)	30	0.14%	21,459	15,236	83.80%

== Honours ==
- Penang
  - Officer of the Order of the Defender of State (DSPN) – Dato' (2023)
