= Jason H'ng Mooi Lye =

Malaysian politician

Yang Berhormat Tuan Jason H'ng Mooi Lye MLA
- 方美铼

Member of the Penang State Executive Council
- Incumbent
- Assumed office 16 August 2023
- Governor: Ahmad Fuzi Abdul Razak (2023–2025); Ramli Ngah Talib (since 2025)
- Chief Minister: Chow Kon Yeow
- Portfolio: Local Government, Town and Country Planning
- Preceded by: Jagdeep Singh Deo
- Constituency: Jawi

Member of the Penang State Legislative Assembly for Jawi
- Incumbent
- Assumed office 9 May 2018
- Preceded by: Soon Lip Chee (PR–DAP)
- Majority: 13,371 (2018); 15,319 (2023)

Personal details
- Born: Jason H'ng Mooi Lye; 23 June 1978 (age 48) Sungai Bakap, Penang, Malaysia
- Citizenship: Malaysian
- Party: Democratic Action Party (DAP) (since 2012)
- Other political affiliations: Pakatan Rakyat (PR) (2012–2015); Pakatan Harapan (PH) (since 2015)
- Education: University of Southern Queensland
- Occupation: Politician

Jason H'ng Mooi Lye (born 23 June 1978) is a Malaysian politician who has served as Member of the Penang State Executive Council (EXCO) in the Pakatan Harapan (PH) state administration under Chief Minister Chow Kon Yeow since August 2023 and Member of Penang State Legislative Assembly (MLA) for Jawi since May 2018. He is a member, State Organising Secretary of Penang and Division Chief of Nibong Tebal of the Democratic Action Party (DAP), a component party of the PH coalition.

== Education ==
H'ng studied in SJK(C) Chong Kuang and SM Valdor. He has a Bachelor of Information Technology from the University of Southern Queensland.

== Political career ==
H'ng joined DAP in 2012. He was the Publicity Secretary for DAP Sungai Duri branch from 2013 to 2014 and Secretary for DAP Nibong Tebal division from 2013 to 2015. He was also a member of Seberang Perai City Council from 2013 to 2018, and was the Chief Whip of Seberang Perai City Council from 2017 to 2018. He is currently the Organising Secretary for DAP Penang and the Chairman of DAP Nibong Tebal division.

== Election results ==
Penang State Legislative Assembly
Year	Constituency	Candidate	Votes	Pct.	Opponent(s)	Votes	Pct.	Ballots cast	Majority	Turnout
2018	N19 Jawi	Jason H'ng Mooi Lye (DAP)	17,559	78.58%	Kiew Hen Chong (Gerakan)	4,188	18.74%	22,778	13,371	85.30%
2018	N19 Jawi	Jason H'ng Mooi Lye (DAP)	17,559	78.58%	Tan Beng Huat (PAP)	309	1.38%	22,778	13,371	85.30%
2018	N19 Jawi	Jason H'ng Mooi Lye (DAP)	17,559	78.58%	Koay Xing Boon (MUP)	165	0.74%	22,778	13,371	85.30%
2018	N19 Jawi	Jason H'ng Mooi Lye (DAP)	17,559	78.58%	Daphne Edward (PFP)	73	0.33%	22,778	13,371	85.30%
2018	N19 Jawi	Jason H'ng Mooi Lye (DAP)	17,559	78.58%	Tan Chew Suan (PRM)	51	0.23%	22,778	13,371	85.30%
2023	N19 Jawi	Jason H'ng Mooi Lye (DAP)	20,641	79.50%	Steven Koh Tien Yew (PAS)	5,322	20.50%	26,284	15,319	71.81%
