= Ramasamy Palanisamy =

Malaysian politician

Professor Dr. Ramasamy Palanisamy இராமசாமி பழனிசாமி
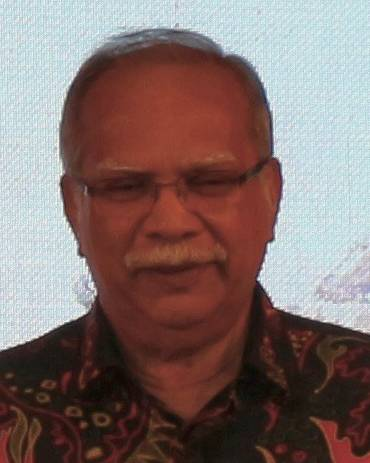

Deputy Chief Minister of Penang II
- In office 13 March 2008 – 13 August 2023 Serving with Mohd Firdaus Khairuddin (2008–2009) & Mansor Othman (2009–2013) & Mohd Rashid Hasnon (2013–2018) & Ahmad Zakiyuddin Abdul Rahman (2018–2023) (Deputy Chief Ministers of Penang I)
- Governor: Abdul Rahman Abbas (2008–2021); Ahmad Fuzi Abdul Razak (2021–2023)
- Chief Minister: Lim Guan Eng (2008–2018); Chow Kon Yeow (2018–2023)
- Preceded by: Abdul Rashid Abdullah
- Succeeded by: Jagdeep Singh Deo
- Constituency: Perai

Member of the Penang State Executive Council (State Economic Planning, Education, Human Resources, Science, Technology and Innovation)
- In office 13 March 2008 – 13 August 2023
- Governor: Abdul Rahman Abbas (2008–2021); Ahmad Fuzi Abdul Razak (2021–2023)
- Chief Minister: Lim Guan Eng (2008–2018); Chow Kon Yeow (2018–2023)
- Preceded by: Toh Kin Woon
- Constituency: Perai

Member of the Malaysian Parliament for Batu Kawan
- In office 8 March 2008 – 5 May 2013
- Preceded by: Huan Cheng Guan (BN–GERAKAN)
- Succeeded by: Kasthuriraani Patto (PR–DAP)
- Majority: 9,485 (2008)

Member of the Penang State Legislative Assembly for Perai
- In office 8 March 2008 – 12 August 2023
- Preceded by: Rajapathy Kuppusamy (BN–MIC)
- Succeeded by: Sundarajoo Somu (PH–DAP)
- Majority: 5,176 (2008); 7,159 (2013); 9,049 (2018)

Personal details
- Born: P. Ramasamy s/o Palanisamy; 10 May 1949 (age 77) Sitiawan, Perak, Federation of Malaya (now Malaysia)
- Citizenship: Malaysian
- Party: Democratic Action Party (DAP) (2005–2023); United for the Rights of Malaysians Party (URIMAI) (since 2023)
- Other political affiliations: Pakatan Rakyat (PR) (2008–2015); Pakatan Harapan (PH) (2015–2023)
- Education: Indiana University Bloomington; McGill University; University of Malaya
- Occupation: Politician
- Website: www.pramasamy.com

Professor Dr. P. Ramasamy s/o Palanisamy (Tamil: இராமசாமி பழனிசாமி; born 10 May 1949) is a Malaysian politician who served as the Deputy Chief Minister of Penang II and Member of the Penang State Executive Council (EXCO) in the Pakatan Rakyat (PR) and Pakatan Harapan (PH) state administrations under Chief Ministers Lim Guan Eng and Chow Kon Yeow and Member of the Penang State Legislative Assembly (MLA) for Perai from March 2008 to August 2023. He also served as the Member of Parliament (MP) for Batu Kawan from March 2008 to May 2013. He is a member of the United for the Rights of Malaysians Party (URIMAI). He has served as the founding Chairman of URIMAI since September 2023. He was a member of the Democratic Action Party (DAP), a component party of the PH and formerly PR coalitions. His vocal opinions on Zakir Naik, support for the Hindu Nationalism policies in India under Narendra Modi regime and call for reforms of the civil service in Malaysia due to its Malay dominance have been controversial.

Ramasamy was elected to the Malaysian Parliament and Penang State Legislative Assembly in the 2008 election, defeating former Penang Chief Minister Koh Tsu Koon. He became Deputy Chief Minister of Penang after the election, serving under the new Chief Minister Lim Guan Eng, making him the first person of Indian origin to hold the post of deputy chief minister in any Malaysian state.

In 2023, Ramasamy left DAP over dissatisfaction of not being nominated by the party to contest in the Penang state election and differences with party leaders and founded the Indian-focused URIMAI.

Before entering politics, Ramasamy was a professor at the Universiti Kebangsaan Malaysia (UKM), from which he officially retired in May 2005. He later took up teaching positions in Germany and Singapore.

== Early life and education ==
Ramasamy was born on 10 May 1949. His father Palaniyammal Palanichany and his mother worked in the fields of Malaya in 1920 and migrated from Tamil Nadu. He has six siblings. Ramasamy attended the Anglo-China Primary School in the late 1950s.

He earned his early education in Teluk Intan, Perak, then obtained a First Degree in Journalism in New Zealand. He received a bachelor of arts in Political Science at Indian University Bloomington, United States in 1977, a master's degree in Political Science at McGill University, Canada in 1980, and a PhD in Political Science/Public Administration at University of Malaya in 1991. He served as a lecturer from 1981 to 2005 at Universiti Kebangsaan Malaysia in Political Science.

== Career ==
He has served as the University of Singapore's Visiting Professor in Southeast Asian Political Education. From the beginning, he has been involved as an activist working on issues of labor beginning in the 1980s through INSAN (Institute of Social Analysis) Kuala Lumpur.

He has had 25 years of experience as a political science lecturer, who has served as a counselor and security consultant to several international peace efforts such as Acheh, Sri Lanka, the Philippines and Colombia. Ramasamy served as an advisor to the Global Labor University International Labour Organization (ILO) 2004.

== Political career ==
Ramasamy is active as an activist who fights for the fate of minorities in Sri Lanka and Acheh Merdeka. The two parties involved in Acheh finally agreed to sign a peace agreement on 5 August 2005. On 26 August 2005, he was fired from Universiti Kebangsaan Malaysia (UKM) for no reason. Afterwards he taught in Germany and Singapore and began to engage in Democratic Action Party (DAP) activities.

Started joining DAP officially in September 2005. Writing several books and many articles in local and international journals. He defeated former Chief Minister of Penang Tan Sri Koh Tsu Koon for the Batu Kawan parliamentary constituency in the 2008 general election. He was also Penang State Assemblyman N16 Perai. In 2008, the Barisan Nasional (BN) government fell to Pakatan Rakyat (PR) as DAP had won 19 seats, People's Justice Party (PKR) 9 seats and Malaysian Islamic Party (PAS) only 1 seat. He was appointed Deputy Chief Minister II of Penang and was the first Indian to be elected to the post.

In the exco of the Penang government, he was responsible for state economic planning, education and human resources, science, technology and innovation.

After being dropped as candidate to defend his Perai seat for the 2023 Penang state election, Ramasamy quit DAP on 10 August 2023, citing the actions of certain party leaders as the reason of his party resignation.

== Controversies ==
=== Zakir Naik ===
On 10 April 2016, P Ramasamy, called prominent Islamic preacher Dr. Zakir Naik as "satan", he wrote in his Facebook post "Let us get ‘satan’ Zakir Naik out of this country!".

On 2 November 2023, the High Court has ordered P Ramasamy to pay RM 1.5 Million in libel to Zakir Naik as the judgement for the same case.

=== India's Hindu Nationalism policies under Narendra Modi ===
During October 2019, on the internationally objected event of the military lockdown of Kashmir (region in India known for military excesses) during Jammu and Kashmir reorganization, P Ramasamy criticized the then Malaysian Prime Minister Mahathir for expressing his concern at the United Nations to restore the human rights situation in Kashmir. On the one year anniversary of Kashmir's special status revocation, Mahathir stated that as he was no longer the premier, he could "speak without restrain and address the Kashmir issue", noting the backlash his previous statements had caused; Offering no apology for his criticism, Mahathir added that "keeping quiet is not an option when all the telltale signs were pointing towards another situation whereby a big and powerful country imposed its will with impunity on a small and defenseless nation."

During December 2019, despite global condemnation by many leaders and human rights organizations on India's Citizenship Amendment Act (designed for addressing the bordering Muslim majority countries only), the detention camp deaths due to NRC and the deaths during the protests against the Act; P Ramasamy had a series of articles defending the requirement of the Act and had TV appearances in Indian media criticizing Mahathir for commenting on the India's Citizenship Amendment Act and the deaths caused (during protests and in detention camp for lack of ancestral documents). Hafiz Hassan, had questioned "Is P Ramasamy a state assembly person from Malaysia or an official from India's External Affairs Ministry?" on why he is so apologetic of the citizenship policy of India, despite Sri Lankan Tamil refugees in India would be affected as well.

== Election results ==
Parliament of Malaysia
Year	Constituency	Candidate	Votes	Pct	Opponent(s)	Votes	Pct	Ballots cast	Majority	Turnout
2008	P046 Batu Kawan	Ramasamy Palanisamy (DAP)	23,067	62.94%	Koh Tsu Koon (GERAKAN)	13,582	37.06%	37,292	9,485	78.71%

Penang State Legislative Assembly
Year	Constituency	Candidate	Votes	Pct	Opponent(s)	Votes	Pct	Ballots cast	Majority	Turnout
2008	N16 Perai	Ramasamy Palanisamy (DAP)	7,668	71.99%	Krishnan Letchumanan (MIC)	2,590	24.32%	10,651	5,176	75.14%
2008	N16 Perai	Ramasamy Palanisamy (DAP)	7,668	71.99%	Ulaganathan a/l KAP Ramasamy (IND)	311	2.92%	10,651	5,176	75.14%
2013	N16 Perai	Ramasamy Palanisamy (DAP)	10,549	78.29%	Krishnan Letchumanan (MIC)	2,590	19.22%	13,474	7,959	83.90%
2013	N16 Perai	Ramasamy Palanisamy (DAP)	10,549	78.29%	Muhammad Ridhwan Sulaiman (IND)	184	1.37%	13,474	7,959	83.90%
2018	N16 Perai	Ramasamy Palanisamy (DAP)	11,243	82.50%	Suresh Muniandy (MIC)	2,194	16.10%	13,819	9,049	81.10%
2018	N16 Perai	Ramasamy Palanisamy (DAP)	11,243	82.50%	Patrick Ooi Khar Giap (PFP)	104	0.80%	13,819	9,049	81.10%
2018	N16 Perai	Ramasamy Palanisamy (DAP)	11,243	82.50%	Samuganathan Muniandy (PRM)	37	0.20%	13,819	9,049	81.10%
2018	N16 Perai	Ramasamy Palanisamy (DAP)	11,243	82.50%	Asoghan Govindaraju (PAP)	33	0.20%	13,819	9,049	81.10%
2018	N16 Perai	Ramasamy Palanisamy (DAP)	11,243	82.50%	Kumary Retnam (IND)	23	0.20%	13,819	9,049	81.10%
