= Mak Mandin (state constituency) =

Malaysian defunct state constituency

Penang constituency

Defunct state constituency
- Legislature: Penang State Legislative Assembly
- Constituency created: 1986
- Constituency abolished: 1995
- First contested: 1986
- Last contested: 1990

Mak Mandin is a state constituency in Penang, Malaysia that has been represented in the Penang State Legislative Assembly from 1986 until 1995.

The state constituency was created in the 1986 and is mandated to return a single member to the Penang State Legislative Assembly under the first past the post voting system.

== History ==
It was abolished in 1995 when it was redistributed.

=== Representation history ===
Members of the Legislative Assembly for Mak Mandin
Assembly	No	Years	Member	Party
Constituency created from Bagan Jermal
7th	N08	1986–1990	Sak Cheng Lum (石清霖)	BN (MCA)
8th	N08	1990–1995	Lim Hock Seng (林峰成)	GR (DAP)
Constituency abolished, split to Bagan Jermal

== Election results ==
Penang state election, 1990
Party	Candidate	Votes	%	∆%
DAP	Lim Hock Seng	7,365	50.37	▲8.15
BN	Michael Chen	7,256	49.63	▼4.30
Total valid votes		14,621	100.00	
Total rejected ballots		298		
Unreturned ballots		0		
Turnout		14,919	75.45	▲2.65
Registered electors		19,833		
Majority		109	0.74	▼10.97
DAP gain from BN		Swing		?

Penang state election, 1986
Party	Candidate	Votes	%
BN	Sak Cheng Lum	7,567	53.93
DAP	Ali Kassim	5,925	42.22
SDP	Lim Swee Hock	540	3.85
Total valid votes		14,032	100.00
Total rejected ballots		357	
Unreturned ballots		0	
Turnout		14,389	72.80
Registered electors		19,764	
Majority		1,642	11.71
This was a new constituency created.
