= P. Patto =

Malaysian politician

Member of the Malaysian Parliament for Bagan
- In office 25 April 1995 – 12 July 1995
- Preceded by: Lim Hock Seng (DAP)
- Succeeded by: Lim Hock Seng (GR–DAP)
- Majority: 118 (1995)

Personal details
- Born: Patto a/l Perumal; 19 December 1946 Bagan Serai, Perak, Malayan Union (now Malaysia)
- Died: 12 July 1995 (aged 48) Hospital Raja Permaisuri Bainun, Ipoh, Perak, Malaysia
- Cause of death: Heart attack
- Party: Democratic Action Party (DAP) (1971–1995)
- Other political affiliations: Gagasan Rakyat (GR) (1990–1995)
- Spouse: Mary Kaur
- Children: Kasthuriraani Patto
- Occupation: Politician

Patto s/o Perumal (Tamil: பட்டோ பெருமாள், romanized: Paṭṭō perumāḷ; 19 December 1946 – 12 July 1995) also known as P. Patto was a Malaysian politician and political detainee. A member of the Democratic Action Party, he served as a member of parliament in three separate spells.

He was detained without trial as part of the Operation Lalang arrests, which was carried out by the Mahathir Mohamad government in 1987. He died in 1995, shortly after being elected Bagan MP. His daughter Kasthuriraani Patto is also a politician who was Batu Kawan MP from 2013 to 2022.

== Early life ==
Patto was born in Bagan Serai, Perak on 19 December 1946. He was raised by his grandfather as his father died when he was just ten. A trained teacher, he was able to converse in Malay, English, Tamil and broken Cantonese.

== Political career ==
He joined the DAP in 1971 and eventually quit teaching to take up the role of political secretary to DAP leader Lim Kit Siang in 1973. The next year he challenged MIC heavyweight Samy Vellu in Sungai Siput, losing by a surprisingly small margin of 644 votes. However, he won the Gopeng seat in the Perak state assembly.

Patto also became DAP deputy secretary general and editor of the party newspaper The Rocket.

In 1978, he and Lim Kit Siang were arrested under the ISA after they exposed the scandal of the purchase of four Swedish-made SPICA-M fast strike crafts by the Royal Malaysian Navy. The same year he was elected Menglembu MP, securing 29,573 votes to defeat Barisan Nasional candidate Lee Can Fai by 12,770 votes. He also retained the Gopeng seat.

Patto was left without a seat after the 1982 elections where he lost in Petaling, but returned in 1986 with a double victory in the Ipoh parliamentary election and the Sungai Pari state assembly seat. In the race for Ipoh he bagged 21,401 votes winning by a majority of 5654 over Wong Chin Chye of Barisan Nasional while Chan Kok Keong of the Socialist Democratic Party came a distant third.

In 1987, he was detained at the Kamunting Detention Camp under the Malaysian Internal Security Act during Operation Lalang. The operation saw the arrest of at least 106 people—political activists, opposition politicians, intellectuals, students, artists, scientists and others—who were detained without trial. Other DAP leaders who were also arrested were Lim Kit Siang, Karpal Singh, Lim Guan Eng, Tan Seng Giaw, V. David, Lau Dak Kee and Hu Sepang. He was released in 1989.

In the 1990 election, Patto went up against MIC President Samy Vellu in the Sungai Siput parliamentary seat again. Samy got 14,427 votes while Patto got 12,664 votes

In 1995, he returned to parliament by winning the Bagan seat with a very narrow majority of just 118 votes. He captured 26,524 votes while his opponent Yeoh Khoon Chooi polled 26,406 votes.

== Death ==
Within three months of the election, he died at the age of 48 at Raja Permaisuri Bainun Hospital on 12 July 1995, due to a heart attack. He left behind his wife Mary and two daughters Kasthuriraani and Shaalini Anne.

His book Nenjukku Neethi (Justice from My Heart) was published in 2008 in conjunction with the 13th anniversary of his death.

In October 2008, Menteri Besar of Perak Mohammad Nizar Jamaluddin backed a plan to rename Jalan Selibin in Ipoh to Jalan P. Patto, but after objections from various parties, the plan was cancelled.

It was then proposed to give his name to a major road in Butterworth, Seberang Perai. Jalan P. Patto was completed and officially opened by the then Chief Minister of Penang Lim Guan Eng, on 31 July 2011.

== Election results ==
Parliament of Malaysia
Year	Constituency	Candidate	Votes	Pct	Opponent(s)	Votes	Pct	Ballots cast	Majority	Turnout
1974	P048 Sungei Siput	Patto Perumal (DAP)	8,401	45.59%	Samy Vellu (MIC)	9,045	49.09%	18,529	644	77.87%
1974	P048 Sungei Siput	Patto Perumal (DAP)	8,401	45.59%	Thang Pang Fay (PEKEMAS)	877	4.76%	18,529	644	77.87%
1974	P048 Sungei Siput	Patto Perumal (DAP)	8,401	45.59%	RC Manavarayan (IND)	103	0.56%	18,529	644	77.87%
1978	P055 Menglembu	Patto Perumal (DAP)	29,573	63.77%	Lee Chan Fai (MCA)	16,803	36.23%	47,912	12,770	77.98%
1982	P081 Petaling	Patto Perumal (DAP)	37,436	46.71%	Yeoh Poh San (MCA)	42,710	53.29%	81,946	5,274	71.44%
1986	P059 Ipoh	Patto Perumal (DAP)	21,401	56.25%	Wong Chin Chye (MCA)	15,747	41.39%	38,742	5,654	66.28%
1986	P059 Ipoh	Patto Perumal (DAP)	21,401	56.25%	Chan Kok Keong (SDP)	900	2.37%	38,742	5,654	66.28%
1990	P056 Sungai Siput	Patto Perumal (DAP)	12,664	46.75%	Samy Vellu (MIC)	14,427	53.25%	28,028	1,763	69.21%
1995	P043 Bagan	Patto Perumal (DAP)	26,524	50.11%	Yeoh Khoon Chooi (MCA)	26,406	49.89%	54,378	118	76.89%

Perak State Legislative Assembly
Year	Constituency	Candidate	Votes	Pct	Opponent(s)	Votes	Pct	Ballots cast	Majority	Turnout
1974	N20 Gopeng	Patto Perumal (DAP)	7,499	44.53%	S. R. Chandran (PPP)	6,681	39.67%	17,689	818	79.26%
1974	N20 Gopeng	Patto Perumal (DAP)	7,499	44.53%	Choy Chooi Yooi (IND)	1,428	8.48%	17,689	818	79.26%
1974	N20 Gopeng	Patto Perumal (DAP)	7,499	44.53%	Ibrahim Mohamed Yusof (IND)	650	3.86%	17,689	818	79.26%
1974	N20 Gopeng	Patto Perumal (DAP)	7,499	44.53%	Shaharuddin Dahalan (PEKEMAS)	582	3.46%	17,689	818	79.26%
1978	N20 Gopeng	Patto Perumal (DAP)								
1986	N22 Sungai Pari	Patto Perumal (DAP)	10,700	55.62%	Lee Chan Sai	8,139	42.31%	19,575	2,561	67.26%
1986	N22 Sungai Pari	Patto Perumal (DAP)	10,700	55.62%	Au You Heng (SDP)	398	2.07%	19,575	2,561	67.26%

Penang State Legislative Assembly
Year	Constituency	Candidate	Votes	Pct	Opponent(s)	Votes	Pct	Ballots cast	Majority	Turnout
1995	N09 Perai	Patto Perumal (DAP)	7,357	45.85%	Rajapathy Kuppusamy (MIC)	9,047	55.15%	16,849	1,690	72.86%
