= Sundarajoo Somu =

Malaysian politician

Yang Berhormat Dato' Seri Sundarajoo Somu DGPN DMPN DSPN PKT MLA
- சுந்தரராஜூ சோமு

Member of the Penang State Executive Council
- Incumbent
- Assumed office 16 August 2023
- Governor: Ahmad Fuzi Abdul Razak (2023–2025); Ramli Ngah Talib (since 2025)
- Chief Minister: Chow Kon Yeow
- Portfolio: Housing and Environment
- Preceded by: Jagdeep Singh Deo (Housing); Phee Boon Poh (Environment)
- Constituency: Perai

Member of the Penang State Legislative Assembly for Perai
- Incumbent
- Assumed office 12 August 2023
- Preceded by: Ramasamy Palanisamy (PH–DAP)
- Majority: 9,139 (2023)

Personal details
- Born: Sundarajoo a/l Somu; 23 May 1962 (age 64) Brickfields, Kuala Lumpur, Selangor, Federation of Malaya (now Malaysia)
- Citizenship: Malaysian
- Party: Democratic Action Party (DAP) (since 2018)
- Other political affiliations: Pakatan Harapan (PH) (since 2018)
- Children: 4
- Education: Nottingham Trent University
- Occupation: Politician

Sundarajoo a/l Somu (born 23 May 1962) is a Malaysian politician who has served as Member of the Penang State Executive Council (EXCO) in the Pakatan Harapan (PH) state administration under Chief Minister Chow Kon Yeow and Member of the Penang State Legislative Assembly (MLA) for Perai since August 2023. He is a member of the Democratic Action Party (DAP), a component party of the PH coalition.

== Early life ==
Sundarajoo was born into a poor family in Brickfields, Kuala Lumpur.

== Education ==
Sundarajoo earned his diploma from the Federal Institute of Technology. He received his Master in Business Administration from Nottingham Trent University.

== Early career ==
Sundarajoo first worked as an adjuster for the General Insurance Association of Malaysia. He lost his job during the 1987 financial crisis and started working as a field conductor for an estate. Then, he started working as a taxi driver before becoming a security guard where Tan Sri Liew Kee Sin, the founder of S P Setia, lived. Subsequently, he worked as Liew's driver before joining S P Setia in 2005 as a salesman. In 2012, he was made the general manager of S P Setia for the northern region of Malaysia. In 2014, following Permodalan Nasional Berhad’s takeover of S P Setia, he helped Liew set up EcoWorld and became the Deputy Chairman and deputy CEO of EcoWorld.

== Political career ==
Sundarajoo joined DAP in 2018.

== Election results ==
Penang State Legislative Assembly
Year	Constituency	Candidate	Votes	Pct	Opponent(s)	Votes	Pct	Ballots cast	Majority	Turnout
2023	N16 Perai	Sundarajoo Somu (DAP)	10,680	76.76%	Sivasuntaram Rajalinggam (Gerakan)	1,541	11.08%	14,044	9,139	68.58%
2023	N16 Perai	Sundarajoo Somu (DAP)	10,680	76.76%	David Marshel Pakianathan (IND)	1,439	10.34%	14,044	9,139	68.58%
2023	N16 Perai	Sundarajoo Somu (DAP)	10,680	76.76%	Vikneswary Harikrishnan (MUDA)	253	1.82%	14,044	9,139	68.58%

== Honours ==
- Penang
  - Commander of the Order of the Defender of State (DGPN) – Dato' Seri (2020)
  - Companion of the Order of the Defender of State (DMPN) – Dato' (2016)
  - Officer of the Order of the Defender of State (DSPN) – Dato' (2011)
  - Recipient of the Distinguished Conduct Medal (PKT) (2009)
