= Satees Muniandy =

Malaysian politician

- சதீஸ் முனியாண்டி

Member of the Penang State Legislative Assembly for Bagan Dalam
- In office 9 May 2018 – 12 August 2023
- Preceded by: Tanasekharan Autherapady (PR–DAP)
- Succeeded by: Kumaran Krishnan (PH–DAP)
- Majority: 6,783 (2018)

Personal details
- Born: 28 March 1985 (age 41) Taiping, Perak
- Citizenship: Malaysian
- Party: Democratic Action Party (DAP) (–2023); Independent (IND) (since 2023)
- Other political affiliations: Pakatan Harapan (–2023)
- Occupation: Politician

Satees s/o Muniandy is a Malaysian politician. He served as Member of the Penang State Legislative Assembly for Bagan Dalam from May 2018 to August 2023.

His name was dropped in the 2023 Penang state election. Later he left DAP.

== Election results ==
Penang State Legislative Assembly
Year	Constituency	Candidate	Votes	Pct	Opponent(s)	Votes	Pct	Ballots cast	Majority	Turnout
2018	N09 Bagan Dalam	Satees Muniandy (DAP)	10,701	72.50%	Dhinagaran Jayabalan (MIC)	3,918	26.60%	14,948	6,783	81.70%
2018	N09 Bagan Dalam	Satees Muniandy (DAP)	10,701	72.50%	Teoh Uat Lye (MUP)	51	0.30%	14,948	6,783	81.70%
2018	N09 Bagan Dalam	Satees Muniandy (DAP)	10,701	72.50%	Teoh Huck Ping (PRM)	45	0.30%	14,948	6,783	81.70%
2018	N09 Bagan Dalam	Satees Muniandy (DAP)	10,701	72.50%	Jasper Ooi Zong Han (PFP)	36	0.30%	14,948	6,783	81.70%
2023	N09 Bagan Dalam	Satees Muniandy (IND)	1,111	7.56%	Kumaran Krishnan (DAP)	10,506	71.49%	14,868	7,542	70.06%
2023	N09 Bagan Dalam	Satees Muniandy (IND)	1,111	7.56%	Jayaraman Kunchu Kannu (PAS)	2,964	20.17%	14,868	7,542	70.06%
2023	N09 Bagan Dalam	Satees Muniandy (IND)	1,111	7.56%	S. Rajasakanan (PFP)	115	0.78%	14,868	7,542	70.06%
