= Tanasekharan Autherapady =

Malaysian politician

Yang Berbahagia Dato' Tanasekharan Autherapady DSPN
- தனசேகரன் ஆதரேபாடி

Member of the Penang State Legislative Assembly for Bagan Dalam
- In office 8 March 2008 – 9 May 2018
- Preceded by: Subbaiyah Palaniappan (BN–MIC)
- Succeeded by: Satees Muniandy (PH–DAP)
- Majority: 2,932 (2008); 5,161 (2013)

Personal details
- Born: Tanasekharan a/l Autherapady; 31 December 1955 (age 70) Kuala Kurau, Perak, Federation of Malaya (now Malaysia)
- Party: Democratic Action Party (DAP)
- Other political affiliations: Pakatan Rakyat (PR) (2008–2015); Pakatan Harapan (PH) (–2015)
- Education: University of London
- Occupation: Politician
- Profession: Lawyer
- Website: thanasekharan.com

Tanasekharan s/o Autherapady (Tamil: ஔ. தனசேகரன்) is a Malaysian lawyer and politician. He is the former Democratic Action Party (DAP) assemblyman for Bagan Dalam, Penang for two terms from 2008 to 2018. Tanasekharan was dropped by DAP as a candidate in the 2018 general election.

Tanasekharan is also currently serving as Vice Chairman for Penang Hindu Endowments Board.

== Early life ==
Tanasekharan was born in Kuala Kurau, Perak and received his primary school education in Wellesley Primary School Penang and secondary education in Penang Free School. Upon completing secondary education, he continued studying for Law in an External Programme with University of London and completed Law Degree in 1982.

== Election results ==
Parliament of Malaysia
Year	Constituency	Candidate	Votes	Pct	Opponent(s)	Votes	Pct	Ballots cast	Majority	Turnout
2004	P046 Batu Kawan	Tanasekharan Autherapady (DAP)	6,552	20.64%	Huan Cheng Guan (Gerakan)	17,097	53.85%	32,559	8,998	75.62%
2004	P046 Batu Kawan	Tanasekharan Autherapady (DAP)	6,552	20.64%	Law Choo Kiang (PKR)	8,099	25.51%	32,559	8,998	75.62%

Penang State Legislative Assembly
Year	Constituency	Candidate	Votes	Pct	Opponent(s)	Votes	Pct	Ballots cast	Majority	Turnout
2008	N09 Bagan Dalam	Tanasekharan Autherapady (DAP)	7,601	61.90%	Subbaiyah Palaniappan (MIC)	4,669	38.10%	12,546	2,932	73.00%
2013	N09 Bagan Dalam	Tanasekharan Autherapady (DAP)	10,253	66.40%	Karuppanan Malairaja (MIC)	5,092	33.00%	15,687	5,161	84.30%
2013	N09 Bagan Dalam	Tanasekharan Autherapady (DAP)	10,253	66.40%	Lim Seang Teik (PCM)	76	0.50%	15,687	5,161	84.30%
2013	N09 Bagan Dalam	Tanasekharan Autherapady (DAP)	10,253	66.40%	Asoghan Govindaraju (IND)	25	0.10%	15,687	5,161	84.30%

== Honours ==
- Penang
  - Officer of the Order of the Defender of State (DSPN) – Dato' (2018)
