= List of high commissioners of Malaysia to Bangladesh =

High Commissioner of Malaysia to Bangladesh
- Incumbent; Haznah Md. Hashim since 2020
- Style: His Excellency
- Seat: Dhaka, Bangladesh
- Appointer: Yang di-Pertuan Agong
- Inaugural holder: Ali Abdullah
- Formation: 1973
- Website: www.kln.gov.my/web/bgd_dhaka/home

The high commissioner of Malaysia to the People's Republic of Bangladesh is the head of Malaysia's diplomatic mission to Bangladesh. The position has the rank and status of an ambassador extraordinary and plenipotentiary and is based in the High Commission of Malaysia, Dhaka.

== List of heads of mission ==
=== High commissioners to Bangladesh ===
High Commissioner	Term start	Term end
Ali Abdullah	1973	20 June 1975
Ismail Ambia	16 December 1975	16 June 1978
Ahmad Faiz Abdul Hamid	27 November 1978	28 April 1981
Mohamed Haron	1 September 1981	16 July 1985
Zainuddin Abdul Rahman	17 September 1985	31 January 1989
Tunku Nazihah Tunku Mohd Rus	11 April 1989	31 March 1992
Ahmad Fuzi Abdul Razak	10 June 1992	December 1994
Mahyuddin Abdul Rahman	1 December 1994	August 1997
Zulkifly Abdul Rahman	18 August 1997	24 July 2000
Mohd Yusof Ahmad	21 August 2000	1 November 2001
Ashaary Sani	2 January 2002	23 October 2005
Abdul Malek Abdul Aziz	27 December 2005	18 December 2008
Jamaluddin Sabeh	23 July 2009	9 June 2012
Norlin Othman	12 July 2012	20 December 2015
Nur Ashikin Mohd Taib	31 January 2016	6 February 2019
Haznah Md. Hashim	2020	Incumbent

== See also ==
- Bangladesh–Malaysia relations
