= Jawi (state constituency) =

State constituency in Penang, Malaysia

Jawi (N19)
Penang constituency

State constituency
- Legislature: Penang State Legislative Assembly
MLA
Jason H'ng Mooi Lye
PH
- Constituency created: 1986
- First contested: 1986
- Last contested: 2023

Demographics
- Electors (2023): 36,601
- Area (km²): 56

Jawi is a state constituency in Penang, Malaysia, that has been represented in the Penang State Legislative Assembly.

The state constituency was first contested in 1986 and is mandated to return a single Assemblyman to the Penang State Legislative Assembly under the first-past-the-post voting system. Since 2018, the State Assemblyman for Jawi is H’ng Mooi Lye from the Democratic Action Party (DAP), which is part of the state's ruling coalition, Pakatan Harapan (PH).

== Definition ==
=== Polling districts ===
According to the federal gazette issued on 30 March 2018, the Jawi constituency is divided into 10 polling districts.

State constituency	Polling districts	Code	Location
Jawi (N19)	Changkat	047/19/01	SK Keledang Jaya
Jawi (N19)	Perkampungan Jawi	047/19/02	SJK (C) Kampung Jawi
Jawi (N19)	Taman Desa Jawi	047/19/03	SMK Jawi
Jawi (N19)	Ladang Caledonia	047/19/04	SJK (C) Pai Teik
Jawi (N19)	Ladang Byram	047/19/05	SJK (T) Ldg Byram
Jawi (N19)	Ladang Victoria	047/19/06	SMK Seri Nibong
Jawi (N19)	Taman Sentosa	047/19/07	SK Nibong Tebal
Jawi (N19)	Nibong Tebal	047/19/08	SMK Methodist
Jawi (N19)	Jalan Bukit Panchor	047/19/09	Kolej Vokesional Nibong Tebal
Jawi (N19)	Taman Helang Jaya	047/19/10	SMK Tunku Abdul Rahman

== Demographics ==
Ethnic breakdown of Jawi's electorate as of 2023
1. Chinese (52.6%)
2. Indian (25.6%)
3. Malay (21.3%)
4. Other ethnicities (0.53%)

Total electors by polling district in 2016
Polling district	Electors
Changkat	2,633
Perkampungan Jawi	2,315
Taman Desa Jawi	4,063
Ladang Caledonia	4,275
Ladang Byram	732
Ladang Victoria	1,206
Taman Sentosa	2,996
Nibong Tebal	1,394
Jalan Bukit Panchor	1,122
Taman Helang Jaya	4,537
Total	25,273
Source: Malaysian Election Commission

== History ==
Penang State Legislative Assemblyman for Jawi
Assembly	No	Years	Member	Party
Constituency created from Bukit Tambun, Sungai Bakap and Sungai Acheh
7th	N17	1986 – 1990	Chin Kooi Thoon (陈钜泉)	DAP
8th	N17	1990 – 1995	Chin Kooi Thoon (陈钜泉)	GR (DAP)
9th	N17	1995 – 1999	Tan Cheng Liang (陈清凉)	BN (MCA)
10th	N17	1999 – 2004	Tan Cheng Liang (陈清凉)	BN (MCA)
11th	N19	2004 – 2008	Tan Cheng Liang (陈清凉)	BN (MCA)
12th	N19	2008 – 2013	Tan Beng Huat (陈明发)	PR (DAP)
13th	N19	2013 – 2018	Soon Lip Chee (孫意志)	PR (DAP)
14th	N19	2018 – 2023	Jason H'ng Mooi Lye (方美铼)	PH (DAP)
15th	N19	2023–present	Jason H'ng Mooi Lye (方美铼)	PH (DAP)

== Election results ==
The electoral results for the Jawi state constituency are as follows.

Penang state election, 2023
Party	Candidate	Votes	%	∆%
PH	Jason H'ng Mooi Lye	20,641	79.50	▲0.80
PN	Steven Koh Tien Yew	5,322	20.50	▲20.50
Total valid votes		25,963	100.00	
Total rejected ballots		290		
Unreturned ballots		31		
Turnout		26,284	71.81	▼13.49
Registered electors		36,601		
Majority		15,319	59.00	▼1.00
PH hold		Swing		

Penang state election, 2018
Party	Candidate	Votes	%	∆%
PKR	Jason H'ng Mooi Lye	17,559	78.70	▲78.70
BN	Kiew Hen Chong	4,188	18.70	▼10.10
People's Alternative Party	Tan Beng Huat	309	1.40	▲1.40
BERSAMA	Koay Xing Boon	165	0.70	▲0.70
Penang Front Party	Daphne Edward	73	0.30	▲0.30
Parti Rakyat Malaysia	Tan Chew Suan	51	0.20	▲0.20
Total valid votes		22,345	100.00	
Total rejected ballots		377		
Unreturned ballots		56		
Turnout		22,778	85.30	▼2.40
Registered electors		26,699		
Majority		13,371	60.00	▲17.60
PKR hold		Swing		
Source(s) "His Majesty's Government Gazette - Notice of Contested Election, State Legislative Assembly for the State of Penang [P.U. (B) 252/2018]" (PDF). Attorney General's Chambers of Malaysia. 3 May 2018. "Federal Government Gazette - Results of Contested Election and Statements of the Poll after the Official Addition of Votes, State Constituencies for the State of Penang [P.U. (B) 326/2018]" (PDF). Attorney General's Chambers of Malaysia. 28 May 2018. Archived from the original (PDF) on 2019-08-29.

Penang state election, 2013
Party	Candidate	Votes	%	∆%
DAP	Soon Lip Chee	15,219	71.20	▲9.10
BN	Tan Cheng Liang	6,143	28.80	▼9.10
Total valid votes		21,362	100.00	
Total rejected ballots		339		
Unreturned ballots		0		
Turnout		21,701	87.70	▲7.90
Registered electors		24,735		
Majority		9,076	42.40	▲18.20
DAP hold		Swing		
Source(s) "Federal Government Gazette - Notice of Contested Election, State Legislative Assembly for the State of Penang [P.U. (B) 189/2013]" (PDF). Attorney General's Chambers of Malaysia. 26 April 2013. "Federal Government Gazette - Results of Contested Election and Statements of the Poll after the Official Addition of Votes, State Constituencies for the State of Penang [P.U. (B) 230/2013]" (PDF). Attorney General's Chambers of Malaysia. 22 May 2013. Archived from the original (PDF) on 2019-03-22.

Penang state election, 2008
Party	Candidate	Votes	%	∆%
DAP	Tan Beng Huat	9,739	62.10	▲32.31
BN	Tan Cheng Liang	5,949	37.90	▼27.03
Total valid votes		15,688	100.00	
Total rejected ballots		413		
Unreturned ballots		0		
Turnout		16,101	79.80	▲1.77
Registered electors		20,167		
Majority		3,790	24.20	▼10.94
DAP gain from BN		Swing		?

Penang state election, 2004
Party	Candidate	Votes	%	∆%
BN	Tan Cheng Liang	8,733	64.93	▲11.76
DAP	Teoh Seang Hooi	4,007	29.79	▼17.04
Independent	Ganesh Kailasani	710	5.28	▲5.28
Total valid votes		13,450	100.00	
Total rejected ballots		480		
Unreturned ballots		22		
Turnout		13,952	78.03	▼1.01
Registered electors		17,880		
Majority		3,790	35.14	▲28.80
BN hold		Swing		

Penang state election, 1999
Party	Candidate	Votes	%	∆%
BN	Tan Cheng Liang	8,879	53.17	▲1.11
DAP	Teoh Seang Hooi	7,819	46.83	▼1.11
Total valid votes		16,698	100.00	
Total rejected ballots		451		
Unreturned ballots		13		
Turnout		17,162	79.04	▼0.09
Registered electors		21,712		
Majority		1,060	6.34	▲2.22
BN hold		Swing		

Penang state election, 1995
Party	Candidate	Votes	%	∆%
BN	Tan Cheng Liang	8,355	52.06	▲13.23
DAP	Goh Kheng Huat	7,694	47.94	▼13.23
Total valid votes		16,049	100.00	
Total rejected ballots		420		
Unreturned ballots		29		
Turnout		16,498	79.13	▼0.72
Registered electors		20,850		
Majority		661	4.12	▼18.22
BN gain from DAP		Swing		?

Penang state election, 1990
Party	Candidate	Votes	%	∆%
DAP	Chin Kooi Thoon	8,827	61.17	▲2.38
BN	Teoh Kooi Sneah	5,604	38.83	▼2.38
Total valid votes		14,431	100.00	
Total rejected ballots		440		
Unreturned ballots		8		
Turnout		14,879	79.85	▲3.81
Registered electors		18,646		
Majority		3,223	22.34	▲4.76
DAP hold		Swing		

Penang state election, 1986
Party	Candidate	Votes	%
DAP	Chin Kooi Thoon	7,514	58.79
BN	Khoo Soo Kheng	5,268	41.21
Total valid votes		12,782	100.00
Total rejected ballots		446	
Unreturned ballots		0	
Turnout		13,228	76.04
Registered electors		17,397	
Majority		2,246	17.58
This was a new constituency created.

== See also ==
- Constituencies of Penang
