= Phee Syn Tze =

Malaysian politician

Yang Berhormat Puan Phee Syn Tze MLA
- 彭心慈

Member of the Penang State Legislative Assembly for Sungai Puyu
- Incumbent
- Assumed office 12 August 2023
- Preceded by: Phee Boon Poh (PH–DAP)
- Majority: 21,330 (2023)

Personal details
- Born: Phee Syn Tze; 7 February 1985 (age 41) Malaysia
- Citizenship: Malaysian
- Party: Democratic Action Party (DAP)
- Other political affiliations: Pakatan Harapan
- Parent: Phee Boon Poh (father)
- Occupation: Politician

Phee Syn Tze (born 7 February 1985) is a Malaysian politician who has served as Member of the Penang State Legislative Assembly (MLA) for Sungai Puyu since August 2023. She is a member of the Democratic Action Party (DAP), a component party of the Pakatan Harapan (PH) coalition and the daughter of former Member of the Penang State Executive Council (EXCO) and former Sungai Puyu MLA Phee Boon Poh.

== Election results ==
Penang State Legislative Assembly
| Year | Constituency | Candidate | Votes | Pct. | Opponent(s) | Votes | Pct. | Ballots cast | Majority | Turnout |
|---|---|---|---|---|---|---|---|---|---|---|
| 2023 | N07 Sungai Puyu | Phee Syn Tze (DAP) | 23,838 | 90.48% | Teow Chin Siang (PAS) | 2,508 | 9.52% | 26,569 | 21,330 | 74.00% |
