= Kumaran Krishnan =

Malaysian politician

Yang Berhormat Tuan Kumaran Krishnan MLA
- குமரன் கிருஷ்ணன்

Member of the Penang State Legislative Assembly for Bagan Dalam
- Incumbent
- Assumed office 12 August 2023
- Preceded by: Satees Muniandy (PH–DAP)
- Majority: 7,542 (2023)

Personal details
- Born: Kumaran s/o Krishnan; 20 February 1978 (age 48) Malaysia
- Citizenship: Malaysian
- Party: Democratic Action Party (DAP)
- Other political affiliations: Pakatan Harapan (PH)
- Occupation: Politician

Kumaran s/o Krishnan (born 20 February 1978) is a Malaysian politician who has served as Member of the Penang State Legislative Assembly (MLA) for Bagan Dalam since August 2023. He is a member of the Democratic Action Party (DAP), a component of the Pakatan Harapan (PH) coalition.

== Election results ==
Penang State Legislative Assembly
Year	Constituency	Candidate	Votes	Pct.	Opponent(s)	Votes	Pct.	Ballots cast	Majority	Turnout
2023	N09 Bagan Dalam	Kumaran Krishnan (DAP)	10,506	71.49%	Jayaraman Kunchu Kannu (PAS)	2,964	20.17%	14,868	7,542	70.06%
2023	N09 Bagan Dalam	Kumaran Krishnan (DAP)	10,506	71.49%	Satees Muniandy (IND)	1,111	7.56%	14,868	7,542	70.06%
2023	N09 Bagan Dalam	Kumaran Krishnan (DAP)	10,506	71.49%	S. Rajasakanan (PFP)	115	0.78%	14,868	7,542	70.06%
