= World Islamic Economic Forum =

Business forum headquartered in Malaysia

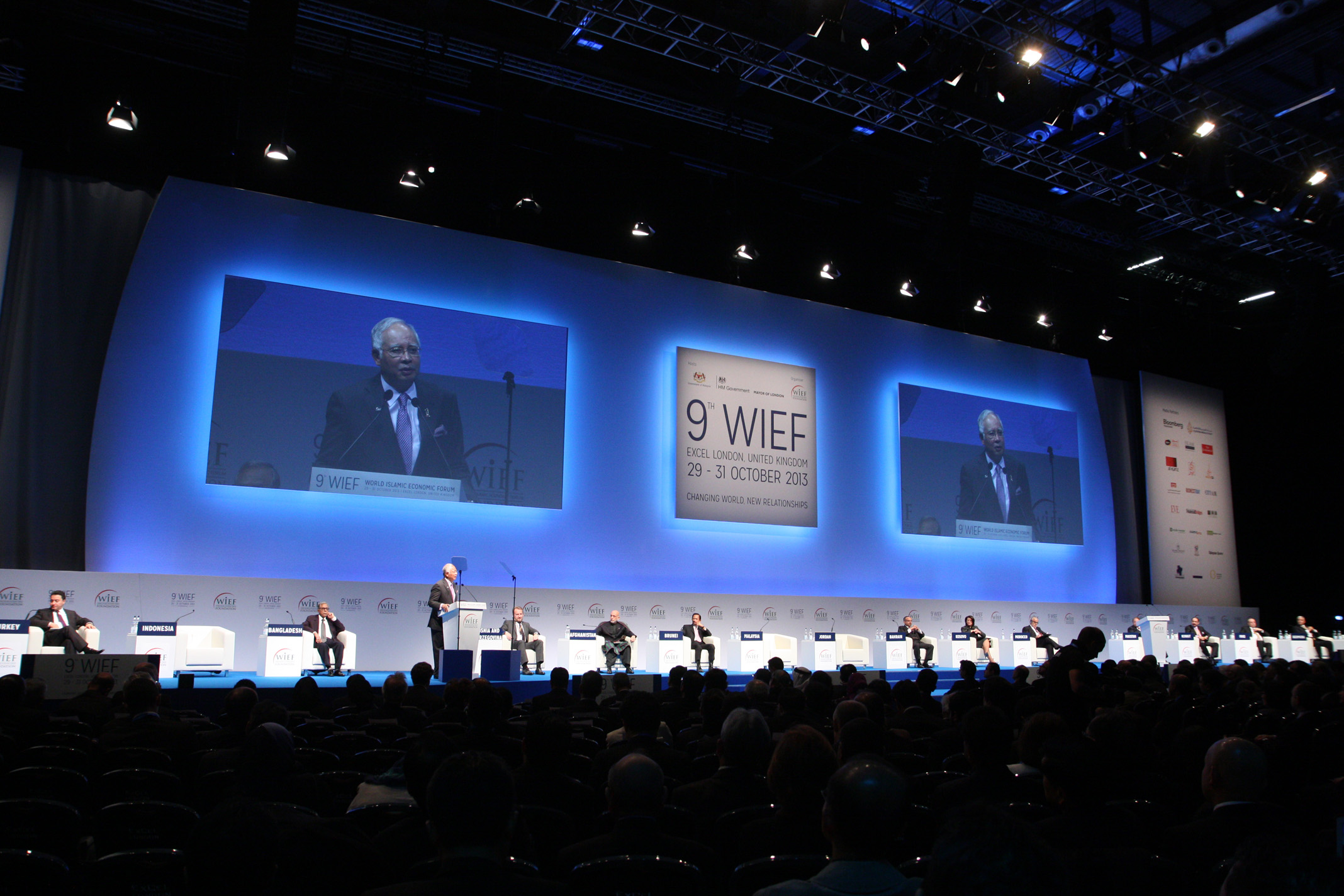
- Ongoing session of 9th World Islamic Economic Forum
- Type: Nonprofit organization
- Legal status: Foundation
- Headquarters: Malaysia
- Region served: Worldwide
- Official language: English
- Chairman: Hon. Tun Musa Hitam
- Website: wief.org

The World Islamic Economic Forum (WIEF) or World Islamic Economic Forum Foundation is a business forum headquartered in Malaysia. Its purpose is to promote business, link the Muslim and non-Muslim worlds, and to guide the world towards peace and prosperity. The first World Islamic Economic Forum was held in Kuala Lumpur, Malaysia and the 14th and next WIEF will be held in October 2020, in Qatar.
