= Chee Yeeh Keen =

Malaysian politician

Yang Berhormat Tuan Chee Yeeh Keen MLA
- 朱悦权

Member of the Penang State Legislative Assembly for Bagan Jermal
- Incumbent
- Assumed office 12 August 2023
- Preceded by: Soon Lip Chee (PH–DAP)
- Majority: 16,149 (2023)

Personal details
- Born: Chee Yeeh Keen; 9 January 1982 (age 44) Malaysia
- Citizenship: Malaysian
- Party: Democratic Action Party (DAP) (since 2009)
- Other political affiliations: Pakatan Rakyat (PR) (2009–2015); Pakatan Harapan (PH) (since 2015)
- Children: 3
- Occupation: Politician

Chee Yeeh Keen (born 9 January 1982) is a Malaysian politician who has served as Member of the Penang State Legislative Assembly (MLA) for Bagan Jermal since August 2023. He is a member of the Democratic Action Party (DAP), a component party of the Pakatan Harapan (PH) and formerly Pakatan Rakyat (PR) coalitions.

== Election results ==
Penang State Legislative Assembly
Year	Constituency	Candidate	Votes	Pct.	Opponent(s)	Votes	Pct.	Ballots cast	Majority	Turnout
2023	N08 Bagan Jermal	Chee Yeeh Keen (DAP)	19,687	84.77%	Ong Chuan Jin (BERSATU)	3,538	15.23%	23,446	16,149	72.08%
