= Sungai Puyu =

Malaysian state constituency

Sungai Puyu (N07)
Penang constituency

State constituency
- Legislature: Penang State Legislative Assembly
MLA
Phee Syn Tze
PH
- Constituency created: 1995
- First contested: 1995
- Last contested: 2023

Demographics
- Electors (2023): 35,904
- Area (km²): 7

Sungai Puyu is a state constituency in Penang, Malaysia, that has been represented in the Penang State Legislative Assembly.

Since 2004 The State Assemblyman for Sungai Puyu is Phee Boon Poh from the Democratic Action Party (DAP), which is part of the state's ruling coalition, Pakatan Harapan (PH).

== Definition ==
The Sungai Puyu constituency contains the polling districts of 8 polling districts.

| State constituency | Polling districts | Code | Location |
|---|---|---|---|
| Sungai Puyu (N07) | Bagan Ajam | 043/07/01 | SK Bagan Ajam |
| Sungai Puyu (N07) | Permatang Tengah | 043/07/02 | SMJK Chung Ling Butterworth |
| Sungai Puyu (N07) | Sungai Puyu | 043/07/03 | SK Sungai Puyu |
| Sungai Puyu (N07) | Kampong Bahru | 043/07/04 | SMK Bagan Jaya |
| Sungai Puyu (N07) | Bagan Lalang | 043/07/05 | SK Sungai Puyu |
| Sungai Puyu (N07) | Taman Merbau | 043/07/06 | SK Bagan Ajam |
| Sungai Puyu (N07) | Taman Dedap | 043/07/07 | SMJK Chung Ling Butterworth |
| Sungai Puyu (N07) | Taman Bunga Tanjung | 043/07/08 | SMK Bagan Jaya |

== Demographics ==
Ethnic breakdown of Sungai Puyu's electorate as of 2023
1. Chinese (83.1%)
2. Malay (8.41%)
3. Indian (8.11%)
4. Other ethnicities (0.37%)

Total electors by polling district in 2016
| Polling district | Electors |
|---|---|
| Bagan Ajam | 2,564 |
| Permatang Tengah | 3,441 |
| Sungai Puyu | 1,810 |
| Kampong Bahru | 3,731 |
| Bagan Lalang | 3,631 |
| Taman Merbau | 3,338 |
| Taman Dedap | 4,665 |
| Taman Bunga Tanjung | 2,935 |
| Total | 26,115 |
Source: Malaysian Election Commission

== History ==
The Sungai Puyu state constituency was created and first contested during the 1995 State Election.

Loo Ah Dee and Lee Ah Lee, politicians from Malaysian Chinese Association (MCA) first held the seat from 1995 to 2004. During the 2004 state elections, the constituency was wrested from the Barisan Nasional (BN) federal ruling coalition by Phee Boon Poh, a DAP politician. Phee has held Sungai Puyu since.

Penang State Legislative Assemblyman for Sungai Puyu
| Assembly | No | Years | Member | Party |
Constituency created from Mak Mandin, Bagan Jermal and Sungai Dua
| 9th | N07 | 1995 – 1999 | Loo Ah Dee @ Lee Ah Lee (吕亚历) | BN (MCA) |
| 10th | N07 | 1999 – 2004 | Loo Ah Dee @ Lee Ah Lee (吕亚历) | BN (MCA) |
| 11th | N07 | 2004 – 2008 | Phee Boon Poh (彭文宝) | PR (DAP) |
| 12th | N07 | 2008 – 2013 | Phee Boon Poh (彭文宝) | PR (DAP) |
| 13th | N07 | 2013 – 2018 | Phee Boon Poh (彭文宝) | PR (DAP) |
| 14th | N07 | 2018 – 2023 | Phee Boon Poh (彭文宝) | PH (DAP) |
| 15th | N07 | 2023–present | Phee Syn Tze (彭心慈) | PH (DAP) |

== Election results ==
Penang state election, 2023: Sungai Puyu
| Party | Candidate | Votes | % | ∆% |
|---|---|---|---|---|
| PH | Phee Syn Tze | 23,838 | 90.48 | ▲0.28 |
| PN | Teow Chin Siang | 2,508 | 9.52 | ▲9.52 |
| Total valid votes | | 26,346 | 100.00 | |
| Total rejected ballots | | 207 | | |
| Unreturned ballots | | 16 | | |
| Turnout | | 26,569 | 74.00 | ▼13.80 |
| Registered electors | | 35,904 | | |
| Majority | | 21,330 | 80.96 | ▼0.34 |
| PH hold | | Swing | | |

Penang state election, 2018: Sungai Puyu
| Party | Candidate | Votes | % | ∆% |
|---|---|---|---|---|
| PKR | Phee Boon Poh | 21,705 | 90.20 | ▲90.20 |
| BN | Lim Hai Song | 2,136 | 8.90 | ▼5.20 |
| Parti Rakyat Malaysia | Tan Lay Hock | 101 | 0.40 | ▲0.40 |
| BERSAMA | Neoh Bok Keng | 79 | 0.30 | ▲0.30 |
| Penang Front Party | Ong Yin Yin | 51 | 0.20 | ▲0.20 |
| Total valid votes | | 24,072 | 100.00 | |
| Total rejected ballots | | 137 | | |
| Unreturned ballots | | 25 | | |
| Turnout | | 24,234 | 87.80 | ▼2.10 |
| Registered electors | | 27,671 | | |
| Majority | | 19,569 | 81.30 | ▲9.50 |
| PKR hold | | Swing | | |
Source(s) "His Majesty's Government Gazette - Notice of Contested Election, State Legislative Assembly for the State of Penang [P.U. (B) 252/2018]" (PDF). Attorney General's Chambers of Malaysia. 3 May 2018. "Federal Government Gazette - Results of Contested Election and Statements of the Poll after the Official Addition of Votes, State Constituencies for the State of Penang [P.U. (B) 326/2018]" (PDF). Attorney General's Chambers of Malaysia. 28 May 2018. Archived from the original (PDF) on 2019-08-29.

Penang state election, 2013: Sungai Puyu
| Party | Candidate | Votes | % | ∆% |
|---|---|---|---|---|
| DAP | Phee Boon Poh | 19,381 | 85.90 | ▲8.87 |
| BN | Sum Yoo Keong | 3,174 | 14.10 | ▼8.87 |
| Total valid votes | | 22,555 | 100.00 | |
| Total rejected ballots | | 174 | | |
| Unreturned ballots | | 0 | | |
| Turnout | | 22,729 | 89.90 | ▲7.50 |
| Registered electors | | 25,282 | | |
| Majority | | 16,207 | 71.80 | ▲17.47 |
| DAP hold | | Swing | | |
Source(s) "Federal Government Gazette - Notice of Contested Election, State Legislative Assembly for the State of Penang [P.U. (B) 189/2013]" (PDF). Attorney General's Chambers of Malaysia. 26 April 2013. "Federal Government Gazette - Results of Contested Election and Statements of the Poll after the Official Addition of Votes, State Constituencies for the State of Penang [P.U. (B) 230/2013]" (PDF). Attorney General's Chambers of Malaysia. 22 May 2013. Archived from the original (PDF) on 2019-03-22.

Penang state election, 2008: Sungai Puyu
| Party | Candidate | Votes | % | ∆% |
|---|---|---|---|---|
| DAP | Phee Boon Poh | 13,025 | 77.03 | ▲25.03 |
| BN | Tay Lay Cheng | 3,824 | 22.70 | ▼25.03 |
| Total valid votes | | 16,849 | 100.00 | |
| Total rejected ballots | | 210 | | |
| Unreturned ballots | | 2 | | |
| Turnout | | 17,061 | 82.40 | ▲1.90 |
| Registered electors | | 20,708 | | |
| Majority | | 9,201 | 54.33 | ▲50.33 |
| DAP hold | | Swing | | |

Penang state election, 2004: Sungai Puyu
| Party | Candidate | Votes | % | ∆% |
|---|---|---|---|---|
| DAP | Phee Boon Poh | 7,808 | 52.00 | ▲4.04 |
| BN | Loo Ah Dee | 7,201 | 48.00 | ▼4.04 |
| Total valid votes | | 15,009 | 100.00 | |
| Total rejected ballots | | 299 | | |
| Unreturned ballots | | 1 | | |
| Turnout | | 15,309 | 80.50 | ▲0.53 |
| Registered electors | | 19,009 | | |
| Majority | | 607 | 4.00 | ▼0.08 |
| DAP gain from BN | | Swing | | ? |

Penang state election, 1999: Sungai Puyu
| Party | Candidate | Votes | % | ∆% |
|---|---|---|---|---|
| BN | Loo Ah Dee | 10,859 | 52.04 | ▲1.62 |
| DAP | Phee Boon Poh | 9,789 | 47.96 | ▼1.62 |
| Total valid votes | | 20,347 | 100.00 | |
| Total rejected ballots | | 389 | | |
| Unreturned ballots | | 1 | | |
| Turnout | | 21,038 | 79.97 | ▼2.07 |
| Registered electors | | 26,308 | | |
| Majority | | 1,070 | 4.08 | ▲3.24 |
| BN hold | | Swing | | |

Penang state election, 1995: Sungai Puyu
| Party | Candidate | Votes | % |
|---|---|---|---|
| BN | Loo Ah Dee | 9,937 | 50.42 |
| DAP | Cheah Tiek Soon | 9,771 | 49.58 |
| Total valid votes | | 19,708 | 100.00 |
| Total rejected ballots | | 408 | |
| Unreturned ballots | | 21 | |
| Turnout | | 20,137 | 82.04 |
| Registered electors | | 24,545 | |
| Majority | | 166 | 0.84 |
This was a new constituency created.

== See also ==
- Constituencies of Penang
