= Perai (state constituency) =

State constituency in Penang, Malaysia

Perai (N16)
Penang constituency

State constituency
- Legislature: Penang State Legislative Assembly
MLA
Sundarajoo Somu
PH
- Constituency created: 1986 (as Prai)
- First contested: 1986
- Last contested: 2023

Demographics
- Electors (2023): 20,479
- Area (km²): 11

Perai is a state constituency in Penang, Malaysia, that has been represented in the Penang State Legislative Assembly.

The state constituency was first contested in 2004 and is mandated to return a single Assemblyman to the Penang State Legislative Assembly under the first-past-the-post voting system. Since 2018, the State Assemblyman for Perai is Ramasamy Palanisamy from the Democratic Action Party (DAP), which is part of the state's ruling coalition, Pakatan Harapan (PH).

== Definition ==
=== Polling districts ===
According to the federal gazette issued on 18 July 2023 the Perai constituency is divided into 6 polling districts.

State constituency	Polling Districts	Code	Location
Perai（N16）	Taman Indrawasih	046/16/01	SMK Taman Inderawasih
Perai（N16）	Taman Chai Leng	046/16/02	SK Taman Inderawasih
Perai（N16）	Perai	046/16/03	SJK (T) Perai
Perai（N16）	Taman Perai	046/16/04	SK Khir Johari
Perai（N16）	Taman Supreme	046/16/05	SMK Prai
Perai（N16）	Taman Kimsar	046/16/06	SJK (C) Chung Hwa 3

== Demographics ==
Ethnic breakdown of Perai's electorate as of 2023
1. Chinese (49.9%)
2. Indian (35.6%)
3. Malay (13.2%)
4. Other ethnicities (1.24%)

Total electors by polling district in 2016
Polling district	Electors
Taman Indrawasih	4,233
Taman Chai Leng	3,224
Perai	2,268
Taman Perai	999
Taman Supreme	2,937
Taman Kimsar	2,403
Total	16,064
Source: Malaysian Election Commission

== History ==
Penang State Legislative Assemblyman for Perai
Assembly	No	Years	Member	Party
Constituency created from Bagan Dalam and Bukit Tengah
Prai
7th	N09	1986 – 1990	Shanmugam Nadason	DAP
8th	N09	1990 – 1991	S. Asamaley	DAP
8th	N09	1991 – 1995	Valli Muthusamy	BN (MIC)
Perai
9th	N09	1995 – 1999	Rajapathy Kuppusamy	BN (MIC)
10th	N09	1999 – 2004	Rajapathy Kuppusamy	BN (MIC)
11th	N16	2004 – 2008	Rajapathy Kuppusamy	BN (MIC)
12th	N16	2008 – 2013	Ramasamy Palanisamy	PR (DAP)
13th	N16	2013 – 2015	Ramasamy Palanisamy	PR (DAP)
13th	N16	2015 – 2018	Ramasamy Palanisamy	PH (DAP)
14th	N16	2018 – 2023	Ramasamy Palanisamy	PH (DAP)
15th	N16	2023–present	Sundarajoo Somu	PH (DAP)

== Election results ==
The electoral results for the Perai state constituency are as follows.

Penang state election, 2023
Party	Candidate	Votes	%	∆%
PH	Sundarajoo Somu	10,680	76.80	▼5.70
PN	Sivasuntaram Rajalinggam	1,541	11.10	▲11.10
Independent	David Marshel Pakianathan	1,439	10.30	▲10.30
MUDA	Vikneswary Harikrishnan	253	1.80	▲1.80
Total valid votes		13,913	100.00	
Total rejected ballots		120		
Unreturned ballots		11		
Turnout		14,044	68.58	▼12.52
Registered electors		20,479		
Majority		9,139	65.70	▼0.70
PH hold		Swing		

Penang state election, 2018
Party	Candidate	Votes	%	∆%
PKR	Ramasamy Palanisamy	11,243	82.50	▲82.50
BN	Suresh Muniandy	2,194	16.10	▼3.30
Penang Front Party	Ooi Khar Giap	104	0.80	▲0.80
Parti Rakyat Malaysia	Samuganathan Muniandy	37	0.20	▲0.20
People's Alternative Party	Asoghan Govindaraju	33	0.20	▲0.20
Independent	Kumary Retnam	23	0.20	▲0.20
Total valid votes		13,634	100.00	
Total rejected ballots		168		
Unreturned ballots		17		
Turnout		13,819	81.10	▼2.80
Registered electors		17,032		
Majority		9,049	66.40	▲6.60
PKR hold		Swing		
Source(s) "His Majesty's Government Gazette - Notice of Contested Election, State Legislative Assembly for the State of Penang [P.U. (B) 252/2018]" (PDF). Attorney General's Chambers of Malaysia. 3 May 2018. "Federal Government Gazette - Results of Contested Election and Statements of the Poll after the Official Addition of Votes, State Constituencies for the State of Penang [P.U. (B) 326/2018]" (PDF). Attorney General's Chambers of Malaysia. 28 May 2018. Archived from the original (PDF) on 29 August 2019.

Penang state election, 2013
Party	Candidate	Votes	%	∆%
DAP	Ramasamy Palanisamy	10,549	79.20	▲6.00
BN	Krishnan Letchumanan	2,590	19.40	▼4.40
Independent	Muhammad Ridhwan Sulaiman	184	1.40	▲1.40
Total valid votes		13,323	100.00	
Total rejected ballots		142		
Unreturned ballots		0		
Turnout		13,465	83.90	▲8.50
Registered electors		16,058		
Majority		7,959	59.80	▲10.40
DAP hold		Swing		
Source(s) "Federal Government Gazette - Notice of Contested Election, State Legislative Assembly for the State of Penang [P.U. (B) 189/2013]" (PDF). Attorney General's Chambers of Malaysia. 26 April 2013. "Federal Government Gazette - Results of Contested Election and Statements of the Poll after the Official Addition of Votes, State Constituencies for the State of Penang [P.U. (B) 230/2013]" (PDF). Attorney General's Chambers of Malaysia. 22 May 2013. Archived from the original (PDF) on 22 March 2019.

Penang state election, 2008
Party	Candidate	Votes	%	∆%
DAP	Ramasamy Palanisamy	7,668	73.20	▲20.14
BN	Krishnan Letchumanan	2,492	23.80	▼23.14
Independent	Ulaganathan Ramasamy	311	3.00	▲3.00
Total valid votes		10,471	100.00	
Total rejected ballots		180		
Unreturned ballots		0		
Turnout		10,651	75.40	▲4.83
Registered electors		14,124		
Majority		4,241	49.40	▲43.28
DAP gain from BN		Swing		?

Penang state election, 2004
Party	Candidate	Votes	%	∆%
BN	Rajapathy Kuppusamy	5,060	53.06	▼5.04
DAP	Chong Eng	4,477	46.94	▲6.19
Total valid votes		9,537	100.00	
Total rejected ballots		206		
Unreturned ballots		0		
Turnout		9,748	70.57	▲0.30
Registered electors		13,813		
Majority		583	6.12	▼11.23
BN hold		Swing		

Penang state election, 1999
Party	Candidate	Votes	%	∆%
BN	Rajapathy Kuppusamy	9,174	58.10	▲2.95
DAP	S. Neelamekan	6,435	40.75	▼5.10
Independent	K. Vijaya Kumari	182	1.15	▲1.15
Total valid votes		15,791	100.00	
Total rejected ballots		382		
Unreturned ballots		0		
Turnout		16,176	70.27	▼2.59
Registered electors		23,020		
Majority		2,739	17.35	▲8.05
BN hold		Swing		

Penang state election, 1995
Party	Candidate	Votes	%	∆%
BN	Rajapathy Kuppusamy	9,047	55.15	▲0.70
DAP	Patto Perumal	7,357	45.85	▼0.54
Total valid votes		16,404	100.00	
Total rejected ballots		408		
Unreturned ballots		37		
Turnout		16,849	72.86	▲4.46
Registered electors		23,124		
Majority		1,690	10.30	▲1.24
BN hold		Swing		

Penang state by-election, 27 July 1991: Prai The by-election was called due to the resignation of incumbent, S. Asamaley.
Party	Candidate	Votes	%	∆%
BN	Valli Muthusamy	5,182	54.45	▲6.20
DAP	Karpal Singh Ram Singh	4,320	45.39	▼6.36
Independent	Muniandy Tarumalingan	15	0.16	▲0.16
Total valid votes		9,517	100.00	
Total rejected ballots		103		
Unreturned ballots		19		
Turnout		9,639	68.40	▼5.32
Registered electors		14,092		
Majority		862	9.06	▲5.56
BN gain from DAP		Swing		?

Penang state election, 1990: Prai
Party	Candidate	Votes	%	∆%
DAP	S. Asamaley	5,250	51.75	▼2.51
BN	Valli Muthusamy	4,895	48.25	▲11.72
Total valid votes		10,145	100.00	
Total rejected ballots		234		
Unreturned ballots		0		
Turnout		10,388	73.72	▲4.10
Registered electors		14,092		
Majority		355	3.50	▼14.23
DAP hold		Swing		

Penang state election, 1986: Prai
Party	Candidate	Votes	%
DAP	Shanmugam Nadason	5,117	54.26
BN	Subbiah Thevarayan Chettiar	3,445	36.53
Independent	Lim Eng Seng	870	9.23
Total valid votes		9,430	100.00
Total rejected ballots		288	
Unreturned ballots		0	
Turnout		9,720	69.62
Registered electors		13,961	
Majority		1,672	17.73
This was a new constituency created.

== See also ==
- Constituencies of Penang
