= Bagan Jermal (state constituency) =

State constituency in Penang, Malaysia

Bagan Jermal (N08)
Penang constituency

State constituency
- Legislature: Penang State Legislative Assembly
MLA
Chee Yeeh Keen
PH
- Constituency created: 1974
- First contested: 1974
- Last contested: 2023

Demographics
- Electors (2023): 32,529
- Area (km²): 6

Bagan Jermal is a state constituency in Penang, Malaysia, that has been represented in the Penang State Legislative Assembly.

The state constituency was first contested in 1974 and is mandated to return a single Assemblyman to the Penang State Legislative Assembly under the first-past-the-post voting system. Since 2018, the State Assemblyman for Bagan Jermal is Soon Lip Chee from Democratic Action Party (DAP), which is part of the state's ruling coalition, Pakatan Harapan (PH).

== Definition ==
=== Polling districts ===
According to the federal gazette issued on 18 July 2023, the Bagan Jermal constituency is divided into 9 polling districts.

| State constituency | Polling districts | Code | Location |
|---|---|---|---|
| Bagan Jermal (N08) | Bagan Jermal | 043/08/01 | SK Bagan Jermal |
| Bagan Jermal (N08) | Kubang Buaya | 043/08/02 | SMK Kampong Kastam |
| Bagan Jermal (N08) | Kampong Gajah | 043/08/03 | SJK (C) Chung Hwa Pusat |
| Bagan Jermal (N08) | Jalan Mengkuang | 043/08/04 | SK Bagan Tuan Kechil |
| Bagan Jermal (N08) | Kampong Simpa | 043/08/05 | SK Mak Mandin |
| Bagan Jermal (N08) | Mak Mandin | 043/08/06 | SMK Mak Mandin |
| Bagan Jermal (N08) | Taman Sukaria | 043/08/07 | SJK (T) Mak Mandin |
| Bagan Jermal (N08) | Taman Melor | 043/08/08 | SJK (C) Kwang Hwa |
| Bagan Jermal (N08) | Taman Cantik | 043/08/09 | SJK (C) Mak Mandin |

== Demographics ==
Ethnic breakdown of Bagan Jermal's electorate as of 2023
1. Chinese (66.7%)
2. Indian (16.7%)
3. Malay (16.0%)
4. Other ethnicities (0.63%)

Total electors by polling district in 2016
| Polling district | Electors |
|---|---|
| Bagan Jermal | 2,050 |
| Kubang Buaya | 4,309 |
| Kampong Gajah | 2,315 |
| Jalan Mengkuang | 2,613 |
| Kampong Simpa | 3,363 |
| Mak Mandin | 3,913 |
| Taman Sukaria | 2,638 |
| Taman Melor | 2,171 |
| Taman Cantik | 1,488 |
| Total | 24,860 |
Source: Malaysian Election Commission

== History ==
The Bagan Jermal state constituency was created and first contested during the 1974 State Election. Ong Yi How, a politician from Pekemas first held the Bagan Jermal seat in 1974.

Penang State Legislative Assemblyman for Bagan Jermal
| Assembly | No | Years | Member | Party |
Constituency created from Bagan Ajam and Butterworth
| 4th | N05 | 1974 – 1978 | Ong Yi How (王裕好) | Pekemas |
| 5th | N05 | 1978 – 1982 | Sak Cheng Lum (石清霖) | BN (MCA) |
| 6th | N05 | 1982 – 1986 | Sak Cheng Lum (石清霖) | BN (MCA) |
| 7th | N07 | 1986 – 1990 | Lim Hock Seng (林峰成) | DAP |
| 8th | N07 | 1990 – 1995 | Phee Boon Poh (彭文寶) | GR (DAP) |
| 9th | N08 | 1995 – 1999 | Sak Cheng Lum (石清霖) | BN (MCA) |
| 10th | N08 | 1999 – 2004 | Sak Cheng Lum (石清霖) | BN (MCA) |
| 11th | N08 | 2004 – 2008 | Ooi Chuan Aik (黃泉益) | BN (MCA) |
| 12th | N08 | 2008 – 2013 | Lim Hock Seng (林峰成) | PR (DAP) |
| 13th | N08 | 2013 – 2015 | Lim Hock Seng (林峰成) | PR (DAP) |
| 13th | N08 | 2015 – 2018 | Lim Hock Seng (林峰成) | PH (DAP) |
| 14th | N08 | 2018 – 2023 | Soon Lip Chee (孫意志) | PH (DAP) |
| 15th | N08 | 2023–present | Chee Yeeh Keen (朱悅權) | PH (DAP) |

== Election results ==
Penang state election, 2023
| Party | Candidate | Votes | % | ∆% |
|---|---|---|---|---|
| PH | Chee Yeeh Keen | 19,687 | 84.77 | ▼0.63 |
| PN | Ong Chuan Jin | 3,538 | 15.23 | ▲15.23 |
| Total valid votes | | 23,225 | 100.00 | |
| Total rejected ballots | | 196 | | |
| Unreturned ballots | | 25 | | |
| Turnout | | 23,446 | 72.08 | ▼11.72 |
| Registered electors | | 32,529 | | |
| Majority | | 16,149 | 69.54 | ▼2.26 |
| PH hold | | Swing | | |

Penang state election, 2018
| Party | Candidate | Votes | % | ∆% |
|---|---|---|---|---|
| PKR | Soon Lip Chee | 18,134 | 85.40 | ▲85.40 |
| BN | Ang Chor Keong | 2,898 | 13.60 | ▼8.00 |
| BERSAMA | Hari Devyndran Muniswaran | 106 | 0.50 | ▲0.50 |
| Parti Rakyat Malaysia | Teoh Chai Deng | 74 | 0.40 | ▲0.40 |
| Penang Front Party | Fabian George Albart | 30 | 0.10 | ▲0.10 |
| Total valid votes | | 21,242 | 100.00 | |
| Total rejected ballots | | 185 | | |
| Unreturned ballots | | 32 | | |
| Turnout | | 21,459 | 83.80 | ▼2.80 |
| Registered electors | | 25,621 | | |
| Majority | | 15,236 | 71.80 | ▲15.60 |
| PKR hold | | Swing | | |
Source(s) "His Majesty's Government Gazette - Notice of Contested Election, State Legislative Assembly for the State of Penang [P.U. (B) 252/2018]" (PDF). Attorney General's Chambers of Malaysia. 3 May 2018. "Federal Government Gazette - Results of Contested Election and Statements of the Poll after the Official Addition of Votes, State Constituencies for the State of Penang [P.U. (B) 326/2018]" (PDF). Attorney General's Chambers of Malaysia. 28 May 2018. Archived from the original (PDF) on 29 August 2019.

Penang state election, 2013
| Party | Candidate | Votes | % | ∆% |
|---|---|---|---|---|
| DAP | Lim Hock Seng | 16,416 | 77.80 | ▲9.80 |
| BN | Tan Chuan Hong | 4,561 | 21.60 | ▼10.40 |
| Love Malaysia Party | Lim Kim Chu | 115 | 0.60 | ▲0.60 |
| Total valid votes | | 21,092 | 100.00 | |
| Total rejected ballots | | 222 | | |
| Unreturned ballots | | 0 | | |
| Turnout | | 21,314 | 86.60 | ▲9.40 |
| Registered electors | | 24,608 | | |
| Majority | | 11,855 | 56.20 | ▲20.20 |
| DAP hold | | Swing | | |
Source(s) "Federal Government Gazette - Notice of Contested Election, State Legislative Assembly for the State of Penang [P.U. (B) 189/2013]" (PDF). Attorney General's Chambers of Malaysia. 26 April 2013. "Federal Government Gazette - Results of Contested Election and Statements of the Poll after the Official Addition of Votes, State Constituencies for the State of Penang [P.U. (B) 230/2013]" (PDF). Attorney General's Chambers of Malaysia. 22 May 2013. Archived from the original (PDF) on 22 March 2019.

Penang state election, 2008
| Party | Candidate | Votes | % | ∆% |
|---|---|---|---|---|
| DAP | Lim Hock Seng | 11,099 | 68.00 | ▲29.76 |
| BN | Ooi Chuan Aik | 5,226 | 32.00 | ▼29.76 |
| Total valid votes | | 16,325 | 100.00 | |
| Total rejected ballots | | 247 | | |
| Unreturned ballots | | 7 | | |
| Turnout | | 16,579 | 77.20 | ▲2.19 |
| Registered electors | | 21,483 | | |
| Majority | | 5,873 | 36.00 | ▲14.48 |
| DAP gain from BN | | Swing | | ? |

Penang state election, 2004
| Party | Candidate | Votes | % | ∆% |
|---|---|---|---|---|
| BN | Ooi Chuan Aik | 9,422 | 60.76 | ▲1.29 |
| DAP | Ngu Lek Wah | 6,085 | 39.24 | ▼1.29 |
| Total valid votes | | 15,507 | 100.00 | |
| Total rejected ballots | | 304 | | |
| Unreturned ballots | | 3 | | |
| Turnout | | 15,814 | 75.01 | ▲1.87 |
| Registered electors | | 21,083 | | |
| Majority | | 3,337 | 21.52 | ▲3.58 |
| BN hold | | Swing | | |

Penang state election, 1999
| Party | Candidate | Votes | % | ∆% |
|---|---|---|---|---|
| BN | Sak Cheng Lum | 9,681 | 59.47 | ▼4.76 |
| DAP | Lim Hock Seng | 6,597 | 41.53 | ▲4.76 |
| Total valid votes | | 16,278 | 100.00 | |
| Total rejected ballots | | 356 | | |
| Unreturned ballots | | 28 | | |
| Turnout | | 16,662 | 73.14 | ▼2.32 |
| Registered electors | | 22,780 | | |
| Majority | | 3,084 | 17.94 | ▼9.52 |
| BN hold | | Swing | | |

Penang state election, 1995
| Party | Candidate | Votes | % | ∆% |
|---|---|---|---|---|
| BN | Sak Cheng Lum | 10,871 | 64.23 | ▲26.73 |
| DAP | Phee Boon Poh | 6,053 | 36.77 | ▼26.73 |
| Total valid votes | | 16,924 | 100.00 | |
| Total rejected ballots | | 378 | | |
| Unreturned ballots | | 90 | | |
| Turnout | | 17,392 | 75.46 | ▼4.51 |
| Registered electors | | 23,049 | | |
| Majority | | 4,818 | 27.46 | ▼9.54 |
| BN gain from DAP | | Swing | | ? |

Penang state election, 1990
| Party | Candidate | Votes | % | ∆% |
|---|---|---|---|---|
| DAP | Phee Boon Poh | 11,244 | 63.50 | ▲0.67 |
| BN | Loong Kok Khoon | 6,463 | 26.50 | ▼0.67 |
| Total valid votes | | 17,707 | 100.00 | |
| Total rejected ballots | | 341 | | |
| Unreturned ballots | | 0 | | |
| Turnout | | 18,048 | 79.97 | ▲3.88 |
| Registered electors | | 22,569 | | |
| Majority | | 4,781 | 37.00 | ▲1.34 |
| DAP hold | | Swing | | |

Penang state election, 1986
| Party | Candidate | Votes | % | ∆% |
|---|---|---|---|---|
| DAP | Lim Hock Seng | 9,966 | 62.83 | ▲28.22 |
| BN | Tan Swee Hueng | 5,896 | 27.17 | ▼22.75 |
| Total valid votes | | 15,862 | 100.00 | |
| Total rejected ballots | | 405 | | |
| Unreturned ballots | | 0 | | |
| Turnout | | 16,267 | 76.09 | ▼3.12 |
| Registered electors | | 21,380 | | |
| Majority | | 4,070 | 35.66 | ▲20.35 |
| DAP gain from BN | | Swing | | ? |

Penang state election, 1982
| Party | Candidate | Votes | % | ∆% |
|---|---|---|---|---|
| BN | Sak Cheng Lum | 8,609 | 49.92 | ▲9.11 |
| DAP | Goh Sin Khoon | 5,970 | 34.61 | ▲34.61 |
| Independent | Phee Boon Poh | 2,668 | 15.47 | ▲15.47 |
| Total valid votes | | 17,247 | 100.00 | |
| Total rejected ballots | | 319 | | |
| Unreturned ballots | | 0 | | |
| Turnout | | 17,566 | 79.21 | ▲0.66 |
| Registered electors | | 22,176 | | |
| Majority | | 2,639 | 15.31 | ▲5.65 |
| BN hold | | Swing | | |

Penang state election, 1978
| Party | Candidate | Votes | % | ∆% |
|---|---|---|---|---|
| BN | Sak Cheng Lum | 5,640 | 40.81 | ▲4.96 |
| SDP | Chua Ban Hock | 4,304 | 31.15 | ▲31.15 |
| Independent | Phee Joo Teik | 3,875 | 28.04 | ▲28.04 |
| Total valid votes | | 13,819 | 100.00 | |
| Total rejected ballots | | 541 | | |
| Unreturned ballots | | 0 | | |
| Turnout | | 14,360 | 78.55 | ▼5.65 |
| Registered electors | | 18,282 | | |
| Majority | | 1,336 | 9.66 | ▼6.97 |
| BN gain from PEKEMAS | | Swing | | ? |

Penang state election, 1974
| Party | Candidate | Votes | % |
|---|---|---|---|
| PEKEMAS | Ong Yi How | 4,832 | 52.48 |
| BN | Phee Hoo Teik | 3,301 | 35.85 |
| DAP | Goh Lim Fam | 675 | 7.33 |
| Parti Sosialis Rakyat Malaysia | Ooi Chin Tong | 214 | 2.32 |
| Independent | Loo Phan Kooi | 185 | 2.01 |
| Total valid votes | | 9,207 | 100.00 |
| Total rejected ballots | | 303 | |
| Unreturned ballots | | 0 | |
| Turnout | | 9,510 | 84.20 |
| Registered electors | | 11,347 | |
| Majority | | 1,531 | 16.63 |
This was a new constituency created.

== See also ==
- Constituencies of Penang
