= Ahmad Fuzi Abdul Razak =

Malaysian diplomat

Yang Amat Berbahagia Tun Dato' Seri Utama Ahmad Fuzi Abdul Razak SMN DUPN SPDK PSM DSLJ DMPN DSPN JSM AMN
- أحمد فوزي عبدالرزاق
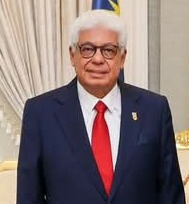

8th Governor of Penang
- In office 1 May 2021 – 30 April 2025
- Chief Minister: Chow Kon Yeow
- Preceded by: Abdul Rahman Abbas
- Succeeded by: Ramli Ngah Talib

Secretary-General of the Ministry of Foreign Affairs
- In office 4 July 2001 – 7 January 2006
- Preceded by: Abdul Kadir Mohamad
- Succeeded by: Rastam Mohd Isa

7th High Commissioner of Malaysia to Bangladesh
- In office 10 June 1992 – December 1994
- Preceded by: Tunku Nazihah Tunku Mohd Rus
- Succeeded by: Mahyuddin Abdul Rahman

Personal details
- Born: Ahmad Fuzi bin Abdul Razak; 8 January 1949 (age 77) Sungai Bakap, Penang, Federation of Malaya (now Malaysia)
- Spouse: Khadijah Mohd Nor
- Children: 2
- Education: Bukit Mertajam High School
- Alma mater: University of Malaya (BA)
- Occupation: Civil servant

Ahmad Fuzi bin Abdul Razak (Jawi: أحمد فوزي بن عبدالرزاق; born 8 January 1949) is a Malaysian diplomat who served as the 8th Governor of Penang from May 2021 to April 2025.

== Early life and education ==
Ahmad Fuzi was born at Sungai Bakap, Penang, Federation of Malaya (now Malaysia). He had his primary education at King Edward VII School in Taiping and Stowell School Bukit Mertajam, secondary education at the Bukit Mertajam High School, higher secondary education at the Anderson School, Ipoh before graduating from the University of Malaya (UM) in 1972 with a Bachelor of Arts (Hons). He also attended the UK Foreign Service Programme at Oxford University where he obtained a Certificate in Diplomacy in 1974.

== Civil service ==
Ahmad Fuzi joined Malaysian Administrative and Diplomatic Service in 1972 as an assistant secretary in the Ministry of Foreign Affairs. Throughout the years, he served as a diplomat in Moscow, The Hague, Canberra and Washington, D.C. He headed the Malaysian High Commission in Dhaka from 1992 to 1994. He served as Deputy Secretary-General from 1997 to 2001, as Secretary-General until 2006 and as Ambassador-at-Large until 2009.

As Secretary-General, he played a prominent role in organizing the NAM Summit and the OIC Summit, both in 2003, and the ASEAN Summit and related summits in 2005. He also led Malaysian delegation to the ASEAN Senior Officials Meeting and the Senior Officials Meeting of the bilateral Joint Commissions between Malaysia and the relevant countries.

== Business and economic career ==
After leaving public service, Ahmad Fuzi has served as chairman and director in various companies, including ACE Holdings Berhad, ACE Investment Bank Limited, Takaful Malaysia Berhad, asiaEP Resources Berhad, Seremban Engineering Berhad, Puncak Niaga Holdings Berhad and Maybank Islamic Berhad.

Ahmad Fuzi has also been Secretary-General of WIEF from 2008. As such, he was known for the success of WIEF forums all over the world such as London, Dubai, Islamabad, Kuwait, Astana, Jakarta, with the last WIEF Forum held in Kuching in 2017 and the only WIEF Roundtable Series held in Kota Kinabalu in 2020.

== Yang di-Pertua Negeri of Penang (2021–2025) ==
Penang Chief Minister Chow Kon Yeow, on His Majesty's behalf, declared Ahmad Fuzi's appointment as the next Governor on 12 April 2021. He took the governorship from his predecessor, Abdul Rahman Abbas, upon his swearing in on 1 May 2021.

== Personal life ==
Ahmad Fuzi is married to Khadijah Mohd Nor and they have two children.

== Honours ==
=== Honours of Malaysia ===
- Malaysia
  - Grand Commander of the Order of the Defender of the Realm (SMN) – Tun (2021)
  - Commander of the Order of Loyalty to the Crown of Malaysia (PSM) – Tan Sri (2003)
  - Companion of the Order of Loyalty to the Crown of Malaysia (JSM) (1999)
  - Member of the Order of the Defender of the Realm (AMN) (1979)
  - Recipient of the Active Service Medal (PKB)
  - Recipient of the General Service Medal (PPA)
  - Recipient of the 12th Yang di-Pertuan Agong Installation Medal
  - Recipient of the 16th Yang di-Pertuan Agong Installation Medal
  - Recipient of the 17th Yang di-Pertuan Agong Installation Medal
- Penang
  - Grand Principal of the Order of the Defender of State (DUPN) – Dato' Seri Utama (2021)
  - Companion of the Order of the Defender of State (DMPN) – Dato' (2002)
  - Lieutenant of the Order of the Defender of State (DSPN) – Dato' (1999)
- Sabah
  - Grand Commander of the Order of Kinabalu (SPDK) – Datuk Seri Panglima (2021)
- Perlis
  - Recipient of Tuanku Syed Sirajuddin Jamalullail Silver Jubilee Medal (2025)

=== Foreign honour ===
- Brunei
  - Commander of the Order of Paduka Seri Laila Jasa (DSLJ) – Dato Seri Laila Jasa (2014)
