= Teoh Teik Huat =

Malaysian politician (1946/1947–2024)

- 张德发

Chairmen of Penang of Democratic Action Party

Member of the Malaysian Parliament for Bagan
- In office 1986–1990
- Preceded by: Tan Cheng Bee (BN–MCA)
- Succeeded by: Lim Hock Seng (GR–DAP)
- Majority: 4,601 (1986)

Member of the Penang State Legislative Assembly for Pengkalan Kota
- In office 1982–1990
- Preceded by: Lim Kean Siew (BN–MCA)
- Succeeded by: Chow Kon Yeow (GR–DAP)
- Majority: 616 (1982)

Member of the Penang State Legislative Assembly for Paya Terubong
- In office 1990–1995
- Preceded by: Chin Nyok Soo (BN–MCA)
- Succeeded by: Loh Hock Hun (BN–MCA)
- Majority: 918 (1990)

Personal details
- Died: 15 July 2024 Perth, Australia
- Party: Democratic Action Party (DAP) (–2001); Parti Keadilan Nasional (keADILan) (2001–2003); Parti Keadilan Rakyat (PKR) (2003–2024)
- Other political affiliations: Gagasan Rakyat (GR) (1990–1995); Barisan Alternatif (BA) (1999–2004); Pakatan Rakyat (PR) (2008–2015); Pakatan Harapan (PH) (2015–2024)
- Occupation: Politician

Teoh Teik Huat (1946/1947 – 15 July 2024) was a Malaysian politician. He represented the Democratic Action Party (DAP) at the state and federal levels and was its chairman in Penang. He later joined the People's Justice Party with a number of DAP members.

== Career ==
Teoh represented Bagan in the Dewan Rakyat from 1986 to 1990, and was state assemblyman for Pengkalan Kota from 1982 to 1990 and Paya Terubong from 1990 to 1995.

He was leader of the state chapter at the time that DAP made a serious bid to take over the Penang state government at the 1990 Malaysian elections. For that campaign, dubbed Tanjong 2, the party formed an alliance with the Umno splinter party Semangat 46 as part of the Gagasan Rakyat coalition. However, even though party chief Lim Kit Siang defeated incumbent Chief Minister Lim Chong Eu in Padang Kota, DAP only narrowly failed to win the election, securing 14 out of the state's 33 seats.

Teoh fell out with other DAP leaders in 1998, and joined fellow opposition party Parti Keadilan Nasional, later known as Parti Keadilan Rakyat with a number of DAP members.

== Retirement and death ==
Teoh died from complications from surgery in Perth, Australia, on 15 July 2024, at the age of 77.

== Election results ==
Penang State Legislative Assembly
Year	Constituency	Candidate	Votes	Pct	Opponent(s)	Votes	Pct	Ballots cast	Majority	Turnout
1980	N23 Pengkalan Kota	Teoh Teik Huat (DAP)	6,285	N/A	Lim Kean Siew (MCA)	6,839	%	N/A	554	N/A
1980	N23 Pengkalan Kota	Teoh Teik Huat (DAP)	6,285	N/A	Lim Ewe Chin (IND)	N/A	N/A	N/A	554	N/A
1980	N23 Pengkalan Kota	Teoh Teik Huat (DAP)	6,285	N/A	Tan Kee Chey (IND)	N/A	N/A	N/A	554	N/A
1982	N23 Pengkalan Kota	Teoh Teik Huat (DAP)	9,213	51.73%	Lim Kean Siew (MCA)	8,597	48.27%	18,115	616	80.59%
1986	N23 Pengkalan Kota	Teoh Teik Huat (DAP)	10,862	58.56%	Loh Hock Hun (MCA)	7,688	41.44%	18,918	3,174	78.55%
1990	N29 Paya Terubong	Teoh Teik Huat (DAP)	8,921	52.71%	Chin Nyok Soo (MCA)	8,003	47.29%	16,924	918	77.45%
1995	N29 Paya Terubong	Teoh Teik Huat (DAP)	9,081	40.69%	Loh Hock Hun (MCA)	13,097	58.69%	22,316	4,016	79.25%
1995	N29 Paya Terubong	Teoh Teik Huat (DAP)	9,081	40.69%	Selvaraja Somiah David Somiah (PBS)	138	0.62%	22,316	4,016	79.25%

Parliament of Malaysia
Year	Constituency	Candidate	Votes	Pct	Opponent(s)	Votes	Pct	Ballots cast	Majority	Turnout
1986	P043 Bagan	Teoh Teik Huat (DAP)	21,759	55.91%	Chaw Chek Sam (MCA)	17,158	44.09%	38,917	4,601	72.31%
1995	P045 Bukit Mertajam	Teoh Teik Huat (DAP)	18,077	37.46%	Tan Chong Keng (MCA)	30,175	62.54%	49,659	12,098	78.51%
