= Kiamsam =

Town in Labuan, Malaysia

Kiamsam is a small coastal town in Federal Territory of Labuan, Malaysia. The Universiti Malaysia Sabah International Campus is located here.
