= Lau Keng Ee =

Malaysian politician

- 刘敬亿

Member of the Penang State Legislative Assembly for Pengkalan Kota
- In office 8 March 2008 – 9 May 2018
- Preceded by: Lee Hack Teik (BN–MCA)
- Succeeded by: Daniel Gooi Zi Sen (PH–DAP)
- Majority: 5,477 (2008); 13,600 (2013)

Personal details
- Party: Democratic Action Party (DAP)
- Other political affiliations: Pakatan Rakyat (PR) (2008–2015); Pakatan Harapan (PH) (2015–present)
- Occupation: Politician

Lau Keng Ee is a Malaysian politician who served as the Political Secretary to the Chief Minister of Penang Chow Kon Yeow since August 2023. He served as the Member of the Penang State Legislative Assembly (MLA) for Pengkalan Kota from March 2008 to May 2018. He is a Democratic Action Party (DAP), a component party of Pakatan Harapan (PH), formerly Pakatan Rakyat (PR) coalitions.

== Election results ==
Penang State Legislative Assembly
Year	Constituency	Candidate	Votes	Pct	Opponent(s)	Votes	Pct	Ballots cast	Majority	Turnout
2004	N24 Kebun Bunga	Lau Keng Ee (DAP)	5,087	39.17%	Quah Kooi Heong (Gerakan)	8,285	60.83%	13,612	3,198	72.21%
2008	N27 Pengkalan Kota	Lau Keng Ee (DAP)	10,185	68.40%	Lee Hack Teik (MCA)	4,708	31.60%	15,090	5,477	77.40%
2013	N27 Pengkalan Kota	Lau Keng Ee (DAP)	15,403	89.50%	Loke Poh Chye (MCA)	1,803	10.50%	17,462	13,600	87.40%
