= Mohd Noh Dalimin =

Malay academic

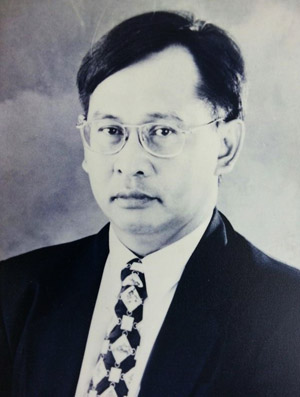
- Professor Dato Dr. Mohd Noh Dalimin
- Born: March 18, 1952; Parit Raja Batu Pahat, Johor, Malaysia
- Citizenship: Malaysian
- Spouse: Maryati Mohamed

Academic background
- Education: Imperial College London
- Thesis: (1981)

Mohd Noh Dalimin is a Malay academic. He is the second Vice-Chancellor of Universiti Tun Hussein Onn Malaysia (UTHM), from October, 2008 until October 2016 replacing Ismail Hj. Bakar. Prior to that, he was the Vice-Chancellor of University Malaysia Sabah (UMS) between 2005 and 2008, and a Deputy Vice-Chancellor between 1998 and 2005, in the same university.

Mohd Noh is married to Maryati Mohamed, an entomologist, and they have seven children.

== Career ==
Mohd Noh started his career as a lecturer in Physics in Universiti Kebangsaan Malaysia in 1981 after completing his studies in Imperial College, London. In 1992, he was appointed as Deputy Dean, Faculty of Science and Natural Resources of the same university, before joining as Foundation Dean and Professor of Physics, School of Science and Technology, Universiti Malaysia Sabah, in 1995.

Mohd Noh was chairman for the Malaysia Section of ISES (International Solar Energy Society) a UN accredited NGO. He is also currently the Chairman of the Malaysian Examinations Syndicate (Majlis Peperiksaan Malaysia) as well as the National Chairman of the Malaysian Technical University Networks (MTUN).

== Education ==
Mohd Noh received his early education in his home town, Batu Pahat; Primary education in Pintas Raya Primary school, and Limpoon Primary English School, and Secondary education in Sultan Sulaiman English School and High School Batu Pahat. He is a graduate in Physics from Gadjah Mada University, a Master of Science in Solid State Physics from Bedford College, University of London, and has a PhD in experimental Solid State Physics, from Imperial College London.

== Expert area ==
His research interest is in experimental solid state physics and materials, solar renewable energy and environmental sciences, and community engagement.
