= Daniel Gooi Zi Sen =

Malaysian politician

Yang Berhormat Tuan Daniel Gooi Zi Sen MLA
- 魏子森
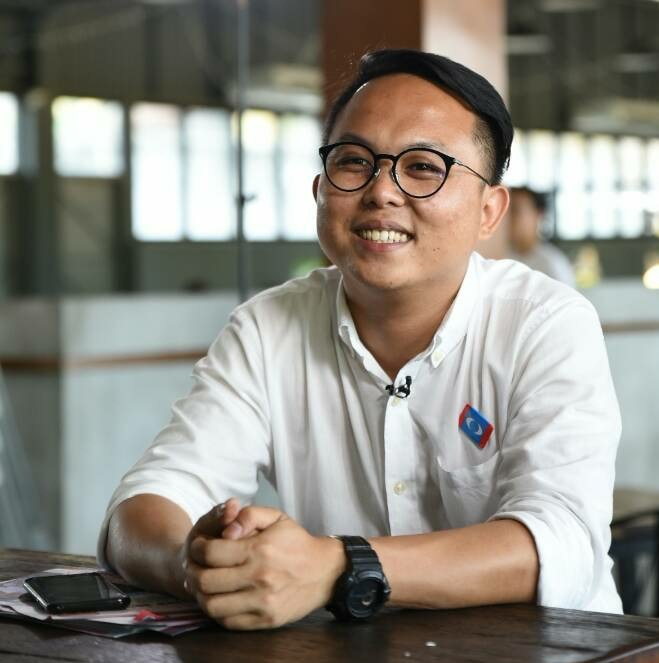

Member of the Penang State Executive Council (Youth, Sports and Health)
- Incumbent
- Assumed office 16 August 2023
- Governor: Ahmad Fuzi Abdul Razak (2023–2025); Ramli Ngah Talib (since 2025)
- Chief Minister: Chow Kon Yeow
- Preceded by: Soon Lip Chee (Youth and Sports); Norlela Ariffin (Health)
- Constituency: Padang Lalang

Member of the Penang State Legislative Assembly for Padang Lalang
- Incumbent
- Assumed office 12 August 2023
- Preceded by: Chong Eng (PH–DAP)
- Majority: 19,448 (2023)

Member of the Penang State Legislative Assembly for Pengkalan Kota
- In office 9 May 2018 – 12 August 2023
- Preceded by: Lau Keng Ee (PR–DAP)
- Succeeded by: Wong Yuee Harng (PH–DAP)
- Majority: 13,390 (2018)

Personal details
- Born: Daniel Gooi Zi Sen; 11 June 1987 (age 39) Bukit Mertajam, Penang
- Citizenship: Malaysian
- Party: Democratic Action Party (DAP)
- Other political affiliations: Pakatan Harapan (PH)
- Relations: Gooi Seong Kin (uncle)
- Parent(s): Gooi Seong Sin; Hong Lai Chan
- Education: Universiti Malaysia Sabah
- Occupation: Politician

Daniel Gooi Zi Sen (Chinese: 魏子森; Jyutping: Ngai6 Zi2 Sam1; Pe̍h-ōe-jī: Gūi Chú-sim; born on 11 June 1987) is a Malaysian politician who has served as Member of the Penang State Executive Council (EXCO) in the Pakatan Harapan (PH) state administration under Chief Minister Chow Kon Yeow and Member of the Penang State Legislative Assembly (MLA) for Padang Lalang since August 2023. He served as the MLA for Pengkalan Kota from May 2018 to August 2023. He is a member and Branch Chief of Chemor Lane of the Democratic Action Party (DAP), a component party of the Pakatan Harapan (PH) coalition. He was also the youngest candidate in the 2018 Penang state election.

== Background ==
Gooi was born on 11 June 1987 in Bukit Mertajam, Penang. His father is Gooi Seong Sin and mother is Hong Lai Chan. His uncle, Gooi Seong Kin, currently special coordinator for the Chief Minister of Penang, represented DAP to contest in the 1995 Malaysian general election for the Berapit state seat. He studied in SJK (C) Kim Sen and Jit Sin High School. He has also studied Tourism Management in Universiti Malaysia Sabah.

== Political career ==
Gooi's uncle, Gooi Seong Kin had used their house as his campaign center in the 1995 Malaysian general election and Gooi admires Lim Kit Siang since he was young. After he graduated from Universiti Malaysia Sabah in 2009, he joined DAP in 2010 and served as by-then Penang State Executive Councilor for Tourism, Law Heng Kiang's office. He was the project planner for DAP Penang from 2012 to 2013. After the 2013 Malaysian general election, he was the special officer for the Penang State Executive Councilor for Housing, Jagdeep Singh Deo.

In 2018 Malaysian general election, he was filled to contest the Pengkalan Kota seat as DAP's youngest candidate in the general election under the flag of PKR. He successfully defeated the other candidates and became the Member of Penang State Legislative Assembly for Pengkalan Kota.

== Election results ==
Penang State Legislative Assembly
Year	Constituency	Candidate	Votes	Pct	Opponent(s)	Votes	Pct	Ballots cast	Majority	Turnout
2018	N27 Pengkalan Kota	Daniel Gooi Zi Sen (DAP)	15,037	87.87%	Lim Swee Bok (MCA)	1,647	9.62%	17,112	13,390	85.27%
2018	N27 Pengkalan Kota	Daniel Gooi Zi Sen (DAP)	15,037	87.87%	Ragindran Sivasamy (IND)	87	0.51%	17,112	13,390	85.27%
2018	N27 Pengkalan Kota	Daniel Gooi Zi Sen (DAP)	15,037	87.87%	Koay Teng Lye (MUP)	83	0.49%	17,112	13,390	85.27%
2018	N27 Pengkalan Kota	Daniel Gooi Zi Sen (DAP)	15,037	87.87%	Chew Seng Tung (PRM)	68	0.40%	17,112	13,390	85.27%
2023	N15 Padang Lalang	Daniel Gooi Zi Sen (DAP)	22,315	87.85%	Suresh Deravaj Naidu (BERSATU)	2,867	11.29%	25,400	19,448	70.55%
2023	N15 Padang Lalang	Daniel Gooi Zi Sen (DAP)	22,315	87.85%	Patrick Ooi Khar Giap (PFP)	218	0.86%	25,400	19,448	70.55%
