= Institute for Tropical Biology and Conservation =

Malaysian research institute

- Other name: IBTP
- Parent institution: Universiti Malaysia Sabah
- Founder: Prof. Dr. Maryati Mohamed
- Established: 1996
- Location: Kota Kinabalu, Sabah, Malaysia
- Coordinates: 6.0386°N 116.1153°E
- Interactive map of Institute for Tropical Biology and Conservation

The Institute for Tropical Biology and Conservation (ITBC), in Bahasa Malaysia: Institut Biologi Tropika dan Pemuliharaan (IBTP) is a research institute of Universiti Malaysia Sabah in Kota Kinabalu, Sabah, Malaysia. Founded in 1996, its objectives have been to promote and carry out research on the biodiversity of tropical flora and fauna, especially of the Malaysian state of Sabah, and to build resources that facilitate this, such as technical laboratories for DNA analysis, organic chemistry, and microscopy, and the "Borneensis" natural history collection focusing on native flora and fauna. The institute has had three directors: the founding director, entomologist Prof. Dr. Maryati Mohamed (1996–2008), zoologist Prof. Dr. Abdul Hamid Ahmad (2008–2012), and the current director, organic chemist Prof. Dr. Charles S. Vairappan. ITBC publishes the open-access, online Journal of Tropical Biology and Conservation.
