= Lim Kean Siew =

Malaysian politician (1922–2007)

- 林建寿

Member of the Malaysian Parliament for Dato' Kramat
- In office 19 August 1959 – 1 January 1969
- Preceded by: Constituency established
- Succeeded by: V. David (Gerakan)
- Majority: 5,426 (1959); 1,866 (1964)

Member of the Penang State Legislative Assembly for Air Itam
- Preceded by: Chor Sin Kheng
- Succeeded by: Tan Phock Kin (GERAKAN)
- Majority: 153 (1965)

Member of the Penang State Legislative Assembly for Pengkalan Kota
- Preceded by: Chooi Yew Choy
- Succeeded by: Teoh Teik Huat (DAP)
- Majority: 554 (1980)

Faction represented in Dewan Rakyat
- 1959-1969: Labour Party of Malaya
- 1959-1969: Malayan Peoples' Socialist Front

Personal details
- Born: Lim Kean Siew; 5 June 1922 Penang, Straits Settlement
- Died: 30 September 2007 (aged 85) Penang, Malaysia
- Party: Labour Party of Malaya (LPM) (1959-1972); Malaysian Chinese Association (MCA) (1975–1984)
- Other political affiliations: Malayan Peoples' Socialist Front (SF) (1959–1966); Barisan Nasional (BN) (1975–1984)
- Spouse: Pamela Ong
- Children: 4
- Education: University of Cambridge (LL.M)
- Alma mater: Penang Free School; Raffles College
- Occupation: Politician, lawyer

Lim Kean Siew (5 June 1922 - 30 September 2007) was a former politician and lawyer who served as secretary–general and the chairman of the Labour Party of Malaya and a leader of the Malaysian opposition Socialist Front coalition in the 1960s.

He was an elected MP for the Dato Kramat constituency in 1959 and 1964 under the Socialist Front banner. He later joined the MCA in 1975 as a presidential adviser, and was Pengkalan Kota assemblyman from 1980 to 1982.

Kean Siew came from a family of lawyers who were also left-wing politicians. His brother was constitutional expert Lim Kean Chye who founded the Malayan Democratic Union, while his sister Datuk P.G. Lim was a Labour Party candidate who later served as ambassador. Their father, Cheng Ean, was also a noted barrister and a legislative councillor in the 1930s.

== Early life ==
His grandfather Phuah Hin Leong, who also used the family name Lim was a migrant from China who came to Penang and became a highly successful rice miller and landowner. Kean Siew's father Lim Cheng Ean studied law in Cambridge where he met and married a Chinese lady from British Guiana named Rosaline Hoalim. Their marriage produced five sons and three daughters.

Lim Kean Siew was born on June 5, 1922. He attended Penang Free School and then Raffles College in Singapore, before going on to excel at Cambridge, getting firsts in English Literature and English History and a Masters in Law. He then qualified as a barrister from the Honourable Society of Gray's Inn.

His siblings included Lim Phaik Gan, known as P. G. Lim, Lim Kean Chye and another brother Lim Kean Chong, who fought as an RAF pilot in the Battle of Britain and served in Tanzania as chief of the Department of Roads. His life is documented in the book My Life: Chronicles of a Wartime Pilot and Other Stories By Lim Kean Chong.

Lim Cheng Ean was known for walking out of the Legislative Council in protest of the British colonial government's refusal to fund Chinese and Tamil vernacular education.

== Career ==
Lim Kean Siew was admitted to the Malaysian Bar on Jan 22, 1954. Soon after he was elected as a George Town councillor in Penang in 1957 under the Socialist Front.

In the first elections after independence, he contested Dato' Keramat and won by a convincing 5,426 margin defeating Lee Thean Chew of the Alliance. He was one of eight Socialist Front MPs elected.

However, by the 1964 elections, the party had been decimated by detentions and he and Tan Chee Khoon were the only two elected. He retained Dato' Keramat with a reduced majority of 1,866 votes, defeating Teh Ewe Lim of the United Democratic Party and Lim Cheng Poh of Alliance in a hotly contested three-way race.

In 1965, he also won the Ayer Itam Penang state by-election called after the death of the Alliance incumbent Chor Sin Kheng. He went to become chairman of the Labour Party as well as chairman of the Socialist Front coalition.

Eventually the detentions, the infiltration of left-wing extremists and the dissolution of the Socialist Front led to many Labour Party of Malaya leaders forming Gerakan in 1968, but Lim Kean Siew stayed with the party until it folded in 1972. He then joined the Malaysian Chinese Association (MCA) and was appointed chairman of the Penang chapter by then MCA president Lee San Choon from 1979 to 1984.

He won the Pengkalan Kota state seat in the 1980 by–election that followed the death of incumbent CY Choy. The defeated DAP candidate Teoh Teik Huat filed an election petition claiming that a campaign speech by finance minister Tengku Razaleigh Hamzah was an offence under the Election Offences Act 1954. The court action was defeated.

Lim eventually stepped away from politics and focussed on his legal practice at Lim Kean Siew and Company, a law firm he founded.

He also became an author. Among his books are Inner Peace: Source of Chinese Philosophic Meditative Practice (1995), The Eye over the Golden Sands: The Memoirs of a Penang Family (1997), Blood on the Golden Sands: The Memoirs of a Penang Family (1999) and The Beauty of Chinese Yixing Teapots: And the Finer Arts of Tea Drinking (2001).

== Death ==
He died at a private hospital on September 30, 2007 of heart failure. He was survived by his wife Pamela Ong, three sons and a daughter.

== Election results ==
Parliament of the Federation of Malaya
Year	Constituency	Candidate	Votes	Pct	Opponent(s)	Votes	Pct	Ballots cast	Majority	Turnout
1959	P037 Dato' Kramat	Lim Kean Siew (Lab)	10,474	66.26%	Lee Thean Chew (MCA)	5,048	31.93%	15,808	5,426	72.13%
1959	P037 Dato' Kramat	Lim Kean Siew (Lab)	10,474	66.26%	C. M. Ramli (IND)	286	1.81%	15,808	5,426	72.13%

Parliament of Malaysia
Year	Constituency	Candidate	Votes	Pct	Opponent(s)	Votes	Pct	Ballots cast	Majority	Turnout
1964	P037 Dato' Kramat	Lim Kean Siew (Lab)	10,102	38.79%	Lim Cheng Poh (MCA)	7,707	29.59%	26,045	1,866	85.23%
1964	P037 Dato' Kramat	Lim Kean Siew (Lab)	10,102	38.79%	Teh Ewe Lim (UDP)	8,236	31.62%	26,045	1,866	85.23%

Penang State Legislative Assembly
Year	Constituency	Candidate	Votes	Pct	Opponent(s)	Votes	Pct	Ballots cast	Majority	Turnout
1964	N11 Ayer Itam	Lim Kean Siew (Lab)	3,358	41.74%	Chor Sing Keng (MCA)	3,485	43.32%	8,195	127	85.29%
1964	N11 Ayer Itam	Lim Kean Siew (Lab)	3,358	41.74%	Toh Boon Kooi (UDP)	1,202	14.94%	8,195	127	85.29%
1965	N11 Ayer Itam	Lim Kean Siew (Lab)	2,836	35.53%	Tan Gim Hwa (UDP)	2,683	33.61%	NA	153	78.37%
1965	N11 Ayer Itam	Lim Kean Siew (Lab)	2,836	35.53%	David Choong (MCA)	2,463	30.86%	NA	153	78.37%
1980	N23 Pengkalan Kota	Lim Kean Siew (MCA)	6,839	%	Teoh Teik Huat (DAP)	6,285	%	NA	554	NA
1980	N23 Pengkalan Kota	Lim Kean Siew (MCA)	6,839	%	Lim Ewe Chin (IND)	NA	%	NA	554	NA
1980	N23 Pengkalan Kota	Lim Kean Siew (MCA)	6,839	%	Tan Kee Chey (IND)	NA	%	NA	554	NA
1982	N23 Pengkalan Kota	Lim Kean Siew (MCA)	8,597	48.27%	Teoh Teik Huat (DAP)	9,213	51.73%	18,115	616	80.59%
