= Wong Yuee Harng =

Malaysian politician

Yang Berhormat Tuan Wong Yuee Harng MLA
- 王宇航
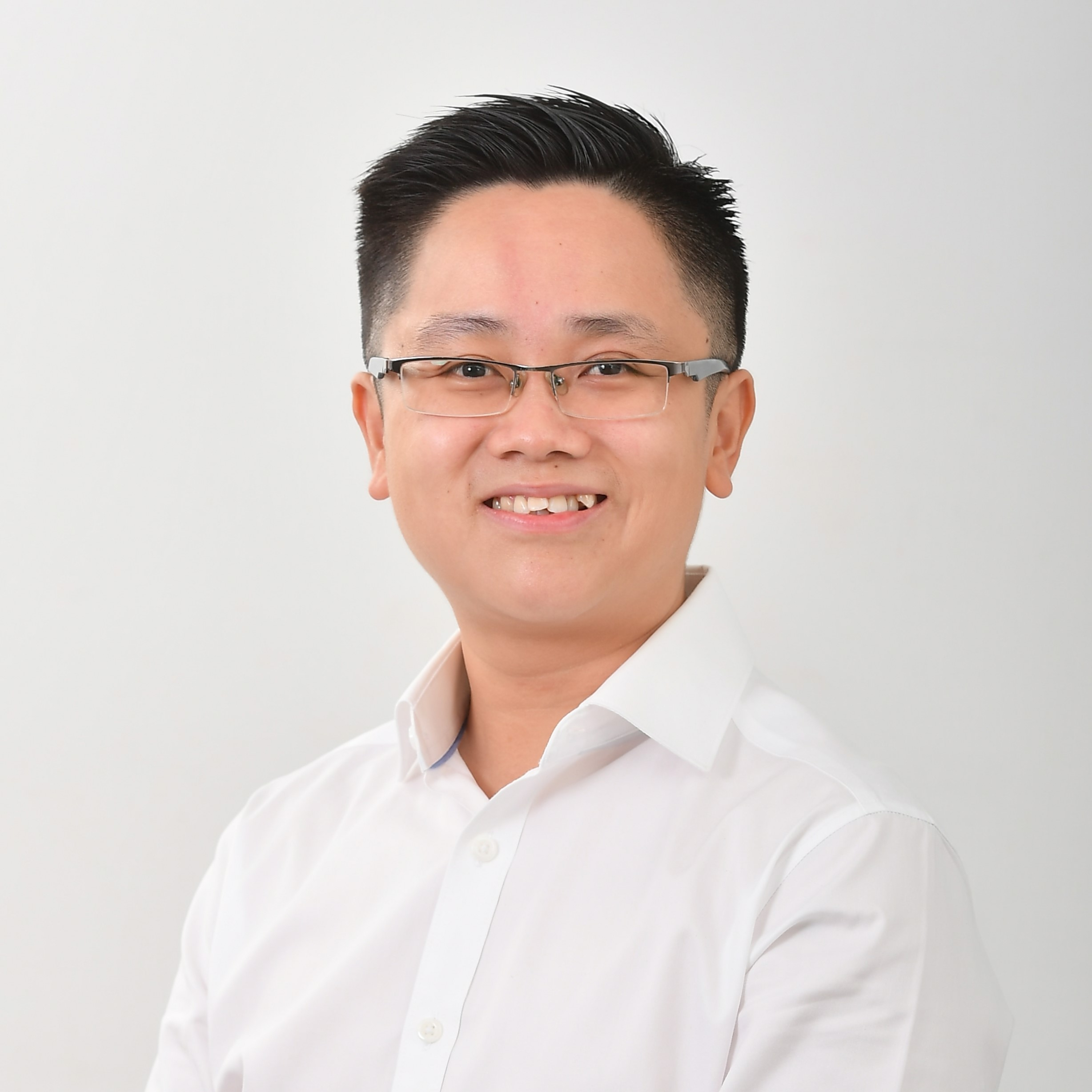

Member of the Penang State Legislative Assembly for Pengkalan Kota
- Incumbent
- Assumed office 12 August 2023
- Preceded by: Daniel Gooi Zi Sen (PH–DAP)
- Majority: 14,076 (2023)

Personal details
- Born: Wong Yuee Harng; 5 October 1988 (age 37) Malaysia
- Citizenship: Malaysian
- Party: Democratic Action Party (DAP) (since 2012)
- Other political affiliations: Pakatan Rakyat (PR) (2012–2015); Pakatan Harapan (PH) (since 2015)
- Occupation: Politician

Wong Yuee Harng (born 5 October 1988) is a Malaysian politician who has served as Member of the Penang State Legislative Assembly (MLA) for Pengkalan Kota since August 2023. He is a member of the Democratic Action Party (DAP), a component party of the Pakatan Harapan (PH) coalition.

== Political career ==
Wong joined DAP in 2012. He has served in the Penang Island City Council for 8 years before being nominated to contest in the 2023 Penang state election. He is currently the Treasurer and Chief of Youth Wing of DAP Tanjong division.

== Election result ==
Penang State Legislative Assembly
Year	Constituency	Candidate	Votes	Pct	Opponent(s)	Votes	Pct	Ballots cast	Majority	Turnout
2023	N27 Pengkalan Kota	Wong Yuee Harng (DAP)	14,921	94.60%	Suthakaran Subramaniam (Gerakan)	845	5.40%	15,892	14,076	73.68%
