= Joseph Ng Soon Siang =

Malaysian politician

Yang Berhormat Tuan Joseph Ng Soon Siang MLA
- 黄顺祥

Member of the Penang State Legislative Assembly for Air Itam
- Incumbent
- Assumed office 9 May 2018
- Preceded by: Wong Hon Wai (PR–DAP)
- Majority: 9,541 (2018); 9,185 (2023)

Personal details
- Born: Joseph Ng Soon Siang; 10 April 1979 (age 47) Malaysia
- Citizenship: Malaysian
- Party: Democratic Action Party (DAP)
- Other political affiliations: Pakatan Harapan (PH)
- Occupation: Politician

Joseph Ng Soon Siang

Chinese name
- Traditional Chinese: 黃順祥
- Simplified Chinese: 黄顺祥
Transcriptions
Standard Mandarin
- Hanyu Pinyin: Huáng Shùnxiáng

Joseph Ng Soon Siang (simplified Chinese: 黄顺祥; traditional Chinese: 黃順祥; pinyin: Huáng Shùnxiáng; born 10 April 1979) is a Malaysian politician who has served as Member of the Penang State Legislative Assembly (MLA) for Air Itam since May 2018. He is a member of the Democratic Action Party (DAP), a component party of the Pakatan Harapan (PH) coalition.

== Election results ==
Penang State Legislative Assembly
Year	Constituency	Candidate	Votes	Pct.	Opponent(s)	Votes	Pct.	Ballots cast	Majority	Turnout
2018	N33 Air Itam	Joseph Ng Soon Siang (DAP)	12,588	79.80%	Tan Kah Leong (Gerakan)	3,047	19.30%	15,988	9,541	81.50%
2018	N33 Air Itam	Joseph Ng Soon Siang (DAP)	12,588	79.80%	Kang Teik Woi (MUP)	148	0.90%	15,988	9,541	81.50%
2023	N33 Air Itam	Joseph Ng Soon Siang (DAP)	12,456	79.20%	Cheang Chee Gooi (GERAKAN)	3,267	20.80%	15,873	9,185	68.76%
