= 1965 Ayer Itam by-election =

← 1964	7 November 1965	1969 →

Ayer Itam seat in Penang State Legislative Assembly
- Turnout: 8,023
	SF	All	UDP
Candidate	Lim Kean Siew	David Choong	Tan Gim Hwa
Party	Lab	MCA	UDP
Alliance	SF	Alliance
Popular vote	2,836	2,463	2,683
Percentage	35.35%	30.70%	33.44%
MLA before election
Chor Sin Kheng
Alliance (MCA)
Elected MLA
Lim Kean Siew
SF (Labour)

The Ayer Itam by-election was a state assembly by-election that was held on 7 November 1965 in the state of Penang, Malaysia. The Ayer Itam seat fell vacant following the death of its MCA MLA Mr. Chor Sin Kheng Chor won the seat in 1964 Malaysian general election.

Lim Kean Siew of Socialist Front, won the by election, defeating David Choong of Alliance and Tan Gim Hwa of UDP with a slim majority of 153 votes.

== Nomination ==
Prior nomination, Socialist Front have difficulty in finding a willing candidate. Lim Kean Siew initially declined to work pressure. Other possible nominees is party Publicity Chairmen, Ooi Thiam Siew and Mayor of Penang Island, Choy Chooi Yew.

On nomination day, three candidates were confirmed. Alliance nominated MCA Youth national vice-chairmen, David Choong. Socialist Front nominated its Secretary General, Lim Kean Siew. UDP nominated accountant, Tan Gim Hwa.

== Results ==
Malaysian general by-election, 7 November 1965: Ayer Itam Upon the death of incumbent, Chor Sin Kheng
Party	Candidate	Votes	%	∆%
Socialist Front	Lim Kean Siew	2,836	35.35	
Alliance	David Choong	2,463	30.70	
UDP	Tan Gim Hwa	2,683	33.44	
Total valid votes		7,982	99.49	
Total rejected ballots		41	0.51	
Unreturned ballots		0		
Turnout		8,023	78.37	
Registered electors		10,237		
Majority		153	NA	NA
Socialist Front gain		Swing		
