= Dato' Kramat (federal constituency) =

Malaysian Federal Constituency

Penang constituency

Defunct federal constituency
- Legislature: Dewan Rakyat
- Constituency created: 1958
- Constituency abolished: 1974
- First contested: 1959
- Last contested: 1969

Dato' Kramat was a federal constituency in Penang, Malaysia, that was represented in the Dewan Rakyat from 1959 to 1974.

The federal constituency was created in the 1974 redistribution and was mandated to return a single member to the Dewan Rakyat under the first past the post voting system.

== History ==
It was abolished in 1974 when it was redistributed.

=== Representation history ===
Members of Parliament for Dato' Kramat
Parliament	No	Years	Member	Party	Vote Share
Constituency created from George Town
Parliament of the Federation of Malaya
1st	P037	1959–1963	Lim Kean Siew (林建寿)	SF (Lab)	10,474; 66.26%
Parliament of Malaysia
1st	P037	1963–-1964	Lim Kean Siew (林建寿)	SF (Lab)	10,474; 66.26%
2nd	P037	1964–1969	Lim Kean Siew (林建寿)	SF (Lab)	10,102; 38.79%
		1969–1971	Parliament was suspended		
3rd	P037	1971–1972	V. David (வே. தேவிட்)	GERAKAN	17,272; 75.40%
3rd	P037	1972–1974	V. David (வே. தேவிட்)	PEKEMAS	17,272; 75.40%
Constituency abolished, split into Jelutong and Tanjong

=== State constituency ===
Parliamentary constituency	State constituency						
Parliamentary constituency	1955–1959*	1959–1974	1974–1986	1986–1995	1995–2004	2004–2018	2018–present
Dato Kramat		Sungei Pinang					
Dato Kramat		Tanjong Barat					
Dato Kramat		Tanjong Selatan					

=== Historical boundaries ===
State Constituency	Area
State Constituency	1959
Sungei Pinang	Jalan Bakau; Jalan Makloom; Jalan Pantai; Jalan Perak; Sungai Pinang
Tanjong Barat	Jalan Anson; Jalan Burma; Jalan Dato' Kramat; Jalan Macalister; Jalan Pinang
Tanjong Selatan	Jalan Bridge; Jalan Macallum; Jalan MacNair; Jalan Magazine; Weld Quey

== Election results ==
Malaysian general election, 1969
Party	Candidate	Votes	%	∆%
GERAKAN	V. David	17,272	75.40	▲75.40
Alliance	Lim Chong Hai	5,635	24.60	▼4.99
Total valid votes		22,907	100.00	
Total rejected ballots		1,048		
Unreturned ballots		0		
Turnout		23,955	77.14	▼8.09
Registered electors		31,053		
Majority		11,637	50.80	▲43.63
GERAKAN gain from Socialist Front		Swing		?
Source(s) Election Commission of Malaysia.

Malaysian general election, 1964
Party	Candidate	Votes	%	∆%
Socialist Front	Lim Kean Siew	10,102	38.79	▼27.47
UDP	Teh Ewe Lim	8,236	31.62	▲31.62
Alliance	Lim Cheng Poh	7,707	29.59	▼2.34
Total valid votes		26,045	100.00	
Total rejected ballots		656		
Unreturned ballots		0		
Turnout		26,701	85.23	▲13.10
Registered electors		31,327		
Majority		1,866	7.17	▼27.16
Socialist Front hold		Swing		

Malayan general election, 1959
Party	Candidate	Votes	%
Socialist Front	Lim Kean Siew	10,474	66.26
Alliance	Lee Thean Chew	5,048	31.93
Independent	C. M. Ramli	286	1.81
Total valid votes		15,808	100.00
Total rejected ballots		103	
Unreturned ballots		0	
Turnout		15,911	72.13
Registered electors		22,058	
Majority		5,426	34.33
This was a new constituency created.
Source(s): Berita Harian.; Singapore Free Press.
