= 1980 Pengkalan Kota by-election =

← 1978	15 November 1980	1982 →

Pengkalan Kota seat in Penang State Legislative Assembly
- Turnout: 14,800 (74.83%)
	BN	DAP	IND
Candidate	Lim Kean Siew	Teoh Teik Huat	Lim Ewe Chin
Party	MCA	DAP	Independent
Alliance	BN
Popular vote	6,839	6,285	1,503
Percentage	46.58%	42.80%	10.24%
	IND
Candidate	Tan Kee Chey
Party	Independent
Popular vote	56
Percentage	0.38%
Pengkalan Kota MLA before election
C Y Choy
Independent
Elected Pengkalan Kota MLA
Lim Kean Siew
BN (MCA)

The Pengkalan Kota by-election was a state assembly by-election that was held on 15 November 1980 in the state of Penang, Malaysia. The Pengkalan kota seat fell vacant following the death of its Independent MLA Mr. C Y Choy. Choy won the seat in 1978 Malaysian general election.

Lim Kean Siew of Barisan Nasional, won the by election, defeating Teoh Teik Huat of Democratic Action Party and 2 independent politician, Lim Ewe Chin and Tan Khee Chey with a majority of 554 votes. 85 percent of the voters are non-Malay and poor demographic.

== Nomination ==
Prior the nomination, at least 6 independent candidate express their intention to run. Social Democratic Party (Malaysia) also intend to nominate its Secretary General, Yeap Ghim Guan.

On nomination day, Barisan Nasional nominated Penang MCA chairman, Lim Kean Siew. Democratic Action Party nominated native-born Teoh Teik Huat instead of Goh Lim Earn. Assistant manager, Lim Eew Chin and businessman, Tan Kee Chey completed the nomination as Independent politician.

== Results ==
Malaysian general by-election, 15 November 1980: Pengkalan Kota Upon the death of incumbent, Mr. C Y Choy
Party	Candidate	Votes	%	∆%
BN	Lim Kean Siew	6,839	46.58	
DAP	Teoh Teik Huat	6,285	42.80	
Independent	Lim Ewe Chin	1,503	10.24	
Independent	Tan Kee Chey	56	0.38	
Total valid votes		14,683	100.00	
Total rejected ballots		117		
Unreturned ballots		0		
Turnout		14,800	74.83	
Registered electors		19,777		
Majority		554	NA	NA
BN gain from Independent		Swing	N/A	

== Legacy ==
The outcome of the election is hugely impactful to Democratic Action Party. The outcome lead to resignation of its Secretary General, Lim Kit Siang.

The defeated DAP candidate Teoh Teik Huat filed an election petition claiming that a campaign speech by finance minister Tengku Razaleigh Hamzah was an offence under the Election Offences Act 1954. The court action was defeated.
