= Air Itam (Penang state constituency) =

Air Itam (N33)
Penang constituency
- Air Itam (olive) on Penang

State constituency
- Legislature: Penang State Legislative Assembly
MLA
Joseph Ng Soon Siang
PH
- Constituency created: 1959 (as Ayer Itam)
- First contested: 1959
- Last contested: 2023

Demographics
- Electors (2023): 23,085
- Area (km²): 3

Air Itam is a state constituency in Penang, Malaysia, that has been represented in the Penang State Legislative Assembly since 1959. It covers much of Air Itam, a western suburb of George Town.

The state constituency was first contested in 1959 and is mandated to return a single Assemblyman to the Penang State Legislative Assembly under the first-past-the-post voting system. Since 2018, the State Assemblyman for Air Itam is Joseph Ng Soon Seong from the Democratic Action Party (DAP), which is part of the state's ruling coalition, Pakatan Harapan (PH).

== Definition ==
=== Polling districts ===
According to the federal gazette issued on 18 July 2023, the Air Itam constituency is divided into 9 polling districts.

State constituency	Polling districts	Code	Location
Air Itam (N33)	Ayer Itam	051/33/01	SJK (C) Kong Min Cawangan Satu
Air Itam (N33)	Happy Valley	051/33/02	SJK (C) Chiao Nan
Air Itam (N33)	Jalan Kampong Pisang	051/33/03	SK Sri Aman
Air Itam (N33)	Kampong Melayu	051/33/04	SK Ayer Itam
Air Itam (N33)	Jalan Chor Sin Kheng	051/33/05	SM Chung Ling (Persendirian)
Air Itam (N33)	Thean Teik	051/33/06	SJK (C) Sin Kang
Air Itam (N33)	Zoo Road	051/33/07	SMJK Chung Ling
Air Itam (N33)	Jalan Shaik Madar	051/33/08	SMJK Chung Ling
Air Itam (N33)	Cheeseman Road	051/33/09	SMK Georgetown

This state seat comprises a large chunk of Air Itam, a suburb of George Town nestled in the central valleys of Penang Island. The 'old town', which contains the Air Itam Market and the Kek Lok Si Temple, is also situated within this constituency.

Air Itam Road forms the northern limits of the Air Itam constituency, with the portion of Air Itam north of the road falling under either Air Putih or Kebun Bunga constituencies. To the south, the Air Itam seat is partly bounded along the Dondang River; the portion of Air Itam south of the river, including Farlim, falls under the neighbouring Paya Terubong constituency. The Air Itam constituency also stretches up to Green Lane and Scotland Road to the east.

== Demographics ==
Ethnic breakdown of Air Itam's electorate as of 2023
1. Chinese (64.9%)
2. Malay (23.2%)
3. Indian (11.1%)
4. Other ethnicities (0.79%)

Total electors by polling district in 2016
Polling district	Electors
Ayer Itam	2,362
Cheeseman Road	1,291
Happy Valley	2,112
Jalan Chor Sin Kheng	2,178
Jalan Kampong Pisang	1,707
Jalan Shaik Madar	1,449
Kampong Melayu	3,133
Thean Teik	3,375
Zoo Road	1,292
Total	18,899
Source: Malaysian Election Commission

== History ==
The Air Itam state constituency was originally named Ayer Itam when it was formed prior to the 1959 State Elections. The seat was then given its present name in time for the 1995 State Election.

Since its formation in 1959, the Air Itam seat has experienced one by-election. The 1965 Ayer Itam by-election marked the first time an opposition party captured the constituency, as Lim Kean Siew from the Labour Party became the State Assemblyman for Ayer Itam until the 1969 State Election.

=== Representation history ===
Members of the Legislative Assembly for Air Itam
Assembly	No	Years	Member	Party
Constituency created
Ayer Itam
1st	N11	1959 – 1964	Chor Sin Kheng (邹新庆)	Alliance (MCA)
2nd	N11	1964 – 1965	Chor Sin Kheng (邹新庆)	Alliance (MCA)
2nd	N11	1965 – 1969	Lim Kean Siew (林建寿)	Socialist Front (Lab)
		1969 - 1971	Assembly dissolved	
3rd	N11	1971 – 1973	Tan Phock Kin (陈朴根)	Gerakan
3rd	N11	1973 – 1974	Tan Phock Kin (陈朴根)	BN (GERAKAN)
4th	N20	1974 – 1978	David Choong Ewe Leong (庄友良)	BN (MCA)
5th	N20	1978 – 1982	Peter Paul Dason	DAP
6th	N20	1982 – 1986	Lee Jong Ki (李永枢)	BN (MCA)
7th	N20	1986 – 1990	Gooi Hock Seng (魏福星)	DAP
8th	N20	1990 – 1995	Ong Hock Aun (王福安)	GR (DAP)
Air Itam
9th	N20	1995 – 1999	Lye Siew Weng (黎兆榮)	BN (MCA)
10th	N20	1999 – 2004	Lye Siew Weng (黎兆榮)	BN (MCA)
11th	N33	2004 – 2008	Cheang Chee Gooi (章志伟)	BN (Gerakan)
12th	N33	2008 – 2013	Wong Hon Wai (黄汉伟)	PR (DAP)
13th	N33	2013 – 2018	Wong Hon Wai (黄汉伟)	PR (DAP)
14th	N33	2018 – 2023	Joseph Ng Soon Siang (黄顺祥)	PH (DAP)
15th	N33	2023–present	Joseph Ng Soon Siang (黄顺祥)	PH (DAP)

== Election results ==
The electoral results for the Air Itam state constituency in 2008, 2013 and 2018 are as follows.

Penang state election, 2023
Party	Candidate	Votes	%	∆%
PH	Joseph Ng Soon Siang	12,456	79.20	▼0.60
PN	Cheang Chee Gooi	3,267	20.80	▲20.80
Total valid votes		15,723	100.00	
Total rejected ballots		124		
Unreturned ballots		26		
Turnout		15,873	68.76	▼12.74
Registered electors		23,085		
Majority		9,185	58.40	▼2.10
PH hold		Swing		

Penang state election, 2018
Party	Candidate	Votes	%	∆%
PKR	Joseph Ng Soon Siang	12,588	79.80	▲79.80
BN	Tan Kah Leong	3,047	19.30	▼6.80
BERSAMA	Kang Teik Woi	148	0.90	▲0.90
Total valid votes		15,783	100.00	
Total rejected ballots		151		
Unreturned ballots		54		
Turnout		15,988	81.50	▼2.80
Registered electors		19,622		
Majority		9,541	60.50	▲12.70
PKR hold		Swing		
Source(s) "His Majesty's Government Gazette - Notice of Contested Election, State Legislative Assembly for the State of Penang [P.U. (B) 252/2018]" (PDF). Attorney General's Chambers of Malaysia. 3 May 2018. "Federal Government Gazette - Results of Contested Election and Statements of the Poll after the Official Addition of Votes, State Constituencies for the State of Penang [P.U. (B) 326/2018]" (PDF). Attorney General's Chambers of Malaysia. 28 May 2018. Archived from the original (PDF) on 29 August 2019.

Penang state election, 2013
Party	Candidate	Votes	%	∆%
DAP	Wong Hon Wai	11,308	73.90	▲12.60
BN	Loo Jieh Sheng	3,992	26.10	▼12.60
Total valid votes		15,300	100.00	
Total rejected ballots		193		
Unreturned ballots		31		
Turnout		15,524	84.30	▲11.00
Registered electors		18,407		
Majority		7,316	47.80	▲25.20
DAP hold		Swing		
Source(s) "Federal Government Gazette - Notice of Contested Election, State Legislative Assembly for the State of Penang [P.U. (B) 189/2013]" (PDF). Attorney General's Chambers of Malaysia. 26 April 2013. "Federal Government Gazette - Results of Contested Election and Statements of the Poll after the Official Addition of Votes, State Constituencies for the State of Penang [P.U. (B) 230/2013]" (PDF). Attorney General's Chambers of Malaysia. 22 May 2013. Archived from the original (PDF) on 22 March 2019.

Penang state election, 2008
Party	Candidate	Votes	%	∆%
DAP	Wong Hon Wai	7,401	61.30	▲23.43
BN	Cheang Chee Gooi	4,674	38.7	▼23.43
Total valid votes		12,075	100.00	
Total rejected ballots		182		
Unreturned ballots		3		
Turnout		12,260	73.32	▲1.63
Registered electors		16,721		
Majority		2,727	22.58	▼1.71
DAP gain from BN		Swing		?

Penang state election, 2004: Air Itam
Party	Candidate	Votes	%	∆%
BN	Cheang Chee Gooi	7,225	62.15	▲62.15
DAP	Koay Teng Hai	4,401	37.85	▼1.47
Total valid votes		11,626	100.00	
Total rejected ballots		225		
Unreturned ballots		4		
Turnout		11,855	71.69	▼0.97
Registered electors		16,536		
Majority		2,824	24.29	▲2.94
BN hold		Swing		

Penang state election, 1999: Air Itam
Party	Candidate	Votes	%	∆%
BN	Lye Siew Weng	10,539	60.67	▲2.80
DAP	Ong Hock Aun	6,831	39.33	▼2.80
Total valid votes		17,370	100.00	
Total rejected ballots		351		
Unreturned ballots		34		
Turnout		17,755	72.66	▼1.16
Registered electors		24,436		
Majority		3,708	21.35	▲5.61
BN hold		Swing		

Penang state election, 1995: Air Itam
Party	Candidate	Votes	%	∆%
BN	Lye Siew Weng	10,057	57.87	▲17.91
DAP	Ong Hock Aun	7,322	42.13	▼17.91
Total valid votes		17,379	100.00	
Total rejected ballots		370		
Unreturned ballots		136		
Turnout		17,885	73.82	▼0.21
Registered electors		24,228		
Majority		2,735	15.74	▼4.34
BN gain from DAP		Swing		-

Penang state election, 1990: Ayer Itam
Party	Candidate	Votes	%	∆%
DAP	Ong Hock Aun	9,269	60.04	▲0.14
BN	Khoo Boo Yeang	6,169	39.96	▼0.14
Total valid votes		15,438	100.00	
Total rejected ballots		249		
Unreturned ballots		43		
Turnout		15,730	74.03	▲1.34
Registered electors		21,247		
Majority		3,100	20.08	▲0.27
DAP hold		Swing		-

Penang state election, 1986: Ayer Itam
Party	Candidate	Votes	%	∆%
DAP	Gooi Hock Seng	8,949	59.90	▲14.63
BN	Wong Kam Hoong	5,990	40.10	▼14.63
Total valid votes		14,939	100.00	
Total rejected ballots		331		
Unreturned ballots		0		
Turnout		15,270	72.69	▼3.88
Registered electors		21,006		
Majority		2,959	19.81	▲10.35
DAP gain from BN		Swing		-

Penang state election, 1982: Ayer Itam
Party	Candidate	Votes	%	∆%
BN	Lee Jong Ki	9,273	54.73	▲10.69
DAP	Gooi Hock Seng	7,670	45.27	▼7.15
Total valid votes		16,943	100.00	
Total rejected ballots		375		
Unreturned ballots		0		
Turnout		17,318	76.58	▼2.25
Registered electors		22,615		
Majority		1,603	9.46	▲1.08
BN gain from DAP		Swing		-

Penang state election, 1978: Ayer Itam
Party	Candidate	Votes	%	∆%
DAP	Peter Dason Muthu Jaha Dason	7,643	52.42	▲15.69
BN	Choong Ewe Leong	6,421	44.04	▼1.76
SDP	Oh Keng Seng	517	3.55	▲3.55
Total valid votes		14,581	100.00	
Total rejected ballots		320		
Unreturned ballots		0		
Turnout		14,901	78.83	▼2.58
Registered electors		18,903		
Majority		1,222	8.38	▼0.69
DAP gain from BN		Swing		-

Penang state election, 1974: Ayer Itam
Party	Candidate	Votes	%	∆%
BN	Choong Ewe Leong	5,073	45.80	▲22.60
DAP	Peter Dason Muthu Jaha Dason	4,068	36.73	▲36.73
PEKEMAS	Toolseram Rajaram	901	8.13	▲8.13
Parti Sosialis Rakyat Malaysia	Lee Yong Chew	858	7.75	▲7.75
KITA	Ong Huck Pin	106	0.96	▲0.96
Independent	Pritam Singh Pannu	70	0.63	▲0.63
Total valid votes		11,076	100.00	
Total rejected ballots		346		
Unreturned ballots		0		
Turnout		11,422	81.41	▲4.81
Registered electors		14,031		
Majority		1,005	9.07	▼44.52
BN gain from GERAKAN		Swing		-

Penang state election, 1969: Ayer Itam
Party	Candidate	Votes	%	∆%
GERAKAN	Tan Phock Kin	7,014	76.80	▲76.80
Alliance	Khoo Leong Hun	2,119	23.20	▼7.50
Total valid votes		9,133	100.00	
Total rejected ballots		342		
Unreturned ballots		0		
Turnout		9,475	76.60	▼1.77
Registered electors		12,370		
Majority		4,895	53.60	▲48.95
GERAKAN gain from Alliance		Swing		-

Malaysian general by-election, 7 November 1965: Ayer Itam Upon the death of incumbent, Chor Sin Kheng
Party	Candidate	Votes	%	∆%
Socialist Front	Lim Kean Siew	2,836	35.35	▲6.39
UDP	Tan Gim Hwa	2,683	33.44	▲18.50
Alliance	David Choong	2,463	30.70	▼12.62
Total valid votes		7,982	99.49	
Total rejected ballots		41	0.51	
Unreturned ballots		0		
Turnout		8,023	78.37	▼6.92
Registered electors		10,237		
Majority		153	4.65	▲3.07
Socialist Front gain		Swing		{{{3}}}

Penang state election, 1964: Ayer Itam
Party	Candidate	Votes	%	∆%
Alliance	Chor Sin Kheng	3,485	43.32	▼8.22
Socialist Front	Lim Kean Siew	3,358	41.74	▼6.73
UDP	Toh Boon Kooi	1,202	14.94	▲14.94
Total valid votes		8,045	100.00	
Total rejected ballots		150		
Unreturned ballots		0		
Turnout		8,195	85.29	▲13.71
Registered electors		9,608		
Majority		127	1.58	▼1.49
Alliance hold		Swing		

Penang state election, 1959: Ayer Itam
Party	Candidate	Votes	%
Alliance	Chor Sin Kheng	2,066	51.53
Socialist Front	Oh Seng Huat	1,943	48.47
Total valid votes		4,009	100.00
Total rejected ballots		66	
Unreturned ballots		0	
Turnout		4,075	71.58
Registered electors		5,693	
Majority		123	3.07
This was a new constituency created.

== See also ==
- Constituencies of Penang
