= Wong Hon Wai =

Malaysian politician

Yang Berhormat Tuan Wong Hon Wai MLA
- 黄汉伟
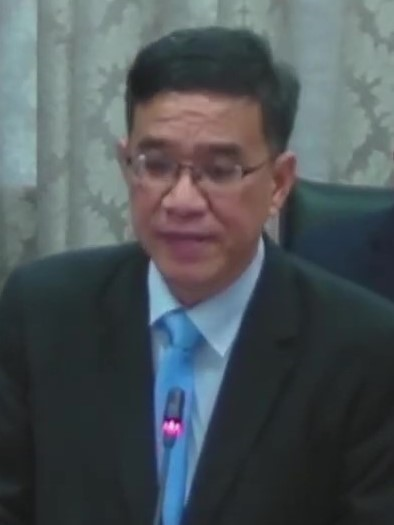
- Wong in 2020

Member of the Penang State Executive Council
- Incumbent
- Assumed office 16 August 2023 (Tourism & Creative Economy)
- Governor: Ahmad Fuzi Abdul Razak
- Chief Minister: Chow Kon Yeow
- Preceded by: Yeoh Soon Hin
- Constituency: Paya Terubong
- In office 13 March 2008 – 8 May 2013 (Housing, Urban & Rural Planning)
- Governor: Abdul Rahman Abbas
- Chief Minister: Lim Guan Eng
- Preceded by: Syed Amerrudin Syed Ahmad (Housing); Koh Tsu Koon (Urban and Rural Planning)
- Succeeded by: Jagdeep Singh Deo
- Constituency: Air Itam

Member of the Penang State Legislative Assembly for Paya Terubong
- Incumbent
- Assumed office 12 August 2023
- Preceded by: Yeoh Soon Hin (PH–DAP)
- Majority: 36,802 (2023)

Member of the Malaysian Parliament for Bukit Bendera
- In office 9 May 2018 – 19 November 2022
- Preceded by: Zairil Khir Johari (PR–DAP)
- Succeeded by: Syerleena Abdul Rashid (PH–DAP)
- Majority: 40,731 (2018)

Member of the Penang State Legislative Assembly for Air Itam
- In office 8 March 2008 – 9 May 2018
- Preceded by: Cheang Chee Gooi (BN–GERAKAN)
- Succeeded by: Joseph Ng Soon Siang (PH–DAP)
- Majority: 2,727 (2008); 7,316 (2013)

Faction represented in Dewan Rakyat
- 2018–2022: Pakatan Harapan

Faction represented in Penang State Legislative Assembly
- 2008–2018: Democratic Action Party
- 2023–: Pakatan Harapan

Personal details
- Born: Wong Hon Wai; 1 March 1973 (age 53) Air Itam, George Town, Penang
- Citizenship: Malaysian
- Party: Democratic Action Party (DAP)
- Other political affiliations: Pakatan Rakyat (PR) (2008–2015); Pakatan Harapan (PH) (since 2015)
- Education: National University of Malaysia (UKM) (BSc Computer Science); University of Malaya (UM) (Bachelor of Jurisprudence (External), Law); University of Science Malaysia (USM) (Master of Economy Management, Economics); Chung Ling High School
- Occupation: Politician

Wong Hon Wai (simplified Chinese: 黄汉伟; traditional Chinese: 黃漢偉; Jyutping: Wong4 Hon3 Wai5; pinyin: Huáng Hànwěi; Pe̍h-ōe-jī: N̂g Hàn-úi / Ûiⁿ Hàn-úi; born 1 March 1973) is a Malaysian politician who has served as Member of the Penang State Executive Council (EXCO) in the Pakatan Rakyat (PR) state administration under former Chief Minister Lim Guan Eng from March 2008 to May 2013 as well as in the Pakatan Harapan (PH) state administration under Chief Minister Chow Kon Yeow and Member of the Penang State Legislative Assembly (MLA) for Paya Terubong since August 2023. He served as the Member of Parliament (MP) for Bukit Bendera from May 2018 to November 2022, and the MLA for Air Itam from March 2008 to May 2018. He is a member of the Democratic Action Party (DAP), a component party of the PH and formerly PR coalitions.

== Election results ==
Penang State Legislative Assembly
Year	Constituency	Candidate	Votes	Pct	Opponent(s)	Votes	Pct	Ballots cast	Majority	Turnout
2008	N33 Air Itam	Wong Hon Wai (DAP)	7,401	61.30%	Cheang Chee Gooi (Gerakan)	4,674	38.70%	12,260	2,727	73.30%
2013	N33 Air Itam	Wong Hon Wai (DAP)	11,308	73.90%	Loo Jieh Sheng (Gerakan)	3,992	26.10%	15,524	7,316	84.30%
2023	N34 Paya Terubong	Wong Hon Wai (DAP)	40,530	91.58%	Andrew Ooi Ghee Oon (Gerakan)	3,728	8.42%	44,258	36,802	70.55%

Parliament of Malaysia
Year	Constituency	Candidate	Votes	Pct	Opponent(s)	Votes	Pct	Ballots cast	Majority	Turnout
2018	P048 Bukit Bendera	Wong Hon Wai (DAP)	50,049	83.83%	Andy Yong Kim Seng (Gerakan)	9,318	15.61%	60,429	40,731	80.50%
2018	P048 Bukit Bendera	Wong Hon Wai (DAP)	50,049	83.83%	Tan Gim Theam (MUP)	339	0.57%	60,429	40,731	80.50%
