= Ayer Hitam (disambiguation) =

Ayer Hitam is a town in Batu Pahat District, Johor.

Ayer Hitam, Air Itam or Ayer Itam may also refer to:

== Places ==
- Air Itam, a suburb of George Town in Penang
- Ayer Hitam Parish, a mukim in Muar District, Johor

== Constituencies ==
- Ayer Hitam (federal constituency), represented in the Dewan Rakyat
- Air Itam (Penang state constituency), represented in the Penang State Legislative Assembly (since 1995)
- Ayer Itam (Penang state constituency), formerly represented in the Penang State Legislative Assembly (1959–95)
- Ayer Hitam (Kedah state constituency), formerly represented in the Kedah State Legislative Assembly (since 1995)
- Ayer Hitam (Johor state constituency), formerly represented in the Johor State Legislative Assembly (1959–74), see List of Malaysian State Assembly Representatives (1969–74)
