= Paya Terubong (state constituency) =

State constituency in Penang, Malaysia

Paya Terubong (N34)
Penang constituency
- Paya Terubong (olive) on Penang

State constituency
- Legislature: Penang State Legislative Assembly
MLA
Wong Hon Wai
PH
- Constituency created: 1974
- First contested: 1974
- Last contested: 2023

Demographics
- Electors (2023): 62,734
- Area (km²): 24

Paya Terubong is a state constituency in Penang, Malaysia, that has been represented in the Penang State Legislative Assembly since 1974. It covers two suburbs of George Town - Paya Terubong and parts of Air Itam - both at the centre of Penang Island.

The state constituency was created in the 1974 redistribution and is mandated to return a single Assemblyman to the Penang State Legislative Assembly under the first-past-the-post voting system. Since 2008, the State Assemblyman for Paya Terubong is Yeoh Soon Hin from the DAP, which is part of the state's ruling coalition, Pakatan Harapan (PH).

In terms of population size, Paya Terubong is the largest state constituency in Penang, with 46,741 registered voters within this constituency alone as of April 2018. Concerns have been raised by the locals about the lopsided population disparity between the Paya Terubong constituency and the other, less populated seats in Penang, and the perceived malapportionment of the state seats.

== Definition ==
The Paya Terubong constituency encompasses the entire Paya Terubong suburb, as well as the southern part of the Air Itam suburb, specifically the neighbourhood of Farlim. It is partly bounded to the north by the Dondang River; the portion of Air Itam north of the river falls under the neighbouring Air Itam constituency.

To the south of the island's central valleys, the neighbourhood of Relau also falls under this constituency.

=== Polling districts ===
According to the federal gazette issued on 18 July 2023, the Paya Terubong constituency is divided into 11 polling districts.

State constituency	Polling districts	Code	Location
Paya Terubong (N34)	Paya Terubong Mukim 14	051/34/01	SJK (C) Kong Min Cawangan Kedua
Paya Terubong (N34)	Sungai Dondang	051/34/02	* SMK Air Itam: SK Seri Indah
Paya Terubong (N34)	Paya Terubong Mukim 13	051/34/03	SJK (C) Kong Min Cawangan Kedua
Paya Terubong (N34)	Taman Paya Terubong	051/54/04	Tanah Lapang Lot 5208 (5.384250°N 100.276222°E)
Paya Terubong (N34)	Relau	051/34/05	SK Seri Relau
Paya Terubong (N34)	Desa Baiduri	051/34/06	Dewan Komuniti Blok 1B Desa Baiduri
Paya Terubong (N34)	Desa Intan	051/34/07	Dewan Komuniti Blok 7A Desa Intan
Paya Terubong (N34)	Semarak Api 1	051/34/08	Dewan Komuniti Blok 4E Semarak Api
Paya Terubong (N34)	Jln Semarak Api	051/34/09	Dewan Komuniti Blok 4B Semarak Api
Paya Terubong (N34)	Bukit Awana	051/34/10	Ruang Legar Rumah Pangsa Taman Paya Terubong
Paya Terubong (N34)	Terubong Jaya	051/34/11	Tapak Pasar Malam Tkt Paya Terubong Wayton

== Demographics ==
Ethnic breakdown of Paya Terubong's electorate as of 2023
1. Chinese (77.6%)
2. Indian (13.8%)
3. Malay (7.76%)
4. Other ethnicities (0.84%)

Total electors by polling district in 2016
Polling district	Electors
Bukit Awana	1,825
Desa Baiduri	3,712
Desa Intan	1,716
Jalan Semarak Api	2,325
Paya Terubong Mukim 13	6,411
Paya Terubong Mukim 14	1,750
Relau	6,486
Semarak Api 1	3,030
Sungai Dondang	8,573
Taman Paya Terubong	2,204
Terubong Jaya	3,675
Total	41,707
Source: Malaysian Election Commission

== History ==
Penang State Legislative Assemblyman for Paya Terubong
Assembly	No	Years	Member	Party
Constituency created from Ayer Itam, Dhoby Ghaut and Glugor
4th	N21	1974 – 1978	Khoo Teng Chye (邱鼎才)	BN (GERAKAN)
5th	N21	1978 – 1982	Chin Nyok Soo (陈毓书)	DAP
6th	N21	1982 – 1986	Chin Nyok Soo (陈毓书)	BN (MCA)
7th	N29	1986 – 1990	Chin Nyok Soo (陈毓书)	BN (MCA)
8th	N29	1990 – 1995	Teoh Teik Huat (张德发)	GR (DAP)
9th	N29	1995 – 1999	Loh Hock Hun (骆福汉)	BN (MCA)
10th	N29	1999 – 2004	Loh Hock Hun (骆福汉)	BN (MCA)
11th	N34	2004 – 2008	Loh Hock Hun (骆福汉)	BN (MCA)
12th	N34	2008 – 2013	Yeoh Soon Hin (杨顺兴)	PR (DAP)
13th	N34	2013 – 2015	Yeoh Soon Hin (杨顺兴)	PR (DAP)
13th	N34	2015 – 2018	Yeoh Soon Hin (杨顺兴)	PH (DAP)
14th	N34	2018 – 2023	Yeoh Soon Hin (杨顺兴)	PH (DAP)
15th	N34	2023–present	Wong Hon Wai (黄汉伟)	PH (DAP)

== Election results ==
The electoral results for the Paya Terubong state constituency in 2008, 2013 and 2018 are as follows.

Penang state election, 2023
Party	Candidate	Votes	%	∆%
PH	Wong Hon Wai	40,530	91.60	▲5.00
PN	Ooi Ghee Oon	3,758	8.40	▲8.40
Total valid votes		44,258	100.00	
Total rejected ballots		245		
Unreturned ballots		71		
Turnout		44,574	71.05	▼14.95
Registered electors		62,734		
Majority		36,802	83.20	▲5.00
PH hold		Swing		

Penang state election, 2018
Party	Candidate	Votes	%	∆%
PKR	Yeoh Soon Hin	35,315	88.60	▲88.60
BN	Wong Chin Chong	4,126	10.40	▼2.72
BERSAMA	Kuan Aun Wan	421	1.00	▲1.00
Total valid votes		39,862	100.00	
Total rejected ballots		235		
Unreturned ballots		88		
Turnout		40,185	86.00	▼2.82
Registered electors		46,741		
Majority		31,189	78.20	▲4.44
PKR hold		Swing		
Source(s) "His Majesty's Government Gazette - Notice of Contested Election, State Legislative Assembly for the State of Penang [P.U. (B) 252/2018]" (PDF). Attorney General's Chambers of Malaysia. 3 May 2018. "Federal Government Gazette - Results of Contested Election and Statements of the Poll after the Official Addition of Votes, State Constituencies for the State of Penang [P.U. (B) 326/2018]" (PDF). Attorney General's Chambers of Malaysia. 28 May 2018. Archived from the original (PDF) on 29 August 2019.

Penang state election, 2013
Party	Candidate	Votes	%	∆%
DAP	Yeoh Soon Hin	30,295	86.88	▲12.25
BN	Koh Wan Leong	4,576	13.12	▼12.25
Total valid votes		34,871	100.00	
Total rejected ballots		305		
Unreturned ballots		39		
Turnout		35,215	88.82	▲8.38
Registered electors		39,649		
Majority		25,719	73.76	▲24.50
DAP hold		Swing		
Source(s) "Federal Government Gazette - Notice of Contested Election, State Legislative Assembly for the State of Penang [P.U. (B) 189/2013]" (PDF). Attorney General's Chambers of Malaysia. 26 April 2013. "Federal Government Gazette - Results of Contested Election and Statements of the Poll after the Official Addition of Votes, State Constituencies for the State of Penang [P.U. (B) 230/2013]" (PDF). Attorney General's Chambers of Malaysia. 22 May 2013. Archived from the original (PDF) on 22 March 2019.

Penang state election, 2008
Party	Candidate	Votes	%	∆%
DAP	Yeoh Soon Hin	16,848	74.63	▲28.46
BN	Koh Wan Leong	5,727	25.37	▼28.46
Total valid votes		22,575	100.00	
Total rejected ballots		250		
Unreturned ballots		7		
Turnout		22,832	80.44	▲2.03
Registered electors		28,383		
Majority		11,121	49.26	▲41.60
DAP gain from BN		Swing		?

Penang state election, 2004
Party	Candidate	Votes	%	∆%
BN	Loh Hock Hun	9,772	53.83	▼8.97
DAP	Yeoh Soon Hin	8,380	46.17	▲8.97
Total valid votes		18,152	100.00	
Total rejected ballots		260		
Unreturned ballots		6		
Turnout		18,418	78.41	▲1.35
Registered electors		23,490		
Majority		1,392	7.66	▼17.94
BN hold		Swing		

Penang state election, 1999
Party	Candidate	Votes	%	∆%
BN	Loh Hock Hun	15,298	62.80	▲4.11
DAP	Fong Kam Cheong	9,062	37.20	▼4.11
Total valid votes		24,360	100.00	
Total rejected ballots		467		
Unreturned ballots		18		
Turnout		24,845	77.06	▼2.19
Registered electors		32,240		
Majority		6,236	25.60	▲7.60
BN hold		Swing		

Penang state election, 1995
Party	Candidate	Votes	%	∆%
BN	Loh Hock Hun	13,097	58.69	▲11.40
DAP	Teoh Teik Huat	9,081	40.69	▼12.02
PBS	Selvaraja Somiah David Somiah	138	0.62	▲0.62
Total valid votes		22,316	100.00	
Total rejected ballots		318		
Unreturned ballots		69		
Turnout		22,703	79.25	▲1.70
Registered electors		28,648		
Majority		4,016	18.00	▲12.57
BN gain from DAP		Swing		?

Penang state election, 1990
Party	Candidate	Votes	%	∆%
DAP	Teoh Teik Huat	8,921	52.71	▲5.38
BN	Chin Nyok Soo	8,003	47.29	▼5.38
Total valid votes		16,924	100.00	
Total rejected ballots		312		
Unreturned ballots		22		
Turnout		17,258	77.55	▲3.52
Registered electors		22,254		
Majority		918	5.42	▲0.09
DAP gain from BN		Swing		?

Penang state election, 1986
Party	Candidate	Votes	%	∆%
BN	Chin Nyok Soo	7,558	52.67	▼2.09
DAP	Chong Neng Hua	6,793	47.33	▲15.84
Total valid votes		14,351	100.00	
Total rejected ballots		327		
Unreturned ballots		0		
Turnout		14,678	74.03	▼2.69
Registered electors		19,828		
Majority		765	5.33	▼17.94
BN hold		Swing		

Penang state election, 1982
Party	Candidate	Votes	%	∆%
BN	Chin Nyok Soo	8,889	54.76	▲6.01
DAP	Wong Sang Yoke	5,112	31.49	▼19.76
Independent	Lee Chee Liang	1,261	7.77	▲7.77
Independent	R. Rajasingam	971	5.98	▲5.98
Total valid votes		16,233	100.00	
Total rejected ballots		329		
Unreturned ballots		0		
Turnout		16,562	76.72	▼2.70
Registered electors		21,588		
Majority		3,777	23.27	▲21.31
BN gain from DAP		Swing		?

Penang state election, 1978
Party	Candidate	Votes	%	∆%
DAP	Chin Nyok Soo	5,525	51.25	▲20.90
BN	Lau Kok Chew	5,255	48.75	▲7.51
Total valid votes		13,760	100.00	
Total rejected ballots		379		
Unreturned ballots		0		
Turnout		14,139	79.42	▼1.66
Registered electors		17,803		
Majority		270	1.96	▼8.93
DAP gain from BN		Swing		?

Penang state election, 1974
Party	Candidate	Votes	%
BN	Khoo Teng Chye	4,143	41.24
DAP	Lim Cheng Teik	3,049	30.35
Parti Sosialis Rakyat Malaysia	Tan Ee Hwa	1,947	19.38
PEKEMAS	Tan Kok Ping	906	9.02
Total valid votes		10,045	100.00
Total rejected ballots		337	
Unreturned ballots		0	
Turnout		10,382	81.08
Registered electors		12,804	
Majority		1,094	10.89
This was a new constituency created.

== See also ==
- Constituencies of Penang
