= Pengkalan Kota =

State in Malaysia

Pengkalan Kota (N27)
Penang constituency
- Pengkalan Kota (olive) on Penang

State constituency
- Legislature: Penang State Legislative Assembly
MLA
Wong Yuee Harng
PH
- Constituency created: 1974
- First contested: 1974
- Last contested: 2023

Demographics
- Electors (2023): 21,568
- Area (km²): 1

Pengkalan Kota is a state constituency in Penang, Malaysia, that has been represented in the Penang State Legislative Assembly since 1974. It covers the eastern quayside of George Town's city centre and its historic Seven Streets Precinct.

The state constituency was first contested in 1974 and is mandated to return a single Assemblyman to the Penang State Legislative Assembly under the first-past-the-post voting system. Since 2018, the State Assemblyman for Pengkalan Kota has been Wong Yuee Harng from the Democratic Action Party (DAP), which is part of the state's ruling coalition, Pakatan Harapan (PH).

== Definition ==
=== Polling districts ===
According to the federal gazette issued on 30 March 2018, the Pengkalan Kota constituency is divided into 9 polling districts.

State constituency	Polling districts	Code	Location
Pengkalan Kota (N27)	Leboh Presgrave	049/27/01	SJK (C) Heng Ee
Pengkalan Kota (N27)	Jalan Magazine	049/27/02	SJK (C) Sum Min
Pengkalan Kota (N27)	Jalan Prangin	049/27/03	SJK (C) Sum Min
Pengkalan Kota (N27)	Leboh Victoria	049/27/04	SJK (C) Li Tek 'A'
Pengkalan Kota (N27)	Pengkalan Welf	049/27/05	SJK (C) Li Tek 'B'
Pengkalan Kota (N27)	Gat Leboh Noordin	049/27/06	SJK (C) Li Tek Cawangan
Pengkalan Kota (N27)	Jalan C.Y.Choy	049/27/07	Dewan Li Tek Seah
Pengkalan Kota (N27)	Macallum Street	049/27/08	SJK (C) Eng Chuan
Pengkalan Kota (N27)	Leboh Cecil	049/27/09	SJK (C) Eng Chuan

This state seat encompasses the eastern part of George Town's UNESCO World Heritage Site, specifically around much of Weld Quay. Historically, the eastern quayside of the city centre was the original location of the Port of Penang. Towards the end of the 19th century, the Port of Penang's trade boom led to a growth of harbour-related jobs around this particular locality, which also attracted increasing numbers of Chinese and Indian labourers to satiate the demand for manpower.

In addition, the Pengkalan Kota constituency covers the adjacent Chinese Clan Jetties, including the famous Chew Jetty, as well as the Seven Streets Precinct (between Komtar and the eastern shoreline of George Town), the latter of which is outside the UNESCO site. Both of these residential areas came into being in the late 19th century and contain predominantly working-class Chinese electorates. The newer neighbourhood of Macallum Street Ghaut, which was reclaimed from the sea in the 1970s, also falls under this state seat.

The state constituency is bounded by the following roads: China Street Ghaut to the north, and Beach Street, Prangin Road, Carnavon Street, Magazine Road, Brick Kiln Road and Jalan C.Y. Choy to the west. The lower Pinang River also marks the southern limits of this constituency.

== Demographics ==
Ethnic breakdown of Pengkalan Kota's electorate as of 2023
1. Chinese (89.3%)
2. Indian (8.21%)
3. Malay (2.05%)
4. Other ethnicities (0.43%)

Total electors by polling district in 2016
Polling district	Electors
Gat Leboh Noordin	2,125
Jalan C.Y. Choy	2,564
Jalan Magazine	1,509
Jalan Prangin	954
Leboh Cecil	1,914
Leboh Presgrave	1,194
Leboh Victoria	1,330
Macallum Street	1,241
Pengkalan Weld	7,096
Total	19,927
Source: Malaysian Election Commission

== History ==
Bridge Street, located within the Seven Streets Precinct, was renamed after Chooi Yew Choy, who became the State Assemblyman for Pengkalan Kota between 1974 and 1980. Choy had also served as the last Mayor of George Town between 1964 and 1966, prior to the dissolution of the George Town City Council.

After Choy's death in 1980, a by-election for the Pengkalan Kota constituency was held, in which Lim Kean Siew of the Malaysian Chinese Association (MCA) defeated three other candidates.

Penang State Legislative Assemblyman for Pengkalan Kota
Assembly	No	Years	Member	Party
Constituency created from Tanjong Tengah, Kota, Tanjong Selatan and Sungei Pinang
4th	N24	1974 – 1978	Chooi Yew Choy (崔耀才)	IND
5th	N24	1978 – 1980	Chooi Yew Choy (崔耀才)	IND
5th	N24	1980 – 1982	Lim Kean Siew (林建寿)	BN (MCA)
6th	N24	1982 – 1986	Teoh Teik Huat (张德发)	DAP
7th	N23	1986 – 1990	Teoh Teik Huat (张德发)	DAP
8th	N23	1990 – 1995	Chow Kon Yeow (曹观友)	GR (DAP)
9th	N23	1995 – 1999	Lee Hack Teik (李学德)	BN (MCA)
10th	N23	1999 – 2004	Lee Hack Teik (李学德)	BN (MCA)
11th	N27	2004 – 2008	Lee Hack Teik (李学德)	BN (MCA)
12th	N27	2008 – 2013	Lau Keng Ee (刘敬亿)	PR (DAP)
13th	N27	2013 – 2015	Lau Keng Ee (刘敬亿)	PR (DAP)
13th	N27	2015–2018	Lau Keng Ee (刘敬亿)	PH (DAP)
14th	N27	2018 – 2023	Daniel Gooi Zi Sen (魏子森)	PH (DAP)
15th	N27	2023–present	Wong Yuee Harng (王宇航)	PH (DAP)

== Election results ==
The electoral results for the Pengkalan Kota state constituency in 2008, 2013 and 2018 are as follows.

Penang state election, 2023: Pengkalan Kota
Party	Candidate	Votes	%	∆%
PH	Wong Yuee Harng	14,921	94.60	▲5.70
PN	Suthakaran Subramaniam	845	5.40	▲5.40
Total valid votes		15,776	100.00	
Total rejected ballots		116		
Unreturned ballots		10		
Turnout		15,892	73.68	▼11.62
Registered electors		21,568		
Majority		14,076	89.20	▲10.00
PH hold		Swing		

Penang state election, 2018: Pengkalan Kota
Party	Candidate	Votes	%	∆%
PKR	Gooi Zi Sen	15,037	88.90	▲88.90
BN	Lim Swee Bok	1,647	9.70	▼0.80
Parti Rakyat Malaysia	Chew Seng Tung	68	0.40	▲0.40
BERSAMA	Koay Teng Lye	82	0.50	▲0.50
Independent	Ragindran Sivasamy	87	0.50	▲0.50
Total valid votes		16,921	100.00	
Total rejected ballots		166		
Unreturned ballots		25		
Turnout		17,112	85.30	▼2.10
Registered electors		20,069		
Majority		13,390	79.20	▲0.20
PKR hold		Swing		
Source(s) "His Majesty's Government Gazette - Notice of Contested Election, State Legislative Assembly for the State of Penang [P.U. (B) 252/2018]" (PDF). Attorney General's Chambers of Malaysia. 3 May 2018. "Federal Government Gazette - Results of Contested Election and Statements of the Poll after the Official Addition of Votes, State Constituencies for the State of Penang [P.U. (B) 326/2018]" (PDF). Attorney General's Chambers of Malaysia. 28 May 2018. Archived from the original (PDF) on 29 August 2019.

Penang state election, 2013: Pengkalan Kota
Party	Candidate	Votes	%	∆%
DAP	Lau Keng Ee	15,403	89.50	▲21.10
BN	Loke Poh Chye	1,803	10.50	▼21.10
Total valid votes		17,206	100.00	
Total rejected ballots		243		
Unreturned ballots		13		
Turnout		17,462	87.40	▲10.00
Registered electors		19,980		
Majority		13,600	79.00	▲42.20
DAP hold		Swing		
Source(s) "Federal Government Gazette - Notice of Contested Election, State Legislative Assembly for the State of Penang [P.U. (B) 189/2013]" (PDF). Attorney General's Chambers of Malaysia. 26 April 2013. "Federal Government Gazette - Results of Contested Election and Statements of the Poll after the Official Addition of Votes, State Constituencies for the State of Penang [P.U. (B) 230/2013]" (PDF). Attorney General's Chambers of Malaysia. 22 May 2013. Archived from the original (PDF) on 22 March 2019.

Penang state election, 2008: Pengkalan Kota
Party	Candidate	Votes	%	∆%
DAP	Lau Keng Ee	10,185	68.40	▲28.03
BN	Lee Hack Teik	4,708	31.60	▼28.03
Total valid votes		14,893	100.00	
Total rejected ballots		195		
Unreturned ballots		2		
Turnout		15,090	77.35	▲2.73
Registered electors		19,508		
Majority		5,477	36.78	▲17.52
DAP gain from BN		Swing		?

Penang state election, 2004: Pengkalan Kota
Party	Candidate	Votes	%	∆%
BN	Lee Hack Teik	9,067	59.63	▲0.62
DAP	Lai Hon Meng	6,139	40.37	▼0.62
Total valid votes		15,206	100.00	
Total rejected ballots		304		
Unreturned ballots		0		
Turnout		15,510	74.62	▼2.39
Registered electors		20,785		
Majority		2,928	19.26	▲1.24
BN hold		Swing		

Penang state election, 1999: Pengkalan Kota
Party	Candidate	Votes	%	∆%
BN	Lee Hack Teik	9,679	59.01	▲4.87
DAP	Lai Hon Meng	6,724	40.99	▼4.08
Total valid votes		16,403	100.00	
Total rejected ballots		352		
Unreturned ballots		3		
Turnout		16,758	77.01	▼1.78
Registered electors		21,761		
Majority		2,955	18.01	▲8.95
BN hold		Swing		

Penang state election, 1995: Pengkalan Kota
Party	Candidate	Votes	%	∆%
BN	Lee Hack Teik	9,036	54.14	▲13.80
DAP	Chow Kon Yeow	7,523	45.07	▼14.58
PBS	Khoo Soo Hoe	131	0.78	▲0.78
Total valid votes		16,690	100.00	
Total rejected ballots		292		
Unreturned ballots		11		
Turnout		16,993	78.79	▲1.89
Registered electors		21,567		
Majority		1,513	9.07	▼10.25
BN gain from DAP		Swing		-

Penang state election, 1990: Pengkalan Kota
Party	Candidate	Votes	%	∆%
DAP	Chow Kon Yeow	11,336	59.66	▲1.10
BN	Loh Hock Hun	7,666	40.34	▼1.10
Total valid votes		19,002	100.00	
Total rejected ballots		374		
Unreturned ballots		18		
Turnout		19,394	76.90	▼1.65
Registered electors		25,220		
Majority		3,670	19.31	▲2.20
DAP hold		Swing		

Penang state election, 1986: Pengkalan Kota
Party	Candidate	Votes	%	∆%
DAP	Teoh Teik Huat	10,862	58.56	▲6.83
BN	Loh Hock Hun	7,688	41.44	▼6.83
Total valid votes		18,550	100.00	
Total rejected ballots		368		
Unreturned ballots		0		
Turnout		18,918	78.55	▼2.04
Registered electors		24,084		
Majority		3,174	17.11	▲13.65
DAP hold		Swing		

Penang state election, 1982: Pengkalan Kota
Party	Candidate	Votes	%	∆%
DAP	Teoh Teik Huat	9,213	51.73	▲8.92
BN	Lim Kean Siew	8,597	48.27	▲1.69
Total valid votes		17,810	100.00	
Total rejected ballots		305		
Unreturned ballots		0		
Turnout		18,115	80.59	▲5.76
Registered electors		22,478		
Majority		616	3.46	▼0.31
DAP gain from BN		Swing		-

Malaysian general by-election, 15 November 1980: Pengkalan Kota Upon the death of incumbent, Chooi Yew Choy
Party	Candidate	Votes	%	∆%
BN	Lim Kean Siew	6,839	46.58	▲29.07
DAP	Teoh Teik Huat	6,285	42.80	▲19.06
Independent	Lim Ewe Chin	1,503	10.24	▼48.51
Independent	Tan Kee Chye	56	0.38	▼58.37
Total valid votes		14,683	100.00	
Total rejected ballots		117		
Unreturned ballots		0		
Turnout		14,800	74.83	▼6.67
Registered electors		19,777		
Majority		554	3.77	▼31.23
BN gain from Independent		Swing		-

Penang state election, 1978: Pengkalan Kota
Party	Candidate	Votes	%	∆%
Independent	Chooi Yew Choy	8,562	58.75	▲3.93
DAP	Ooi Soo Toe	3,460	23.74	▲9.00
BN	Tan Chin Bee	2,552	17.51	▼9.10
Total valid votes		14,574	100.00	
Total rejected ballots		553		
Unreturned ballots		0		
Turnout		15,127	81.51	▲4.13
Registered electors		18,559		
Majority		5,102	35.01	▲6.80
Independent hold		Swing		

Penang state election, 1974: Pengkalan Kota
Party	Candidate	Votes	%	∆%
Independent	Chooi Yew Choy	5,706	54.82	▲54.82
BN	Mah Cheok Tat	2,770	26.61	▲8.60
DAP	Koay Boon Seng	1,534	14.74	▲14.74
PEKEMAS	Wong Hoong Yin	399	3.83	▲3.83
Total valid votes		10,409	100.00	
Total rejected ballots		406		
Unreturned ballots		0		
Turnout		10,815	77.38	▲2.80
Registered electors		13,977		
Majority		2,936	28.21	▼32.51
Independent gain from GERAKAN		Swing		-

== See also ==
- Constituencies of Penang
