= Universiti Malaysia Sabah =

Public university in Malaysia

Coordinates: 6°02′12″N 116°07′07″E

University of Malaysia Sabah
- Universiti Malaysia Sabah (Malay) 沙巴大学 (Chinese)
- Motto: Malay: Bertekad Cemerlang; Jawi: برتيكد چمرلڠ
- Motto in English: Determined to Excel
- Type: Public comprehensive university
- Established: 24 November 1994; 31 years ago
- Chancellor: Musa Aman
- Vice-Chancellor: Datuk Professor Dr. Kasim Hj Mansor
- Pro-Chancellors: Hajiji Noor; Azman Hashim
- Academic staff: 1,056 (2020)
- Students: ~70,000 (2022)
- Undergraduates: 17,045 (2022)
- Postgraduates: 942 (2022)
- Doctoral students: 183 (2022)
- Location: Jalan UMS, 88400 Kota Kinabalu, Sabah, Malaysia, Kota Kinabalu, Sabah, Malaysia
- Campus: Kota Kinabalu Labuan Sandakan
- Colors: Red, blue and yellow
- Website: www.ums.edu.my

Universiti Malaysia Sabah (UMS; English: University of Malaysia Sabah) is a comprehensive public university in Malaysia. It was officially established on 24 November 1994 as the ninth public university in the country. The university is located on a 999-acre site at Sepanggar Bay in Kota Kinabalu in the Malaysian state of Sabah.

On 4 April 2025, a man's corpse was found hanging from a tree branch on the hillside leading to Kampung Kibagu, nearby UMS Kota Kinabalu campus. One day later, UMS authorities confirmed that UMS students and staffs were not involved, investigation ongoing afterwards.

Universiti Malaysia Sabah (UMS) has faced serious water shortages since 2020 after COVID-19 pandemic, primarily due to insufficient supply from the Sabah State Water Department's R13 tank and mismanagement. On 12 June 2024, Prime Minister Datuk Seri Anwar Ibrahim approved a RM3 million federal allocation to fund three groundwater drilling and treatment projects at Universiti Malaysia Sabah (UMS) to address the campus's ongoing water crisis. On 14 June 2024, around 80 students from Universiti Malaysia Sabah (UMS) and public staged a protest for Kami Mahu Air ("We Want Water") Sabah rally, marching 5 km to Kinabalu Tower without a police permit and demanding to hand a six-point memorandum directly to Chief Minister Datuk Seri Hajiji Noor. Despite Deputy Chief Minister Datuk Shahelmey Yahya offering to receive the memorandum and police informing the students that Chief Minister would meet in the following week, the students refused and insisted on delivering the memorandum directly to Chief Minister.

== History ==
=== 20th century (1994–2000) ===
In its early years of establishment, UMS operated from temporary borrowed facilities with the university's teaching and learning activities conducted at the Sabah Foundation Community College premises in Likas in 1995 and the Menggatal Telekom Training College in 1996. The initial UMS enrolment in 1995 was 205 students at undergraduate study level.

From June 1999 to May 2000, UMS shifted in phases to its permanent campus at Sepanggar Bay. In January 1999, the university expanded its academic reach to the Federal Territory of Labuan with the establishment of the UMS Labuan International Campus (Malay: Universiti Malaysia Sabah Kampus Antarabangsa Labuan, abbreviated as UMSKAL).

In the beginning, study programmes were offered by three schools – the School of Science and Technology, School of Business and Economics and School of Social Sciences – and the Centre for the Promotion of Knowledge and Language Learning, a liberal studies centre.

=== 21st century (2001–present) ===
The number was subsequently expanded to include nine additional schools at the Kota Kinabalu campus such as the School of Engineering and Information Technology, School of Food Science and Nutrition, School of International Tropical Forestry, School of Education and Social Development, School of Psychology and Social Works, and School of Arts Studies.

In F.T. Labuan, programmes were offered through the Labuan School of Informatics Science and School of Business and International Finance. By 2002, UMS had established 11 programmes of study.

In 2003, the number of schools had increased to 12 after the addition of the School of Medicine. This was followed by the establishment of the School of Sustainable Agriculture in 2006 which subsequently relocated five years later in 2011 to the UMS Sandakan Campus, its current location.

Other notable initiatives were the establishment of Preparatory Centre for Science and Technology (PPST) in 2010 offering Foundation in Science Programme for Sijil Pelajaran Malaysia high school graduates. PPST began accepting students for its first intake in May 2010 and originally placed under the supervision of the Faculty of Science and Natural Resources until 2013. The launching of the UMS Hospital (HUMS) building project was targeted for completion estimated in December 2025. The hospital equipped with 400 beds, 25 operating rooms, 40 intensive care unit (ICU) beds, and 145 specialist clinics.

=== 2024 Water Supply Protests ===
On 14 June 2024, around 80 students from Universiti Malaysia Sabah (UMS) led by Suara Mahasiswa UMS organized a protest, Kami Mahu Air ("We Want Water") to highlight ongoing water shortage crisis on campus, which they attributed to administrative negligence and possible corruption within the state government. Sabah Chief Minister Hajiji Noor responded by stating that the situation differed from reports by the Sabah Water Department but assured that the state government would investigate, while Deputy Chief Minister Shahelmey Yahya described the protest as "immature.".

=== 2024 Perhimpunan Aman Gempur Rasuah Sabah ("Peaceful Rally Against Corruption in Sabah") ===
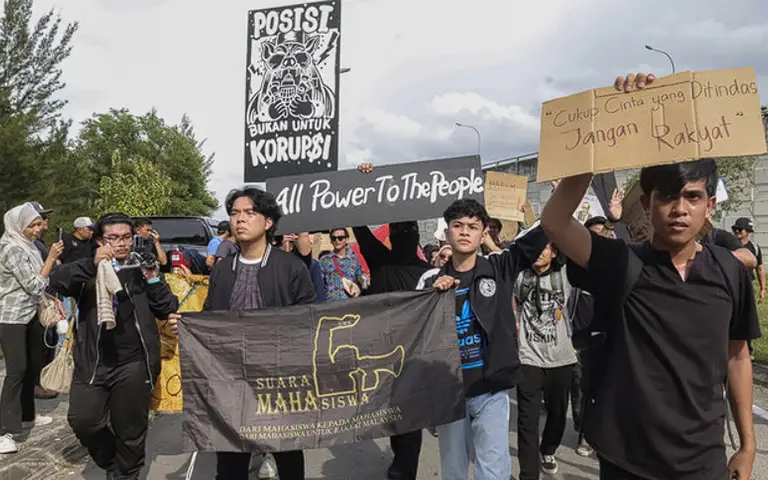
Students from Suara Mahasiswa protesting during Gempur Rasuah Sabah, anti-corruption rally

On 31 December 2024, Suara Mahasiswa, a campus-political student movement from UMS, organized Perhimpunan Aman Gempur Rasuah Sabah ("Peaceful Rally Against Corruption in Sabah") in front of Kinabalu Tower. The rally was held to protest against corruption and abuse of power in the state government. Among Suara Mahasiswa UMS demands were the resignation of Chief Minister Datuk Seri Hajiji Noor and a rejection of the appointment of Tun Musa Aman as Yang di-Pertua Negeri due to past corruption allegations. The organizers stated that the movement was non-partisan and urged the public to join in advocating for transparency, accountability, and democratic governance. The group also condemned a counter-rally titled Kami Bersama Hajiji ("We Be With Hajiji"), held at the same time and location, as a provocation intended to distract from the anti-corruption cause.

=== 2025 Perhimpunan Aman Gempur Rasuah Sabah 2.0 ("Peaceful Rally Against Corruption in Sabah 2.0") ===
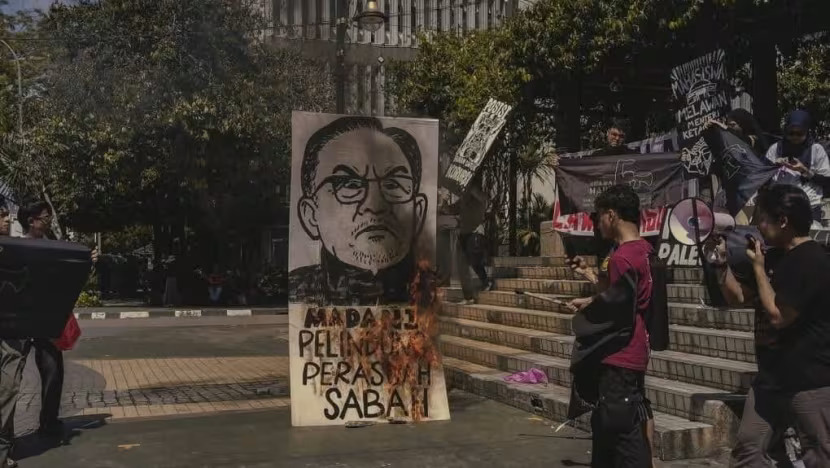
Burning caricature of Prime Minister Anwar Ibrahim during Gempur Rasuah Sabah 2.0, anti-corruption rally

On 21–22 June 2025, Suara Mahasiswa UMS organized Perhimpunan Aman Gempur Rasuah Sabah 2.0, a student-led anti-corruption rally that began at Suria Sabah and ended with a sit-in at Lintasan Deasoka in Kota Kinabalu. The rally drew around 100 participants and called for improved governance and action on issues such as corruption and water shortages affecting UMS. A controversial moment occurred when students burned a caricature of Prime Minister Anwar Ibrahim, prompting public backlash and police investigations under several laws including the Sedition Act. UMS announced possible disciplinary action against 13 students, with two identified as directly involved in the burning. In response to criticism, some students defended their actions in Instagram and TikTok as symbolic protest, referencing similar acts by Anwar during his own student activism in the 1970s. Prime Minister Anwar Ibrahim later urged UMS not to expel the students involved in the rally, emphasizing that students' future and opportunity to complete their studies should be prioritized. The message was conveyed by Higher Education Minister Zambry Abdul Kadir acknowledging the right to assemble is protected under the Malaysian Constitution but that it should be exercised within the framework of existing laws and university regulations.

== Academic ==
=== Teaching and learning ===
Universiti Malaysia Sabah (UMS) was established on 24 November 1994, becoming the ninth public institution of higher learning (IPTA) in Malaysia at that time. The university was officially formed under the Universiti Malaysia Sabah (Incorporation) Order 1994, and concurrently, the Universiti Malaysia Sabah (Campus) Order 1994 was issued to designate the university's location and campus site. Both orders were gazetted on 30 October 1994 under the Universities and University Colleges Act 1971 and came into effect on 24 November 1994.

The university also operates its own academic publishing house, Universiti Malaysia Sabah Press, which publishes scholarly books, monographs, and peer-reviewed journals.

==== Motto ====
"Strive to Excel"

Original motto in Bahasa Malaysia: "Bertekad Cemerlang".

=== Faculties ===
UMS restructured its 13 existing schools into 12 faculties, 1 academy, and 4 centres of excellence since 1 June 2014. UMS currently offers 115 academic study programmes at pre-university foundation level (5), diploma level (2), undergraduate level (68), postgraduate masters level (69) and doctor of philosophy (PhD) level (34). The university has international collaborations within the ASEAN region, with Dr. Adi fahrudin from Indonesia serving as a visiting professor from 2015 to 2023.

No.	Faculties	Fakulti (Bahasa Malaysia)	Foundation Programmes	Undergraduate Programmes	Master Programmes	Phd Programmes
1.	Academy of Arts & Creative Technology	Akademi Seni dan Teknologi Kreatif	–	3	3	1
2.	Faculty of Engineering	Fakulti Kejuruteraan	–	6	1	1
3.	Labuan Faculty of International Finance	Fakulti Kewangan Antarabangsa Labuan	–	5	3	1
4.	Faculty of Computing and Informatics	Fakulti Komputeran dan Informatik	–	5	2	2
5.	Faculty of Islamic Studies	Fakulti Pengajian Islam	–	1	5	1
6.	Faculty of Tropical Forestry	Fakulti Perhutanan Tropika	–	5	11	5
7.	Faculty of Business, Economics and Accountancy	Fakulti Perniagaan, Ekonomi dan Perakaunan	–	10	4	1
8.	Faculty of Sustainable Agriculture,	Fakulti Pertanian Lestari	–	3	9	2
9.	Faculty of Medicine and Health Science	Fakulti Perubatan dan Sains Kesihatan	–	2	1	2
10.	Faculty of Psychology and Education	Fakulti Psikologi dan Pendidikan	–	9	1	1
11.	Faculty of Science and Technology	Fakulti Sains dan Sumber Alam	–	9	3	1
12.	Faculty of Food Science and Nutrition	Fakulti Sains Makanan dan Pemakanan	–	4	8	4
13.	Faculty of Social Science and Humanities	Fakulti Sains Sosial dan Kemanusiaan	–	6	6	4
14.	Institute of Tropical Biology and Conservation	Institut Biologi Tropika dan Pemuliharaan	–	–	4	2
15.	Biology Research Institute	Institut Penyelidikan Bioteknologi	–	–	1	1
16.	Borneo Marine Research Institute	Institut Penyelidikan Marin Borneo	–	–	4	3
17.	Preparatory Centre for Science and Technology	Pusat Persediaan Sains & Teknologi	5	–	–	–
18.	Centre for the Promotion of Knowledge and Language Learning	Pusat Penataran Ilmu dan Bahasa	–	–	3	2

=== Reputation and rankings ===
University rankings
- Universiti Malaysia Sabah

Global – Overall
- QS World: 1001–1200 (2025)
- THE World: =1501 (2024)
- USNWR Global: =1573 (2025)

Regional – Overall
- QS Asia: 243 (2025)
- USNWR Asia: =595 (2025)

UMS consistently ranks top 20 in Malaysia. UMS usually ranks 1000–1500th globally by QS World University Rankings, Times Higher Education World University Rankings, US News and World Report University Ranking since 2019

== Gallery ==
Universiti Malaysia Sabah

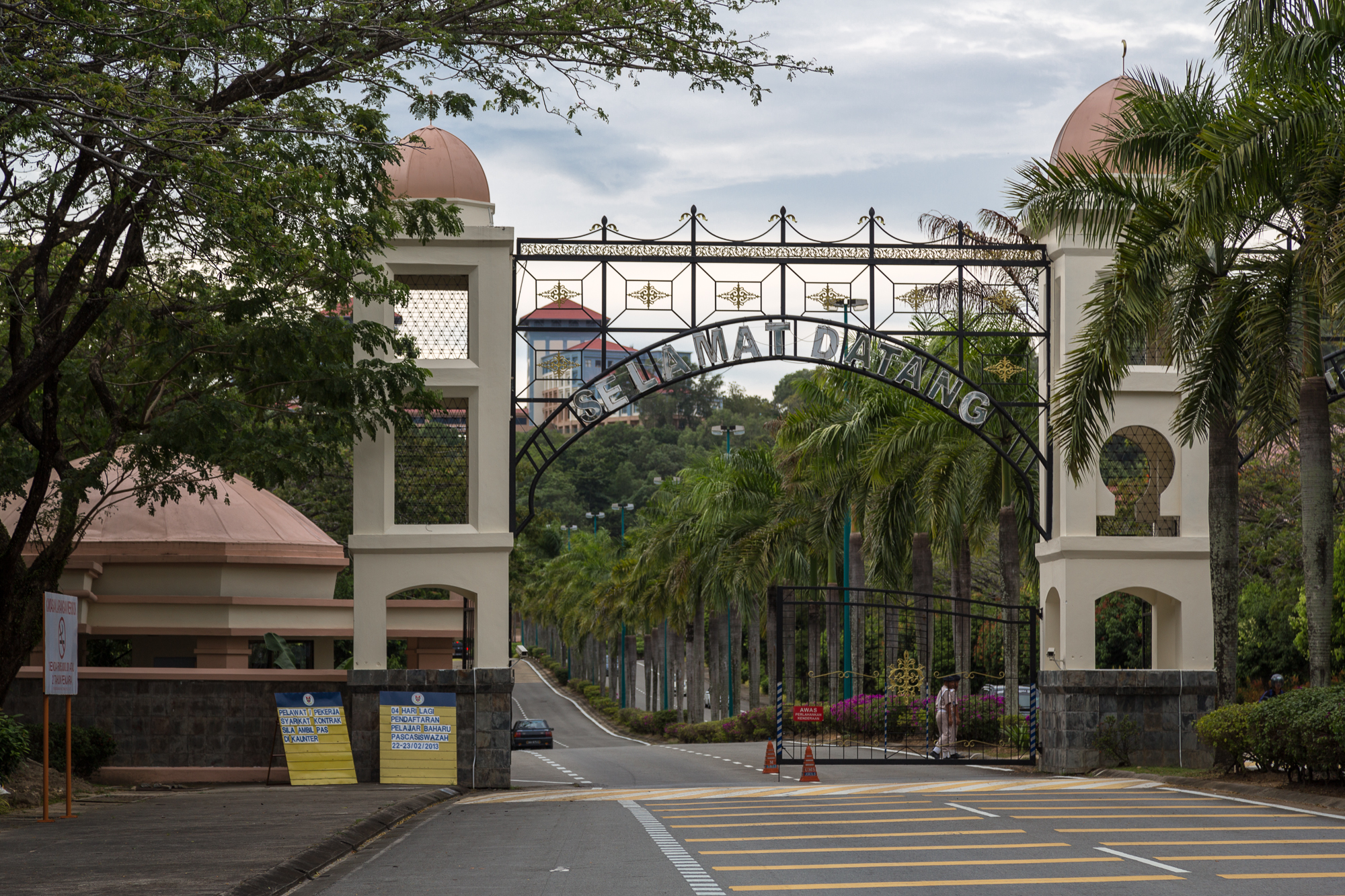
Main Gate

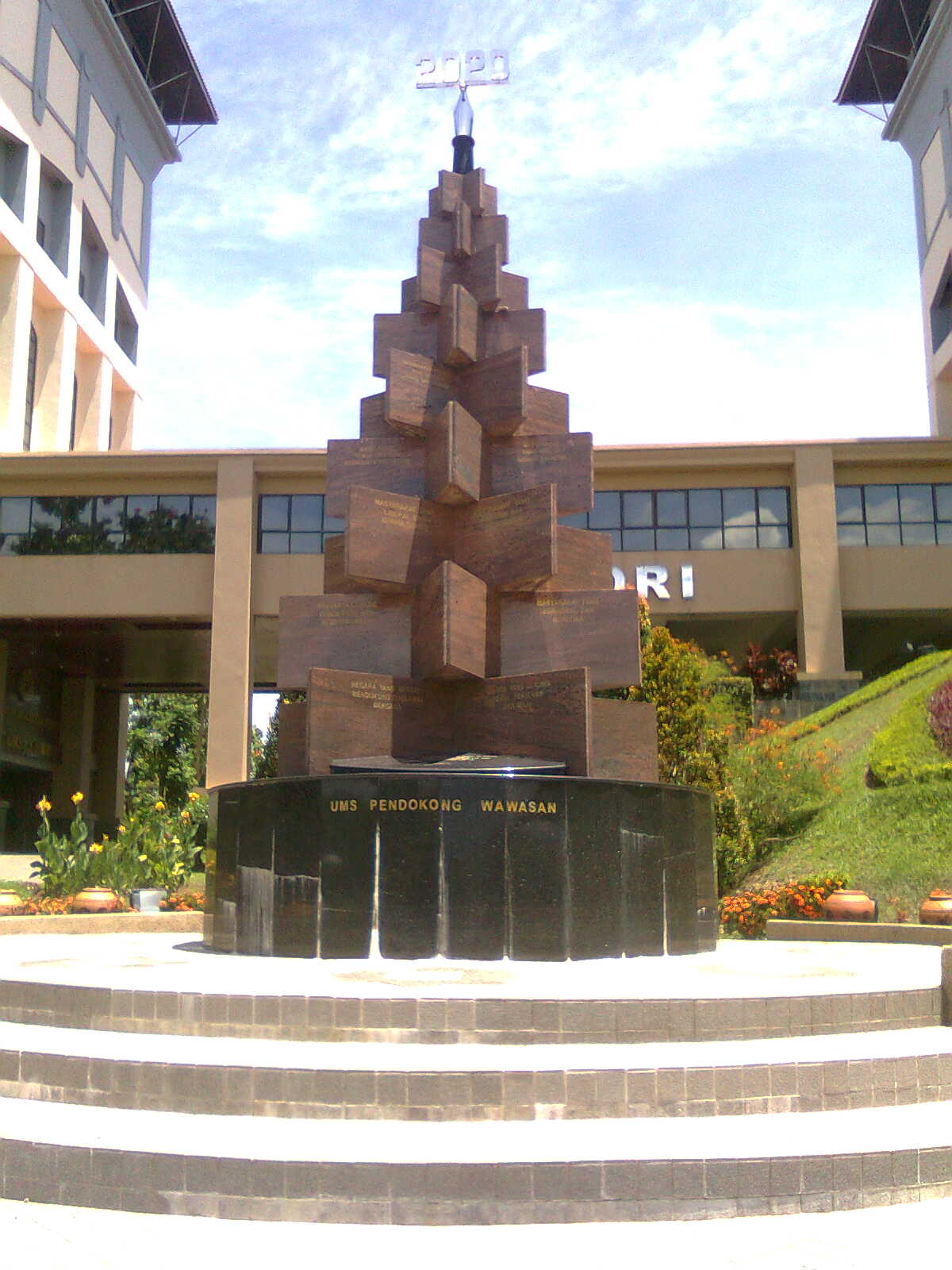
Statue of 2020 Vision

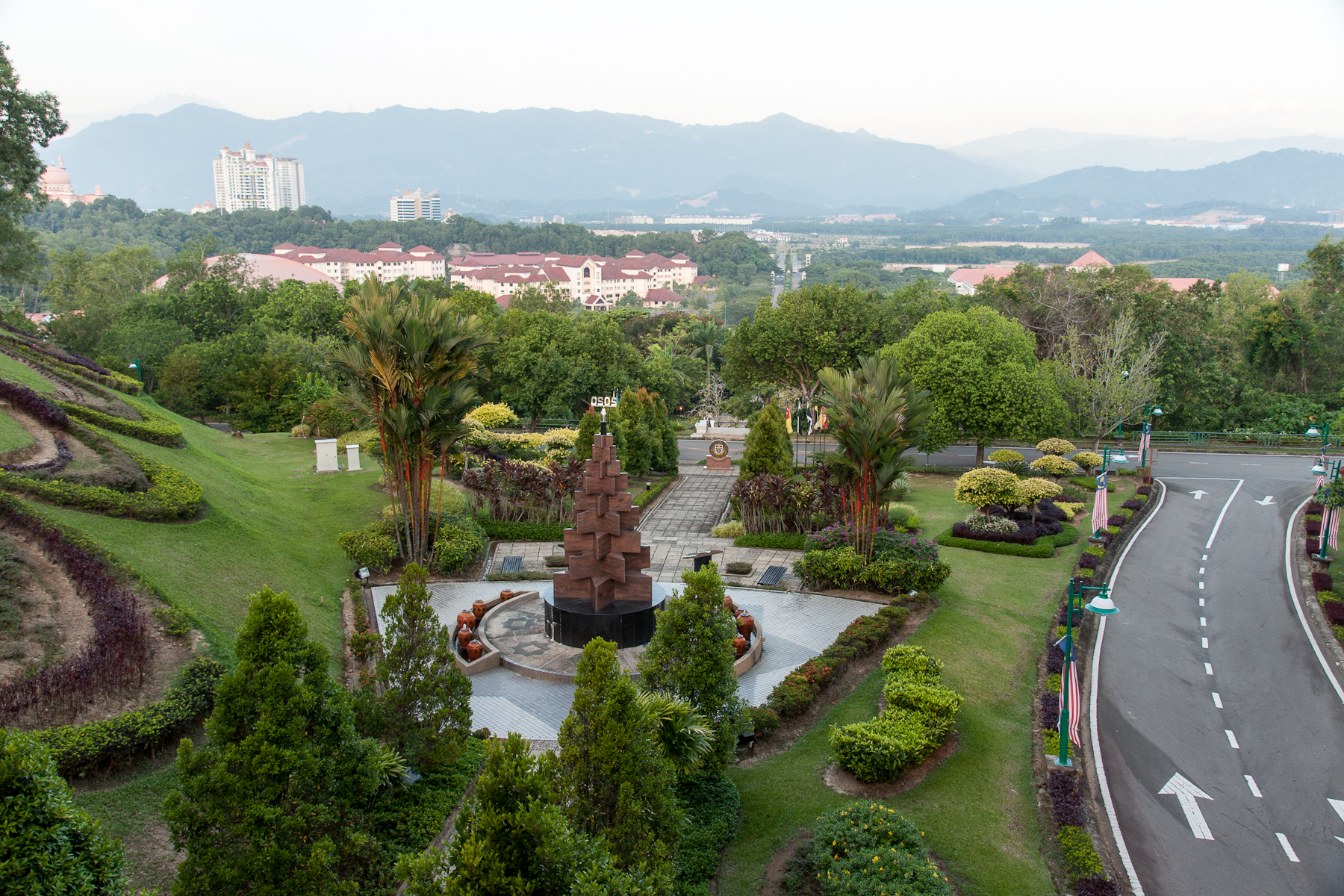
Chancellery Office

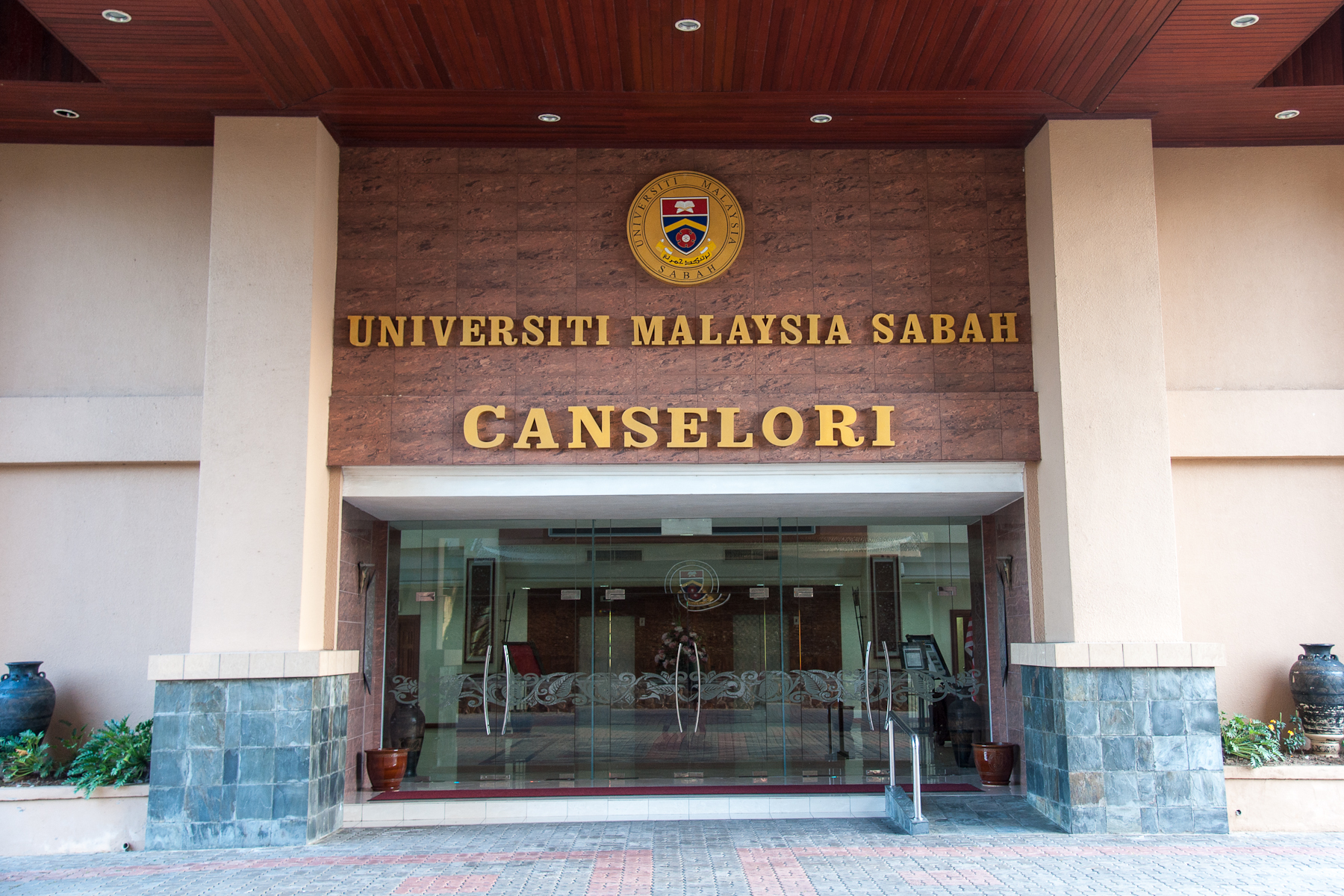
Chancellery Office

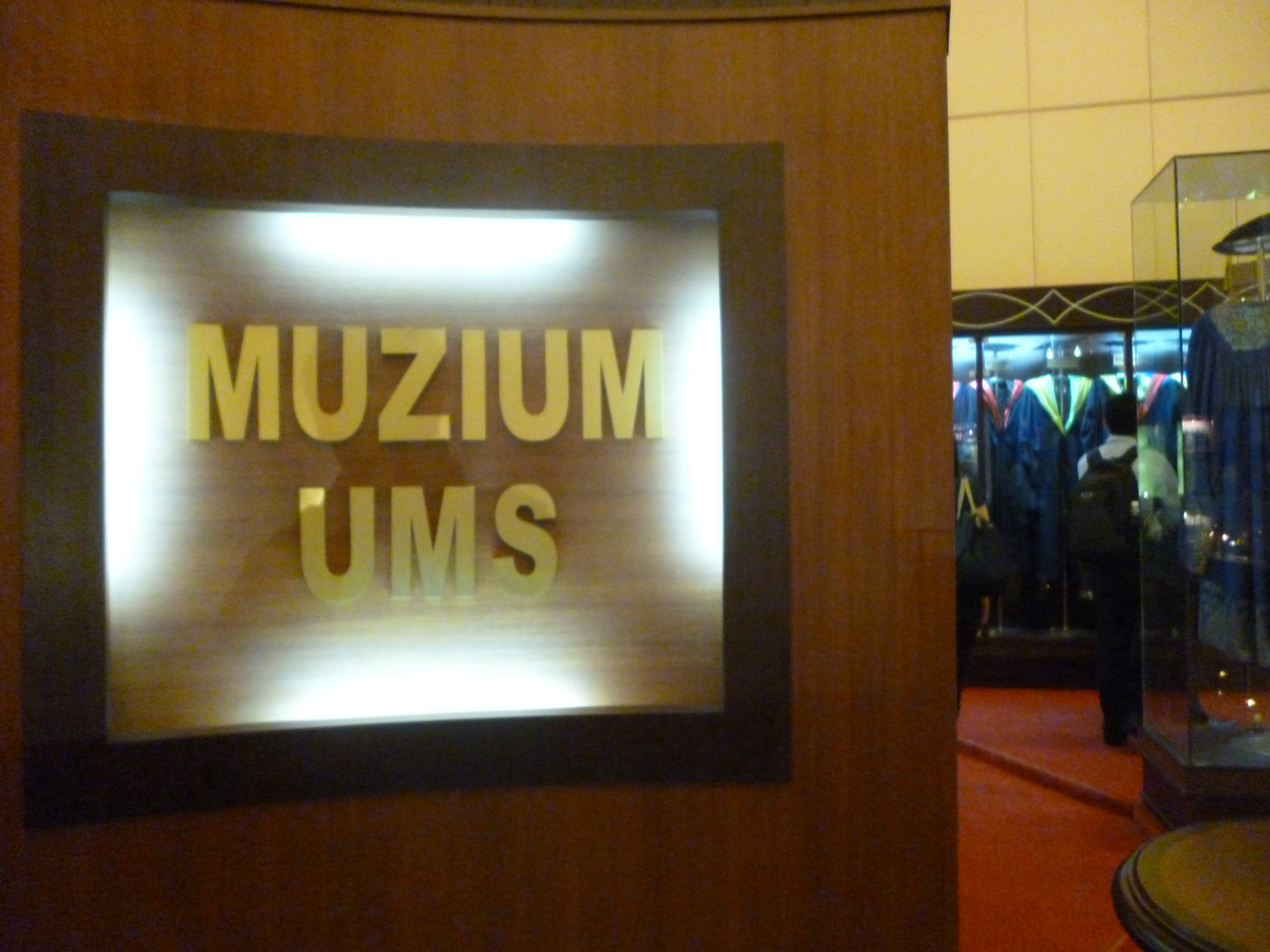
Museum

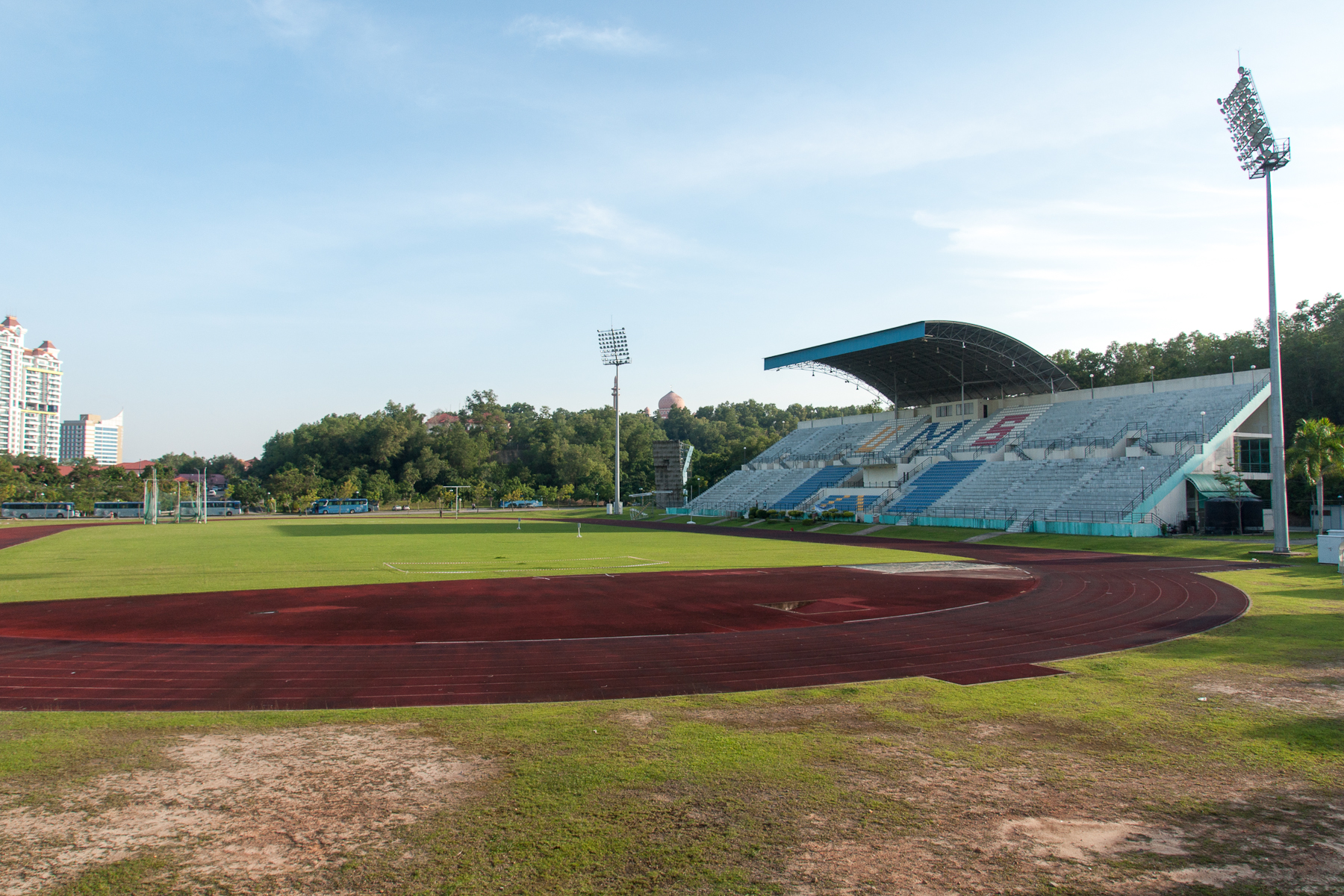
Sports complex

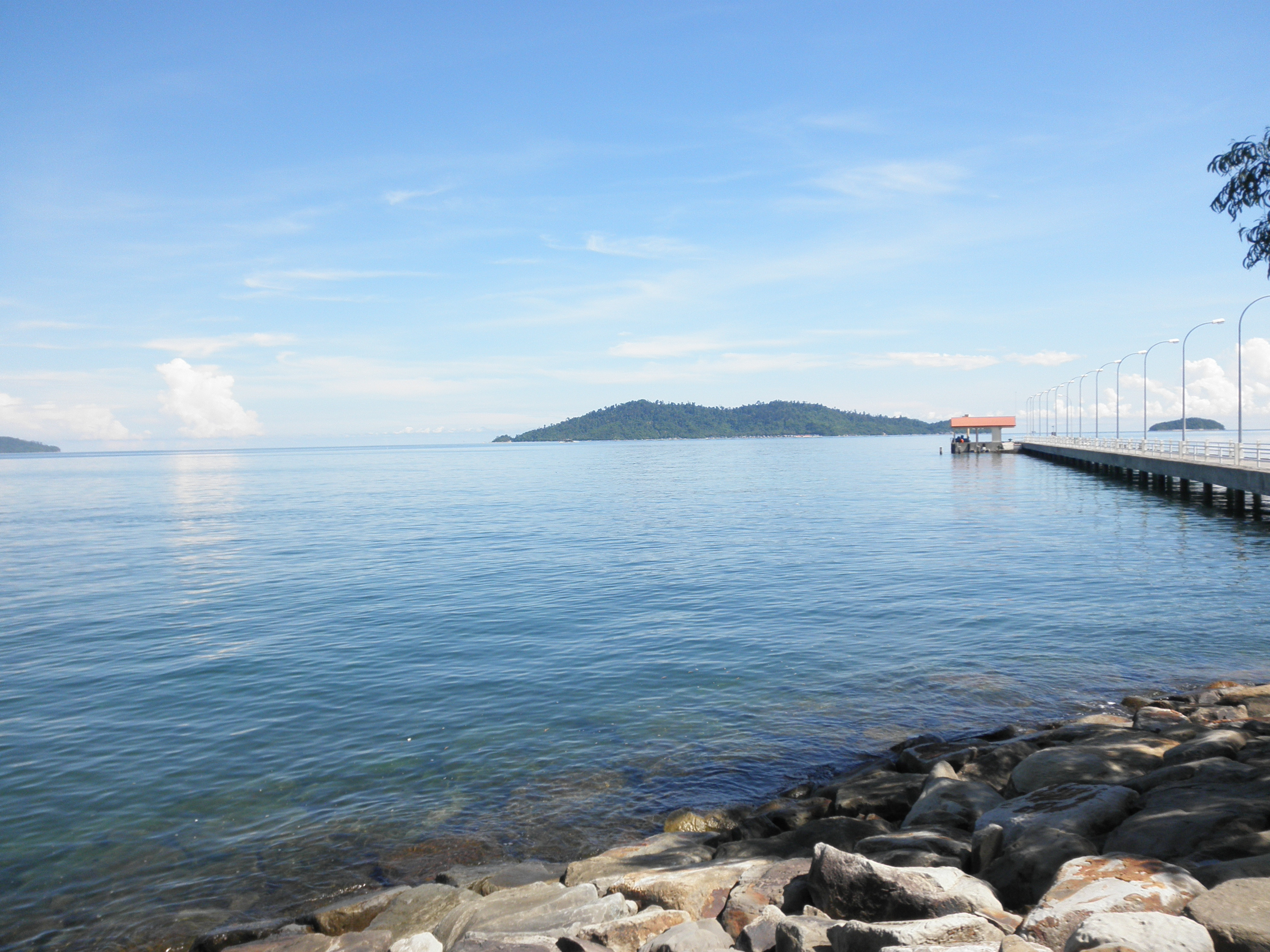
Beach of Outdoor Development Centre (ODEC)

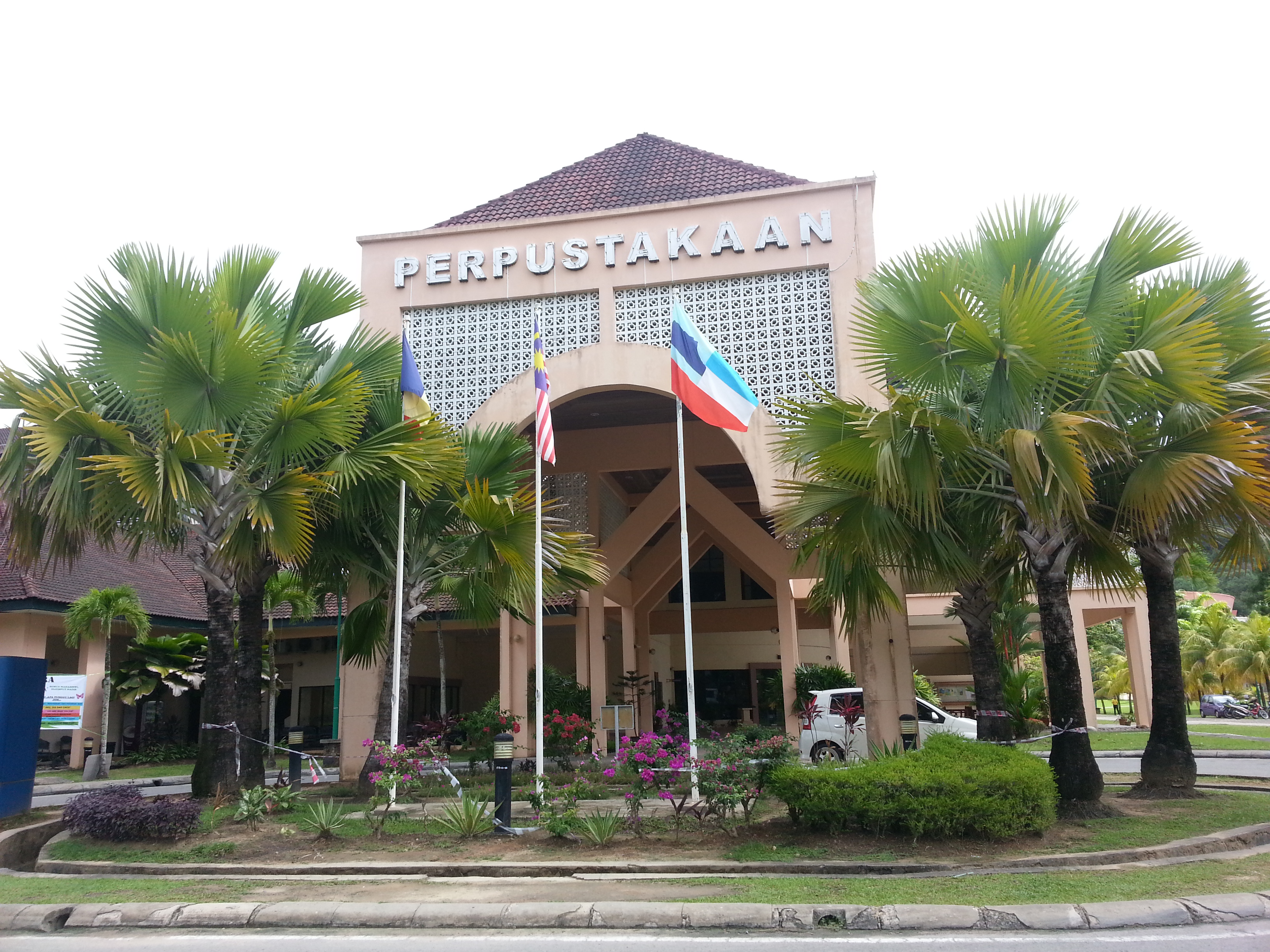
Library

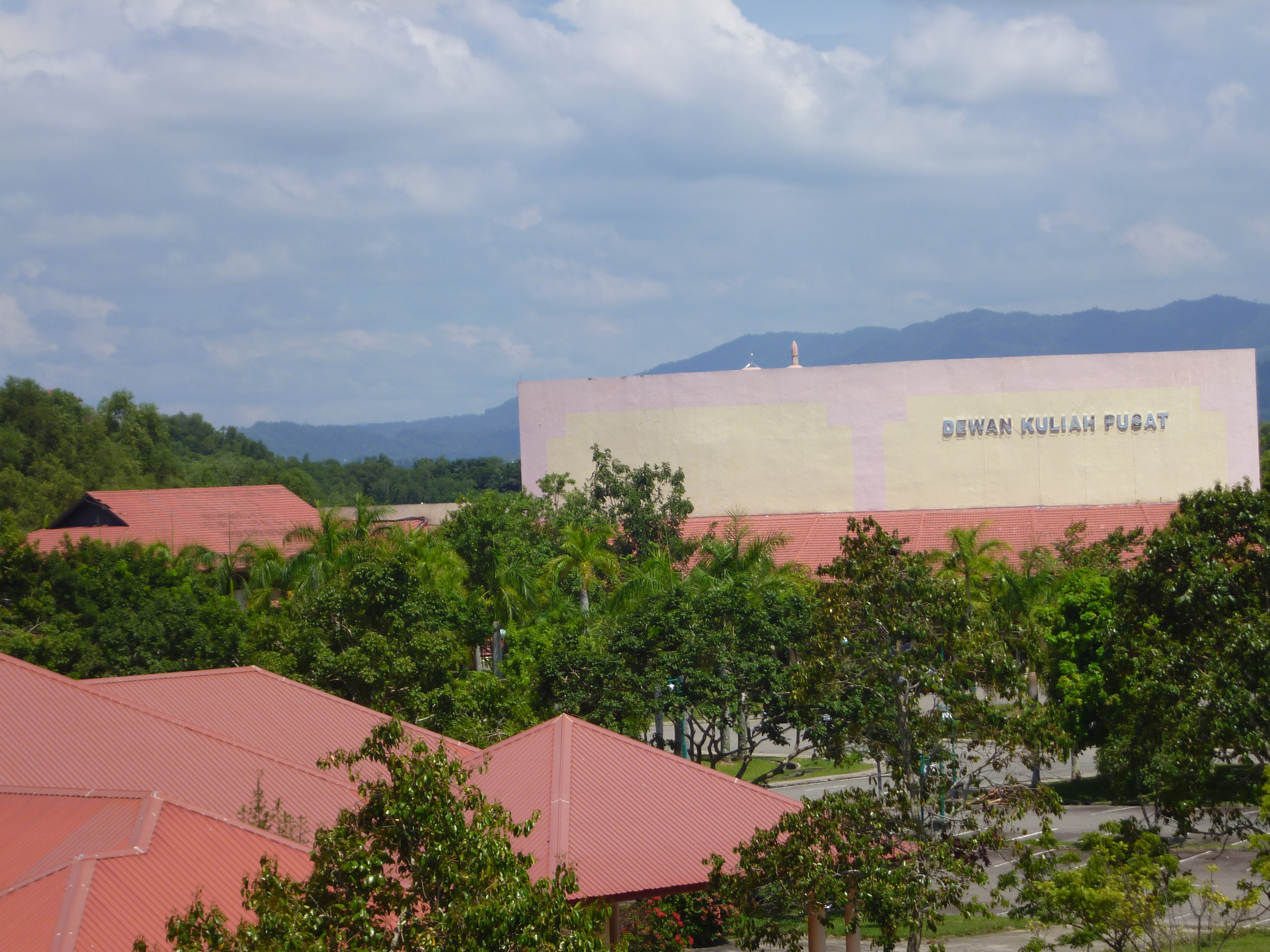
Lecture Hall (Dewan Kuliah Pusat)

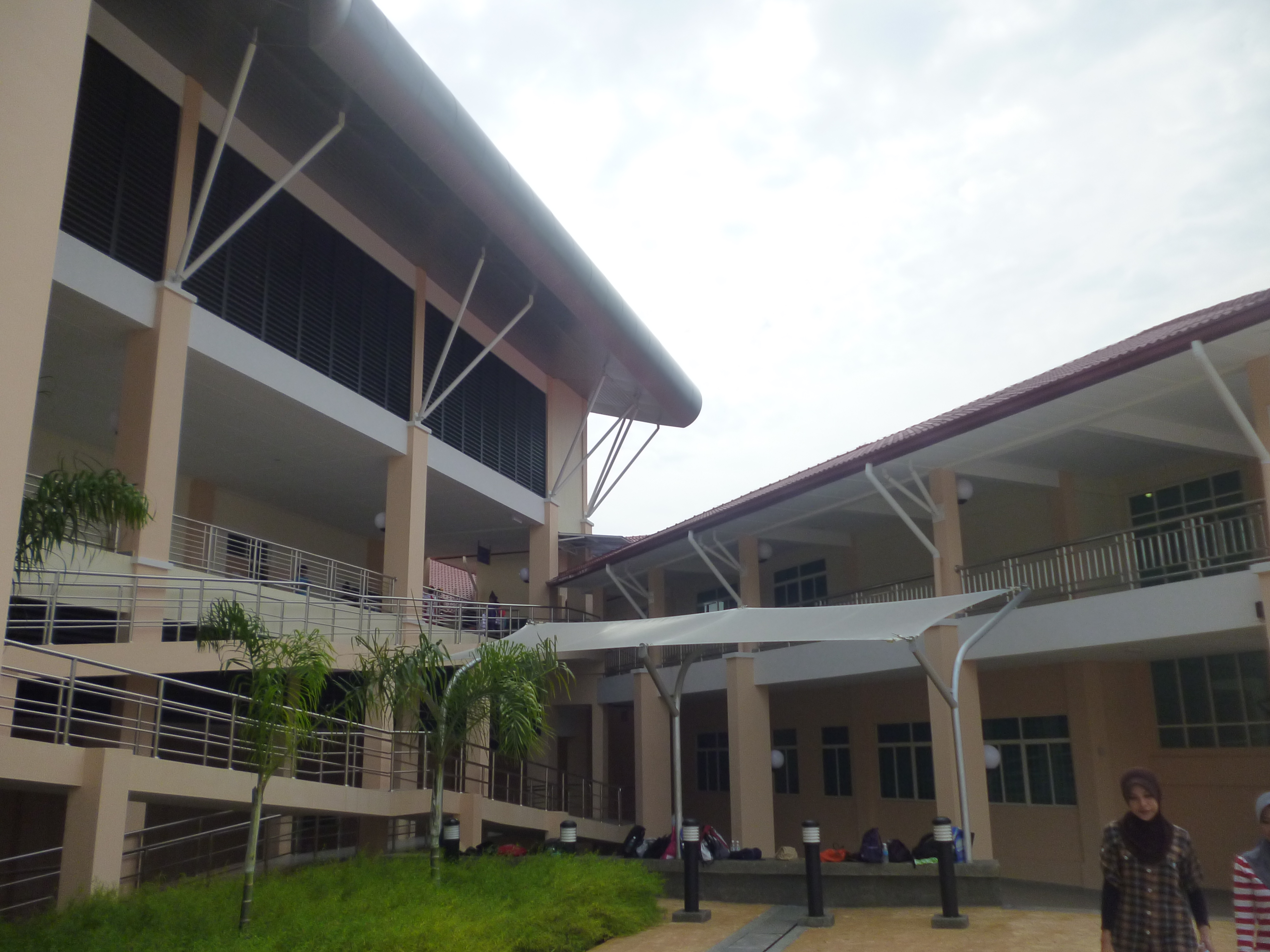
2nd Lecture Hall (Dewan Kuliah Pusat Ke-2)

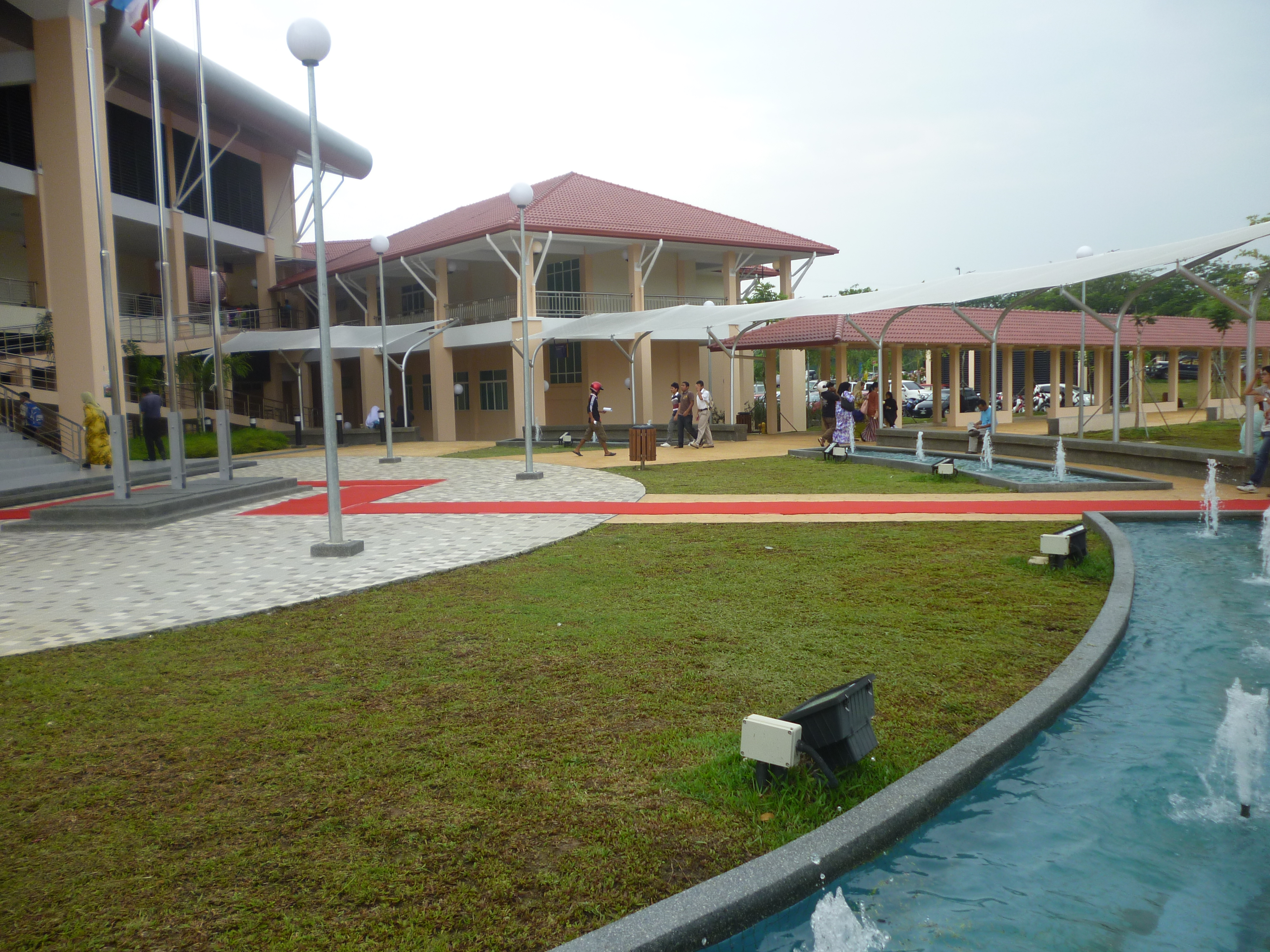
Water front of 2nd Lecture Hall (Dewan Kuliah Pusat Ke-2)

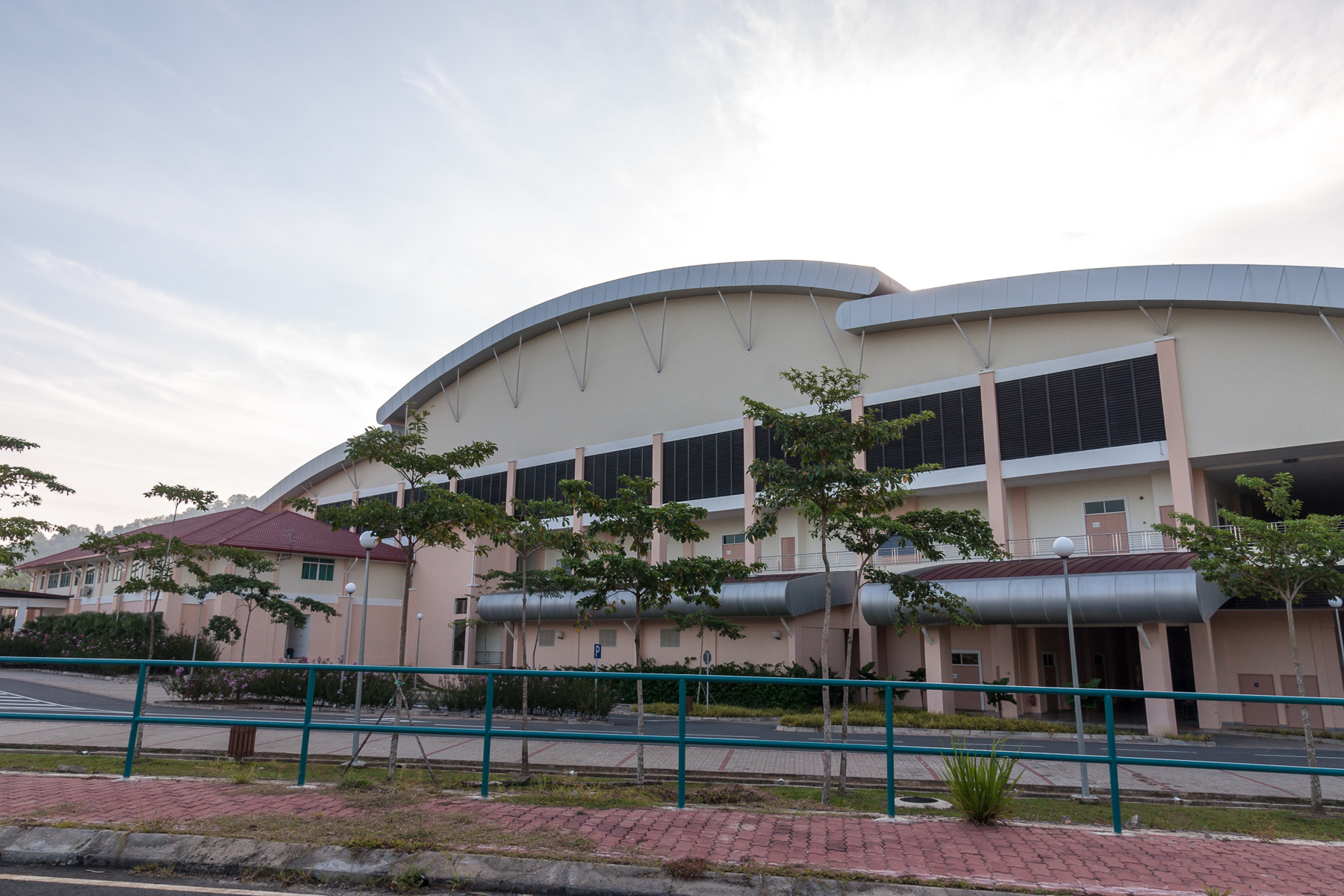
2nd Lecture Hall (Dewan Kuliah Pusat Ke-2)

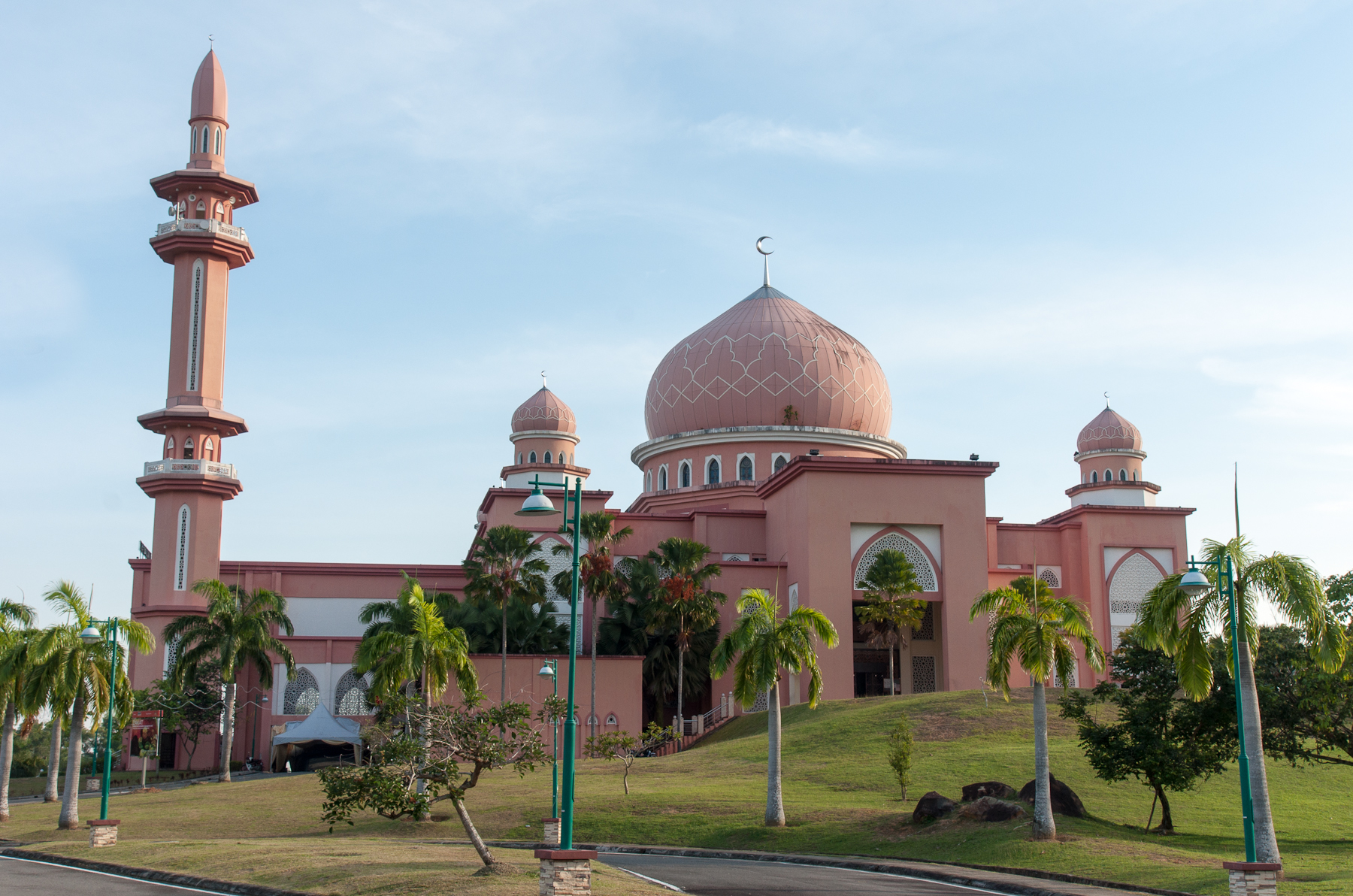
UMS mosque

== See also ==
- Institute for Tropical Biology and Conservation
- List of Islamic educational institutions
