= Bukit Mertajam (federal constituency) =

Malaysian federal constituency

Bukit Mertajam (P045)
Penang constituency

Federal constituency
- Legislature: Dewan Rakyat
- MP: Steven Sim Chee Keong; PH
- Constituency created: 1974
- First contested: 1974
- Last contested: 2022

Demographics
- Population (2020): 162,947
- Electors (2023): 121,615
- Area (km²): 78
- Pop. density (per km²): 2,089.1

Bukit Mertajam is a federal constituency in Central Seberang Perai District, Penang, Malaysia, that has been represented in the Dewan Rakyat since 1974.

The federal constituency was created in the 1974 redistribution and is mandated to return a single member to the Dewan Rakyat under the first past the post voting system.

== Demographics ==
Ethnic breakdown of Bukit Mertajam's electorate as of 2022
1. Chinese (67.4%)
2. Malay (21.7%)
3. Indian (10.7%)
4. Other ethnicities (0.30%)

As of 2020, Bukit Mertajam has a population of 162,947 people.

Age breakdown of Bukit Mertajam's electorate as of 2022
1. 18-20 (5.93%)
2. 21-29 (20.1%)
3. 30-39 (20.0%)
4. 40-49 (17.6%)
5. 50-59 (15.3%)
6. 60-69 (12.3%)
7. 70-79 (6.52%)
8. 80-89 (1.96%)
9. above 90 (0.31%)
Gender breakdown of Bukit Mertajam's electorate as of 2022
1. Male (48.9%)
2. Female (51.1%)

== History ==
=== Polling districts ===
According to the federal gazette issued on 18 July 2023, the Bukit Mertajam constituency is divided into 26 polling districts.

State constituency	Polling District	Code	Location
Berapit (N13)	Kampong Aston	045/13/01	SM Persendirian Jit Sin
Berapit (N13)	Bukit Noning	045/13/02	SJK (C) Perkampungan Berapit
Berapit (N13)	Taman Bukit Ria	045/13/03	SJK (C) Kim Sen
Berapit (N13)	Kampong Bahru	045/13/04	SK Kampung Bahru
Berapit (N13)	Jalan Berjaya	045/13/05	SMK Bukit Mertajam
Berapit (N13)	Taman Alma	045/13/06	SMK Jalan Damai
Berapit (N13)	Mutiara Indah	045/13/07	SMK Berapit
Berapit (N13)	Taman Tenang	045/13/08	SM Sains Tun Syed Sheh Shahabudin
Machang Bubuk (N14)	To' Kun	045/14/01	SK Juara
Machang Bubuk (N14)	Machang Bubok	045/14/02	SK Machang Bubok
Machang Bubuk (N14)	Bukit Teh	045/14/03	SK Bukit Teh
Machang Bubuk (N14)	Alma	045/14/04	SJK (C) Sin Ya
Machang Bubuk (N14)	Taman Seri Kijang	045/14/05	SK Alma Jaya
Machang Bubuk (N14)	Bukit Minyak	045/14/06	SK Bukit Minyak
Machang Bubuk (N14)	Permatang Tinggi	045/14/07	SJK (C) Permatang Tinggi; SJK (T) Permatang Tinggi
Machang Bubuk (N14)	Gajah Mati	045/14/08	SMA Al-Mahadul Islami
Machang Bubuk (N14)	Taman Jambu	045/14/09	SJK (C) Kay Sin
Machang Bubuk (N14)	Taman Seri Janggus	045/14/10	SMK Taman Sejahtera; SMK Machang Bubuk
Machang Bubuk (N14)	Taman Alma Jaya	045/14/11	SK Taman Impian
Padang Lalang (N15)	Kampong Cross Street 1	045/15/01	SK Sungai Rambai
Padang Lalang (N15)	Station Road	045/15/02	SMK Convent (M) Bukit Mertajam
Padang Lalang (N15)	High School	045/15/03	SMK Tinggi Bukit Mertajam
Padang Lalang (N15)	Bukit Kechil	045/15/04	SJK (C) Keow Kuang
Padang Lalang (N15)	Desa Damai	045/15/05	SMJK Jit Sin
Padang Lalang (N15)	Taman Keenways	045/15/06	SK Alma; SJK (C) Beng Teik (Pusat)
Padang Lalang (N15)	Taman Binjai	045/15/07	SMJK Jit Sin

=== Representation history ===
Members of Parliament for Bukit Mertajam
Parliament	No	Years	Member	Party	Vote Share
Constituency created from Seberang Tengah
4th	P038	1974–1978	Tan Cheng Bee (陈清美)	BN (MCA)	14,285; 61.75%
5th	P038	1978–1982	Seow Hun Khim (萧汉钦)	DAP	13,051; 40.59%
6th	P038	1982–1986	Seow Hun Khim (萧汉钦)	BN (MCA)	22,226; 55.94%
7th	P042	1986–1990	Chian Heng Kai (陈庆佳)	DAP	19,099; 50.27%
8th	P042	1990–1995	Chian Heng Kai (陈庆佳)	GR (DAP)	21,572; 51.57%
9th	P045	1995–1999	Tan Chong Keng (陈从德)	BN (MCA)	30,175; 62.54%
10th	P045	1999–2004	Chong Eng (章瑛)	BA (DAP)	26,874; 52.89%
11th	P045	2004–2008	Chong Eng (章瑛)	DAP	26,215; 59.76%
12th	P045	2008–2013	Chong Eng (章瑛)	PR (DAP)	37,882; 75.97%
13th	P045	2013–2015	Steven Sim Chee Keong (沈志强)	PR (DAP)	55,877; 81.35%
13th	P045	2015–2018	Steven Sim Chee Keong (沈志强)	PH (DAP)	55,877; 81.35%
14th	P045	2018–2022	Steven Sim Chee Keong (沈志强)	PH (DAP)	63,784; 85.40%
15th	P045	2022–present	Steven Sim Chee Keong (沈志强)	PH (DAP)	71,722; 77.33%

=== State constituency ===
Parliamentary constituency	State constituency						
Parliamentary constituency	1955–1959*	1959–1974	1974–1986	1986–1995	1995–2004	2004–2018	2018–present
Bukit Mertajam				Berapit			
Bukit Mertajam			Bukit Tengah				
Bukit Mertajam			Machang Bubuk				
Bukit Mertajam						Padang Lalang	
Bukit Mertajam			Pekan Bukit Mertajam				

=== Historical boundaries ===
State Constituency	Area				
State Constituency	1974	1984	1994	2003	2018
Berapit		Berapit; Jalan Kampung Besar; Jalan Kulim; Kampung Aston; Kampung Cross Street	Berapit; Jalan Kampung Besar; Jalan Kulim; Jalan Maju; Kampung Aston	Berapit; Jalan Damai; Jalan Kulim; Jalan Maju; Kampung Aston	
Bukit Tengah	Bukit Minyak; Bukit Tengah; Juru; Seberang Jaya; Sungai Sembilang	Bukit Minyak; Juru; Kampun Tok Kangar; Kampung Sungai Rambai; Sungai Sembilang	Bukit Minyak; Bukit Tengah; Juru; Kampung Sungai Rambai; Sungai Sembilang		
Machang Bubuk	Alma; Cherok Tok Kun; Kampung Binjai; Kampung Tongkang; Permatang Tinggi		Alma; Cherok Tok Kun; Jalan Damai; Kampung Binjai; Permatang Tinggi	Alma; Cherok Tok Kun; Kampung Binjai; Machang Bubok; Permatang Tinggi	
Padang Lalang				Jalan Nangka; Jalan Song Ban Kheng; Kampung Sungai Rambai; Padang Lalang; Taman Tan Sai Gin	
Pekan Bukit Mertajam	Berapit; Jalan Kulim; Kampung Aston; Kampung Cross Street; Kampung Sungai Rambai				

=== Current state assembly members ===
No.	State Constituency	Member	Coalition (Party)
N13	Berapit	Heng Lee Lee	PH (DAP)
N14	Machang Bubuk	Lee Khai Loon	PH (PKR)
N15	Padang Lalang	Daniel Gooi Zi Sen	PH (DAP)

=== Local governments & postcodes ===
No.	State Constituency	Local Government	Postcode
N13	Berapit	Seberang Perai City Council	14000,14020 Bukit Mertajam
N14	Machang Bubok	Seberang Perai City Council	14000,14020 Bukit Mertajam
N15	Padang Lalang	Seberang Perai City Council	14000,14020 Bukit Mertajam

== Election results ==
Malaysian general election, 2022
Party	Candidate	Votes	%	∆%
PH	Steven Sim Chee Keong	71,722	77.33	▲77.33
PN	Steven Koh Tien Yew	14,037	15.14	▲15.14
BN	Tan Yang Pang	6,986	7.53	▼7.07
Total valid votes		92,745	100.00	
Total rejected ballots		767		
Unreturned ballots		183		
Turnout		93,695	77.50	▼7.87
Registered electors		120,819		
Majority		57,685	62.19	▼8.61
PH hold		Swing		
Source(s) "Federal Government Gazette - Results of Contested Election and Statements of the Poll after the Official Addition of Votes, Parliamentary Constituencies for the State of Penang [P.U. (B) 609/2022]" (PDF). Attorney General's Chambers of Malaysia. 2022-12-14.

Malaysian general election, 2018
Party	Candidate	Votes	%	∆%
PKR	Sim Chee Keong	63,784	85.40	▲85.40
BN	Gui Guat Lye	10,907	14.60	▼4.05
Total valid votes		74,691	100.00	
Total rejected ballots		1,109		
Unreturned ballots		177		
Turnout		75,977	85.37	▼2.72
Registered electors		88,998		
Majority		52,877	70.80	▲8.10
PKR hold		Swing		
Source(s) "Federal Government Gazette - Notice of Contested Election, Parliament for the State of Penang [P.U. (B) 236/2018]" (PDF). Attorney General's Chambers of Malaysia. 3 May 2018. "Federal Government Gazette - Results of Contested Election and Statements of the Poll after the Official Addition of Votes, Parliamentary Constituencies for the State of Penang [P.U. (B) 310/2018]" (PDF). Attorney General's Chambers of Malaysia. 28 May 2018.

Malaysian general election, 2013
Party	Candidate	Votes	%	∆%
DAP	Sim Chee Keong	55,877	81.35	▲5.38
BN	Gui Guat Lye	12,814	18.65	▼5.38
Total valid votes		68,691	100.00	
Total rejected ballots		712		
Unreturned ballots		185		
Turnout		69,588	88.09	▲8.78
Registered electors		78,996		
Majority		43,063	62.70	▲10.76
DAP hold		Swing		
Source(s) "Federal Government Gazette - Notice of Contested Election, Parliament for the State of Penang [P.U. (B) 173/2013]" (PDF). Attorney General's Chambers of Malaysia. 26 April 2013. "Federal Government Gazette - Results of Contested Election and Statements of the Poll after the Official Addition of Votes, Parliamentary Constituencies for the State of Penang [P.U. (B) 214/2013]" (PDF). Attorney General's Chambers of Malaysia. 22 May 2013.

Malaysian general election, 2008
Party	Candidate	Votes	%	∆%
DAP	Chong Eng	37,882	75.97	▲16.21
BN	Ong Tang Chuan	11,985	24.03	▼16.21
Total valid votes		49,867	100.00	
Total rejected ballots		931		
Unreturned ballots		25		
Turnout		50,823	79.31	▲1.94
Registered electors		64,080		
Majority		25,897	51.94	▲32.42
DAP hold		Swing		

Malaysian general election, 2004
Party	Candidate	Votes	%	∆%
DAP	Chong Eng	26,215	59.76	▲6.87
BN	Ma Kok Ben	17,651	40.24	▼6.87
Total valid votes		43,866	100.00	
Total rejected ballots		1,148		
Unreturned ballots		428		
Turnout		45,442	77.37	▼0.65
Registered electors		58,733		
Majority		8,564	19.52	▲13.74
DAP hold		Swing		

Malaysian general election, 1999
Party	Candidate	Votes	%	∆%
DAP	Chong Eng	26,874	52.89	▲15.43
BN	Tan Chong Keng	23,937	47.11	▼15.43
Total valid votes		50,811	100.00	
Total rejected ballots		1,107		
Unreturned ballots		49		
Turnout		51,967	78.02	▼0.49
Registered electors		66,607		
Majority		2,937	5.78	▼19.30
DAP gain from BN		Swing		?

Malaysian general election, 1995
Party	Candidate	Votes	%	∆%
BN	Tan Chong Keng	30,175	62.54	▲14.11
DAP	Teoh Teik Huat	18,077	37.46	▼14.11
Total valid votes		48,252	100.00	
Total rejected ballots		1,315		
Unreturned ballots		92		
Turnout		49,659	78.51	▼0.48
Registered electors		63,251		
Majority		12,098	25.08	▲21.94
BN gain from DAP		Swing		?

Malaysian general election, 1990
Party	Candidate	Votes	%	∆%
DAP	Chian Heng Kai @ Chin Soo Ha	21,572	51.57	▲1.30
BN	Tan Chong Keng	20,260	48.43	▲1.91
Total valid votes		41,832	100.00	
Total rejected ballots		1,098		
Unreturned ballots		0		
Turnout		42,930	78.99	▲2.99
Registered electors		54,350		
Majority		1,312	3.14	▼0.61
DAP hold		Swing		

Malaysian general election, 1986
Party	Candidate	Votes	%	∆%
DAP	Chian Heng Kai @ Chin Soo Ha	19,099	50.27	▲6.21
BN	Tan Chong Keng	17,673	46.52	▼9.42
NASMA	Tan Chin Ceang	1,219	3.21	▲3.21
Total valid votes		37,991	100.00	
Total rejected ballots		1,100		
Unreturned ballots		0		
Turnout		39,091	76.00	▼0.61
Registered electors		51,437		
Majority		1,426	3.75	▼8.13
DAP gain from BN		Swing		?

Malaysian general election, 1982
Party	Candidate	Votes	%	∆%
BN	Seow Hun Khim	22,226	55.94	▲25.12
DAP	Khoo Chin Tow	17,506	44.06	▲3.47
Total valid votes		39,732	100.00	
Total rejected ballots		1,119		
Unreturned ballots		0		
Turnout		40,851	76.61	▼4.02
Registered electors		53,324		
Majority		4,720	11.88	▲2.11
BN gain from DAP		Swing		?

Malaysian general election, 1978
Party	Candidate	Votes	%	∆%
DAP	Seow Hun Khim	13,051	40.59	▲18.55
BN	Lee Jong Ki	9,910	30.82	▼30.93
PAS	Shaik Adam	4,757	14.80	▲14.80
Independent	Tan Cheng Bee	4,082	12.70	▲12.70
Homeland Consciousness Union	Mustapha Hussain	350	1.09	▼4.25
Total valid votes		32,150	100.00	
Total rejected ballots		1,123		
Unreturned ballots		0		
Turnout		33,273	80.63	▼2.96
Registered electors		41,243		
Majority		3,141	9.77	▼29.94
DAP gain from BN		Swing		?

Malaysian general election, 1974
Party	Candidate	Votes	%
BN	Tan Cheng Bee	14,285	61.75
DAP	Oh Teck Aun	5,098	22.04
PEKEMAS	Michael Tan Kok Haw	1,479	6.39
Homeland Consciousness Union	Mustapha Hussain	1,235	5.34
Parti Rakyat Malaysia	Ong Cheng Piaw	1,035	4.47
Total valid votes		23,132	100.00
Total rejected ballots		1,027	
Unreturned ballots		0	
Turnout		24,159	83.59
Registered electors		28,902	
Majority		9,187	39.71
This was a new constituency created.
