= Yeoh Soon Hin =

Malaysian politician

Yang Berbahagia Dato' Yeoh Soon Hin DSPN
- 杨顺兴

Chairman of the Penang Port Commission
- Incumbent
- Assumed office 20 February 2024
- Minister: Anthony Loke Siew Fook
- Preceded by: Tan Teik Cheng

Deputy Chairman of the Tourism Malaysia
- Incumbent
- Assumed office October 2023
- Minister: Tiong King Sing
- Chairman: Yasmin Mahmood

Member of the Penang State Executive Council (Tourism, Arts, Culture and Heritage)
- In office 16 May 2018 – 13 August 2023
- Governor: Abdul Rahman Abbas (2018–2021); Ahmad Fuzi Abdul Razak (2021–2023)
- Chief Minister: Chow Kon Yeow
- Preceded by: Law Heng Kiang (Tourism & Culture); Chong Eng (Arts)
- Succeeded by: Wong Hon Wai (Tourism); Portfolios abolished (Arts & Culture)
- Constituency: Paya Terubong

Member of the Penang State Legislative Assembly for Paya Terubong
- In office 8 March 2008 – 12 August 2023
- Preceded by: Loh Hock Hun (BN–MCA)
- Succeeded by: Wong Hon Wai (PH–DAP)
- Majority: 11,121 (2008); 25,719 (2013); 31,189 (2018)

Personal details
- Born: Yeoh Soon Hin; 20 September 1976 (age 49) Penang, Malaysia
- Citizenship: Malaysian
- Party: Democratic Action Party (DAP)
- Other political affiliations: Barisan Alternatif (BA) (1999–2004); Pakatan Rakyat (PR) (2008–2015); Pakatan Harapan (PH) (since 2015)
- Occupation: Politician

Yeoh Soon Hin

Chinese name
- Traditional Chinese: 楊順興
- Simplified Chinese: 杨顺兴
Transcriptions
Standard Mandarin
- Hanyu Pinyin: Yáng Shùnxīng
Yue: Cantonese
- Jyutping: Joeng4 Seon6 Hing1
Southern Min
- Hokkien POJ: Iôⁿ Sūn-heng
- Tâi-lô: Iônn Sūn-hing

Yeoh Soon Hin (born 20 September 1976) is a Malaysian politician who has served as chairman of the Penang Port Commission (PPC) since February 2024 and Deputy Chairman of the Tourism Malaysia since October 2023. He served as Member of the Penang State Executive Council (EXCO) in the Pakatan Harapan (PH) state administration under Chief Minister Chow Kon Yeow from May 2018 to August 2023 and Member of the Penang State Legislative Assembly (MLA) for Paya Terubong from March 2008 to August 2023. He was appointed to the position in March 2020 following a cabinet reshuffle by the Penang Chief Minister Chow Kon Yeow. Prior to his appointment as minister, Yeoh Soon Hin served as a state assemblyman for the Pulau Tikus constituency in Penang. He is a member of the Democratic Action Party (DAP), a major political party in Malaysia, and has been actively involved in politics since 2008.

== Election results ==
Penang State Legislative Assembly
Year	Constituency	Candidate	Votes	Pct	Opponent(s)	Votes	Pct	Ballots cast	Majority	Turnout
2004	N34 Paya Terubong	Yeoh Soon Hin (DAP)	8,380	46.17%	Loh Hock Hun (MCA)	9,772	53.83%	18,418	1,392	78.41%
2008	N34 Paya Terubong	Yeoh Soon Hin (DAP)	16,848	74.63%	Koh Wan Leong (MCA)	5,727	25.37%	22,832	11,121	80.44%
2013	N34 Paya Terubong	Yeoh Soon Hin (DAP)	30,295	86.88%	Koh Wan Leong (MCA)	4,576	13.12%	35,176	25,719	88.80%
2018	N34 Paya Terubong	Yeoh Soon Hin (DAP)	35,315	88.59%	Wong Chin Chong (MCA)	4,126	10.35%	40,185	31,189	86.00%
2018	N34 Paya Terubong	Yeoh Soon Hin (DAP)	35,315	88.59%	Kuan Aun Wan (MUP)	421	1.06%	40,185	31,189	86.00%

== Honours ==
- Penang
  - Officer of the Order of the Defender of State (DSPN) – Dato' (2023)
