= Ong Kok Fooi =

Malaysian politician

Yang Berbahagia Dato' Ong Kok Fooi DSPN
- 王国慧

Member of the Penang State Executive Council
- In office 13 March 2008 – 8 May 2013
- Governor: Abdul Rahman Abbas
- Chief Minister: Lim Guan Eng
- Portfolio: Youth and Sports, Women, Family and Community Development
- Succeeded by: Chong Eng
- Constituency: Berapit

Member of the Penang State Legislative Assembly for Berapit
- In office 8 March 2008 – 9 May 2018
- Preceded by: Lau Chiek Tuan (BN–MCA)
- Succeeded by: Heng Lee Lee (PH–DAP)
- Majority: 4,692 (2008); 14,765 (2013)

Personal details
- Born: Ong Kok Fooi; 19 April 1965 (age 60) Negeri Sembilan, Malaysia
- Party: Democratic Action Party (DAP)
- Other political affiliations: Pakatan Rakyat (PR) (2008–2015); Pakatan Harapan (PH) (since 2015)
- Occupation: Politician

Ong Kok Fooi (Chinese: 王国慧; born 19 April 1965) is a Malaysian politician who served as Member of the Penang State Executive Council (EXCO) in the Pakatan Rakyat (PR) state administration under former Chief Minister Lim Guan Eng from March 2008 to May 2013 as well as Member of the Penang State Legislative Assembly (MLA) for Berapit from March 2008 to May 2018. She is a member of the Democratic Action Party (DAP), a component party of the Pakatan Harapan (PH) and formerly PR coalitions.

In 2015, she announced that she would not contest in upcoming state election. In line with her announcement in 2015, she did not contest in the Penang state election and retired from politics in 2018.

== Election results ==
Penang State Legislative Assembly
| Year | Constituency | Candidate | Votes | Pct | Opponent(s) | Votes | Pct | Ballots cast | Majority | Turnout |
|---|---|---|---|---|---|---|---|---|---|---|
| 2008 | N13 Berapit | Ong Kok Fooi (DAP) | 10,006 | 65.30% | Lau Chiek Tuan (MCA) | 5,314 | 34.70% | 15,530 | 4,692 | 78.10% |
| 2013 | N13 Berapit | Ong Kok Fooi (DAP) | 16,995 | 88.40% | Lau Chiek Tuan (MCA) | 2,230 | 11.60% | 19,390 | 14,765 | 86.60% |

== Honours ==
- Penang
  - Officer of the Order of the Defender of State (DSPN) – Dato' (2020)
