= Indera Mahkota =

Indera Mahkota may refer to:

- Indera Mahkota (federal constituency), Kuantan District, Pahang, Malaysia
  - Bandar Indera Mahkota, a township in Kuantan, Pahang
- Indera Mahkota (state constituency), a former state constituency in Pahang
