= Sim Chon Siang =

Malaysian politician

Yang Berhormat Tuan Sim Chon Siang MLA
- 沈春祥

Member of the Pahang State Executive Council
- Incumbent
- Assumed office 2 December 2022
- Monarch: Abdullah
- Menteri Besar: Wan Rosdy Wan Ismail
- Portfolio: Consumer Affairs and Human Resources (Note: Assumed portfolios 12 days after taking office.)
- Preceded by: Nazri Ngah (Consumer Affairs); Mohd Johari Hussain (Human Resources)
- Constituency: Teruntum

Member of the Pahang State Legislative Assembly for Teruntum
- Incumbent
- Assumed office 5 May 2013
- Preceded by: Chang Hong Seong (BN–MCA)
- Majority: 4,437 (2013); 7,725 (2018); 8,659 (2022)

Kuantan PKR Branch Deputy Chief
- Incumbent
- Assumed office 2022

Personal details
- Born: 1966 (age 59–60) Johor
- Party: People's Justice Party (PKR)
- Other political affiliations: Pakatan Harapan (PH)
- Occupation: Politician

Sim Chon Siang is a Malaysian politician who served as Member of the Pahang State Executive Council (EXCO) in the Barisan Nasional (BN) state administration under Menteri Besar Wan Rosdy Wan Ismail since December 2022 and Member of the Pahang State Legislative Assembly (MLA) for Teruntum since May 2013. He is a member, State Vice Chairman and Deputy Branch Chief of Kuantan of the People's Justice Party (PKR), a component party of the Pakatan Harapan (PH) and formerly Pakatan Rakyat (PR) coalitions. He is one of the only two Pahang EXCO Members of PH and Chinese ethnicity alongside Triang MLA Leong Yu Man.

== Political career ==
=== Member of the Pahang State Executive Council (since 2022) ===
The 2022 Pahang state election elected a hung Pahang State Legislative Assembly for the first time in the history of the state. Jelai MLA Wan Rosdy of BN was reappointed as the Menteri Besar after BN and PH formed a coalition state government on 28 November 2022. On 2 December 2022, Sim was appointed as Pahang EXCO Member by Menteri Besar Wan Rosdy. 12 days later on 14 December 2022, Sim assumed the portfolios of Consumer Affairs and Human Resources, taking over the former two portfolios from former Pulau Tawar MLA Nazri Ngah and the latter one portfolio from former Tioman MLA Mohd Johari Hussain.

=== Member of the Pahang State Legislative Assembly (since 2013) ===
==== 2013 Pahang state election ====
In the 2013 Pahang state election, Sim made his electoral debut after being nominated by PR to contest for the Teruntum state seat. Sim is contesting against Chang Hong Seong of Barisan Nasional. He won the seat by gaining 12,385 votes with the majority of 4,437.

==== 2018 Pahang state election ====
In the 2018 Pahang state election, Sim was renominated by PH to contest for the Teruntum state seat. Sim is contesting against Tee Choon Ser of Barisan Nasional and Azizah Mohd Ali of Malaysian Islamic Party. He successfully defend the seat by gaining 12,227 votes with the majority of 7,725.

==== 2022 Pahang state election ====
In the 2022 Pahang state election, Sim was renominated by PH to contest for the Teruntum state seat. Sim is contesting against Tee Choon Ser of Barisan Nasional, Yap Kim Heng of Perikatan Nasional and Khairul Afifie Abdullah of Homeland Fighter's Party. He successfully defend the seat by gaining 12,983 votes with the majority of 8,659.

== Election results ==
Pahang State Legislative Assembly
Year	Constituency	Candidate	Votes	Pct	Opponent(s)	Votes	Pct	Ballots cast	Majority	Turnout
2013	N14 Teruntum	Sim Chon Siang (PKR)	12,385	60.91%	Chang Hong Seong (MCA)	7,948	39.09%	20,650	4,437	82.07%
2018	N14 Teruntum	Sim Chon Siang (PKR)	12,227	61.85%	Tee Choon Ser (MCA)	4,502	22.77%	20,207	7,725	81.66%
2018	N14 Teruntum	Sim Chon Siang (PKR)	12,227	61.85%	Azizah Mohd Ali (PAS)	3,039	15.37%	20,207	7,725	81.66%
2022	N14 Teruntum	Sim Chon Siang (PKR)	12,983	58.63%	Tee Choon Ser (MCA)	4,304	19.44%	22,377	8,659	72.53%
2022	N14 Teruntum	Sim Chon Siang (PKR)	12,983	58.63%	Yap Kim Heng (Gerakan)	3,676	16.60%	22,377	8,659	72.53%
2022	N14 Teruntum	Sim Chon Siang (PKR)	12,983	58.63%	Khairul Afifie Abdullah (PEJUANG)	1,180	5.33%	22,377	8,659	72.53%
