= Tan Hock Leong =

Malaysian politician

Yang Berbahagia Dato' Tan Hock Leong DSPN
- 陈福良

Deputy Speaker of the Penang State Legislative Assembly
- In office 2008–2013
- Yang di-Pertua of Penang: Abdul Rahman Abbas
- Chief Minister: Lim Guan Eng
- Speaker: Abdul Halim Hussain
- Succeeded by: Maktar Shapee
- Constituency: Machang Bubok

Member of the Penang State Legislative Assembly for Machang Bubok
- In office 8 March 2008 – 5 May 2013
- Preceded by: Toh Kin Woon (BN–Gerakan)
- Succeeded by: Lee Khai Loon (PR–PKR)
- Majority: 4,080 (2008)

Personal details
- Born: 26 September 1955 (age 71) Kedah, Federation of Malaya
- Party: People's Justice Party (PKR) (–2013); Independent (2013–present)
- Other political affiliations: Pakatan Rakyat (PR) (2008–2013)
- Occupation: Politician

Tan Hock Leong (born 26 September 1955) is Malaysian politician who has served as Member of the Penang State Legislative Assembly (MLA) for Machang Bubok from March 2008 to May 2013.

Tan Hock Leong announced exit PKR and contest as an independent in 2013 general election and fail to retain seat.

== Election results ==
Penang State Legislative Assembly
Year	Constituency	Candidate	Votes	Pct	Opponent(s)	Votes	Pct	Ballots cast	Majority	Turnout
2008	N14 Machang Bubok	Tan Hock Leong (PKR)	11,002	61.40%	Lee Kah Choon (Gerakan)	6,922	38.60%	18,279	4,080	81.50%
2013	N14 Machang Bubok	Tan Hock Leong (IND)	172	0.60%	Lee Khai Loon (PKR)	19,080	70.68%	27,465	11,900	89.26%
2013	N14 Machang Bubok	Tan Hock Leong (IND)	172	0.60%	Tan Lok Heah (Gerakan)	7,180	26.60%	27,465	11,900	89.26%
2013	N14 Machang Bubok	Tan Hock Leong (IND)	172	0.60%	Wan Balkis Wan Abdullah (IND)	252	0.93%	27,465	11,900	89.26%
2013	N14 Machang Bubok	Tan Hock Leong (IND)	172	0.60%	Vikneswaran Muniandy (KITA)	159	0.59%	27,465	11,900	89.26%
2013	N14 Machang Bubok	Tan Hock Leong (IND)	172	0.60%	Ooi Suan Hoe (IND)	152	0.56%	27,465	11,900	89.26%

== Honours ==
- Penang
  - Officer of the Order of the Defender of State (DSPN) – Dato' (2010)
