= Tan Tee Beng =

Malaysian politician

- 陈智铭

Member of the Malaysian Parliament for Nibong Tebal, Penang
- In office 2008–2013
- Preceded by: Zainal Abidin Osman
- Succeeded by: Mansor Othman

Personal details
- Born: 21 February 1972 (age 54) Penang, Malaysia
- Citizenship: Malaysian
- Party: GERAKAN (until 2000); PKR (2007–2010); Independent (2010-2011, 2012-2026); KITA (2011-2012); WAWASAN (since 2026)
- Education: Middlesex University
- Occupation: Politician

Chinese name
- Simplified Chinese: 陈智铭
- Traditional Chinese: 陳智銘
- Hanyu Pinyin: Chén Zhìmíng
- Hokkien POJ: Tân Tìbêng

Tan Tee Beng (Chinese: 陈智铭; born 21 February 1972) is a Malaysian politician from WAWASAN. From 2008 to 2013 he was the Member of the Parliament of Malaysia for the Nibong Tebal constituency in Penang, Malaysia.

Tan was elected to Parliament in the 2008 general election for the opposition National Justice Party (KeADILan) which later changed to People's Justice Party (PKR) party, unseating Zainal Abidin Osman, a government Minister. On 1 March 2010, Tan announced he was leaving PKR to sit as an independent member of Parliament. His resignation from PKR followed the instigation of disciplinary action against him by the party after he criticised Penang Chief Minister Lim Guan Eng from the party's Pakatan Rakyat coalition partner the Democratic Action Party. Tan has later announced he joined Parti Kesejahteraan Insan Tanah Air (KITA) on 24 February 2011. But he was sacked from KITA on 7 February 2012 allegedly for making statement disparaging the party. Tan contested as an independent candidate in a four-corner fight for Nibong Tebal parliamentary seat in the 2018 general election but lost. In 2026, Tan Tee Bing was announced as the Central Committee member of the newly formed WAWASAN party.

Tan's father, Datuk Tan Gim Hwa, was a founding member of the Parti Gerakan Rakyat Malaysia (GERAKAN), a coalition party of the ruling Barisan Nasional (BN) government), and even Tan himself before joining PKR is a former official in Gerakan's youth wing. He was the GERAKAN's candidate for the Penang State Legislative Assembly seat of Batu Lancang in the 1999 general election which he lost by a slim majority.

Before entering politics, Tan was a stockbroker. He obtained a Bachelor of Laws from Middlesex University.

== Election results ==
Penang State Legislative Assembly
Year	Constituency	Candidate	Votes	Pct	Opponent(s)	Votes	Pct	Ballots cast	Majority	Turnout
1999	N27 Batu Lancang	Tan Tee Beng (Gerakan)	7,251	49.05%	Law Heng Kiang (DAP)	7,532	50.95%	15,104	281	74.37%

Parliament of Malaysia
Year	Constituency	Candidate	Votes	Pct	Opponent(s)	Votes	Pct	Ballots cast	Majority	Turnout
2008	P047 Nibong Tebal	Tan Tee Beng (PKR)	20,210	54.13%	Zainal Abidin Osman (UMNO)	17,123	45.87%	38,129	3,087	80.20%
2018	P047 Nibong Tebal	Tan Tee Beng (IND)	331	0.53%	Mansor Othman (PKR)	45,929	55.18%	63,199	15,817	86.12%
2018	P047 Nibong Tebal	Tan Tee Beng (IND)	331	0.53%	Shaik Hussein Mydin (UMNO)	28,035	33.68%	63,199	15,817	86.12%
2018	P047 Nibong Tebal	Tan Tee Beng (IND)	331	0.53%	Mohd Helmi Haron (PAS)	8,173	9.82%	63,199	15,817	86.12%

== See also ==
- Nibong Tebal (federal constituency)
