= Nazri Ngah =

Malaysian politician

Yang Berbahagia Dato' Nazri Ngah DSAP DIMP
- ناذري بن ڠاه

Member of the Pahang State Executive Council
- In office 15 May 2018 – 28 November 2022 (FELDA Affairs, Co-operatives, Entrepreneurships and Consumer Affairs)
- Monarchs: Ahmad Shah (2018–2019); Abdullah (since 2019)
- Menteri Besar: Wan Rosdy Wan Ismail
- Preceded by: Shahiruddin Ab Moin (Co-operatives, Entrepreneurships and Consumer Affairs)
- Succeeded by: Razali Kassim (FELDA Affairs, Corporation, Entrepreneurship Development); Sim Chon Siang (Consumer Affairs)
- Constituency: Pulau Tawar

Member of the Pahang State Legislative Assembly for Pulau Tawar
- In office 9 May 2018 – 19 November 2022
- Preceded by: Ahmad Shukri Ismail (BN–UMNO)
- Succeeded by: Yohanis Ahmad (PN–PAS)
- Majority: 587 (2018)

Personal details
- Born: Pahang, Malaysia
- Citizenship: Malaysian
- Party: United Malays National Organisation (UMNO)
- Other political affiliations: Barisan Nasional (BN)
- Occupation: Politician

Nazri bin Ngah is a Malaysian politician and has served as Pahang State Executive Councillor.

== Election results ==
Pahang State Legislative Assembly
Year	Constituency		Votes	Pct	Opponent(s)	Votes	Pct	Ballots cast	Majority	Turnout
2018	N11 Pulau Tawar	Nazri Ngah (UMNO)	8,446	46.21%	Ahmad Naawi Samah (PAS)	7,859	43.00%	18,679	587	80.30%
2018	N11 Pulau Tawar	Nazri Ngah (UMNO)	8,446	46.21%	Jamaluddin Abd Rahim (AMANAH)	1,973	10.79%	18,679	587	80.30%
2022	N11 Pulau Tawar	Nazri Ngah (UMNO)	9,499	39.30%	Yohanis Ahmad (PAS)	12,986	53.73%	24,531	3,487	78.7%
2022	N11 Pulau Tawar	Nazri Ngah (UMNO)	9,499	39.30%	Norani Muhd @ Mohd Arshad (AMANAH)	1,091	4.51%	24,531	3,487	78.7%
2022	N11 Pulau Tawar	Nazri Ngah (UMNO)	9,499	39.30%	Ridzuan Mansor (IND)	544	2.25%	24,531	3,487	78.7%
2022	N11 Pulau Tawar	Nazri Ngah (UMNO)	9,499	39.30%	Mohd Rosidi Hassan (PEJUANG)	50	0.21%	24,531	3,487	78.7%

== Honours ==
- Pahang
  - Knight Companion of the Order of Sultan Ahmad Shah of Pahang (DSAP) – Dato' (2011)
  - Knight Companion of the Order of the Crown of Pahang (DIMP) – Dato' (2008)
