= Indera Mahkota (state constituency) =

Malaysian defunct state constituency

Pahang constituency

Defunct state constituency
- Legislature: Pahang State Legislative Assembly
- Constituency created: 1995
- Constituency abolished: 2004
- First contested: 1995
- Last contested: 1999

Indera Mahkota was a state constituency in Pahang, Malaysia that was represented in the Pahang State Legislative Assembly from 1995 until 2004.

The state constituency was created in the 1995 and is mandated to return a single member to the Pahang State Legislative Assembly under the first past the post voting system.

== History ==
It was abolished in 2004 when it was redistributed.

=== Representation history ===
Members of the Legislative Assembly for Indera Mahkota
Assembly	No	Years	Member	Party
Constituency created from Teruntum
9th	N14	1995–1999	Ti Lian Ker (郑联科)	BN (MCA)
10th	N14	1999–2004	Ti Lian Ker (郑联科)	BN (MCA)
Constituency abolished, renamed to Semambu

== Election results ==
Pahang state election, 1999
Party	Candidate	Votes	%	∆%
BN	Ti Lian Ker	10,439	60.33	▼11.35
PKR	Razali Alias	6,864	39.67	▲39.67
Total valid votes		17,303	100.00	
Total rejected ballots		439		
Unreturned ballots		358		
Turnout		18,100	75.70	▲2.35
Registered electors		23,909		
Majority		3,575	20.66	▼22.71
BN hold		Swing		

Pahang state election, 1995
Party	Candidate	Votes	%
BN	Ti Lian Ker	10,937	71.69
Semangat 46	Abdul Aziz Othman	4,320	28.31
Total valid votes		15,257	100.00
Total rejected ballots		1,136	
Unreturned ballots		0	
Turnout		16,393	73.35
Registered electors		22,349	
Majority		6,617	43.37
This was a new constituency created.
