= Tourism Malaysia =

Malaysian government agency

- Malaysia Tourism Promotion Board; Lembaga Penggalakan Pelancongan Malaysia (Malay)

Agency overview
- Formed: 20 May 1992; 34 years ago
- Preceding agency: Tourist Development Corporation of Malaysia (TDC)
- Jurisdiction: Government of Malaysia
- Headquarters: No. 2, 9th Floor, Tower 1, Jalan P5/6, Precinct 5, 62200 Putrajaya, Malaysia.
- Motto: Malaysia Truly Asia
- Agency executives: Yasmin Mahmood, Chairman; Yeoh Soon Hin, Deputy Chairman; Manoharan Periasamy, Director General; Ammar Abd Ghapar, Deputy Director General (Planning)
- Parent agency: Ministry of Tourism, Arts and Culture
- Website: www.malaysia.travel - Consumer www.tourism.gov.my - Corporate

Tourism Malaysia or Malaysia Tourism Promotion Board (MTPB) is an agency under the Ministry of Tourism, Arts and Culture, Malaysia.

Tourism Malaysia, formerly known as the "Tourist Development Corporation of Malaysia (TDC)", was established on 10 August 1972. It was then under the former Ministry of Trade and Industry.

== History ==
The Tourist Development Corporation of Malaysia (TDC) was established on 10 August 1972 as an agency under the former Ministry of Trade and Industry by an Act of Parliament. With the inception of the Ministry of Culture, Arts and Tourism on 20 May 1987, TDC was moved to this new ministry; and became the Malaysia Tourism Promotion Board (MTPB) through the Malaysia Tourism Promotion Board Act 1992. Popularly known as Tourism Malaysia, its full focus is on promoting Malaysia domestically and internationally. Tourism Malaysia now has 34 overseas and 11 marketing representative offices.

== Promotional efforts ==
In September 2006, Tourism Malaysia signed a £2 million deal with Manchester United in an effort to promote Visit Malaysia Year 2007. Prior to that, Tourism Malaysia had a deal with Chelsea F.C. The success of the Visit Malaysia Year 2007, a celebration of Malaysia's diverse cultures, beautiful holiday locations and unique attractions has helped propel the country to the forefront in tourism. Tourism Malaysia sponsored the Carlton Football Club in the Australian Football League in 2009.

In 2010, Tourism Malaysia announced that it would be making greater efforts to attract New Zealanders. "Initiatives include a greater focus on ecotourism, major cultural events and activities for young urban professionals. Family-friendly destinations, wellness activities, value for money and a safe, clean environment are some the key drivers of this market," said Ng.

The government has started a campaign called "1Malaysia Green, 1Malaysia Clean" in order to let tour operators and travelers understand the need to protect nature areas while promoting eco-tourism.

In 2016, Tourism Malaysia stated 'Besides mass tourists, we are also trying to focus on niche tourism products such as sports including motoring and others, golfing, bird watching, medical and wellness as well as shopping.' Shopping brings in the highest revenue share at 30 per cent of total tourism revenue in 2015.

== Leadership ==
- Datuk (Dr.) Yasmin Mahmood (Chairman)
- Dato’ Yeoh Soon Hin (Deputy Chairman)
- Datuk Manoharan Periasamy (Director General)
- Datuk Musa Hj. Yusof (Deputy Director General (Promotion I))
- Mr. Lee Thai Hung (Deputy Director General (Promotion II))
- Mr. Shahrin Mokhtar (Deputy Director General (Planning))

== Former leadership ==
- Dato' Ramlan Ibrahim
- Ahmad Shah Hussein Tambakau
- Siew Ka Wei
- Wee Choo Keong
