= Jit Sin =

Schools in Penang, Malaysia

Jit Sin is the name of a group of five schools in Penang, Malaysia.

== History ==
=== Foundation ===
Jit Sin School was originally a free school offered by Hock Teik Cheng Sin Temple (福德正神庙) in 1894 at Market Street, Bukit Mertajam, Penang. The institution's building was several two-story shop lots opposite the Hock Teik Cheng Sin Temple in Pek Kong Cheng. The school is now shops of Sin Guan Lee and Kong Chan at the corner lot. In 1918, the institution's name changed to Jit Sin Primary School and opened on March 2. Prior to its opening, there were over 80 students from first grade to fourth grade.

=== Name Origin ===
Jit Sin School (日新学校) takes its Chinese name from the phrase 日新, a classical expression of continual self‑renewal derived from The Great Learning (苟日新，日日新，又日新). The school’s official histories and anniversary publications record this Confucian inspiration as the rationale for the name. While 日新 is also the baptismal name adopted by Dr. Sun Yat‑sen (孫日新) after his 1884 baptism. Dr. Sun was active in Penang as a revolutionary organizer and fundraiser; Penang served as an important overseas base for his activities (notably the 1910 Penang Conference).

=== Early years ===
On October 10, 1922, all Chinese schools across Malaysia were closed down pursuant to the School Registration Act 1920. The first batch of graduates of Jit Sin Primary School had their graduation ceremony the second year of the closure.

In December 1941, the school was suspended during the Malayan campaign and reopened in 1945 after the Japanese occupation of Malaya. At that time, institutions worked as a whole. Jit Sin Primary School was located at a milk packaging factory on Aston Road. Due to the deprivation of education during war time, education was given for free, and student enrollment increased drastically as a result. For the Jit Sin branch campus, there were over 1,000 students. At the end of 1945, the schools resumed standard operations. Jit Sin Primary School was officially reopened in 1946.

In 1948, the main campus on Market Street was demolished by municipal regulation. Although there were other campuses and schools, they were unable to accommodate the increasing number of students. The new campus was to be built on Aston Road, Bukit Mertajam.

On the National Day of the Republic of China in 1949, Zhong Zhen School and Xin You School were merged into Jit Sin Primary School for unity and development. The date was established as the anniversary of the founding of the school, but it was later changed to October 9.

=== Secondary school ===
Jit Sin Junior High School was officially established in 1950 for the convenience of the primary school's students and the first principal was Zhang Gong Da.

In 1952, 17 classrooms were completed finished in the new campus in Aston Road . For primary school, most classes were transferred to the new campus and shared the same classrooms with junior high.

Lim Lean Teng was invited to the new campus for the opening ceremony on January 12, 1953. The school was not stable within the year for the post of principal until Xing He Nian took office in 1954.

Jit Sin Senior High School was established in 1958. Both primary and high schools were subsidized by government and the administration was separated. The principal of primary school was Deng Meng Fa while the high school was Song Ban Kheng. Several types of school boards were established under education regulations.

In 1959, due to the number of students, the primary school was divided into three campuses with separate administration. The main campuses were at Aston Street and Taman Usahaniaga (then Jit Sin Kindergarten).

=== Jit Sin Primary School (A) & (B) ===
In 1961, after the third phase of construction of Jit Sin High School, the planning of a new primary school campus began. Hock Teik Cheng Sin Temple bought a land at Berapit, Bukit Mertajam with RM 33,750 while Zou Wen Kai donated and built the road. Construction finished in 1963 and the morning session of students from the main campus were transferred to the new campus the next year. Due to the lack of school buses, the students from the other two branch campuses and the afternoon session of main campus remained at their original campuses.

In 1965, all primary school students were transferred to the new campus. The school was split into two administrations because of the enormous number of students, with School A larger than School B.

=== Education Act, 1961 and Jit Sin Independent High School ===
In 1962, under the 1961 Education Act, Jit Sin Primary School became a fully-subsidized Chinese vernacular primary school. Jit Sin High School accepted the offer from government for education restructuring and the school was split into two, with one becoming a full-subsidized Chinese vernacular secondary school, while the other remained a Chinese-medium education school and was established as Jit Sin Independent High School. The school board employed Song Ban Kheng as the principal of Jit Sin High and Chen Tong Xiang for Jit Sin Independent High. Both schools and primary school shared the same campus in Aston Street at that time. Jit Sin Independent Junior High remained at the Aston Street campus while the Jit Sin Independent Senior High students were schooled at the Hokkien Association in Datuk Ooh Chooi Cheng Street near the main campus.

=== Jit Sin Independent High School ===
In 1965, under the new education policy, the primary school examination was abolished. The discontinuation resulted in the shutdown of the junior high school until it reopened in 1975. The school was completed with secondary education in 1977.

In 1984, the school followed the United Chinese School Committees Association of Malaysia's (UCSCAM) curriculum and participated in the UEC test.

After the relocation of Jit Sin High in 1992, Jit Sin Independent High fully owned the school campus on Aston Road.

=== Jit Sin High School ===
Pre-university was established in 1979. The school was completed with secondary school preparatory class to pre-tertiary education.

In 1980, the number of students had exceeded 3,000 and the facilities were inadequate. In 1989, the Minister of Ministry of Education announced that a piece of land at Taman Sri Rambai would be sold to Jit Sin High School as the location of the new school campus. Construction finished in 1992. On December 2, a school opening ceremony at the new campus was held.

== Member schools ==
- Jit Sin High School (Central Seberang Perai)
- Jit Sin Independent High School
- Jit Sin Primary School 'A'
- Jit Sin Primary School 'B'
- Jit Sin Kindergarten
