= Ong Ah Teong =

Malaysian politician

Yang Berhormat Tuan Ong Ah Teong MLA
- 王耶宗

Member of the Penang State Legislative Assembly for Batu Lancang
- Incumbent
- Assumed office 9 May 2018
- Preceded by: Law Heng Kiang (PR–DAP)
- Majority: 18,208 (2018); 19,931 (2023)

Personal details
- Born: Ong Ah Teong; 26 June 1970 (age 55) Malaysia
- Citizenship: Malaysian
- Party: Democratic Action Party (DAP)
- Other political affiliations: Pakatan Harapan (PH)
- Occupation: Politician

Ong Ah Teong

Chinese name
- Traditional Chinese: 王耶宗
- Simplified Chinese: 王耶宗
Transcriptions
Standard Mandarin
- Hanyu Pinyin: Wáng Yézōng

Ong Ah Teong (Chinese: 王耶宗; pinyin: Wáng Yézōng; born 26 June 1970) is a Malaysian politician who has served as Member of the Penang State Legislative Assembly (MLA) for Batu Lancang since May 2018. He is a member of the Democratic Action Party (DAP), a component party of the Pakatan Harapan (PH) coalition.

== Politics ==
Ong was a member of Penang Island City Council before being nominated to contest in the 2018 Penang state election. He is currently the Chairman of DAP Solok Batu Lancang branch and Communication Secretary for DAP Jelutong division.

== Election results ==
Penang State Legislative Assembly
Year	Constituency	Candidate	Votes	Pct.	Opponent(s)	Votes	Pct.	Ballots cast	Majority	Turnout
2018	N31 Batu Lancang	Ong Ah Teong (DAP)	20,615	89.00%	Koo Pei Chee (Gerakan)	2,407	10.40%	23,370	18,208	85.20%
2018	N31 Batu Lancang	Ong Ah Teong (DAP)	20,615	89.00%	Kee Lean Ee (MUP)	139	0.60%	23,370	18,208	85.20%
2023	N31 Batu Lancang	Ong Ah Teong (DAP)	21,796	92.10%	Mohd Aswaad Jaafar (Gerakan)	1,865	7.90%	23,848	19,931	72.04%

== Health ==
Ong tested positive for COVID-19 the second time during the 2023 Penang state election campaign.
