= Tan Teik Cheng =

Malaysian politician

Yang Berbahagia Datuk Tan Teik Cheng DPSM
- 陈德钦

Vice President of the Malaysian Chinese Association
- Incumbent
- Assumed office 4 November 2018 Serving with Lim Ban Hong (since 2018) & Ti Lian Ker (2018–2023) & Yew Teong Look (2018–2023) & Wee Jeck Seng (since 2023) & Lawrence Low Ah Keong (since 2023)
- President: Wee Ka Siong
- Preceded by: Lee Chee Leong

Member of the Penang State Legislative Assembly for Padang Lalang
- In office 21 March 2004 – 8 March 2008
- Preceded by: Position established
- Succeeded by: Tan Cheong Heng (PR–DAP)
- Majority: 535 (2004)

Personal details
- Born: Tan Teik Cheng; 17 March 1961 (age 65) Penang, Federation of Malaya (now Malaysia)
- Party: Malaysian Chinese Association (MCA)
- Other political affiliations: Barisan Nasional (BN)
- Occupation: Politician

Tan Teik Cheng (born 17 March 1961) is a Malaysian politician who served as Member of the Penang State Legislative Assembly (MLA) for Padang Lalang from March 2004 to March 2008. He is a member and State Chairman of Penang of the Malaysian Chinese Association (MCA), a component party of the Barisan Nasional (BN) coalition. He has also served as the Vice President of MCA since November 2018.

== Election results ==
Penang State Legislative Assembly
| Year | Constituency | Candidate | Votes | Pct | Opponent(s) | Votes | Pct | Ballots cast | Majority | Turnout |
|---|---|---|---|---|---|---|---|---|---|---|
| 2004 | N15 Padang Lalang | Tan Teik Cheng (MCA) | 7,567 | 51.83% | Tan Kim Hooi (DAP) | 7,032 | 48.17% | 14,850 | 535 | 75.56% |
| 2008 | N15 Padang Lalang | Tan Teik Cheng (MCA) | 6,279 | 37.38% | Tan Cheong Heng (DAP) | 10,520 | 62.62% | 17,009 | 4,241 | 78.16% |
| 2013 | N15 Padang Lalang | Tan Teik Cheng (MCA) | 3,727 | 16.65% | Chong Eng (DAP) | 18,657 | 83.35% | 22,550 | 14,930 | 87.30% |
| 2018 | N14 Machang Bubuk | Tan Teik Cheng (MCA) | 4,658 | 14.73% | Lee Khai Loon (PKR) | 21,819 | 68.98% | 32,138 | 16,747 | 86.25% |
| 2018 | N14 Machang Bubuk | Tan Teik Cheng (MCA) | 4,658 | 14.73% | Md Jamil Abd Rahman (PAS) | 5,072 | 16.04% | 32,138 | 16,747 | 86.25% |
| 2018 | N14 Machang Bubuk | Tan Teik Cheng (MCA) | 4,658 | 14.73% | Tang Ah Ba (PRM) | 53 | 0.17% | 32,138 | 16,747 | 86.25% |
| 2018 | N14 Machang Bubuk | Tan Teik Cheng (MCA) | 4,658 | 14.73% | Lim Jhun Hou (MUP) | 28 | 0.09% | 32,138 | 16,747 | 86.25% |

== Honours ==
- Malacca
  - Companion Class II of the Exalted Order of Malacca (DPSM) – Datuk (2016)
