= Chong Eng =

Malaysian politician

Yang Berbahagia Dato' Seri Chong Eng DGPN
- 章瑛

Member of the Penang State Executive Council
- In office 16 May 2018 – 13 August 2023 (Women and Family Development & Gender Inclusivity & Non-Islamic Religions)
- Governor: Abdul Rahman Abbas (2018–2021); Ahmad Fuzi Abdul Razak (2021–2023)
- Chief Minister: Chow Kon Yeow
- Preceded by: Herself (Women and Family Development); Lim Guan Eng (Non-Islamic Religious Affairs); Portfolio established (Gender Inclusivity)
- Succeeded by: Lim Siew Khim (Non-Islamic Affairs); Portfolios abolished (Women and Family Development & Gender Inclusivity)
- Constituency: Padang Lalang
- In office 9 May 2013 – 14 May 2018 (Youth and Sports & Women, Family and Community Development & Arts)
- Governor: Abdul Rahman Abbas
- Chief Minister: Lim Guan Eng
- Preceded by: Ong Kok Fooi (Youth and Sports & Women, Family and Community Development); Law Heng Kiang (Arts)
- Succeeded by: Herself (Women and Family Development); Ahmad Zakiyuddin Abdul Rahman (Community Relations); Soon Lip Chee (Youth and Sports); Yeoh Soon Hin (Arts)
- Constituency: Padang Lalang

2nd Women Chief of the Pakatan Harapan
- In office 18 March 2021 – 12 September 2021
- President: Wan Azizah Wan Ismail
- Chairman: Anwar Ibrahim
- Preceded by: Zuraida Kamaruddin
- Succeeded by: Aiman Athirah Sabu

Women Advisor of the Democratic Action Party
- Incumbent
- Assumed office 9 September 2023
- Secretary-General: Anthony Loke Siew Fook
- Women Chief: Teo Nie Ching
- Preceded by: Position established

Women Chief of the Democratic Action Party
- In office 2000 – 9 September 2023
- Deputy: Teo Nie Ching
- Secretary-General: Kerk Kim Hock (2000–2004); Lim Guan Eng (2004–2022); Anthony Loke Siew Fook (2022–2023)
- Succeeded by: Teo Nie Ching

Secretary-General of the Democratic Action Party
- Acting; 5 May 2002 – 22 September 2002
- Secretary-General: Kerk Kim Hock
- National Chairman: Lim Kit Siang

Member of the Penang State Legislative Assembly for Padang Lalang
- In office 5 May 2013 – 12 August 2023
- Preceded by: Tan Cheong Heng (PR–DAP)
- Succeeded by: Daniel Gooi Zi Sen (PH–DAP)
- Majority: 14,930 (2013); 18,364 (2018)

Member of the Malaysian Parliament for Bukit Mertajam
- In office 29 November 1999 – 5 May 2013
- Preceded by: Tan Chong Keng (BN–MCA)
- Succeeded by: Steven Sim Chee Keong (PR–DAP)
- Majority: 2,937 (1999); 8,564 (2004); 25,897 (2008)

Member of the Penang State Legislative Assembly for Batu Lancang
- In office 25 April 1995 – 29 November 1999
- Preceded by: Tan Loo Jit (DAP)
- Succeeded by: Law Heng Kiang (BA–DAP)
- Majority: 7,570 (1995)

Faction represented in Penang State Legislative Assembly
- 1995–1999: Democratic Action Party
- 2013–2018: Democratic Action Party
- 2018–2023: Pakatan Harapan

Faction represented in Dewan Rakyat
- 1999–2013: Democratic Action Party

Personal details
- Born: Chong Eng; 6 July 1957 (age 69) Bentong, Pahang, Federation of Malaya (now Malaysia)
- Citizenship: Malaysian
- Party: Democratic Action Party (DAP) (since 1991)
- Other political affiliations: Gagasan Rakyat (GR) (1991–1995); Barisan Alternatif (BA) (1999–2004); Pakatan Rakyat (PR) (2008–2015); Pakatan Harapan (PH) (since 2015)
- Spouse: Gunabalan Krishnasamy
- Children: 2 sons
- Education: Universiti Putra Malaysia; Tunku Abdul Rahman University College
- Occupation: Politician

Chong Eng (Chinese: 章瑛; pinyin: Zhāng Yīng; Pe̍h-ōe-jī: Chiong Eng; born on 6 July 1957) is a Malaysian politician who served as Member of the Penang State Executive Council (EXCO) in the Pakatan Rakyat (PR) and Pakatan Harapan (PH) state administration under Chief Ministers Lim Guan Eng and Chow Kon Yeow and Member of the Penang State Legislative Assembly (MLA) for Padang Lalang from May 2013 to August 2023, Member of Parliament (MP) of for Bukit Mertajam from November 1999 to May 2013 and MLA for Batu Lancang from April 1995 to November 1999. She is a member and was the Deputy Secretary-General of the Democratic Action Party (DAP), a component party of the PH and formerly PR, Barisan Alternatif (BA) and Gagasan Rakyat (GR) coalitions. She has served as the Women Advisor of DAP since September 2023. She also served as Women Chief of PH from March to September 2021, Women Chief of DAP from 2000 to September 2023 and Acting Secretary-General of DAP from May to September 2002. She is also Deputy Head and Member of the Standing Order Committee of the Women Parliamentary Caucus. She also served in the Women Crisis Center and Community AIDS Service Penang.

== Family ==
She is married to Gunabalan Krishnasamy who is an artist. The couple have two sons, Jothi, who is assisting his mother in political endeavors and Omprekash who is now a 3-time Malaysia book of records breaking athlete, and artist for Koi Tribe, an international web magazine.

== Personal life and education ==
She was born in a Chinese new village in Pahang from a family of 10 siblings. She started her primary education in the only Chinese primary school in the village. She was also the first girl from the village to pursue her study in a local university, namely Universiti Pertanian Malaysia (now Universiti Putra Malaysia (UPM)). She eventually obtained her bachelor of Science degree in Human Development Studies from UPM. Now, she writes regularly in local Chinese dailies and have published three books.

== Political career ==
Chong started her political career as a full-time research officer in 1990 with DAP Penang. Chong won the Batu Lanchang state constituency in 1995 Malaysian general election and became the first women to be elected into the Penang State Assembly. She was the sole opposition representative in the state assembly at that time. She subsequently were elected as Bukit Mertajam Member of Parliament in 1999, 2004 and 2008 general elections. She then contested and won the Penang state seat of Padang Lalang in 2013 and 2018 general elections. On 18 March 2021, she was appointed as Women Chief of the Pakatan Harapan (PH) opposition coalition.

== Election results ==
Penang State Legislative Assembly
Year	Constituency	Candidate	Votes	Pct	Opponent(s)	Votes	Pct	Ballots cast	Majority	Turnout
1995	N27 Batu Lancang	Chong Eng (DAP)	7,570	49.72%	Lee Boon Ten (Gerakan)	7,508	49.31%	15,449	62	76.48%
1995	N27 Batu Lancang	Chong Eng (DAP)	7,570	49.72%	Tan Ban Yew (PBS)	148	0.97%	15,449	62	76.48%
1999	N13 Berapit	Chong Eng (DAP)	5,826	40.90%	Lau Chiek Tuan (MCA)	8,420	59.10%	14,549	2,594	77.60%
2004	N16 Perai	Chong Eng (DAP)	4,477	46.94%	Rajapathy Kuppusamy (MIC)	5,060	53.06%	9,748	583	70.57%
2013	N15 Padang Lalang	Chong Eng (DAP)	18,657	83.22%	Tan Teik Cheng (MCA)	3,727	16.62%	22,585	14,930	87.43%
2018	N15 Padang Lalang	Chong Eng (DAP)	20,764	88.70%	Kuan Hin Yeep (MCA)	2,400	10.20%	23,694	18,364	84.70%
2018	N15 Padang Lalang	Chong Eng (DAP)	20,764	88.70%	Lai Yean Nee (PRM)	154	0.70%	23,694	18,364	84.70%
2018	N15 Padang Lalang	Chong Eng (DAP)	20,764	88.70%	Liew Ee Jin (PFP)	101	0.40%	23,694	18,364	84.70%

Parliament of Malaysia
Year	Constituency	Candidate	Votes	Pct	Opponent(s)	Votes	Pct	Ballots cast	Majority	Turnout
1999	P045 Bukit Mertajam	Chong Eng (DAP)	26,874	52.84%	Tan Chong Keng (MCA)	23,937	47.06%	51,967	2,937	78.02%
2004	P045 Bukit Mertajam	Chong Eng (DAP)	26,215	59.18%	Ma Kok Ben (MCA)	17,651	39.85%	45,442	8,564	77.37%
2008	P045 Bukit Mertajam	Chong Eng (DAP)	37,882	75.97%	Ong Tang Chuan (MCA)	11,985	24.03%	50,823	25,897	79.31%

== Honours ==
- Penang
  - Commander of the Order of the Defender of State (DGPN) – Dato' Seri (2023)
