= Jit Sin High School =

School in Bukit Mertajam, Penang, Malaysia

Jit Sin National Type Chinese High School
- Sekolah Menengah Jenis Kebangsaan Cina Jit Sin 日新国民型华文中学
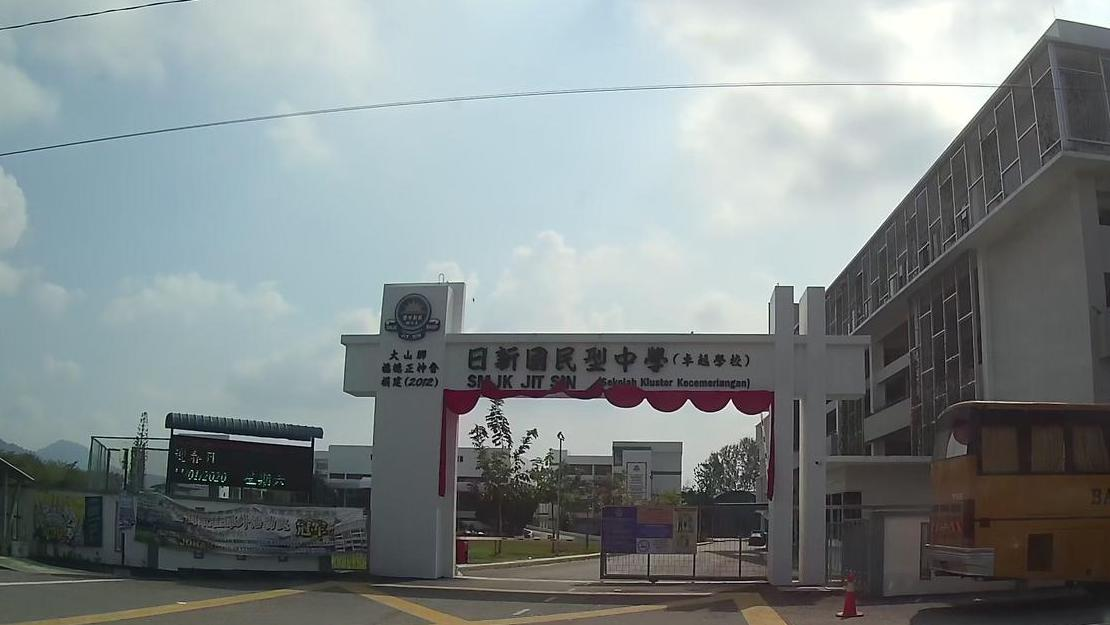
- Courtesy, Love, Diligence and Humility (敬爱勤朴)

Location
- Jalan Binjai, Taman Sri Rambai, 14000 Bukit Mertajam; Penang; Malaysia
- 5.343130°N 100.446405°E

Information
- Type: National-type Chinese secondary school
- Established: 2 March 1918
- Sister school: Jit Sin Independent High School; The Heights School (Australia) Jishukan High School
- School code: PEB0045
- Forms: 1–6
- Enrollment: 2349 (2020)
- National ranking: 1
- Website: SMJK School Portal - SMJK JIT SIN

Jit Sin National Type Chinese High School
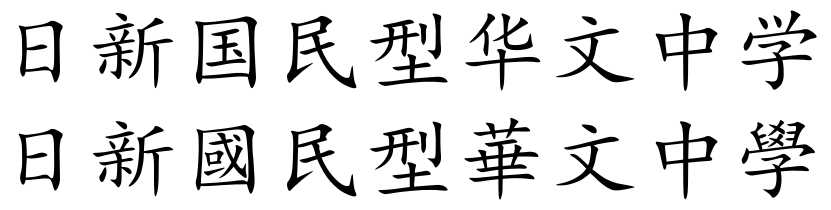
- Jit Sin National Type Chinese High School in Simplified Chinese (top) and Traditional Chinese character (bottom)
- Traditional Chinese: 日新國民型華文中學
- Simplified Chinese: 日新国民型华文中学
Transcriptions
Standard Mandarin
- Hanyu Pinyin: Rì Xīn Guó Mín Xíng Huá Wén Zhōng Xué
Southern Min
- Hokkien POJ: Ji̍t-sin Kok-bîn-hêng Hôa-bûn Tiong-o̍h
- Teochew Peng'im: Ngiêk4 sing1 gog8 min5 hêng5 huê1 bung4 dang1 oh8

Jit Sin High School, officially the Jit Sin National Type Chinese High School (Malay: Sekolah Menengah Jenis Kebangsaan Cina Jit Sin, simplified Chinese: 日新国民型华文中学; traditional Chinese: 日新國民型華文中學; Pe̍h-ōe-jī: Jit-sim Kok-bîn-hêng Hóa-bûn Tiong-ha̍k) is a National-type Chinese secondary school founded in 1918 in Bukit Mertajam, Penang.

The school is known nationwide as a top elite school for its excellent academic results in public examinations such as Pentaksiran Tingkatan Tiga (PT3), Penilaian Menengah Rendah (PMR) which was abolished in 2014, Sijil Pelajaran Malaysia (SPM) and Sijil Tinggi Persekolahan Malaysia (STPM) consistently every year.

== Developments ==
Jit Sin High School (JSHS) used to share the same compound with Jit Sin Independent High School at Aston Road. In 1992, Jit Sin High School moved to a purpose-built campus in Taman Sri Rambai. Students attend classes from Form 1 to Form 6, they used to organise them into morning and afternoon sessions. Now, all forms have changed to morning session since the year 2020. Jit Sin High shares the same school anthem with Jit Sin Independent High School as well as its primary school counterparts, SJK(C) Jit Sin (A) & SJK(C) Jit Sin (B).

In October 2011, Jit Sin High School was awarded the title of Cluster School of Excellence (Sekolah Kluster Kecemerlangan), and is the first vernacular secondary school in Penang to achieve this premier status.

A new building due north to the original building was opened on 22 June 2019 for Form 5 and Form 6 students. The new building consists of 6 floors with 2 main elevators and 2 smaller elevators.
