= Ti Lian Ker =

Malaysian politician

Yang Berbahagia Dato' Sri Ti Lian Ker SSAP DSAP DIMP JMN
- 郑联科

Deputy Minister of Youth and Sports
- In office 30 August 2021 – 24 November 2022
- Monarch: Abdullah
- Prime Minister: Ismail Sabri Yaakob
- Minister: Ahmad Faizal Azumu
- Preceded by: Wan Ahmad Fayhsal Wan Ahmad Kamal
- Succeeded by: Adam Adli
- Constituency: Senator

Deputy Minister of National Unity
- In office 5 May 2020 – 16 August 2021
- Monarch: Abdullah
- Prime Minister: Muhyiddin Yassin
- Minister: Halimah Mohamed Sadique
- Preceded by: Mohamed Farid Md Rafik (Deputy Minister in the Prime Minister's Department (National Unity and Social Wellbeing))
- Succeeded by: Wan Ahmad Fayhsal Wan Ahmad Kamal
- Constituency: Senator

Vice President of the Malaysian Chinese Association
- In office 4 November 2018 – 24 September 2023 Serving with Lim Ban Hong & Tan Teik Cheng & Yew Teong Look
- President: Wee Ka Siong
- Preceded by: Hou Kok Chung
- Succeeded by: Wee Jeck Seng

Senator Appointed by the Yang di-Pertuan Agong
- In office 10 August 2018 – 9 August 2024
- Monarchs: Muhammad V (2018–2019); Abdullah (2019–2024); Ibrahim (31 January–9 August 2024)
- Prime Minister: Mahathir Mohamad (2018–2020); Muhyiddin Yassin (2020–2021); Ismail Sabri Yaakob (2021–2022); Anwar Ibrahim (2022–2024)

Member of the Pahang State Legislative Assembly for Teruntum
- In office 21 March 2004 – 8 March 2008
- Preceded by: Kan Tong Leong (BN–MCA)
- Succeeded by: Chang Hong Seong (BN–MCA)
- Majority: 8,362 (2004)

Member of the Pahang State Legislative Assembly for Indera Mahkota
- In office 25 April 1995 – 21 March 2004
- Preceded by: Constituency created
- Succeeded by: Constituency abolished
- Majority: 3,575 (1995); 6,617 (1999)

Personal details
- Born: 25 October 1962 (age 63) Raub, Pahang, Malaysia
- Citizenship: Malaysian
- Party: Malaysian Chinese Association (MCA)
- Other political affiliations: Barisan Nasional (BN)
- Occupation: Politician

Ti Lian Ker (Pe̍h-ōe-jī: Tīnn Liân-kho; born 25 October 1962) is a Malaysian politician who served as a Senator from August 2018 to August 2024, Deputy Minister of Youth and Sports in the Barisan Nasional (BN) administration under former Prime Minister Ismail Sabri Yaakob and former Minister Ahmad Faizal Azumu from August 2021 to the collapse of the BN administration in November 2022 and as Deputy Minister of National Unity in the Perikatan Nasional (PN) administration under Prime Minister Muhyiddin Yassin and former Minister Halimah Mohamed Sadique from May 2020 to the collapse of the PN administration in August 2021 as well as Member of the Pahang State Legislative Assembly (MLA) for Teruntum from March 2004 to March 2008 and for Indera Mahkota from April 1995 to March 2004. He is a member and the Division Chief of Kuantan of the Malaysian Chinese Association (MCA), a component party of the BN coalition. He had also served as a Vice President of MCA from November 2018 to September 2023.

== Controversy ==
On 22 September 2022, Ti Lian Ker asked Malaysians to be forgiving to the health condition of incarcerated former Prime Minister Najib Razak. PKR Deputy Information Chief Chua Wei Kiat reminded him not to feed ‘perverse idea’ to the rakyat. DAP chairman Lim Guan Eng challenged MCA to prove its allegations that disgraced Najib Razak is suffering from torture behind bars at the Kajang Prison.

Najib was convicted of stealing RM42 million from former 1MDB subsidiary SRC International Sdn Bhd and sent to prison on 23 August to serve a 12-year jail sentence. He was also fined RM210 million and will have to serve another five years if he does not pay the amount.

== Election results ==
Pahang State Legislative Assembly
Year	Constituency	Candidate	Votes	Pct	Opponent(s)	Votes	Pct	Ballots cast	Majority	Turnout
1995	N14 Indera Mahkota	Ti Lian Ker (MCA)	10,937	66.72%	Abdul Aziz Othman (S46)	4,320	26.35%	16,393	6,617	73.35%
1999	N14 Indera Mahkota	Ti Lian Ker (MCA)	10,439	57.67%	Razali Alias (KeADILan)	6,864	37.92%	18,100	3,575	75.70%
2004	N14 Teruntum	Ti Lian Ker (MCA)	12,000	74.31%	Pang Jon Kong (PKR)	3,638	22.53%	16,149	8,362	71.04%

== Honours ==
- Malaysia
  - Companion of the Order of the Defender of the Realm (JMN) (2010)
- Pahang
  - Knight Companion of the Order of the Crown of Pahang (DIMP) – Dato' (2004)
  - Knight Companion of the Order of Sultan Ahmad Shah of Pahang (DSAP) – Dato' (2010)
  - Grand Knight of the Order of Sultan Ahmad Shah of Pahang (SSAP) – Dato' Sri (2014)
