= Law Heng Kiang =

Malaysian politician

Yang Berbahagia Dato' Law Heng Kiang DMPN
- 罗兴强

Member of the Penang State Legislative Assembly for Batu Lancang
- In office 8 March 2008 – 9 May 2018
- Preceded by: Ng Fook On (BN–Gerakan)
- Succeeded by: Ong Ah Teong (PH–DAP)
- Majority: 6,745 (2008); 15,364 (2013)
- In office 1999–2004
- Preceded by: Chong Eng (DAP)
- Succeeded by: Ng Fook On (BN–Gerakan)
- Majority: 281 (1999)

Personal details
- Born: 20 December 1961 (age 64) Perak, Federation of Malaya
- Party: Democratic Action Party (DAP) (–2022); Heritage Party (WARISAN) (since 2022)
- Other political affiliations: Pakatan Harapan (PH) (–2022)
- Occupation: Politician

Law Heng Kiang is a Malaysian politician who served as Member of the Penang State Legislative Assembly for Batu Lancang seat from 1999 to 2004 and 2008 to 2018. He is a member of Heritage Party (WARISAN) and was a member of Democratic Action Party (DAP), a component party of Pakatan Harapan (PH).

He left DAP in 2022 and subsequently joined WARISAN.

== Election results ==
Penang State Legislative Assembly
Year	Constituency	Candidate	Votes	Pct	Opponent(s)	Votes	Pct	Ballots cast	Majority	Turnout
1999	N27 Batu Lancang	Law Heng Kiang (DAP)	7,532	50.95%	Tan Tee Beng (Gerakan)	7,251	49.05%	15,104	281	74.37%
2004	N31 Batu Lancang	Law Heng Kiang (DAP)	7,467	49.54%	Ng Fook On (Gerakan)	7,606	50.46%	15,365	139	73.68%
2008	N31 Batu Lancang	Law Heng Kiang (DAP)	11,945	69.70%	Ng Fook On (Gerakan)	5,200	30.30%	17,319	6,745	78.10%
2013	N31 Batu Lancang	Law Heng Kiang (DAP)	18,760	84.70%	Lee Boon Ten (Gerakan)	3,396	15.30%	22,398	15,364	86.70%

== Honours ==
- Penang
  - Companion of the Order of the Defender of State (DMPN) – Dato' (2018)
