= Heng Lee Lee =

Malaysian politician and former reporter

Yang Berhormat Puan Heng Lee Lee MLA
- 王丽丽

State Women Chief of the Democratic Action Party of Penang
- Incumbent
- Assumed office 18 October 2025
- Deputy: Mangaleswary V Kumarasamy
- Secretary-General: Anthony Loke Siew Fook
- State Chairman: Steven Sim Chee Keong
- Preceded by: Lim Siew Khim

Member of the Penang State Legislative Assembly for Berapit
- Incumbent
- Assumed office 9 May 2018
- Preceded by: Ong Kok Fooi (PR–DAP)
- Majority: 16,981 (2018); 18,053 (2023)

Personal details
- Born: Heng Lee Lee; 27 September 1979 (age 47) Bukit Mertajam, Penang, Malaysia
- Citizenship: Malaysian
- Party: Democratic Action Party (DAP)
- Other political affiliations: Pakatan Harapan (PH)
- Education: Jalan Damai National Secondary School
- Alma mater: Universiti Sains Malaysia (B.Comm.)
- Occupation: Politician; reporter

Heng Lee Lee

Chinese name
- Traditional Chinese: 王麗麗
- Simplified Chinese: 王丽丽
Transcriptions
Standard Mandarin
- Hanyu Pinyin: Wáng Lìlì

Heng Lee Lee (simplified Chinese: 王丽丽; traditional Chinese: 王麗麗; pinyin: Wáng Lìlì; born 27 September 1979) is a Malaysian politician and former reporter who has served as Member of the Penang State Legislative Assembly (MLA) for Berapit since May 2018. She is a member of the Democratic Action Party (DAP), a component party of the Pakatan Harapan (PH) coalition. She has also served as the State Women Chief of DAP of Penang since October 2025. She served as a Special Officer of the Office of the Chief Minister of Penang and was also a reporter from 2003 to 2010.

Heng was a Special Officer for the Penang Chief Minister's Office from 2011 to 2018.

== Education ==
She received her secondary education at the Jalan Damai National Secondary School and tertiary education of the Bachelor of Communications (B.Comm.) at Universiti Sains Malaysia (USM).

== Election results ==
Penang State Legislative Assembly
Year	Constituency	Candidate	Votes	Pct.	Opponent(s)	Votes	Pct.	Ballots cast	Majority	Turnout
2018	N13 Berapit	Heng Lee Lee (DAP)	18,378	92.06%	Goh Swee Gim (MCA)	1,397	7.00%	20,207	16,981	84.98%
2018	N13 Berapit	Heng Lee Lee (DAP)	18,378	92.06%	Lee Poh Kong (PFP)	105	0.53%	20,207	16,981	84.98%
2018	N13 Berapit	Heng Lee Lee (DAP)	18,378	92.06%	Song Chee Meng (PRM)	84	0.42%	20,207	16,981	84.98%
2023	N13 Berapit	Heng Lee Lee (DAP)	19,183	94.44%	Lee Kok Keong (Gerakan)	1,130	5.56%	20,486	18,053	70.46%

== Personal life ==
Heng is married to a Taiwanese in 2019.
