= Lee Khai Loon =

Malaysian politician

Yang Berhormat Tuan Lee Khai Loon MLA
- 李凯伦

Member of the Penang State Legislative Assembly for Machang Bubuk
- Incumbent
- Assumed office 5 May 2013
- Preceded by: Tan Hock Leong (PR–PKR)
- Majority: 11,900 (2013); 16,747 (2018); 15,922 (2023)

Personal details
- Born: Lee Khai Loon; 29 March 1978 (age 48) Bukit Mertajam, Penang, Malaysia
- Citizenship: Malaysian
- Party: People's Justice Party (PKR)
- Other political affiliations: Pakatan Rakyat (PR) (2008–2015); Pakatan Harapan (PH) (since 2015)
- Occupation: Politician

Lee Khai Loon (born 29 March 1978) is a Malaysian politician who has served as Member of the Penang State Legislative Assembly (MLA) for Machang Bubuk since May 2013. He is a member and Branch Chief of Bukit Mertajam of the People's Justice Party (PKR), a component of the Pakatan Harapan (PH) and formerly Pakatan Rakyat (PR) coalitions.

== Election results ==
Penang State Legislative Assembly
Year	Constituency	Candidate	Votes	Pct	Opponent(s)	Votes	Pct	Ballots cast	Majority	Turnout
2013	N14 Machang Bubok	Lee Khai Loon (PKR)	19,080	70.68%	Tan Lok Heah (Gerakan)	7,180	26.60%	27,465	11,900	89.26%
2013	N14 Machang Bubok	Lee Khai Loon (PKR)	19,080	70.68%	Wan Balkis Wan Abdullah (IND)	252	0.93%	27,465	11,900	89.26%
2013	N14 Machang Bubok	Lee Khai Loon (PKR)	19,080	70.68%	Tan Hock Leong (IND)	172	0.64%	27,465	11,900	89.26%
2013	N14 Machang Bubok	Lee Khai Loon (PKR)	19,080	70.68%	Vikneswaran Muniandy (KITA)	159	0.59%	27,465	11,900	89.26%
2013	N14 Machang Bubok	Lee Khai Loon (PKR)	19,080	70.68%	Ooi Suan Hoe (IND)	152	0.56%	27,465	11,900	89.26%
2018	N14 Machang Bubuk	Lee Khai Loon (PKR)	21,819	68.98%	Md Jamil Abd Rahman (PAS)	5,072	16.04%	32,138	16,747	86.25%
2018	N14 Machang Bubuk	Lee Khai Loon (PKR)	21,819	68.98%	Tan Teik Cheng (MCA)	4,658	14.73%	32,138	16,747	86.25%
2018	N14 Machang Bubuk	Lee Khai Loon (PKR)	21,819	68.98%	Teng Ah Ba (PRM)	53	0.17%	32,138	16,747	86.25%
2018	N14 Machang Bubuk	Lee Khai Loon (PKR)	21,819	68.98%	Lim Jhun Hou (MUP)	28	0.09%	32,138	16,747	86.25%
2023	N14 Machang Bubuk	Lee Khai Loon (PKR)	28,777	69.12%	Tan Hum Wei (Gerakan)	12,855	30.88%	41,897	15,922	74.10%
