= Pulau Tawar (state constituency) =

Political subdivision in Malaysia

Pulau Tawar (N11)
Pahang constituency

State constituency
- Legislature: Pahang State Legislative Assembly
MLA
Yohanis Ahmad
PN
- Constituency created: 1984
- First contested: 1986
- Last contested: 2022

Demographics
- Electors (2022): 31,189

Pulau Tawar is a state constituency in Pahang, Malaysia, that is represented in the Pahang State Legislative Assembly.

== Demographics ==
Ethnic breakdown of Pulau Tawar's electorate as of 2022
1. Malay (98.3%)
2. Other ethnicities (0.96%)
3. Indian (0.62%)
4. Chinese (0.09%)

== History ==
=== Polling districts ===
According to the federal gazette issued on 31 October 2022, the Pulau Tawar constituency is divided into 17 polling districts.

State constituency	Polling Districts	Code	Location
Pulau Tawar（N11）	FELDA Kota Gelanggi 2	081/11/01	SK LKTP Kota Gelanggi 2
Pulau Tawar（N11）	FELDA Lepar Utara Tiga	081/11/02	SK LKTP Lepar Utara 8; SK LKTP Lepar Utara 1
Pulau Tawar（N11）	FELDA Sungai Tekam Utara	081/11/03	SK LKTP Tekam Utara
Pulau Tawar（N11）	Kampung Perak	081/11/04	Balai Raya Kampung Perak
Pulau Tawar（N11）	Pusat Penyelidikan Tun Razak	081/11/05	SK Pusat Penyelidikan Pertanian Tun Razak
Pulau Tawar（N11）	FELDA Sungai Tekam	081/11/06	SK KLTP Sungai Tekam
Pulau Tawar（N11）	FELDA Jengka 10	081/11/07	SMK LKTP Jengka 10
Pulau Tawar（N11）	FELDA Jengka 8	081/11/08	SK LKTP Jengka 8
Pulau Tawar（N11）	FELDA Jengka 9	081/11/09	SK LKTP Jengka 9
Pulau Tawar（N11）	FELDA Jengka 12	081/11/10	SK LKTP Jengka 12
Pulau Tawar（N11）	FELDA Jengka 13	081/11/11	SK LKTP Jengka 13
Pulau Tawar（N11）	FELDA Jengka 24	081/11/12	SK LKTP Jengka 24
Pulau Tawar（N11）	Durian Hijau	081/11/13	SK Durian Hijau
Pulau Tawar（N11）	Bukit Nikmat	081/11/14	SK Bukit Nikmat
Pulau Tawar（N11）	Pulau Tawar	081/11/15	SMA Pulau Tawar
Pulau Tawar（N11）	FELDA Kota Gelanggi 1	081/11/16	SK LKTP Kota Gelanggi 1
Pulau Tawar（N11）	FELDA Kota Gelanggi 3	081/11/17	SK LKTP Kota Gelanggi 3

=== Representation history ===
Members of the Legislative Assembly for Pulau Tawar
Assembly	No	Years	Name	Party
Constituency created from Bandar Jerantut, Kerdau and Tahan
7th	N11	1986-1990	Ho Chock Keong	BN (MCA)
8th	N11	1990-1995	Abu Bakar Hassan	S46
9th	N11	1995-1999	Azizan Yaakob	BN (UMNO)
10th	N11	1999-2004	Ahmad Shukri Ismail	BN (UMNO)
11th	N11	2004-2008	Ahmad Shukri Ismail	BN (UMNO)
12th	N11	2008-2013	Ahmad Shukri Ismail	BN (UMNO)
13th	N11	2013-2018	Ahmad Shukri Ismail	BN (UMNO)
14th	N11	2018-2022	Nazri Ngah	BN (UMNO)
15th	N11	2022–present	Yohanis Ahmad	PN (PAS)

== Election results ==
Pahang state election, 2022
Party	Candidate	Votes	%	∆%
PN	Yohanis Ahmad	12,986	53.73	▲53.73
BN	Nazri Ngah	9,499	39.30	▼6.91
PH	Norani Muhd @ Mohd Arshad	1,091	4.51	▲4.51
Independent	Ridzuan Mansor	544	2.25	▲2.25
GTA	Mohd Rosidi Hassan	50	0.21	▲0.21
Total valid votes		24,170	100.00	
Total rejected ballots		298		
Unreturned ballots		63		
Turnout		24,531	78.65	▼1.70
Registered electors		31,189		
Majority		3,487	14.43	▲11.22
PN gain from BN		Swing		?

Pahang state election, 2018
Party	Candidate	Votes	%	∆%
BN	Nazri Ngah	8,446	46.21	▼13.19
PAS	Ahmad Naawi Samah	7,859	43.00	▲2.40
PKR	Jamaluddin Abd Rahim	1,973	10.79	▲10.79
Total valid votes		18,278	78.6	
Total rejected ballots		295		
Unreturned ballots		106		
Turnout		18,679	80.35	▼5.77
Registered electors		23,248		
Majority		587	3.21	▼15.59
BN hold		Swing		

Pahang state election, 2013
Party	Candidate	Votes	%	∆%
BN	Ahmad Shukri Ismail	11,048	59.40	▼2.25
PAS	Yohanis Ahmad	7,552	40.60	▲2.25
Total valid votes		18,600	100.00	
Total rejected ballots		295		
Unreturned ballots		58		
Turnout		18,953	86.53	▲6.88
Registered electors		21,903		
Majority		3,496	18.80	▼4.49
BN hold		Swing		

Pahang state election, 2008
Party	Candidate	Votes	%	∆%
BN	Ahmad Shukri Ismail	8,720	61.64	▼1.55
PAS	Ishak A. Ghani	5,426	38.36	▲1.55
Total valid votes		14,146	100.00	
Total rejected ballots		212		
Unreturned ballots		38		
Turnout		14,396	79.65	▼0.83
Registered electors		18,074		
Majority		3,294	23.29	▼3.10
BN hold		Swing		

Pahang state election, 2004
Party	Candidate	Votes	%	∆%
BN	Ahmad Shukri Ismail	8,434	63.19	▲9.99
PAS	Mohamed Wahid	4,912	36.81	▼9.99
Total valid votes		13,346	100.00	
Total rejected ballots		169		
Unreturned ballots		27		
Turnout		13,542	80.48	▲0.18
Registered electors		16,826		
Majority		3,522	26.39	▲19.99
BN hold		Swing		

Pahang state election, 1999
Party	Candidate	Votes	%	∆%
BN	Ahmad Shukri Ismail	6,338	53.20	▼17.20
PAS	Mohamed Wahid	5,575	46.80	▲46.80
Total valid votes		11,913	100.00	
Total rejected ballots		256		
Unreturned ballots		12		
Turnout		12,181	80.31	▲1.34
Registered electors		15,168		
Majority		763	6.40	▼34.39
BN hold		Swing		

Pahang state election, 1995
Party	Candidate	Votes	%	∆%
BN	Azizan Yaakob	7,798	70.40	▲70.40
S46	Hashim Awang Sulong	3,279	29.60	▼25.26
Total valid votes		11,077	100.00	
Total rejected ballots		286		
Unreturned ballots		19		
Turnout		11,382	78.96	▲6.45
Registered electors		14,414		
Majority		4,519	40.80	▲31.07
BN gain from S46		Swing		-

Pahang state election, 1990
Party	Candidate	Votes	%	∆%
S46	Abu Bakar Hassan	5,058	54.86	▲54.86
BN	Ho Chock Keong	4,161	45.14	▼16.04
Total valid votes		9,219	100.00	
Total rejected ballots		332		
Unreturned ballots		16		
Turnout		9,567	72.52	▲3.91
Registered electors		13,193		
Majority		897	9.73	▼24.67
S46 gain from BN		Swing		-

Pahang state election, 1986
Party	Candidate	Votes	%
BN	Ho Chock Keong	4,656	61.17
PAS	Syed Ibrahim Syed Abd.Rahman	2,038	26.78
DAP	Leong Seng Cho	917	12.05
Total valid votes		7,611	100.00
Total rejected ballots		319	
Unreturned ballots		0	
Turnout		7,930	68.61
Registered electors		11,558	
Majority		2,618	34.40
This was a new constituency created.
