= Teruntum =

Political subdivision in Malaysia

Teruntum (N14)
Pahang constituency

State constituency
- Legislature: Pahang State Legislative Assembly
MLA
Sim Chon Siang
PH
- Constituency created: 1984
- First contested: 1986
- Last contested: 2022

Demographics
- Electors (2022): 30,854

Teruntum is a state constituency in Pahang, Malaysia, that is represented in the Pahang State Legislative Assembly.

== Demographics ==
Ethnic breakdown of Teruntum's electorate as of 2022
1. Chinese (55.3%)
2. Malay (37.5%)
3. Indian (5.93%)
4. Other ethnicities (1.19%)

== History ==
=== Polling districts ===
According to the federal gazette issued on 31 October 2022, the Teruntum constituency is divided into 10 polling districts.

State constituency	Polling district	Code	Location
Teruntum（N14）	Seri Kuantan	083/14/01	SK Galing
Teruntum（N14）	Perkampungan Teratai	083/14/02	SMK Alor Akar
Teruntum（N14）	Medan Tok Sira	083/14/03	SMK Tok Sera
Teruntum（N14）	Kubang Buaya	083/14/04	MRSM Kuantan
Teruntum（N14）	Kampung Selamat	083/14/05	SMA Al-Ihsan Kuantan
Teruntum（N14）	Bandar Kuantan	083/14/06	SK (P) Methodist Kuantan
Teruntum（N14）	Seri Teruntum	083/14/07	Pejabat Pendidikan Daerah Kuantan
Teruntum（N14）	Kampung Jawa	083/14/08	SK Sultan Abdullah
Teruntum（N14）	Seri Belian	083/14/09	SK Teruntum
Teruntum（N14）	Lapang Besar	083/14/10	SMK (P) Methodist Kuantan

=== Representation history ===
Members of the Legislative Assembly for Teruntum
Assembly	No	Years	Name	Party
Constituency created from Bandar Kuantan, Beserah, Kuala Pahang and Paya Besar
7th	N14	1986-1989	Lim Ah Lek (林亚礼)	BN (MCA)
7th	N14	1990	Kan Tong Leong (简东亮)	BN (MCA)
8th	N14	1990-1995	Kan Tong Leong (简东亮)	BN (MCA)
9th	N13	1995-1999	Kan Tong Leong (简东亮)	BN (MCA)
10th	N13	1999-2004	Kan Tong Leong (简东亮)	BN (MCA)
11th	N14	2004-2008	Ti Lian Ker (郑联科)	BN (MCA)
12th	N14	2008-2013	Chang Hong Seong (陈汉祥)	BN (MCA)
13th	N14	2013-2018	Sim Chon Siang (沈春祥)	PR (PKR)
14th	N14	2018-2022	Sim Chon Siang (沈春祥)	PH (PKR)
15th	N14	2022–present	Sim Chon Siang (沈春祥)	PH (PKR)

== Election results ==
Pahang state election, 2022: Teruntum
Party	Candidate	Votes	%	∆%
PH	Sim Chon Siang	12,983	58.63	▲58.63
BN	Tee Choon Ser	4,304	19.44	▼3.33
PN	Yap Kim Heng	3,676	16.60	▲16.60
PEJUANG	Khairul Afifie Abdullah	1,180	5.33	▲5.33
Total valid votes		22,143	100.00	
Total rejected ballots		183		
Unreturned ballots		51		
Turnout		22,377	72.53	▼9.13
Registered electors		30,854		
Majority		8,659	39.19	▲0.11
PH hold		Swing		

Pahang state election, 2018: Teruntum
Party	Candidate	Votes	%	∆%
PKR	Sim Chon Siang	12,227	61.85	▲0.94
BN	Tee Choon Ser	4,502	22.77	▼16.32
PAS	Azizah Mohd Ali	3,039	15.37	▲15.37
Total valid votes		19,768	100.00	
Total rejected ballots		163		
Unreturned ballots		276		
Turnout		20,207	81.66	▼0.41
Registered electors		24,746		
Majority		7,725	39.08	▲17.26
PKR hold		Swing		

Pahang state election, 2013: Teruntum
Party	Candidate	Votes	%	∆%
PKR	Sim Chon Siang	12,385	60.91	▲11.84
BN	Chang Hong Seong	7,948	39.09	▼11.64
Total valid votes		20,333	100.00	
Total rejected ballots		317		
Unreturned ballots		0		
Turnout		20,650	82.07	▲10.59
Registered electors		25,160		
Majority		4,437	21.82	▲19.96
PKR gain from BN		Swing		?

Pahang state election, 2008: Teruntum
Party	Candidate	Votes	%	∆%
BN	Chang Hong Seong	8,015	50.93	▼25.81
PKR	Siew Fook Chan	7,722	49.07	▲25.81
Total valid votes		15,737	100.00	
Total rejected ballots		381		
Unreturned ballots		138		
Turnout		16,256	71.48	▲0.44
Registered electors		22,742		
Majority		293	1.86	▼51.62
BN hold		Swing		

Pahang state election, 2004: Teruntum
Party	Candidate	Votes	%	∆%
BN	Ti Lian Ker	12,000	76.74	▲15.62
PKR	Pang Jon Kong	3,638	23.26	▲23.26
Total valid votes		15,638	100.00	
Total rejected ballots		322		
Unreturned ballots		189		
Turnout		16,149	71.04	▼0.13
Registered electors		22,733		
Majority		8,362	53.47	▲31.24
BN hold		Swing		

Pahang state election, 1999: Teruntum
Party	Candidate	Votes	%	∆%
BN	Kan Tong Leong	10,115	61.11	▲0.64
DAP	Wong Kim Yun	6,436	38.89	▲16.29
Total valid votes		16,551	100.00	
Total rejected ballots		525		
Unreturned ballots		462		
Turnout		17,538	71.17	▲2.88
Registered electors		24,642		
Majority		3,679	22.23	▼15.65
BN hold		Swing		

Pahang state election, 1995: Teruntum
Party	Candidate	Votes	%	∆%
BN	Kan Tong Leong	9,241	60.47	▲8.91
DAP	Pang Jon Kong	3,453	22.60	▼16.19
PAS	Mohd Yusof Ibrahim	2,588	16.93	▲16.93
Total valid votes		15,282	100.00	
Total rejected ballots		376		
Unreturned ballots		130		
Turnout		15,788	68.29	▼0.92
Registered electors		23,118		
Majority		5,788	37.87	▲25.10
BN hold		Swing		

Pahang state election, 1990: Teruntum
Party	Candidate	Votes	%	∆%
BN	Kan Tong Leong	9,368	51.56	▼14.20
DAP	Pang Jon Kong	7,047	38.79	▲38.79
Independent	Ismail Mohamad	1,753	9.65	▼5.74
Total valid votes		18,168	100.00	
Total rejected ballots		585		
Unreturned ballots		106		
Turnout		18,859	69.21	▲17.72
Registered electors		27,249		
Majority		2,321	12.78	▼34.14
BN hold		Swing		

Pahang state by-election, 12 August 1989: Teruntum Upon the resignation of the incumbent, Lim Ah Lek
Party	Candidate	Votes	%	∆%
BN	Kan Tong Leong	8,014	65.76	▲1.97
Independent	Yong Siew Fai	2,297	18.85	▲18.85
Independent	Ismail Mohamad	1,875	15.39	▲15.39
Total valid votes		12,186	100.00	
Total rejected ballots		257		
Unreturned ballots		0		
Turnout		12,443	51.49	▼13.51
Registered electors		24,166		
Majority		5,717	46.91	▲7.44
BN hold		Swing		

Pahang state election, 1986: Teruntum
Party	Candidate	Votes	%
BN	Lim Ah Lek	9,698	63.80
DAP	Syed Ali Mohsin	3,697	24.32
PAS	Othman Bakar	1,806	11.88
Total valid votes		15,201	100.00
Total rejected ballots		424	
Unreturned ballots		0	
Turnout		15,625	65.00
Registered electors		24,037	
Majority		6,001	39.48
This was a new constituency created.
