= Padang Lalang =

Penang constituency, Malaysia

Padang Lalang (N15)
Penang constituency

State constituency
- Legislature: Penang State Legislative Assembly
MLA
Daniel Gooi Zi Sen
PH
- Constituency created: 2004
- First contested: 2004
- Last contested: 2023

Demographics
- Population (2020): 39,655
- Electors (2023): 36,001
- Area (km²): 10

Padang Lalang is a state constituency in Penang, Malaysia, that has been represented in the Penang State Legislative Assembly.

The state constituency was first contested in 1986 and is mandated to return a single assemblyman to the Penang State Legislative Assembly under the first-past-the-post voting system. It has been represented by Member of the State Executive Council (EXCO) Daniel Gooi Zi Sen since 2023.

== Definition ==
=== Polling districts ===
According to the federal gazette issued on 30 March 2018, the Padang Lalang constituency is divided into 7 polling districts.

State constituency	Polling District	Code	Location
Padang Lalang (N15)	Kampong Cross Street 1	045/15/01	SK Sungai Rambai
Padang Lalang (N15)	Station Road	045/15/02	SMK Convent (M) Bukit Mertajam
Padang Lalang (N15)	High School	045/15/03	SMK Tinggi Bukit Mertajam
Padang Lalang (N15)	Bukit Kechil	045/15/04	SJK (C) Keow Kuang
Padang Lalang (N15)	Desa Damai	045/15/05	SMJK Jit Sin
Padang Lalang (N15)	Taman Keenways	045/15/06	SK Alma
Padang Lalang (N15)	Taman Binjai	045/15/07	SMJK Jit Sin

== Demographics ==
Ethnic breakdown of Padang Lalang's electorate as of 2023
1. Chinese (78.4%)
2. Malay (12.9%)
3. Indian (8.17%)
4. Other ethnicities (0.47%)

Total electors by polling district in 2016
Polling district	Electors
Kampong Cross Street 1	2,958
Station Road	2,143
High School	3,870
Bukit Kechil	3,506
Desa Damai	5,517
Taman Keenways	5,092
Taman Binjai	3,075
Total	26,161
Source: Malaysian Election Commission

== History ==
Penang State Legislative Assemblyman for Padang Lalang
Assembly	No	Years	Member	Party
Constituency created from Bukit Tengah, Berapit and Machang Bubok
11th	N15	2004 – 2008	Tan Teik Cheng (陈德钦)	BN (MCA)
12th	N15	2008 – 2013	Tan Cheong Heng (陈宗兴)	PR (DAP)
13th	N15	2013 – 2018	Chong Eng (章瑛)	PR (DAP)
14th	N15	2018 – 2023	Chong Eng (章瑛)	PH (DAP)
15th	N15	2023–present	Daniel Gooi Zi Sen (魏子森)	PH (DAP)

== Election results ==
The electoral results for the Padang Lalang state constituency from 2004 to 2023 are as follows.

Penang state election, 2023: Padang Lalang
Party	Candidate	Votes	%	∆%
PH	Daniel Gooi Zi Sen	22,315	87.90	▼0.80
PN	Suresh Devaraj Naidu	2,867	11.30	▲11.30
Penang Front Party	Patrick Ooi Kar Giap	218	0.90	▲0.50
Total valid votes		25,400	100.00	
Total rejected ballots		122		
Unreturned ballots		31		
Turnout		25,553	70.98	▼13.72
Registered electors		36,001		
Majority		19,448	76.60	▼1.90
PH hold		Swing		

Penang state election, 2018: Padang Lalang
Party	Candidate	Votes	%	∆%
PH	Chong Eng	20,764	88.70	▲88.70
BN	Kuan Hin Yeep	2,400	10.20	▼1.40
Parti Rakyat Malaysia	Lai Yean Nee	154	0.70	▲0.70
Penang Front Party	Liew Ee Jean	101	0.40	▲0.40
Total valid votes		23,419	100.00	
Total rejected ballots		224		
Unreturned ballots		51		
Turnout		23,694	84.70	▼2.60
Registered electors		27,959		
Majority		18,364	78.50	▲1.70
PH hold		Swing		
Source(s) "His Majesty's Government Gazette - Notice of Contested Election, State Legislative Assembly for the State of Penang [P.U. (B) 252/2018]" (PDF). Attorney General's Chambers of Malaysia. 3 May 2018. "Federal Government Gazette - Results of Contested Election and Statements of the Poll after the Official Addition of Votes, State Constituencies for the State of Penang [P.U. (B) 326/2018]" (PDF). Attorney General's Chambers of Malaysia. 28 May 2018. Archived from the original (PDF) on 29 August 2019.

Penang state election, 2013: Padang Lalang
Party	Candidate	Votes	%	∆%
DAP	Chong Eng	18,657	88.40	▲25.80
BN	Tan Teik Cheng	3,727	11.60	▼25.80
Total valid votes		22,384	100.00	
Total rejected ballots		166		
Unreturned ballots		0		
Turnout		22,550	87.30	▲9.10
Registered electors		25,831		
Majority		14,930	76.80	▲51.60
DAP hold		Swing		
Source(s) "Federal Government Gazette - Notice of Contested Election, State Legislative Assembly for the State of Penang [P.U. (B) 189/2013]" (PDF). Attorney General's Chambers of Malaysia. 26 April 2013. "Federal Government Gazette - Results of Contested Election and Statements of the Poll after the Official Addition of Votes, State Constituencies for the State of Penang [P.U. (B) 230/2013]" (PDF). Attorney General's Chambers of Malaysia. 22 May 2013. Archived from the original (PDF) on 22 March 2019.

Penang state election, 2008: Padang Lalang
Party	Candidate	Votes	%	∆%
DAP	Tan Cheong Heng	10,520	62.60	▲14.40
BN	Tan Teik Cheng	6,279	37.40	▼14.40
Total valid votes		16,799	100.00	
Total rejected ballots		206		
Unreturned ballots		4		
Turnout		17,009	78.20	▲2.60
Registered electors		21,761		
Majority		4,241	25.20	▲21.60
DAP gain from BN		Swing		?
Source(s): 1. "Keputusan Pilihan Raya Umum Parlimen dan Dewan Undangan Negeri Bagi Tahun 2008". Suruhanjaya Pilihan Raya Malaysia.

Penang state election, 2004: Padang Lalang
Party	Candidate	Votes	%
BN	Tan Teik Cheng	7,567	51.80
DAP	Tan Kim Hooi	7,032	48.20
Total valid votes		14,599	100.00
Total rejected ballots		243	
Unreturned ballots		8	
Turnout		14,850	75.60
Registered electors		19,653	
Majority		535	3.60
This was a new constituency created.
Source(s): 1. "Keputusan Pilihan Raya Umum Parlimen dan Dewan Undangan Negeri Bagi Tahun 2004". Suruhanjaya Pilihan Raya Malaysia.

== See also ==
- Constituencies of Penang
