= Batu Lancang =

State constituency in Penang, Malaysia

Batu Lancang (N31)
Penang constituency
- Batu Lanchang (olive) on Penang

State constituency
- Legislature: Penang State Legislative Assembly
MLA
Ong Ah Teong
PH
- Constituency created: 1986
- First contested: 1986
- Last contested: 2023

Demographics
- Electors (2023): 33,106
- Area (km²): 3

Batu Lancang is a state constituency in Penang, Malaysia, that has been represented in the Penang State Legislative Assembly since 2004. It covers two of George Town's suburbs - Batu Lanchang and parts of Jelutong.

The state constituency was first contested in 1986 and is mandated to return a single Assemblyman to the Penang State Legislative Assembly under the first-past-the-post voting system. Since 2018, the State Assemblyman for Batu Lancang is Ong Ah Teong from the Democratic Action Party (DAP), which is part of the state's ruling coalition, Pakatan Harapan (PH).

== Definition ==
=== Polling districts ===
According to the federal gazette issued on 18 July 2023, the Batu Lanchang constituency is divided into 10 polling districts.

State constituency	Polling districts	Code	Location
Batu Lanchang (N31)	Lilitan Hargreaves	050/31/01	SK Jalan Hamilton
Batu Lanchang (N31)	Chemor Lane	050/31/02	SMJK Heng Ee
Batu Lanchang (N31)	Lorong Parit Buntar	050/31/03	SJK (C) Kheng Tean
Batu Lanchang (N31)	Jelutong Road	050/31/04	SJK (C) Beng Teik (Cawangan)
Batu Lanchang (N31)	Panchor Road	050/31/05	SJK (C) Jelutong
Batu Lanchang (N31)	Batu Lanchang	050/31/06	SJK (C) Jelutong
Batu Lanchang (N31)	Solok Batu Lanchang	050/31/07	SMK Jelutong
Batu Lanchang (N31)	Jalan Penaga	050/31/08	SK Jelutong Barat
Batu Lanchang (N31)	Tingkat Jelutong	050/31/09	SMK Jelutong
Batu Lanchang (N31)	Desa Green	050/31/10	SMK Convent Green Lane

This state seat encompasses all of the Batu Lanchang suburb and a small western portion of Jelutong up to Jelutong Road to the east.

To the west, the Batu Lancang seat is separated from the neighbouring Seri Delima constituency by Green Lane, with the affluent neighbourhood of Green Lane west of the road falling under Seri Delima. The Batu Lancang constituency also stretches north up to Free School Road and Jalan Perak.

== Demographics ==
Ethnic breakdown of Batu Lancang's electorate as of 2023
1. Chinese (84.3%)
2. Indian (8.29%)
3. Malay (6.62%)
4. Other ethnicities (0.76%)

Total electors by polling district in 2016
Polling district	Electors
Batu Lanchang	2,576
Chemor Lane	3,728
Desa Green	2,882
Jalan Penaga	2,201
Jelutong Road	2,381
Lilitan Hargreaves	1,066
Lorong Parit Buntar	3,796
Panchor Road	2,302
Solok Batu Lanchang	2,737
Tingkat Jelutong	2,589
Total	26,258
Source: Malaysian Election Commission

== History ==
During the 1995 State Election, Chong Eng from the DAP was elected as the State Assemblyman for Batu Lancang, becoming the first woman to be elected into the Penang State Legislative Assembly. Between 1995 and 1999, she was also the sole opposition assemblyman in the State Legislative Assembly, which was dominated at the time by the Barisan Nasional (BN) federal ruling coalition.

Members of the Legislative Assembly for Batu Lanchang
Assembly	No	Years	Member	Party
Constituency created from Bukit Gelugor and Sungei Pinang
7th	N27	1986 – 1990	Tan Loo Jit (陈尔奕)	DAP
8th	N27	1990 – 1995	Tan Loo Jit (陈尔奕)	GR (DAP)
9th	N27	1995 – 1999	Chong Eng (章瑛)	GR (DAP)
10th	N27	1999 – 2004	Law Heng Kiang (罗兴强)	BA (DAP)
11th	N31	2004 – 2008	Ng Fook On (吴洑安)	BN (Gerakan)
12th	N31	2008 – 2013	Law Heng Kiang (罗兴强)	PR (DAP)
13th	N31	2013 – 2015	Law Heng Kiang (罗兴强)	PR (DAP)
13th	N31	2015 – 2018	Law Heng Kiang (罗兴强)	PH (DAP)
14th	N31	2018 – 2023	Ong Ah Teong (王耶宗)	PH (DAP)
15th	N31	2023–present	Ong Ah Teong (王耶宗)	PH (DAP)

== Election results ==
The electoral results for the Batu Lancang state constituency in 2008, 2013 and 2018 are as follows.

Penang state election, 2023: Batu Lancang
Party	Candidate	Votes	%	∆%
PH	Ong Ah Teong	21,796	92.10	▲3.10
PN	Mohd Aswaad Jaafar	1,865	7.90	▲7.90
Total valid votes		23,661	100.00	
Total rejected ballots		148		
Unreturned ballots		39		
Turnout		23,848	72.04	▼13.16
Registered electors		33,106		
Majority		19,931	84.20	▲5.60
PH hold		Swing		

Penang state election, 2018: Batu Lancang
Party	Candidate	Votes	%	∆%
PKR	Ong Ah Teong	20,615	89.01	▲4.34
BN	Koo Pei Chee	2,407	10.39	▼4.94
BERSAMA	Kee Lean Ee	139	0.60	▲0.60
Total valid votes		23,161	100.00	
Total rejected ballots		161		
Unreturned ballots		48		
Turnout		23,370	85.16	▼1.50
Registered electors		27,444		
Majority		18,208	78.61	▲9.27
PKR hold		Swing		
Source(s) "His Majesty's Government Gazette - Notice of Contested Election, State Legislative Assembly for the State of Penang [P.U. (B) 252/2018]" (PDF). Attorney General's Chambers of Malaysia. 3 May 2018. "Federal Government Gazette - Results of Contested Election and Statements of the Poll after the Official Addition of Votes, State Constituencies for the State of Penang [P.U. (B) 326/2018]" (PDF). Attorney General's Chambers of Malaysia. 28 May 2018. Archived from the original (PDF) on 29 August 2019.

Penang state election, 2013: Batu Lancang
Party	Candidate	Votes	%	∆%
DAP	Law Heng Kiang	18,760	84.67	▲15.00
BN	Lee Boon Ten	3,396	15.33	▼15.00
Total valid votes		22,156	100.00	
Total rejected ballots		157		
Unreturned ballots		85		
Turnout		22,398	86.66	▲8.73
Registered electors		25,846		
Majority		15,364	69.34	▲30.00
DAP hold		Swing		
Source(s) "Federal Government Gazette - Notice of Contested Election, State Legislative Assembly for the State of Penang [P.U. (B) 189/2013]" (PDF). Attorney General's Chambers of Malaysia. 26 April 2013. "Federal Government Gazette - Results of Contested Election and Statements of the Poll after the Official Addition of Votes, State Constituencies for the State of Penang [P.U. (B) 230/2013]" (PDF). Attorney General's Chambers of Malaysia. 22 May 2013. Archived from the original (PDF) on 22 March 2019.

Penang state election, 2008: Batu Lancang
Party	Candidate	Votes	%	∆%
DAP	Law Heng Kiang	11,945	69.67	▲20.13
BN	Ng Fook On	5,200	30.33	▼20.13
Total valid votes		17,145	100.00	
Total rejected ballots		171		
Unreturned ballots		3		
Turnout		17,319	77.93	▲4.36
Registered electors		22,225		
Majority		6,745	39.34	▲38.42
DAP gain from BN		Swing		?

Penang state election, 2004: Batu Lancang
Party	Candidate	Votes	%	∆%
BN	Ng Fook On	7,606	50.46	▲1.41
DAP	Law Heng Kiang	7,467	49.54	▼1.41
Total valid votes		15,073	100.00	
Total rejected ballots		289		
Unreturned ballots		3		
Turnout		15,365	73.57	▼0.81
Registered electors		20,885		
Majority		139	0.92	▼0.98
BN gain from DAP		Swing		-

Penang state election, 1999: Batu Lancang
Party	Candidate	Votes	%	∆%
DAP	Law Heng Kiang	7,532	50.95	▲1.23
BN	Tan Tee Beng	7,251	49.05	▼0.26
Total valid votes		14,783	100.00	
Total rejected ballots		315		
Unreturned ballots		6		
Turnout		15,104	74.37	▼2.11
Registered electors		20,308		
Majority		281	1.90	▲1.49
DAP hold		Swing		

Penang state election, 1995: Batu Lancang
Party	Candidate	Votes	%	∆%
DAP	Chong Eng	7,570	49.72	▼13.37
BN	Lee Boon Ten	7,508	49.31	▲12.40
PBS	Tan Ban Yew	148	0.97	▲0.97
Total valid votes		15,226	100.00	
Total rejected ballots		223		
Unreturned ballots		0		
Turnout		15,449	76.48	▼1.33
Registered electors		20,200		
Majority		62	0.41	▼25.77
DAP hold		Swing		

Penang state election, 1990: Batu Lancang
Party	Candidate	Votes	%	∆%
DAP	Tan Loo Jit @ Tan Yik Khoon	9,812	63.09	▼2.56
BN	Chua Thien Lye	5,741	36.91	▲2.56
Total valid votes		15,553	100.00	
Total rejected ballots		295		
Unreturned ballots		25		
Turnout		15,873	77.81	▲2.12
Registered electors		20,399		
Majority		4,071	26.18	▼5.12
DAP hold		Swing		

Penang state election, 1986: Batu Lancang
Party	Candidate	Votes	%
DAP	Tan Loo Jit @ Tan Yik Khoon	9,437	65.65
BN	Tan Gim Hwa	4,938	34.35
Total valid votes		14,375	100.00
Total rejected ballots		291	
Unreturned ballots		0	
Turnout		14,666	75.69
Registered electors		19,376	
Majority		4,499	31.30
This was a new constituency created.

== See also ==
- Constituencies of Penang
