= Berapit =

State constituency in Penang, Malaysia

Berapit (N13)
Penang constituency

State constituency
- Legislature: Penang State Legislative Assembly
MLA
Heng Lee Lee
PH
- Constituency created: 1986
- First contested: 1986
- Last contested: 2023

Demographics
- Electors (2023): 29,076
- Area (km²): 6

Berapit is a state constituency in Penang, Malaysia, that has been represented in the Penang State Legislative Assembly.

The state constituency was first contested in 1986 and is mandated to return a single Assemblyman to the Penang State Legislative Assembly under the first-past-the-post voting system. Since 2018, the State Assemblywoman for Berapit is Heng Lee Lee from the Democratic Action Party (DAP), which is part of the state's ruling coalition, Pakatan Harapan (PH).

== Definition ==
=== Polling districts ===
According to the federal gazette issued on 30 March 2018, the Berapit constituency is divided into 8 polling districts.

State constituency	Polling District	Code	Location
Berapit (N13)	Kampong Aston	045/13/01	SM Persendirian Jit Sin
Berapit (N13)	Bukit Noning	045/13/02	SJK (C) Perkampungan Berapit
Berapit (N13)	Taman Bukit Ria	045/13/03	SJK (C) Kim Sen
Berapit (N13)	Kampong Bahru	045/13/04	SK Kampung Bahru
Berapit (N13)	Jalan Berjaya	045/13/05	SMK Bukit Mertajam
Berapit (N13)	Taman Alma	045/13/06	SMK Jalan Damai
Berapit (N13)	Mutiara Indah	045/13/07	SMK Berapit
Berapit (N13)	Taman Tenang	045/13/08	SM Sains Tun Syed Sheh Shahabudin

== Demographics ==
Ethnic breakdown of Berapit's electorate as of 2023
1. Chinese (83.6%)
2. Indian (10.8%)
3. Malay (5.06%)
4. Other ethnicities (0.60%)

Total electors by polling district in 2016
Polling district	Electors
Kampong Aston	3,193
Bukit Noning	3,210
Taman Bukit Ria	2,260
Kampong Bahru	1,789
Jalan Berjaya	1,400
Taman Alma	3,401
Mutiara Indah	2,386
Taman Tenang	5,042
Total	22,681
Source: Malaysian Election Commission

== History ==
Penang State Legislative Assemblyman for Berapit
Assembly	No	Years	Member	Party
Constituency created from Pekan Bukit Mertajam and Machang Bubok
7th	N13	1986 – 1990	Chian Heng Kai (陈庆佳)	DAP
8th	N13	1990 – 1995	Wong Hang Yoke (王康力)	DAP
9th	N13	1995 – 1999	Lau Chiek Tuan (刘一端)	BN (MCA)
10th	N13	1999 – 2004	Lau Chiek Tuan (刘一端)	BN (MCA)
11th	N13	2004 – 2008	Lau Chiek Tuan (刘一端)	BN (MCA)
12th	N13	2008 – 2013	Ong Kok Fooi (王国慧)	PR (DAP)
13th	N13	2013 – 2018	Ong Kok Fooi (王国慧)	PR (DAP)
14th	N13	2018 – 2023	Heng Lee Lee (王丽丽)	PH (DAP)
15th	N13	2023–present	Heng Lee Lee (王丽丽)	PH (DAP)

== Election results ==
The electoral results for the Berapit state constituency from 1986 to 2018 are as follows.

Penang state election, 2023: Berapit
Party	Candidate	Votes	%	∆%
PH	Heng Lee Lee	19,183	94.40	▲2.30
PN	Lee Kok Keong	1,130	5.60	▲5.60
Total valid votes		20,313	100.00	
Total rejected ballots		154		
Unreturned ballots		19		
Turnout		20,486	70.46	▼14.54
Registered electors		29,076		
Majority		18,053	88.80	▲3.70
PH hold		Swing		

Penang state election, 2018: Berapit
Party	Candidate	Votes	%	∆%
PKR	Heng Lee Lee	18,378	92.10	▲92.10
BN	Goh Swee Gim	1,397	7.00	▼4.60
Penang Front Party	Lee Poh Kong	105	0.50	▲0.50
Parti Rakyat Malaysia	Song Chee Meng	84	0.40	▲0.40
Total valid votes		19,964	100.00	
Total rejected ballots		202		
Unreturned ballots		41		
Turnout		20,207	85.00	▼1.60
Registered electors		23,779		
Majority		16,981	85.10	▲8.30
PH hold		Swing		
Source(s) "His Majesty's Government Gazette - Notice of Contested Election, State Legislative Assembly for the State of Penang [P.U. (B) 252/2018]" (PDF). Attorney General's Chambers of Malaysia. 3 May 2018. "Federal Government Gazette - Results of Contested Election and Statements of the Poll after the Official Addition of Votes, State Constituencies for the State of Penang [P.U. (B) 326/2018]" (PDF). Attorney General's Chambers of Malaysia. 28 May 2018. Archived from the original (PDF) on 29 August 2019.

Penang state election, 2013: Berapit
Party	Candidate	Votes	%	∆%
DAP	Ong Kok Fooi	16,995	88.40	▲23.10
BN	Lau Chiek Tuan	2,230	11.60	▼23.10
Total valid votes		19,225	100.00	
Total rejected ballots		165		
Unreturned ballots		0		
Turnout		19,390	86.60	▲8.50
Registered electors		22,394		
Majority		14,765	76.80	▲46.20
DAP hold		Swing		
Source(s) "Federal Government Gazette - Notice of Contested Election, State Legislative Assembly for the State of Penang [P.U. (B) 189/2013]" (PDF). Attorney General's Chambers of Malaysia. 26 April 2013. "Federal Government Gazette - Results of Contested Election and Statements of the Poll after the Official Addition of Votes, State Constituencies for the State of Penang [P.U. (B) 230/2013]" (PDF). Attorney General's Chambers of Malaysia. 22 May 2013. Archived from the original (PDF) on 22 March 2019.

Penang state election, 2008: Berapit
Party	Candidate	Votes	%	∆%
DAP	Ong Kok Fooi	10,006	65.30	▲29.00
BN	Lau Chiek Tuan	5,314	34.70	▼29.00
Total valid votes		15,320	100.00	
Total rejected ballots		197		
Unreturned ballots		13		
Turnout		15,530	78.10	▲1.80
Registered electors		19,895		
Majority		4,692	30.60	▲3.20
DAP gain from BN		Swing		?
Source(s): 1. "Keputusan Pilihan Raya Umum Parlimen dan Dewan Undangan Negeri Bagi Tahun 2008". Suruhanjaya Pilihan Raya Malaysia.

Penang state election, 2004: Berapit
Party	Candidate	Votes	%	∆%
BN	Lau Chiek Tuan	9,199	63.70	▲4.60
DAP	Tan Khong Chong	5,233	36.30	▼4.60
Total valid votes		14,432	100.00	
Total rejected ballots		269		
Unreturned ballots		373		
Turnout		15,074	76.30	▼1.30
Registered electors		19,745		
Majority		3,966	27.40	▲9.20
BN hold		Swing		?
Source(s): 1. "Keputusan Pilihan Raya Umum Parlimen dan Dewan Undangan Negeri Bagi Tahun 2004". Suruhanjaya Pilihan Raya Malaysia.

Penang state election, 1999: Berapit
Party	Candidate	Votes	%	∆%
BN	Lau Chiek Tuan	8,420	59.10	▼1.20
DAP	Chong Eng	5,826	40.90	▲1.20
Total valid votes		14,246	100.00	
Total rejected ballots		279		
Unreturned ballots		24		
Turnout		14,549	77.60	▲0.10
Registered electors		18,738		
Majority		2,594	18.20	▼2.40
BN hold		Swing		
Source(s): 1. "Keputusan Pilihan Raya Umum Parlimen dan Dewan Undangan Negeri Bagi Tahun 1999". Suruhanjaya Pilihan Raya Malaysia.

Penang state election, 1995: Berapit
Party	Candidate	Votes	%	∆%
BN	Lau Chiek Tuan	8,242	60.30	▲25.80
DAP	Gooi Seong Kin	5,435	39.70	▼25.80
Total valid votes		13,677	100.00	
Total rejected ballots		277		
Unreturned ballots		32		
Turnout		13,986	77.50	▼0.20
Registered electors		18,047		
Majority		2,807	20.60	▼10.40
BN hold		Swing		?
Source(s): 1. "Keputusan Pilihan Raya Umum Parlimen dan Dewan Undangan Negeri Bagi Tahun 1995". Suruhanjaya Pilihan Raya Malaysia.

Penang state election, 1990: Berapit
Party	Candidate	Votes	%	∆%
DAP	Wong Hang Yoke	10,110	65.50	▲5.10
BN	Khaw Keng Hong	5,316	34.50	▲5.00
Total valid votes		15,426	100.00	
Total rejected ballots		302		
Unreturned ballots		0		
Turnout		15,728	77.70	▲3.30
Registered electors		20,247		
Majority		4,794	31.00	▲0.10
BN hold		Swing		
Source(s): 1. "Keputusan Pilihan Raya Umum Parlimen dan Dewan Undangan Negeri Bagi Tahun 1990". Suruhanjaya Pilihan Raya Malaysia.

Penang state election, 1986: Berapit
Party	Candidate	Votes	%
DAP	Chian Heng Kai	8,949	60.40
BN	Oh Teck Auan	4,374	29.50
Independent	Seow Hun Khim	1,449	9.70
SDP	Khaw Teik Hock	47	0.30
Total valid votes		14,819	100.00
Total rejected ballots		327	
Unreturned ballots		0	
Turnout		15,146	74.40
Registered electors		20,346	
Majority		4,575	30.90
This was a new constituency created.
Source(s): 1. "Keputusan Pilihan Raya Umum Parlimen dan Dewan Undangan Negeri Bagi Tahun 1986". Suruhanjaya Pilihan Raya Malaysia.

== See also ==
- Constituencies of Penang
