= Jit Sin Independent High School =

School in Bukit Mertajam, Penang, Malaysia

- Sekolah Menengah Persendirian Jit Sin 日新独立中学

Location
- 1703, Jalan Aston,14000 Bukit Mertajam, Pulau Pinang; Bukit Mertajam, Penang, Central Seberang Perai District; Malaysia

Information
- Type: Independent
- Motto: 敬、爱、勤、朴
- Established: 2 March 1918
- Principal: TANG ENG HOE (陈芃宏)
- Website: www.jitsin-ind.edu.my
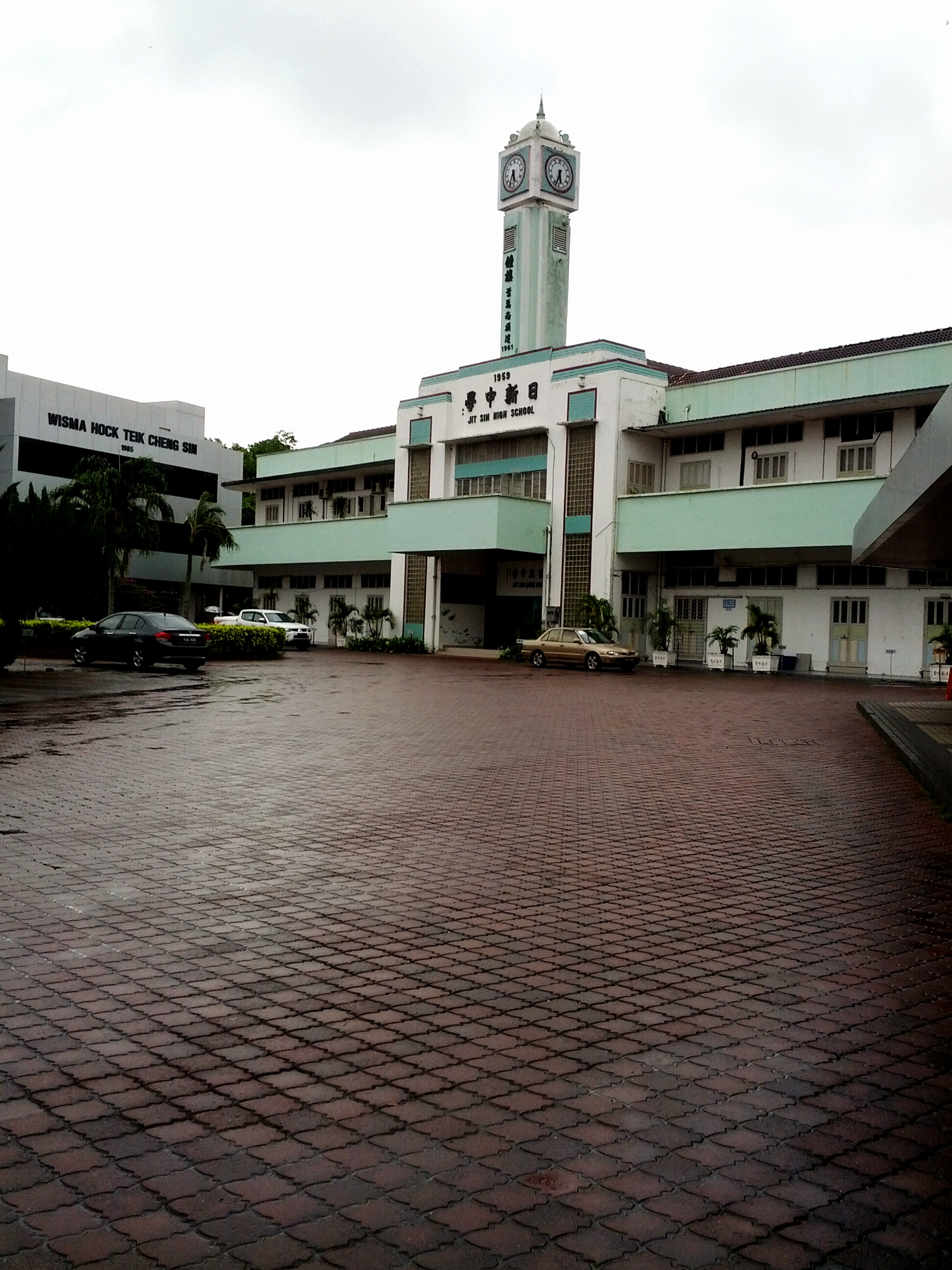
- View of Jit Sin Independent High School Clocktower after rain.

Jit Sin Independent High School
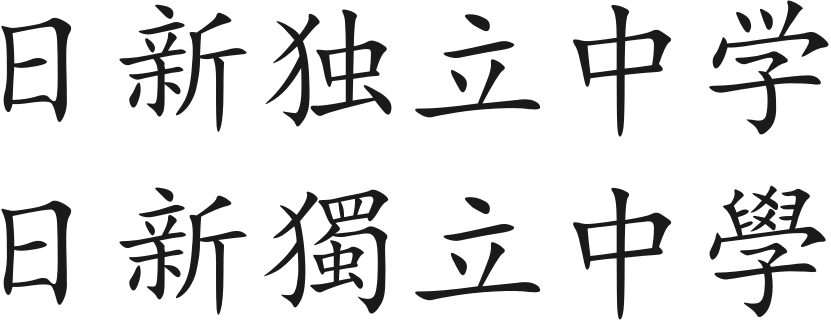
- Jit Sin Independent High School in Simplified Chinese (top) and Traditional Chinese character (below)
- Traditional Chinese: 日新獨立中學
- Simplified Chinese: 日新独立中学
Transcriptions
Standard Mandarin
- Hanyu Pinyin: Rìxīn Dúlì Zhōngxué
Southern Min
- Hokkien POJ: Ji̍t-sin To̍k-li̍p Tiong-o̍h
- Teochew Peng'im: Zi̍k-sing Toh-li̍p Diong-oh

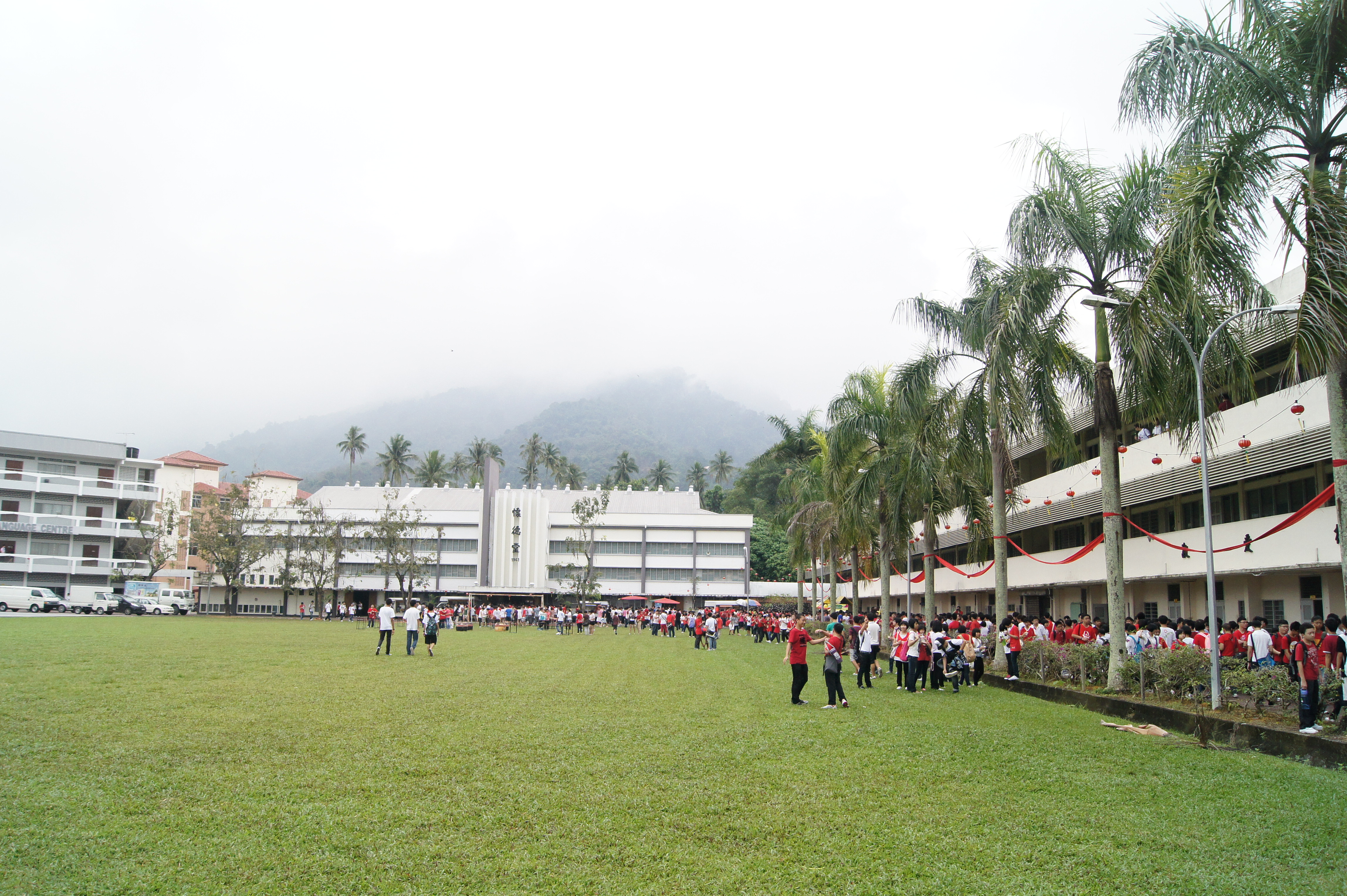
Jit Sin Independent High School Hall

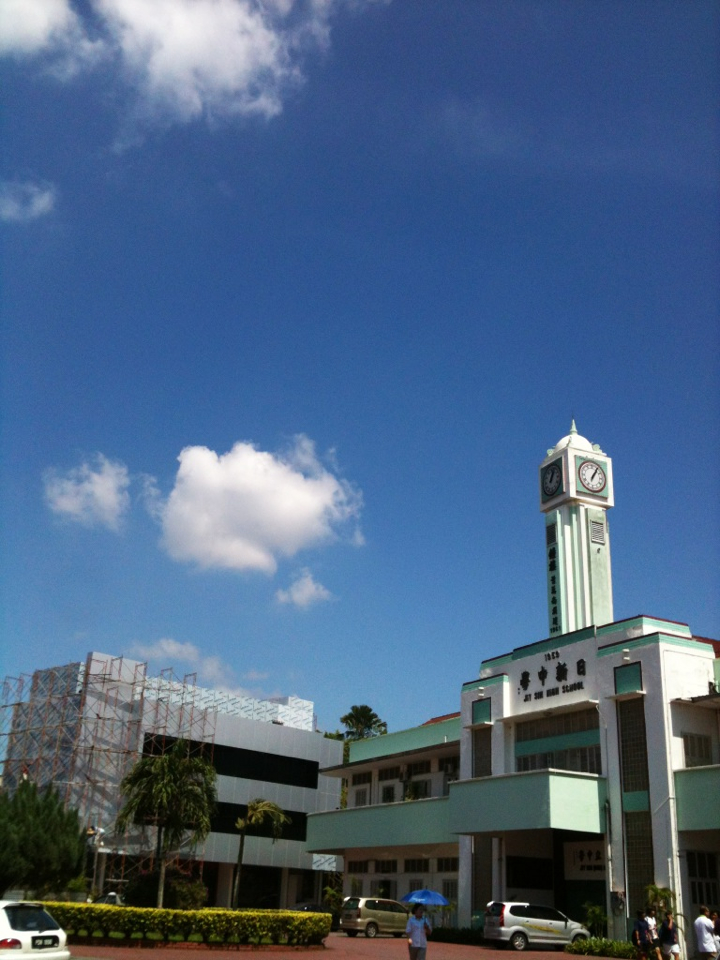
Jit Sin Independent High School

Jit Sin Independent High School (Chinese: 日新独立中学, Malay: Sekolah Menengah Persendirian Jit Sin), a member of Jit Sin, is a Chinese independent high school located in Bukit Mertajam, Penang, Malaysia. It provides various education levels from junior 1 to 3, senior 1 to 3. The school also offers Unified Examination Certificate (UEC) for both junior and senior students and optional choice of Penilaian Menengah Rendah for juniors and Sijil Pelajaran Malaysia for seniors.

== Recognition ==
The school was bestowed "5 stars private education" by Ministry of Education (Malaysia) on 22 July 2013.

== Floral emblem ==
The Floral emblem of Jit Sin (Independent) High School is Cassia fistula also known as the Golden Shower Tree. It was officially announced by the principal on 9 November 2013.

== See also ==
- Bukit Mertajam
