= Machang Bubuk =

State constituency in Penang, Malaysia

Machang Bubuk (N14)
Penang constituency

State constituency
- Legislature: Penang State Legislative Assembly
MLA
Lee Khai Loon
PH
- Constituency created: 1974
- First contested: 1974 (as Machang Bubok)
- Last contested: 2023

Demographics
- Electors (2023): 56,538
- Area (km²): 62

Machang Bubuk is a state constituency in Penang, Malaysia, that has been represented in the Penang State Legislative Assembly.

The state constituency was first contested in 1974 and is mandated to return a single Assemblyman to the Penang State Legislative Assembly under the first-past-the-post voting system. Since 2013, the State Assemblyman for Machang Bubuk is Lee Khai Loon from the Parti Keadilan Rakyat (PKR), which is part of the state's ruling coalition, Pakatan Harapan (PH).

== Definition ==
=== Polling districts ===
According to the federal gazette issued on 30 March 2018, the Machang Bubuk constituency is divided into 11 polling districts.

State constituency	Polling District	Code	Location
Machang Bubuk (N14)	To'Kun	045/14/01	SK Juara
Machang Bubuk (N14)	Machang Bubok	045/14/02	SK Machang Bubok
Machang Bubuk (N14)	Bukit Teh	045/14/03	SK Bukit Teh
Machang Bubuk (N14)	Alma	045/14/04	SJK (C) Sin Ya
Machang Bubuk (N14)	Taman Seri Kijang	045/14/05	SK Alma Jaya
Machang Bubuk (N14)	Bukit Minyak	045/14/06	SMK Alma
Machang Bubuk (N14)	Permatang Tinggi	045/14/07	SJK (C) Permatang Tinggi
Machang Bubuk (N14)	Gajah Mati	045/14/08	SMA Al-Mahadul Islami
Machang Bubuk (N14)	Taman Jambu	045/14/09	SJK (C) Kay Sin
Machang Bubuk (N14)	Taman Seri Janggus	045/14/10	SMK Taman Sejahtera
Machang Bubuk (N14)	Taman Alma Jaya	045/14/11	SK Alma Jaya

== Demographics ==
Ethnic breakdown of Machang Bubuk's electorate as of 2023
1. Chinese (51.4%)
2. Malay (35.2%)
3. Indian (12.7%)
4. Other ethnicities (0.69%)

Total electors by polling district in 2016
Polling district	Electors
To’ Kun	2,859
Machang Bubok	3,647
Bukit Teh	1,252
Alma	1,421
Taman Seri Kijang	4,113
Bukit Minyak	2,147
Permatang Tinggi	3,653
Gajah Mati	1,242
Taman Jambu	2,202
Taman Seri Janggus	5,427
Taman Alma Jaya	4,226
Total	32,189
Source: Malaysian Election Commission

== History ==
The Machang Bubuk state constituency was originally named Machang Bubok when it was created prior to the 1974 State Election. It was then renamed during the 1995 State Election.

Penang State Legislative Assemblyman for Machang Bubuk
Assembly	No	Years	Member	Party
Constituency created from Alma
Machang Bubok
4th	N12	1974 – 1978	Lim Heng Tee (林兴智)	BN (GERAKAN)
5th	N12	1978 – 1982	Lim Heng Tee (林兴智)	BN (GERAKAN)
6th	N12	1982 – 1986	Lim Heng Tee (林兴智)	BN (GERAKAN)
7th	N14	1986 – 1990	Goik Hock Lai (倪福来)	BN (GERAKAN)
8th	N14	1990 – 1995	Goik Hock Lai (倪福来)	BN (GERAKAN)
Machang Bubuk
9th	N14	1995 – 1999	Toh Kin Woon (杜乾焕)	BN (GERAKAN)
10th	N14	1999 – 2004	Toh Kin Woon (杜乾焕)	BN (GERAKAN)
11th	N14	2004 – 2008	Toh Kin Woon (杜乾焕)	BN (GERAKAN)
12th	N14	2008 – 2013	Tan Hock Leong (陈福良)	PR (PKR)
13th	N14	2013 – 2018	Lee Khai Loon (李凯伦)	PR (PKR)
14th	N14	2018 – 2023	Lee Khai Loon (李凯伦)	PH (PKR)
15th	N14	2023–present	Lee Khai Loon (李凯伦)	PH (PKR)

== Election results ==
The electoral results for the Machang Bubuk state constituency from 1974 to 2018 are as follows.

Penang state election, 2023: Machang Bubok
Party	Candidate	Votes	%	∆%
PH	Lee Khai Loon	28,777	69.10	▲0.10
PN	Tan Hum Wei	12,855	30.90	▲30.90
Total valid votes		41,632	100.00	
Total rejected ballots		213		
Unreturned ballots		52		
Turnout		41,897	74.10	▼12.20
Registered electors		56,538		
Majority		15,922	38.20	▼14.80
PH hold		Swing		

Penang state election, 2018: Machang Bubuk
Party	Candidate	Votes	%	∆%
PKR	Lee Khai Loon	21,819	69.00	▼1.70
PAS	Md Jamil Abd Rahman	5,072	16.00	▲16.00
BN	Tan Teik Cheng	4,658	14.70	▼11.90
Parti Rakyat Malaysia	Teng Ah Ba	53	0.20	▲0.20
BERSAMA	Lim Jhun Hou	28	0.10	▲0.10
Total valid votes		31,630	100.00	
Total rejected ballots		376		
Unreturned ballots		132		
Turnout		32,138	86.30	▼3.00
Registered electors		37,260		
Majority		16,747	53.00	▲8.90
PKR hold		Swing		
Source(s) "His Majesty's Government Gazette - Notice of Contested Election, State Legislative Assembly for the State of Penang [P.U. (B) 252/2018]" (PDF). Attorney General's Chambers of Malaysia. 3 May 2018. "Federal Government Gazette - Results of Contested Election and Statements of the Poll after the Official Addition of Votes, State Constituencies for the State of Penang [P.U. (B) 326/2018]" (PDF). Attorney General's Chambers of Malaysia. 28 May 2018. Archived from the original (PDF) on 2019-08-29.

Penang state election, 2013: Machang Bubuk
Party	Candidate	Votes	%	∆%
PKR	Lee Khai Loon	19,080	70.70	▲9.30
BN	Tan Lok Heah	7,180	26.60	▼12.00
Independent	Wan Balkis Wan Abdullah	252	0.90	▲0.90
Independent	Tan Hock Leong	172	0.60	▲0.60
KITA	Vikneswaran Muniandy	159	0.60	▲0.60
Independent	Ooi Suan Hoe	152	0.60	▲0.60
Total valid votes		26,995	100.00	
Total rejected ballots		470		
Unreturned ballots		0		
Turnout		27,465	89.30	▲7.80
Registered electors		30,771		
Majority		11,900	44.10	▲21.30
PKR hold		Swing		
Source(s) "Federal Government Gazette - Notice of Contested Election, State Legislative Assembly for the State of Penang [P.U. (B) 189/2013]" (PDF). Attorney General's Chambers of Malaysia. 26 April 2013. "Federal Government Gazette - Results of Contested Election and Statements of the Poll after the Official Addition of Votes, State Constituencies for the State of Penang [P.U. (B) 230/2013]" (PDF). Attorney General's Chambers of Malaysia. 22 May 2013. Archived from the original (PDF) on 2019-03-22.

Penang state election, 2008: Machang Bubuk
Party	Candidate	Votes	%	∆%
PKR	Tan Hock Leong	11,002	61.40	▲30.00
BN	Lee Kah Choon	6,922	38.60	▼30.00
Total valid votes		17,924	100.00	
Total rejected ballots		349		
Unreturned ballots		6		
Turnout		18,279	81.50	▲1.20
Registered electors		22,424		
Majority		4,080	22.80	▼14.40
PKR gain from BN		Swing		?

Penang state election, 2004: Machang Bubuk
Party	Candidate	Votes	%	∆%
BN	Toh Kin Woon	10,410	68.60	▲12.60
PKR	Lim Boon Tong	4,755	31.40	▼12.60
Total valid votes		15,165	100.00	
Total rejected ballots		352		
Unreturned ballots		2		
Turnout		15,519	80.30	▲1.20
Registered electors		19,338		
Majority		5,655	37.20	▲25.20
BN hold		Swing		
Source(s): 1. "Keputusan Pilihan Raya Umum Parlimen dan Dewan Undangan Negeri Bagi Tahun 2004". Suruhanjaya Pilihan Raya Malaysia.

Penang state election, 1999: Machang Bubuk
Party	Candidate	Votes	%	∆%
BN	Toh Kin Woon	9,631	56.00	▼11.00
PKR	Lim Boon Tong	7,572	44.00	▲44.00
Total valid votes		17,203	100.00	
Total rejected ballots		379		
Unreturned ballots		12		
Turnout		17,594	79.10	▲0.60
Registered electors		22,233		
Majority		2,059	12.00	▼22.00
BN hold		Swing		
Source(s): 1. "Keputusan Pilihan Raya Umum Parlimen dan Dewan Undangan Negeri Bagi Tahun 1999". Suruhanjaya Pilihan Raya Malaysia.

Penang state election, 1995: Machang Bubuk
Party	Candidate	Votes	%	∆%
BN	Toh Kin Woon	10,618	67.00	▲13.60
DAP	Chin Kooi Thoon	5,233	33.00	▼6.50
Total valid votes		15,851	100.00	
Total rejected ballots		412		
Unreturned ballots		16		
Turnout		16,279	78.50	▼2.60
Registered electors		20,732		
Majority		5,385	34.00	▲20.10
BN hold		Swing		
Source(s): 1. "Keputusan Pilihan Raya Umum Parlimen dan Dewan Undangan Negeri Bagi Tahun 1995". Suruhanjaya Pilihan Raya Malaysia.

Penang state election, 1990: Machang Bubok
Party	Candidate	Votes	%	∆%
BN	Goik Hock Lai	7,497	53.40	▲0.20
DAP	Choong Ah Keoh	5,545	39.50	▲6.80
Independent	A. Raman Manap	996	7.10	▲7.10
Total valid votes		14,038	100.00	
Total rejected ballots		338		
Unreturned ballots				
Turnout		14,376	81.10	▲3.50
Registered electors		17,719		
Majority		1,952	13.90	▼6.60
BN hold		Swing		
Source(s): 1. "Keputusan Pilihan Raya Umum Parlimen dan Dewan Undangan Negeri Bagi Tahun 1990". Suruhanjaya Pilihan Raya Malaysia.

Penang state election, 1986: Machang Bubok
Party	Candidate	Votes	%	∆%
BN	Goik Hock Lai	6,426	53.20	▼10.60
DAP	Goh Kheng Huat	3,951	32.70	▲16.20
PAS	Yusof Abdul Latif	1,690	14.00	▼5.60
Total valid votes		12,073	100.00	
Total rejected ballots		301		
Unreturned ballots				
Turnout		12,374	77.60	▼3.60
Registered electors		15,938		
Majority		2,475	20.50	▼23.70
BN hold		Swing		
Source(s): 1. "Keputusan Pilihan Raya Umum Parlimen dan Dewan Undangan Negeri Bagi Tahun 1986". Suruhanjaya Pilihan Raya Malaysia.

Penang state election, 1982: Machang Bubok
Party	Candidate	Votes	%	∆%
BN	Lim Heng Tee	6,859	63.80	▲25.60
PAS	Ahmad Sobki Abdullah	2,110	19.60	▼7.30
DAP	Tan Eng Tut @ Tan Eng Tuck	1,778	16.50	▼15.70
Total valid votes		10,747	100.00	
Total rejected ballots		282		
Unreturned ballots				
Turnout		11,029	81.20	▼1.10
Registered electors		13,576		
Majority		4,749	44.20	▲38.20
BN hold		Swing		
Source(s): 1. Hasan Hamzah (2004). Almanak Keputusan Pilihan Raya Umum: Parlimen & Dewan Undangan Negeri 1959-1999. Shah Alam: Anzagain Sdn. Bhd. ISBN 983-037-152-2.

Penang state election, 1978: Machang Bubok
Party	Candidate	Votes	%	∆%
BN	Lim Heng Tee	3,301	38.20	▼11.80
DAP	Ooi Chew Fong	2,782	32.20	▲0.90
PAS	Hussein Ismail	2,318	26.90	▲26.90
Homeland Consciousness Union	Gurdial Singh	130	1.50	▼5.40
Independent	Ismail Helmy	100	1.20	▲1.20
Total valid votes		8,631	100.00	
Total rejected ballots		400		
Unreturned ballots				
Turnout		9,031	82.30	▲1.20
Registered electors		10,968		
Majority		519	6.00	▼12.70
BN hold		Swing		
Source(s): 1. Hasan Hamzah (2004). Almanak Keputusan Pilihan Raya Umum: Parlimen & Dewan Undangan Negeri 1959-1999. Shah Alam: Anzagain Sdn. Bhd. ISBN 983-037-152-2.

Penang state election, 1974: Machang Bubok
Party	Candidate	Votes	%
BN	Lim Heng Tee	3,198	50.00
DAP	Shaik Adam	2,005	31.30
Homeland Consciousness Union	Syed Abdullah Syed Muhammad	440	6.90
Parti Rakyat Malaysia	Othman Taib	435	6.80
PEKEMAS	Mohd Noor Othman	322	5.00
Total valid votes		6,400	100.00
Total rejected ballots		397	
Unreturned ballots			
Turnout		6,797	81.10
Registered electors		8,386	
Majority		1,193	18.70
This was a new constituency created.
Source(s): 1. Hasan Hamzah (2004). Almanak Keputusan Pilihan Raya Umum: Parlimen & Dewan Undangan Negeri 1959-1999. Shah Alam: Anzagain Sdn. Bhd. ISBN 983-037-152-2.

== See also ==
- Constituencies of Penang
