= Results of the 2008 Malaysian state elections by constituency =

Equal-area representation of the results with each hexagon representing one seat

These are the election results of the 2008 Malaysian general election by state constituency. State assembly elections were held in Malaysia on 8 March 2008 as part of the general elections. These members of the legislative assembly (MLAs) representing their constituency from the first sitting of respective state legislative assembly to its dissolution.

The state legislature election deposit was set at RM 5,000 per candidate. Similar to previous elections, the election deposit will be forfeited if the particular candidate had failed to secure at least 12.5% or one-eighth of the votes.

== Perlis ==
#	Constituency	Winner	Votes	Votes %	Opponent(s)	Votes	Votes %	Majority	Incumbent	Eligible voters	Malay voters	Chinese voters	Indian voters	Others voters	Voter turnout	Voter turnout %	Spoilt votes	Spoilt votes %
N01	Titi Tinggi	Yip Sun Onn (BN–MCA)	3,399	68.60%	Mohamad Razi Mustaffa (IND)	1,585	27.19%	1,814	Loh Yoon Foo (BN–MCA)	7,830	74%	23%	3%		6,068	77.5%	206	0.5%
N01	Titi Tinggi	Yip Sun Onn (BN–MCA)	3,399	68.60%	Keria Senawi (PR–PKR)	846	14.51%	1,814	Loh Yoon Foo (BN–MCA)	7,830	74%	23%	3%		6,068	77.5%	206	0.5%
N02	Beseri	Mat Rawi Kassim (BN–UMNO)	3,123	60.82%	Dzulkefle Mat De (PR–PKR)	2,012	39.18%	1,111	Zahidi Zainul Abidin (BN–UMNO)	6,932	71%	26%		2%	5,265	76.0%	130	2.5%
N03	Chuping	Mansor Jusoh (BN–UMNO)	4,972	69.63%	Mohd. Ali Puteh (PR–PAS)	2,169	30.37%	2,803	Mansor Jusoh (BN–UMNO)	8,825	83%	3%		13%	7,301	82.7%	151	2.1%
N04	Mata Ayer	Khairi Hasan (BN–UMNO)	3,059	68.04%	Wan Kharizal Wan Khazim (PR–PAS)	1,437	31.96%	1,622	Khairi Hasan (BN–UMNO)	5,547	92%	4%		3%	4,662	84.1%	98	2.1%
N05	Santan	Sabry Ahmad (BN–UMNO)	3,475	55.71%	Abdul Rashid Abdul Rahman (PR–PAS)	2,763	44.29%	712	Sabry Ahmad (BN–UMNO)	7,479	99%				6,351	84.9%	101	1.6%
N06	Bintong	Md Isa Sabu (BN–UMNO)	4,882	63.78%	Mohd Anuar Mohd Tahir (PR–PAS)	2,772	36.22%	2,110	Rusli Mat Husin (BN–UMNO)	9,386	95%	3%			7,864	83.8%	184	2.3%
N07	Sena	Abdul Jamil Saad (BN–UMNO)	4,697	62.42%	Osman Abdullah (PR–PAS)	2,828	37.58%	1,869	Azihani Ali (BN–UMNO)	9,604	82%	11%		4%	7,793	81.1%	161	2.1%
N08	Indera Kayangan	Por Choo Chor (BN–MCA)	3,714	60.24%	Poziyah Hamzah (PR–PKR)	2,451	39.76%	1,263	Oui Ah Lan (BN–MCA)	8,517	45%	50%	4%		6,322	74.2%	129	2.0%
N09	Kuala Perlis	Mat Hassan (BN–UMNO)	4,448	69.77%	Ahmad Tajuddin Salleh (PR–PAS)	1,927	30.23%	2,521	Bakar Saad (BN–UMNO)	8,287	77%	23%			6,524	78.7%	135	2.1%
N10	Kayang	Ahmad Bakri Ali (BN–UMNO)	3,913	61.93%	Ya'akub Abu Seman (PR–PAS)	2,405	38.07%	1,508	Azam Rashid (BN–UMNO)	7,797	97%	3%			6,443	82.6%	113	1.8%
N11	Pauh	Syed Razlan Putra Syed Jamalullail (BN–UMNO)	4,461	70.25%	Abu Bakar Ali (PR–PAS)	1,889	29.75%	2,572	Abu Bakar Ismail (BN–UMNO)	8,107	74%	18%	5%		6,527	80.5%	132	2.0%
N12	Tambun Tulang	Shahidan Kassim (BN–UMNO)	4,371	64.93%	Che Nordin Ahmad (PR–PAS)	2,361	35.07%	2,010	Shahidan Kassim (BN–UMNO)	8,683	84%	4%		11%	6,870	79.1%	138	2.0%
N13	Guar Sanji	Jafperi Othman (BN–UMNO)	3,736	55.18%	Ahmad Adnan Fadzil (PR–PAS)	3,034	44.82%	702	Jafperi Othman (BN–UMNO)	8,160	97%	2%			6,879	84.3%	93	1.4%
N14	Simpang Empat	Rus'sele Eizan (PR–PAS)	2,878	50.46%	Zahari Bakar (BN–UMNO)	2,825	49.54%	53	Zahari Bakar (BN–UMNO)	6,981	88%	12%			5,793	83.0%	82	1.4%
N15	Sanglang	Hashim Jasin (PR–PAS)	3,333	50.36%	Abdullah Hassan (BN–UMNO)	3,286	49.64%	149	Hashim Jasin (BA–PAS)	7,946	90%	9%			6,722	84.6%	92	1.4%

== Kedah ==
#	Constituency	Winner	Votes	Votes %	Opponent(s)	Votes	Votes %	Majority	Incumbent	Eligible voters	Malay voters	Chinese voters	Indian voters	Others voters	Voter turnout	Voter turnout %	Spoilt votes	Spoilt votes %
N01	Ayer Hangat	Mohd Rawi Abdul Hamid (BN–UMNO)	6,888	54.4%	Zubir Ahmad (PR–PAS)	5,753	45.5%	1,135	Md Hassan Bulat (BN–UMNO)	16,072	95%	2%	3%		12,951	80.6%	297	2.3%
N02	Kuah	Nawawi Ahmad (BN–UMNO)	6,660	66.4%	Hasrul Muhaimin Hasbi (PR–PKR)	3,336	33.3%	3,324	Nawawi Ahmad (BN–UMNO)	13,495	86%	12%			10,322	76.5%	288	2.8%
N03	Kota Siputeh	Abu Hasan Sarif (BN–UMNO)	8,160	51.5%	Ismail Wan Teh (PR–PAS)	7,665	48.4%	495	Abu Hasan Sarif (BN–UMNO)	19,771	92%	8%			16,126	81.6%	278	1.7%
N04	Ayer Hitam	Abdul Ghani Ahmad (PR–PAS)	10,652	51.2%	Othman Aziz (BN–UMNO)	10,146	48.7%	506	Othman Aziz (BN–UMNO)	25,742	89%	9%		2%	21,171	82.2%	352	1.7%
N05	Bukit Kayu Hitam	Ahmad Zaini Japar (BN–UMNO)	13,219	68.0%	Che On Yusof (PR–PKR)	6,224	32.0%	6,995	Khalidah Abidah Ayob (BN–UMNO)	24,992	96%	2%			19,966	79.9%	523	2.6%
N06	Jitra	Saad Man (BN–UMNO)	12,065	55.2%	Rohani Abd Muttalib (PR–PAS)	9,807	44.8%	2,258	Othman Ishak (BN–UMNO)	28,331	96%	3%	2%		22,245	78.5%	373	1.7%
N07	Kuala Nerang	Syed Sobri Syed Hashim (BN–UMNO)	7,856	52.6%	Zawawi Ahmad (PR–PAS)	7,051	47.2%	805	Affifudin Omar (BN–UMNO)	18,037	97%	2%			15,245	84.5%	309	2.0%
N08	Pedu	Mahdzir Khalid (BN–UMNO)	8,780	59.2%	Zamri Yusuf (PR–PKR)	6,047	40.8%	2,733	Mahdzir Khalid (BN–UMNO)	17,366	88%			11%	15,200	87.5%	364	2.4%
N09	Bukit Lada	Ahmad 'Izzat Mohamad Shauki (PR–PAS)	9,600	50.4%	Ariffin Man (BN–UMNO)	9,392	49.3%	208	Ariffin Man (BN–UMNO)	23,365	89%	8%	2%		19,434	83.2%	395	2.0%
N10	Bukit Pinang	Md Rohsidi Osman (PR–PAS)	11,307	57.3%	Che Omar Saad (BN–UMNO)	7,908	40.1%	3,399	Md Rohsidi Osman (BA–PAS)	24,202	92%	6%			20,101	83.1%	372	1.9%
N11	Derga	Cheah Soon Hai (BN–GERAKAN)	6,516	43.3%	Cheung Khai Yan (PR–PKR)	6,353	42.2%	163	Cheung Khai Yan (BN–GERAKAN)	22,064	55%	40%	4%		15,783	71.5%	740	4.7%
N11	Derga	Cheah Soon Hai (BN–GERAKAN)	6,516	43.3%	Teoh Teik Guan (PR–DAP)	2,095	13.9%	163	Cheung Khai Yan (BN–GERAKAN)	22,064	55%	40%	4%		15,783	71.5%	740	4.7%
N12	Bakar Bata	Ahmad Bashah Md Hanipah (BN–UMNO)	8,232	51.0%	Rohani Bakar (PR–PKR)	7,874	48.7%	358	Ahmad Bashah Md Hanipah (BN–UMNO)	22,695	68%	27%	5%		16,395	72.2%	240	1.5%
N13	Kota Darul Aman	Lee Guan Aik (PR–DAP)	5,415	53.8%	Chong Kau Chai @ Chong Itt Chew (BN–MCA)	4,611	45.8%	804	Chong Kau Chai @ Chong Itt Chew (BN–MCA)	15,087	34%	60%	6%		10,355	68.6%	280	2.7%
N14	Alor Mengkudu	Ismail Salleh (PR–PAS)	9,208	56.8%	Mazlan Abdul Rahman (BN–UMNO)	6,961	43.0%	2,247	Fadzil Hanafi (BN–UMNO)	21,175	75%	23%	3%		16,460	77.7%	251	1.5%
N15	Anak Bukit	Amiruddin Hamzah (PR–PAS)	12,493	59.0%	Harisfadzillah Husain (BN–UMNO)	8,687	41.0%	3,806	Amiruddin Hamzah (BA–PAS)	26,217	89%	10%			21,877	83.5%	697	3.2%
N16	Kubang Rotan	Mohd Nasir Mustafa (PR–PAS)	11,550	53.2%	Nordin Salleh (BN–UMNO)	10,163	46.8%	1,387	Syed Razak Syed Zain Barakbah (BN–UMNO)	28,817	71%	27%			22,050	76.5%	335	1.5%
N17	Pengkalan Kundor	Phahrolrazi Zawawi (PR–PAS)	12,575	57.1%	Mohd Jamil Md Idross (BN–UMNO)	9,453	42.9%	3,122	Mohd Jamil Md Idross (BN–UMNO)	28,108	78%	21%			22,285	79.3%	257	1.2%
N18	Tokai	Mohamed Taulan Mat Rasul (PR–PAS)	16,271	62.7%	Fatimah Ismail (BN–UMNO)	9,693	37.3%	6,578	Mohamed Taulan Mat Rasul (BA–PAS)	31,117	91%	9%			26,246	84.4%	282	1.1%
N19	Sungai Tiang	Suraya Yaacob (BN–UMNO)	13,871	56.1%	Ab Muthalib Awang (PR–PAS)	10,865	43.9%	3,006	Suraya Yaacob (BN–UMNO)	30,229	86%	3%		10%	25,296	83.7%	560	2.2%
N20	Sungai Limau	Azizan Abdul Razak (PR–PAS)	12,028	57.7%	Basorri Abu Hassan (BN–UMNO)	8,816	42.3%	3,212	Azizan Abdul Razak (BA–PAS)	25,189	93%	7%			21,128	83.9%	284	1.3%
N21	Guar Chempedak	Ku Abd Rahman Ku Ismail (BN–UMNO)	7,898	56.3%	Mohamad Ismail (PR–PAS)	6,139	43.7%	1,759	Abdul Razak Hashim (BN–UMNO)	18,211	87%	12%			14,242	78.2%	205	1.4%
N22	Gurun	Leong Yong Kong (BN–MCA)	8,589	55.0%	Kalai Vanar Bala Sundram (PR–PKR)	7,035	45.0%	1,554	Beh Heng Siong (BN–MCA)	22,339	56%	24%	18%		16,422	73.5%	798	4.9%
N23	Belantek	Mohd Tajuddin Abdullah (BN–UMNO)	8,226	50.7%	Muhammad Sanusi Md Nor (PR–PAS)	7,974	49.2%	252	Mohd Isa Shafie (BA–PAS)	19,016	93%	2%		4%	16,475	86.6%	254	1.5%
N24	Jeneri	Yahya Abdullah (PR–PAS)	8,608	47.9%	Hasbullah L. Isa (BN–UMNO)	8,441	47.0%	167	Ismail Harun (BN–UMNO)	21,323	93%			6%	18,220	85.5%	251	1.4%
N25	Bukit Selambau	Arumugam Vengatarakoo (IND)	13,225	54.9%	Krishnan Subramaniam (BN–MIC)	10,863	45.1%	2,362	Saravanan Velia Udayar (BN–MIC)	34,977	50%	19%	30%		25,798	73.8%	1,694	6.6%
N26	Tanjong Dawai	Hamdan Mohamed Khalib (PR–PAS)	11,497	49.4%	Arzmi Hamid (BN–UMNO)	11,418	49.1%	79	Arzmi Hamid (BN–UMNO)	29,466	81%	13%	5%		23,884	81.1%	618	2.6%
N27	Pantai Merdeka	Abdullah Jusoh (PR–PAS)	11,654	51.0%	Shuib Saedin (BN–UMNO)	11,151	48.8%	503	Shuib Saedin (BN–UMNO)	27,784	83%	10%	7%		23,139	83.3%	296	1.3%
N28	Bakar Arang	Tan Wei Shu (PR–PKR)	10,489	52.4%	Seng Kooh Huat (BN–MCA)	9,159	45.8%	1,330	Seng Kooh Huat (BN–MCA)	27,574	43%	48%	9%		20,496	74.3%	490	2.4%
N28	Bakar Arang	Tan Wei Shu (PR–PKR)	10,489	52.4%	Lim Pok Long (IND)	287	1.4%	1,330	Seng Kooh Huat (BN–MCA)	27,574	43%	48%	9%		20,496	74.3%	490	2.4%
N29	Sidam	Tan Joon Long @ Tan Chow Kang (PR–PKR)	9,470	61.7%	Fong Chok Gin (BN–GERAKAN)	5,852	38.1%	3,618	Fong Chok Gin (BN–GERAKAN)	20,926	39%	40%	20%		15,749	75.3%	392	2.5%
N30	Bayu	Azmi Che Husain (BN–UMNO)	12,590	52.0%	Musoddak Ahmad (PR–PAS)	11,606	48.0%	984	Mohd Salleh Yaacob (BN–UMNO)	29,197	93%	5%		2%	24,519	84.0%	322	1.3%
N31	Kupang	Johari Abdullah (PR–PAS)	11,627	55.0%	Ismail Abu Bakar (BN–UMNO)	9,533	45.1%	2,094	Ismail Abu Bakar (BN–UMNO)	25,726	90%	5%	4%		21,494	83.6%	334	1.6%
N32	Kuala Ketil	Md Zuki Yusof (PR–PAS)	12,105	62.5%	Firdaus Zakaria (BN–UMNO)	7,225	37.3%	4,880	Abd. Aziz Sheikh Fadzir (BN–UMNO)	23,861	81%	7%	11%		19,697	82.6%	338	1.7%
N33	Merbau Pulas	Siti Aishah Ghazali (PR–PAS)	12,224	58.6%	Mohd Hadzir Ismail (BN–UMNO)	8,648	41.4%	3,576	Mohd Hadzir Ismail (BN–UMNO)	26,832	63%	14%	22%		21,355	79.6%	483	2.3%
N34	Lunas	Mohammad Razhi Salleh (PR–PKR)	17,836	70.4%	Ananthan Somasundaram (BN–MIC)	7,513	29.6%	10,323	Ganesan Subramaniam (BN–MIC)	32,386	47%	30%	23%		25,711	79.4%	360	1.4%
N35	Kulim	Lim Soo Nee (PR–PKR)	10,559	49.8%	Lim Lee Choo (BN–MCA)	9,315	43.9%	1,244	Boey Chin Gan (BN–MCA)	28,598	63%	21%	16%		21,751	76.1%	554	2.6%
N35	Kulim	Lim Soo Nee (PR–PKR)	10,559	49.8%	Khairul Anuar Ramli (IND)	1,101	5.2%	1,244	Boey Chin Gan (BN–MCA)	28,598	63%	21%	16%		21,751	76.1%	554	2.6%
N36	Bandar Baharu	Yaakub Hussin (PR–PAS)	9,709	54.0%	Azimi Daim (BN–UMNO)	7,860	43.7%	1,849	Azimi Daim (BN–UMNO)	23,397	77%	16%	7%		18,431	78.8%	456	2.5%
N36	Bandar Baharu	Yaakub Hussin (PR–PAS)	9,709	54.0%	Abdul Aziz Majid (IND)	377	2.1%	1,849	Azimi Daim (BN–UMNO)	23,397	77%	16%	7%		18,431	78.8%	456	2.5%

== Kelantan ==
#	Constituency	Winner	Votes	Votes %	Opponent(s)	Votes	Votes %	Majority	Incumbent	Eligible voters	Malay voters	Chinese voters	Indian voters	Others voters	Voter turnout	Voter turnout %	Spoilt votes	Spoilt votes %
N01	Pengkalan Kubor	Noor Zahidi Omar (BN–UMNO)	7,643	50.2%	Hassan Berahim (PR–PKR)	7,543	49.5%	100	Noor Zahidi Omar (BN–UMNO)	20,311	91%			7%	15,488	76.3%	263	1.7%
N02	Kelaboran	Mohamad Zaki Ibrahim (PR–PAS)	8,656	57.1%	Wan Hanapi Wan Yaacob (BN–UMNO)	6,444	42.5%	2,212	Mohamad Zaki Ibrahim (BA–PAS)	18,990	88%	3%		8%	15,366	80.9%	213	1.4%
N03	Pasir Pekan	Ahmad Yaakob (PR–PAS)	11,106	62.6%	Md Noor Yaacob (BN–UMNO)	6,590	37.2%	4,516	Ahmad Yaakob (BA–PAS)	21,462	99%				17,991	83.8%	253	1.4%
N04	Wakaf Bharu	Che Abdullah Mat Nawi (PR–PAS)	8,405	51.9%	Mohd Rosdi Ab Aziz (BN–UMNO)	7,745	47.9%	660	Mohd Rosdi Ab Aziz (BN–UMNO)	19,309	90%	8%		2%	16,417	85.0%	235	1.4%
N05	Kijang	Wan Ubaidah Omar (PR–PAS)	0		Unopposed	0		0	Husam Musa (BA–PAS)	16,265	96%	4%						
N06	Chempaka	Nik Abdul Aziz Nik Mat (PR–PAS)	9,514	64.1%	Nik Mohd Zain Omar (BN–UMNO)	5,265	35.5%	4,249	Nik Abdul Aziz Nik Mat (BA–PAS)	17,818	99%				15,077	84.6%	242	1.6%
N07	Panchor	Nik Mohd. Amar Nik Abdullah (PR–PAS)	9,148	61.0%	Dali Husin (BN–UMNO)	5,711	38.1%	3,437	Nik Mohd Amar Nik Abdullah (BA–PAS)	18,267	98%				15,194	83.2%	190	1.3%
N08	Tanjong Mas	Rohani Ibrahim (PR–PAS)	11,095	68.8%	Khazuni Othman (BN–UMNO)	4,983	30.9%	6,112	Rohani Ibrahim (BA–PAS)	20,537	93%	7%			16,273	79.2%	155	1.0%
N09	Kota Lama	Anuar Tan Abdullah (PR–PAS)	12,867	62.7%	Tan Ken Ten (BN–MCA)	7,661	37.3%	5,206	Anuar Tan Abdullah (BA–PAS)	27,038	63%	35%	2%		20,804	76.9%	276	1.3%
N10	Bunut Payong	Takiyuddin Hassan (PR–PAS)	10,360	63.3%	Rosmadi Ismail (BN–UMNO)	6,019	36.8%	4,341	Takiyuddin Hassan (BA–PAS)	20,688	92%	7%			16,525	79.9%	146	0.9%
N11	Tendong	Muhammad Md Daud (PR–PAS)	8,105	55.6%	Mohd Fauzi Muhammad (BN–UMNO)	6,448	44.2%	1,657	Mohd Fauzi Muhammad (BN–UMNO)	17,741	98%	2%			14,792	83.4%	207	1.4%
N12	Pengkalan Pasir	Hanifa Ahmad (PR–PAS)	10,377	56.2%	Hanafi Mamat (BN–UMNO)	8,029	43.5%	2,348	Wan Abdul Aziz Wan Jaafar (BA–PAS)	22,582	95%	4%			18,740	83.0%	274	1.5%
N13	Chetok	Abdul Halim Abdul Rahman (PR–PAS)	9,107	58.4%	Abdul Rahim Abdul Rahman (BN–UMNO)	6,437	41.3%	2,670	Abdul Halim Abdul Rahman (BA–PAS)	19,317	95%	5%			15,814	81.9%	226	1.4%
N14	Meranti	Mohd. Nassuruddin Daud (PR–PAS)	7,237	63.7%	Abdullah Mat Yasim (BN–UMNO)	4,102	36.1%	3,135	Mohd Nassuruddin Daud (BA–PAS)	14,534	99%				11,509	79.2%	145	1.3%
N15	Gual Periok	Mohamad Awang (PR–PAS)	6,915	52.1%	Shaari Mat Hussain (BN–UMNO)	6,182	46.6%	733	Shaari Mat Hussain (BN–UMNO)	18,162	97%	2%			13,514	74.4%	237	1.8%
N15	Gual Periok	Mohamad Awang (PR–PAS)	6,915	52.1%	Mohammad Zulkifle Abdul Rashid (IND)	147	1.1%	733	Shaari Mat Hussain (BN–UMNO)	18,162	97%	2%			13,514	74.4%	237	1.8%
N16	Bukit Tuku	Abdul Fatah Haron (PR–PAS)	5,340	52.1%	Mohd Zain Ismail (BN–UMNO)	4,884	47.7%	456	Mohd Zain Ismail (BN–UMNO)	12,688	96%			4%	10,428	82.2%	178	1.7%
N17	Salor	Husam Musa (PR–PAS)	8,329	61.8%	Ismail Mamat (BN–UMNO)	5,097	37.8%	3,232	Buni Amin Hamzah (BA–PAS)	16,528	98%	2%			13,662	82.7%	186	1.4%
N18	Pasir Tumboh	Ahmad Baihaki Atiqullah (PR–PAS)	7,779	63.9%	Anuar Safian (BN–UMNO)	4,376	35.9%	3,403	Ahmad Baihaki Atiqullah (BA–PAS)	14,827	99%				12,292	82.9%	113	0.9%
N19	Demit	Muhamad Mustafa (PR–PAS)	11,547	63.0%	Muhammad Abdul Ghani (BN–UMNO)	6,748	36.8%	4,799	Mohamed Daud (BA–PAS)	22,141	98%	2%			18,512	83.6%	169	0.9%
N20	Tawang	Hassan Mohamood (PR–PAS)	11,068	58.6%	Ibrahim Mat Din (BN–UMNO)	7,790	41.3%	3,278	Hassan Mohamood (BA–PAS)	22,167	99%				19,129	86.3%	245	1.3%
N21	Perupok	Omar Mohammed (PR–PAS)	9,505	53.5%	Awang Adek Hussin (BN–UMNO)	8,235	46.3%	1,270	Omar Mohammed (BA–PAS)	21,017	98%	2%			18,024	85.8%	242	1.3%
N22	Jelawat	Abdul Azziz Kadir (PR–PAS)	9,629	52.7%	Ilias Husain (BN–UMNO)	8,607	47.1%	1,022	Ilias Husain (BN–UMNO)	21,624	96%			3%	18,533	85.7%	262	1.4%
N23	Melor	Wan Ismail Wan Jusoh (PR–PAS)	8,390	55.2%	Azmi Ishak (BN–UMNO)	6,774	44.6%	1,616	Azmi Ishak (BN–UMNO)	18,607	97%	2%			15,405	82.8%	213	1.4%
N24	Kadok	Azami Md. Nor (PR–PAS)	6,972	57.3%	Roslan Ab Hamid (BN–UMNO)	5,169	42.5%	1,803	Shamsudin @ Mohamed Shukri Ab Rahman (BA–PAS)	14,436	98%	2%			12,308	85.3%	136	1.1%
N25	Kok Lanas	Md Alwi Che Ahmad (BN–UMNO)	8,319	51.0%	Ahmad Rusli Iberahim (PR–PAS)	7,739	47.4%	580	Annuar Musa (BN–UMNO)	19,197	96%	2%		2%	16,652	86.7%	340	2.0%
N26	Bukit Panau	Abdul Fattah Mahmood (PR–PAS)	10,129	62.7%	Nik Kemaruzaman Sulong (BN–UMNO)	5,946	36.8%	4,183	Abdul Fattah Mahmood (BA–PAS)	20,442	90%	9%			16,337	79.9%	180	1.1%
N27	Gual Ipoh	Wan Yusoff Wan Mustapha (PR–PAS)	6,073	57.9%	Hashim Shafin (BN–UMNO)	4,410	42.1%	1,663	Hashim Shafin (BN–UMNO)	12,955	96%		2%		10,640	82.1%	155	1.5%
N28	Kemahang	Md. Anizam Ab. Rahman (PR–PAS)	5,481	60.6%	Zianon Abdin Ali (BN–UMNO)	3,549	39.2%	1,932	Md Anizam Ab Rahman (BA–PAS)	10,950	99%				9,149	83.6%	103	1.1%
N29	Selising	Saipul Bahrin Mohamad (PR–PAS)	6,737	53.0%	Hashim Ismail (BN–UMNO)	5,954	46.8%	783	Saipul Bahrin Mohamad (BA–PAS)	15,458	99%				12,892	83.4%	172	1.3%
N30	Limbongan	Zainuddin Awang Hamat (PR–PAS)	8,622	55.0%	Che Min Che Ahmad (BN–UMNO)	6,989	44.6%	1,633	Zainuddin Awang Hamat (BA–PAS)	19,519	96%	3%			15,904	81.5%	224	1.4%
N31	Semerak	Wan Hassan Wan Ibrahim (PR–PAS)	6,943	53.1%	Kamaruddin Md Nor (BN–UMNO)	6,112	46.8%	831	Kamaruddin Md Nor (BN–UMNO)	15,584	98%			2%	13,245	85.0%	171	1.3%
N32	Gaal	Nik Mazian Nik Mohamad (PR–PAS)	5,941	51.3%	Tuan Mustaffa Tuan Mat (BN–UMNO)	5,618	48.5%	323	Nik Mazian Nik Mohamad (BA–PAS)	13,832	99%				11,732	84.8%	153	1.3%
N33	Pulai Chondong	Zulkifli Mamat (PR–PAS)	7,205	55.8%	Mohd Asri Meiah (BN–UMNO)	5,670	43.9%	1,535	Zulkifli Mamat (BA–PAS)	15,425	96%	4%			13,046	4.6%	133	1.0%
N34	Temangan	Mohamed Fadzli Hassan (PR–PAS)	7,120'	54.7%	Rahimah Mahamad (BN–UMNO)	5,881	45.2%	1,239	Hassan Muhamad (BA–PAS)	15,474	94%	6%			13,147	85.0%	132	1.0%
N35	Kemuning	Wan Ahmad Lutfi Wan Sulaiman (PR–PAS)	8,003	53.0%	Ahmad Jazlan Yaakub (BN–UMNO)	7,087	46.9%	916	Zakaria Yaacob (BA–PAS)	18,258	96%	3%			15,281	83.7%	169	1.1%
N36	Bukit Bunga	Mohd Adhan Kechik (BN–UMNO)	5,731	51.3%	Sufely Abd Razak (PR–PAS)	5,383	48.2%	348	Mohd Adhan Kechik (BN–UMNO)	13,935	99%				11,406	81.9%	239	2.1%
N37	Air Lanas	Abdullah Ya'kub (PR–PAS)	5,690	53.5%	Azmi Setapa (BN–UMNO)	4,895	46.0%	795	Mustapa Mohamed (BN–UMNO)	12,607	98%				10,759	85.3%	123	1.1%
N38	Kuala Balah	Abdul Aziz Derashid (BN–UMNO)	4,772	57.9%	Mat Sulaiman Daud (PR–PKR)	3,391	41.1%	1,381	Abdul Aziz Derashid (BN–UMNO)	9,756	99%				8,390	86.0%	142	1.7%
N39	Mengkebang	Abdul Latiff Abdul Rahman (PR–PAS)	7,007	57.8%	Azizzuddin Hussein (BN–UMNO)	5,104	42.1%	1,903	Azizzuddin Hussein (BN–UMNO)	14,422	96%	2%	2%		12,315	85.4%	183	1.5%
N40	Guchil	Tuan Zamri Ariff Zakaria (PR–PKR)	6,784	53.7%	Shamshul Ikhwan Ashari Azmi (BN–UMNO)	5,784	45.8%	1,000	Shamshul Ikhwan Ashari Azmi (BN–UMNO)	16,829	83%	13%	3%		12,925	76.8%	298	2.3%
N41	Manek Urai	Ismail Yaacob (PR–PAS)	5,746	56.6%	Mohamed Zulkepli Omar (BN–UMNO)	4,394	43.2%	1,352	Mohamed Zulkepli Omar (BN–UMNO)	12,292	99%				10,353	84.2%	192	1.9%
N42	Dabong	Arifabillah @ Mohd Asri Ibrahim (PR–PAS)	3,906	53.7%	Ramzi Ab Rahman (BN–UMNO)	3,354	46.1%	552	Ramzi Ab Rahman (BN–UMNO)	8,707	99%				7,419	85.2%	150	2.0%
N43	Nenggiri	Mat Yusoff Abdul Ghani (BN–UMNO)	4,543	64.8%	Mohd Zuki Ibrahim (PR–PKR)	2,453	35.0%	2,090	Mat Yusoff Abdul Ghani (BN–UMNO)	8,611	86%			14%	7,214	83.8%	204	2.8%
N44	Paloh	Nozula Mat Diah (BN–UMNO)	5,697	66.4%	Reizal Abdul Rahim (PR–PKR)	2,864	33.4%	2,833	Nozula Mat Diah (BN–UMNO)	10,045	99%				8,713	86.7%	135	1.6%
N45	Galas	Che Hashim Sulaiman (PR–PAS)	4,399	53.7%	Mohamad Saufi Deraman (BN–UMNO)	3,753	45.9%	646	Mohamad Saufi Deraman (BN–UMNO)	10,330	65%	22%		11%	8,356	80.9%	171	2.1%

== Terengganu ==
#	Constituency	Winner	Votes	Votes %	Opponent(s)	Votes	Votes %	Majority	Incumbent	Eligible voters	Malay voters	Chinese voters	Indian voters	Others voters	Voter turnout	Voter turnout %	Spoilt votes	Spoilt votes %
N01	Kuala Besut	Abdul Rahman Mokhtar (BN–UMNO)	7,123	59.4%	Nik Muhammad Zawawi Salleh (PR–PAS)	4,492	37.4%	2,631	Abdullah Che Muda (BN–UMNO)	14,180	98%				12,140	85.6%	140	1.2%
N02	Kota Putera	Muhammad Pehimi Yusof (BN–UMNO)	8,090	62.7%	Mohd Md Amin (PR–PKR)	4,758	36.9%	3,332	Wan Mohamad Wan Hassan (BN–UMNO)	15,559	98%				13,071	84.0%	166	1.3%
N03	Jertih	Idris Jusoh (BN–UMNO)	7,912	61.8%	Mohd Hassan Salleh (PR–PAS)	4,866	38.0%	3,046	Idris Jusoh (BN–UMNO)	15,449	95%	4%			12,953	83.8%	144	1.1%
N04	Hulu Besut	Nawi Mohamad (BN–UMNO)	6,740	61.1%	Mohd Zin Hassan (PR–PAS)	4,287	38.9%	2,453	Nawi Mohamad (BN–UMNO)	13,165	98%				11,174	84.9%	147	1.3%
N05	Jabi	Ramlan Ali (BN–UMNO)	6,364	53.4%	Azman Ibrahim (PR–PAS)	5,560	46.6%	804	Ramlan Ali (BN–UMNO)	14,070	99%				12,075	85.8%	151	1.3%
N06	Permaisuri	Abdul Halim Jusoh (BN–UMNO)	8,652	63.3%	Wan Rahim W Hamzah (PR–PKR)	5,013	36.7%	3,639	Mohd Jidin Shafee (BN–UMNO)	16,073	99%				13,910	86.5%	245	1.8%
N07	Langkap	Asha'ari Idris (BN–UMNO)	6,682	61.7%	Tengku Ahmad Tengku Hussain (PR–PAS)	4,131	38.2%	2,551	Asha'ari Idris (BN–UMNO)	13,066	99%				11,048	84.6%	219	2.0%
N08	Batu Rakit	Khazan Che Mat (BN–UMNO)	5,590	57.7%	Shamshudin Ab. Wahab (PR–PAS)	4,104	42.3%	1,486	Khazan Che Mat (BN–UMNO)	11,311	99%				9,811	86.7%	117	1.2%
N09	Tepuh	Muhammad Ramli Nuh (BN–UMNO)	8,455	51.2%	Abu Bakar Abdullah (PR–PAS)	8,025	48.6%	430	Muhammad Ramli Nuh (BN–UMNO)	19,850	99%				16,715	84.2%	192	1.2%
N10	Teluk Pasu	Abdul Rahin Mohd Said (BN–UMNO)	7,279	51.6%	Ridzuan Hashim (PR–PAS)	6,817	48.3%	462	Abdul Rahin Mohd Said (BN–UMNO)	16,126	98%				14,250	88.4%	141	1.0%
N11	Seberang Takir	Ahmad Razif Abdul Rahman (BN–UMNO)	6,440	61.2%	Muzafeq Affyulzaifuzan Mamat @ Muhammad (PR–PKR)	4,010	38.1%	2,430	Mohd Shapian Ali (BN–UMNO)	12,750	99%				10,718	84.1%	202	1.9%
N12	Bukit Tunggal	Alias Razak (PR–PAS)	5,483	51.5%	Tuan Arif Sahibu Fadilah Tuan Ahmad (BN–UMNO)	5,147	48.4%	336	Mohd Nasir Ibrahim Fikri (BN–UMNO)	12,488	98%				10,742	86.0%	103	1.0%
N13	Wakaf Mempelam	Mohd Abdul Wahid Endut (PR–PAS)	9,645	56.3%	Othman Awang (BN–UMNO)	7,452	43.5%	2,193	Mohd Abdul Wahid Endut (BA–PAS)	20,573	99%				17,277	84.0%	156	0.9%
N14	Bandar	Toh Chin Yaw (BN–MCA)	7,831	53.9%	Abdul Manaf Che Mat (PR–PKR)	6,689	46.0%	1,142	Toh Chin Yaw (BN–MCA)	18,953	60%	37%			14,765	77.9%	231	1.6%
N15	Ladang	Tengku Hassan Tengku Omar (PR–PAS)	6,723	50.1%	Wan Hisham (BN–UMNO)	6,692	49.9%	31	Wan Hisham Wan Salleh (BN–UMNO)	16,777	92%	7%			13,701	81.7%	285	2.1%
N16	Batu Buruk	Syed Azman Syed Ahmad Nawawi (PR–PAS)	10,672	52.8%	Nordiana Shafie (BN–UMNO)	9,511	47.1%	1,161	Wan Abdul Muttalib Embong (BA–PAS)	24,022	98%				20,428	85.0%	212	1.0%
N17	Alur Limbat	Alias Abdullah (BN–UMNO)	8,735	52.4%	Mustafa Ali (PR–PAS)	7,936	47.6%	799	Alias Abdullah (BN–UMNO)	19,694	96%	3%			16,905	85.8%	228	1.4%
N18	Bukit Payung	Mohd. Nor Hamzah (PR–PAS)	7,324	50.4%	Zaidi Muda (BN–UMNO)	7,209	49.6%	115	Abdul Latif Awang (BN–UMNO)	16,733	99%				14,664	87.6%	130	0.9%
N19	Ru Rendang	Abdul Hadi Awang (PR–PAS)	9,379	58.4%	Razali Idris (BN–UMNO)	6,693	41.6%	2,686	Abdul Hadi Awang (BA–PAS)	18,798	99%				16,209	86.2%	137	0.9%
N20	Pengkalan Berangan	Yahya Khatib Mohamad (BN–UMNO)	8,900	52.8%	Mohd Draman (PR–PAS)	7,970	47.2%	930	Yahya Khatib Mohamad (BN–UMNO)	19,588	95%	4%			17,167	87.6%	295	1.7%
N21	Telemung	Rozi Mamat (BN–UMNO)	8,619	75.3%	Engku Abu Bakar Engku Mohd (PR–PKR)	2,726	23.8%	5,893	Rozi Mamat (BN–UMNO)	13,275	99%				11,664	87.9%	212	1.8%
N22	Manir	Harun Taib (PR–PAS)	5,336	52.0%	Wan Sagar Wan Embong (BN–UMNO)	4,904	47.8%	432	Harun Taib (BA–PAS)	11,657	99%				10,356	88.8%	99	1.0%
N23	Kuala Berang	Mohd Zawawi Ismail (BN–UMNO)	6,444	56.9%	Muhyiddin Abdul Rashid (PR–PAS)	4,852	42.9%	1,592	Kamaruddin Abdul Rahman (BN–UMNO)	13,040	98%				11,476	88.0%	156	1.4%
N24	Ajil	Rosol Wahid (BN–UMNO)	8,530	69.1%	Mohd Razki Yah (PR–PAS)	5,898	30.8%	4,727	Rosol Wahid (BN–UMNO)	14,543	99%				12,531	86.2%	186	1.5%
N25	Bukit Besi	Din Adam (BN–UMNO)	6,037	62.9%	Nordin Othman (PR–PAS)	3,545	37.0%	2,492	Din Adam (BN–UMNO)	11,520	99%				9,736	84.5%	144	1.5%
N26	Rantau Abang	Za'abar Mohd Adib (BN–UMNO)	7,372	52.8%	Azman Shapawi Abdul Rani (PR–PAS)	6,582	47.1%	790	Za'abar Mohd Adib (BN–UMNO)	16,499	99%				14,192	86.0%	217	1.5%
N27	Sura	Wan Hassan Mohd Ramli (PR–PAS)	7,000	53.7%	Mohd. Rosli Harun (BN–UMNO)	6,000	46.0%	1,000	Ahmad Kamal Abdullah (BN–UMNO)	16,123	89%	9%			13,163	81.6%	128	1.0%
N28	Paka	Mohd Ariffin Abdullah (BN–UMNO)	8,806	51.0%	Satiful Bahri Mamat (PR–PAS)	8,462	49.0%	344	Mohd Ariffin Abdullah (BN–UMNO)	20,709	95%	5%			17,471	84.4%	187	1.1%
N29	Kemasik	Rosli Othman (BN–UMNO)	7,475	58.2%	Mohamad Mahadi Nawi (PR–PAS)	5,357	41.7%	2,118	Abu Bakar Ali (BN–UMNO)	15,470	94%	5%			12,969	83.8%	129	1.0%
N30	Kijal	Ahmad Said (BN–UMNO)	8,169	61.8%	Hazri Jusoh (PR–PAS)	5,012	37.9%	3,157	Ahmad Said (BN–UMNO)	15,568	97%	2%			13,386	86.0%	176	1.3%
N31	Chukai	Mohamed Awang Tera (BN–UMNO)	9,541	52.0%	Hanafiah Mat (PR–PAS)	8,772	47.8%	769	Mohamed Awang Tera (BN–UMNO)	22,877	83%	15%			18,530	81.0%	193	1.0%
N32	Air Putih	Wan Abdul Hakim Wan Mokhtar (BN–UMNO)	10,771	60.7%	Ismail Harun (PR–PAS)	6,950	39.2%	3,821	Wan Ahmad Nizam Wan Abdul Hamid (BN–UMNO)	21,091	95%	3%			17,985	85.3%	248	1.4%

== Penang ==
#	Constituency	Winner	Votes	Votes %	Opponent(s)	Votes	Votes %	Majority	Incumbent	Eligible voters	Malay voters	Chinese voters	Indian voters	Others voters	Voter turnout	Voter turnout %	Spoilt votes	Spoilt votes %															
N01	Penaga	Azhar Ibrahim (BN–UMNO)	6,685	55.1%	Tapiudin Hamzah (PR–PAS)	5,454	44.9%	1,231	Azhar Ibrahim (BN–UMNO)	14,268	89%	10%			12,314	86.3%	170	1.4%															
N02	Bertam	Zabariah Abdul Wahab (BN–UMNO)	6,794	61.9%	Noorsiah Md. Arshad (PR–PKR)	4,142	37.8%	2,652	Hilmi Abdul Rashid (BN–UMNO)	13,660	65%	26%	10%		11,233	82.2%	261	2.3%															
N03	Pinang Tunggal	Roslan Saidin (BN–UMNO)	7,848	63.0%	Mahamad Hashim (PR–PKR)	4,613	37.0%	3,235	Roslan Saidin (BN–UMNO)	15,091	70%	25%	4%		12,782	84.7%	318	2.5%															
N04	Permatang Berangan	Shabudin Yahaya (BN–UMNO)	7,295	57.8%	Arshad Md. Salleh (PR–PAS)	5,310	42.1%	1,985	Shabudin Yahaya (BN–UMNO)	15,174	80%	9%	10%		12,806	84.4%	193	1.5%															
N05	Sungai Dua	Jasmin Mohamed (BN–UMNO)	6,421	52.1%	Mohd Salleh Man (PR–PAS)	5,886	47.8%	535	Jasmin Mohamed (BN–UMNO)	14,721	84%	13%	2%		12,485	84.8%	164	1.3%															
N06	Telok Ayer Tawar	Jahara Hamid (BN–UMNO)	6,478	56.3%	Norhayati Jaafar (PR–PKR)	5,008	43.5%	1,470	Jahara Hamid (BN–UMNO)	12,509	65%	23%	11%		11,705	93.6%	199	1.7%															
N07	Sungai Puyu	Phee Boon Poh (PR–DAP)	13,025	77.3%	Tay Lay Cheng (BN–MCA)	3,824	22.7%	9,201	Phee Boon Poh (DAP)	20,708	5%	88%	7%		17,061	82.4%	210	1.2%															
N08	Bagan Jermal	Lim Hock Seng (PR–DAP)	11,099	68.0%	Ooi Chuan Aik (BN–MCA)	5,226	32.0%	5,873	Ooi Chuan Aik (BN–MCA)	21,483	18%	67%	13%		16,579	77.2%	247	1.5%															
N09	Bagan Dalam	Tanasekharan Autherapady (PR–DAP)	7,601	62.6%	Subbaiyah Palaniappan (BN–MIC)	4,669	37.4%	2,932	Subbaiyah Palaniappan (BN–MIC)	17,194	24%	53%	22%		12,420	72.2%	274	2.2%															
N10	Seberang Jaya	Arif Shah Omar Shah (BN–UMNO)	9,395	51.4%	Ramli Bulat (PR–PKR)	8,862	48.5%	533	Arif Shah Omar Shah (BN–UMNO)	22,171	63%	24%	12%		18,493	83.4%	222	1.2%															
N11	Permatang Pasir	Mohd Hamdan Abd Rahman (PR–PAS)	11,004	66.4%	Ahmad Sahar Shuib (BN–UMNO)	5,571	33.6%	5,433	Mohd Hamdan Abd Rahman (BA–PAS)	20,350	72%	26%			16,803	82.6%	227	1.4%															
N12	Penanti	Mohammad Fairus Khairuddin (PR–PKR)	5,127	41.1%	Abdul Jalil Abdul Majid (BN–UMNO)	7,346	58.9%	2,219	Abdul Jalil Abdul Majid (BN–UMNO)	15,421	73%	24%	2%		12,667	82.1%	184	1.5%															
N13	Berapit	Ong Kok Fooi (PR–DAP)	10,006	65.3%	Lau Chiek Tuan (BN–MCA)	5,314	34.7%	4,692	Lau Chiek Tuan (BN–MCA)	19,895	6%	86%	19%		15,530	78.1%	197	1.3%															
N14	Machang Bubok	Tan Hock Leong (PR–PKR)	11,002	61.4%	Lee Kah Choon (BN–GERAKAN)	6,922	38.6%	4,080	Toh Kin Woon (BN–GERAKAN)	22,424	39%	52%	9%		18,279	81.5%	349	1.9%															
N15	Padang Lalang	Tan Cheong Heng (PR–DAP)	10,520	62.6%	Tan Teik Cheng (BN–MCA)	6,279	37.4%	4,241	Tan Teik Cheng (BN–MCA)	21,761	9%	84%	6%		17,009	78.2%	206	1.2%															
N16	Perai	Ramasamy Palanisamy (PR–DAP)	7,668	73.2%	Krishnan Letchumanan (BN–MIC)	2,492	23.8%	5,176	Rajapathy Kuppusamy (BN–MIC)	14,124	12%	52%	36%		10,651	75.4%	180	1.7%															
N16	Perai	Ramasamy Palanisamy (PR–DAP)	7,668	73.2%	Ulaganathan K.A.P. Ramasamy (IND)	311	3.0%	5,176	Rajapathy Kuppusamy (BN–MIC)	14,124	12%	52%	36%		10,651	75.4%	180	1.7%															
N17	Bukit Tengah	Ong Chin Wen (PR–PKR)	6,736	58.2%	Ng Siew Lai (BN–GERAKAN)	4,832	41.7%	1,904	Ng Siew Lai (BN–GERAKAN)	14,995	38%	44%	18%		11,835	78.9%	257	2.2%															
N18	Bukit Tambun	Law Choo Kiang (PR–PKR)	9,855	67.5%	Huan Cheng Guan (BN–GERAKAN)	4,726	32.4%	5,129	Lai Chew Hock (BN–GERAKAN)	18,208	14%	70%	16%		14,826	81.4%	235	1.6%															
N19	Jawi	Tan Beng Huat (PR–DAP)	9,739	62.1%	Tan Cheng Liang (BN–MCA)	5,949	37.9%	3,790	Tan Cheng Liang (BN–MCA)	20,167	22%	58%	20%		16,101	79.8%	413	2.6%															
N20	Sungai Bakap	Maktar Shapee (PR–PKR)	6,976	58.7%	Abd Rashid Abdullah (BN–UMNO)	4,909	41.3%	2,067	Abd Rashid Abdullah (BN–UMNO)	15,026	58%	24%	7%		12,087	80.4%	200	1.7%															
N21	Sungai Acheh	Mahmud Zakaria (BN–UMNO)	5,011	51.3%	Azhar Ahamad (PR–PKR)	4,761	48.7%	250	Mohd Foad Mat Isa (BN–UMNO)	12,347	69%	24%	7%		9,939	80.5%	162	1.6%															
N22	Tanjong Bunga	Teh Yee Cheu (PR–DAP)	7,021	57.8%	Chia Loong Thye (BN–GERAKAN)	5,086	41.9%	1,935	Koh Tsu Koon (BN–GERAKAN)	16,910	27%	63%	11%		12,359	73.1%	220	1.8%															
N23	Air Puteh	Lim Guan Eng (PR–DAP)	6,601	72.1%	Tan Yok Cheng (BN–MCA)	2,540	27.7%	4,061	Lye Siew Weng (BN–MCA)	12,454	10%	83%	7%		9,288	74.6%	130	1.4%															
N24	Kebun Bunga	Jason Ong Khan Lee (PR–PKR)	8,307	61.6%	Quah Kooi Heong (BN–GERAKAN)	5,182	38.4%	3,125	Quah Kooi Heong (BN–GERAKAN)	18,458	9%	78%	14%		13,721	74.3%	231	1.7%															
N25	Pulau Tikus	Koay Teng Hai (PR–DAP)	6,649	57.3%	Teng Hock Nan (BN–GERAKAN)	4,935	42.6%	1,714	Teng Hock Nan (BN–GERAKAN)	16,723	14%	79%	7%		11,766	70.4%	168	1.4%															
N26	Padang Kota	Chow Kon Yeow (PR–DAP)	6,449	57.1%	Teng Chang Yeow (BN–GERAKAN)	4,788	42.4%	1,661	Teng Chang Yeow (BN–GERAKAN)	16,704	13%	79%	9%		11,507	68.9%	220	1.9%															
N27	Pengkalan Kota	Lau Keng Ee (PR–DAP)	10,185	68.4%	Lee Hack Teik (BN–MCA)	4,708	31.6%	5,477	Lee Hack Teik (BN–MCA)	19,508		95%	4%		15,090	77.4%	195	1.3%															
N28	Komtar	Ng Wei Aik (PR–DAP)	7,610	63.8%	Lim Gim Soon (BN–MCA)	4,282	35.9%	3,328	Lim Gim Soon (BN–MCA)	16,976	11%	83%	6%		12,135	71.5%	203	1.7%															
N29	Datok Keramat	Jagdeep Singh Deo (PR–DAP)	7,995	56.6%	Ong Thean Lye (BN–GERAKAN)	6,140	43.4%	1,855	Ong Thean Lye (BN–GERAKAN)	18,852	34%	58%	10%		14,444	76.6%	308	2.1%															
N29	Datok Keramat	Jagdeep Singh Deo (PR–DAP)	7,995	56.6%	N30	Sungai Pinang	Koid Teng Guan (PR–DAP)	1,855	Ong Thean Lye (BN–GERAKAN)	18,852	34%	58%	10%		14,444	76.6%	308	2.1%	8,305	57.8%	Looi Swee Cheang (BN–GERAKAN)	5,611	39.1%	2,694	Looi Swee Cheang (BN–GERAKAN)	19,368	33%	58%	9%	14,604	75.4%	235	1.6%
Badrul Zaman P.S. Md Zakariah (IND)	449	3.1%			N30	Sungai Pinang	Koid Teng Guan (PR–DAP)												8,305	57.8%				2,694	Looi Swee Cheang (BN–GERAKAN)	19,368	33%	58%	9%	14,604	75.4%	235	1.6%
N31	Batu Lancang	Danny Law Heng Kiang (PR–DAP)	11,945	69.7%	Ng Fook On (BN–GERAKAN)	5,200	30.3%	6,745	Ng Fook On (BN–GERAKAN)	22,166	8%	88%	5%		17,319	78.1%	171	1.0%															
N32	Seri Delima	RSN Rayer (PR–DAP)	8,402	57.2%	Loh Nam Hooi (BN–MCA)	6,274	42.7%	2,128	Koay Kar Huah (BN–MCA)	20,510	25%	65%	10%		14,915	72.7%	217	1.5%															
N33	Air Itam	Wong Hon Wai (PR–DAP)	7,401	61.3%	Cheang Chee Gooi (BN–GERAKAN)	4,674	38.7%	2,727	Cheang Chee Gooi (BN–GERAKAN)	16,721	23%	71%	6%		12,260	73.3%	182	1.5%															
N34	Paya Terubong	Yeoh Soon Hin (PR–DAP)	16,848	74.6%	Koh Wan Leong (BN–MCA)	5,727	25.4%	11,121	Loh Hock Hun (BN–MCA)	28,383	7%	85%	8%		22,832	80.4%	250	1.1%															
N35	Batu Uban	Raveentharan V. Subramaniam (PR–PKR)	8,046	50.5%	Goh Kheng Sneah (BN–GERAKAN)	7,435	46.7%	611	Goh Kheng Sneah (BN–GERAKAN)	21,483	29%	59%	12%		16,214	75.5%	285	1.8%															
N36	Pantai Jerejak	Sim Tze Tzin (PR–PKR)	6,982	55.0%	Wong Mun Hoe (BN-GERAKAN)	5,724	45.1%	1,258	Wong Mun Hoe (BN-GERAKAN)	17,445	43%	48%	9%		12,898	73.9%	192	1.5%															
N37	Batu Maung	Abdul Malik Abul Kassim (PR–PKR)	9,571	56.4%	Norman Zahalan (BN–UMNO)	6,402	37.7%	3,169	Mansor Musa (BN–UMNO)	21,785	53%	40%	7%		17,253	79.2%	267	1.6%															
N38	Bayan Lepas	Syed Amerruddin Syed Ahmad (BN–UMNO)	6,563	51.5%	Asnah Hashim (PR–PAS)	6,164	48.4%	399	Syed Amerruddin Syed Ahmad (BN–UMNO)	16,229	62%	34%	5%		12,971	79.9%	233	1.8%															
N39	Pulau Betong	Muhammad Farid Saad (BN–UMNO)	4,990	51.5%	Mansor Othman (PR–PKR)	4,696	48.5%	294	Muhammad Farid Saad (BN–UMNO)	12,170	60%	37%	3%		9,847	80.9%	160	1.6%															
N40	Telok Bahang	Hilmi Yahaya (BN–UMNO)	4,434	52.7%	Abdul Halim Hussain (PR–PKR)	3,969	47.2%	465	Siti Faridah Arshad (BN–UMNO)	10,866	62%	36%	2%		8,565	78.8%	152	1.8%															

== Perak ==
#	Constituency	Winner	Votes	Votes %	Opponent(s)	Votes	Votes %	Majority	Incumbent	Eligible voters	Malay voters	Chinese voters	Indian voters	Others voters	Voter turnout	Voter turnout %	Spoilt votes	Spoilt votes %
N01	Pengkalan Hulu	Tajol Rosli Mohd Ghazali (BN–UMNO)	6,769	76.1%	Lee Sing Long (PR–PKR)	2,124	23.9%	4,645	Tajol Rosli Mohd Ghazali (BN–UMNO)	11,783	73%	12%		9%	9,254	78.5%	361	3.9%
N02	Temenggor	Hasbullah Osman (BN–UMNO)	7,578	71.9%	Moon Akau (PR–PKR)	2,961	28.1%	4,617	Hasbullah Osman (BN–UMNO)	14,446	72%	23%		2%	10,910	75.5%	371	3.4%
N03	Kenering	Mohd Tarmizi Idris (BN–UMNO)	6,134	64.6%	Mohd Sukri Ahmad (PR–PAS)	3,336	35.1%	2,798	Mohd Tarmizi Idris (BN–UMNO)	12,609	84%	15%			9,675	76.7%	176	1.8%
N04	Kota Tampan	Saarani Mohamad (BN–UMNO)	4,963	65.1%	Hamzah Mohd Zain (PR–PKR)	2,628	34.5%	2,335	Saarani Mohamad (BN–UMNO)	10,614	78%	19%			7,761	73.1%	141	1.8%
N05	Selama	Mohamad Daud Mohd Yusoff (BN–UMNO)	5,240	51.7%	Abu Husin Mohammad (PR–PAS)	4,885	48.2%	355	Mohamad Daud Mohd Yusoff (BN–UMNO)	13,279	83%	10%	6%		10,346	77.9%	201	1.9%
N06	Kubu Gajah	Raja Ahmad Zainuddin Raja Omar (BN–UMNO)	4,114	50.3%	Mohd Nazri Din (PR–PAS)	4,048	49.5%	66	Jefri Mohd Yunus (BN–UMNO)	10,985	91%	3%	5%		8,349	76.0%	174	2.1%
N07	Batu Kurau	Mohd Najmuddin Elias (BN–UMNO)	7,023	60.5%	Abdul Hamid Ali (PR–PKR)	4,584	39.5%	2,439	Mohd Najmuddin Elias (BN–UMNO)	15,433	88%	5%	7%		11,902	77.1%	295	2.5%
N08	Titi Serong	Khalil Idham Lim Abdullah (PR–PAS)	10,012	52.9%	Abu Bakar Mat Ali (BN–UMNO)	8,863	46.8%	1,149	Abu Bakar Mat Ali (BN–UMNO)	24,210	75%	18%	8%		19,202	79.3%	276	1.4%
N09	Kuala Kurau	Abdul Yunus Jamhari (PR–PKR)	8,224	51.5%	Mohd Salleh Mat Disa (BN–UMNO)	7,757	48.5%	467	Mohd Salleh Mat Disa (BN–UMNO)	21,009	58%	40%	2%		16,360	77.9%	378	2.3%
N10	Alor Pongsu	Sham Mat Sahat (BN–UMNO)	5,585	50.4%	Md Nasib Rahin (PR–PKR)	5,490	49.5%	95	Sham Mat Sahat (BN–UMNO)	15,144	70%	13%	17%		11,481	75.8%	391	3.4%
N11	Gunong Semanggol	Ramli Tusin (PR–PAS)	6,959	57.3%	Abd Muhaimin Abd Rahman Nazri (BN–UMNO)	4,889	40.2%	2,070	Abd Muhaimin Abd Rahman Nazri (BN–UMNO)	15,763	80%	15%	5%		12,440	78.9%	285	2.3%
N12	Selinsing	Husin Din (PR–PAS)	6,149	51.2%	Zaili Cha (BN–UMNO)	5,602	46.6%	547	Zaili Cha (BN–UMNO)	16,204	71%	19%	10%		12,314	76.0%	301	2.4%
N13	Kuala Sapetang	Tai Sing Ng (PR–PKR)	7,285	51.9%	See Tean Seng (BN–GERAKAN)	6,721	47.9%	564	See Tean Seng (BN–GERAKAN)	19,699	60%	32%	8%		14,496	73.6%	460	3.2%
N14	Changkat Jering	Mohd Osman Mohd Jailu (PR–PKR)	9,411	52.9%	Mat Isa Ismail (BN–UMNO)	8,309	46.7%	1,102	Mat Isa Ismail (BN–UMNO)	24,864	64%	26%	10%		18,114	72.9%	334	1.8%
N15	Trong	Rosli Husin (BN–UMNO)	4,212	56.0%	Norazli Musa (PR–PAS)	3,296	43.9%	916	Rosli Husin (BN–UMNO)	10,908	70%	20%	10%		7,690	70.5%	173	2.3%
N16	Kamunting	Mohamad Zahir Abdul Khalid (BN–UMNO)	7,975	50.4%	Muhamad Apardi Sharri (PR–PAS)	7,420	46.9%	555	Abdul Malek Mohamed Hanafiah (BN–UMNO)	21,675	66%	19%	13%		16,179	74.6%	358	2.2%
N17	Pokok Assam	Yee Seu Kai (PR–DAP)	7,574	52.9%	Ho Cheng Wang (BN–MCA)	6,709	46.9%	865	Ho Cheng Wang (BN–MCA)	20,711	14%	75%	10%		14,538	70.2%	228	1.6%
N18	Aulong	Yew Tian Hoe (PR–DAP)	9,360	58.4%	Ong Teng Boon (BN–GERAKAN)	6,552	40.9%	2,808	Ng Chii Fa (BN–GERAKAN)	23,503	25%	58%	17%		16,406	69.8%	371	2.3%
N19	Chenderoh	Siti Salmah Mat Jusak (BN–UMNO)	4,858	55.7%	Mohammad Yassin Mohamed Yusof (PR–PAS)	3,819	43.8%	1,039	Siti Salmah Mat Jusak (BN–UMNO)	11,848	77%	17%	7%		8,905	75.2%	188	2.1%
N20	Lubok Merbau	Mohd Zainudin Mohd Yusof (PR–PAS)	4,664	50.2%	Jamal Nasir Rasdi (BN–UMNO)	4,592	49.4%	72	Jamal Nasir Rasdi (BN–UMNO)	12,549	71%	21%	8%		9,444	75.3%	150	1.6%
N21	Lintang	Ahamad Pakeh Adam (BN–UMNO)	8,066	54.7%	Mohamad Aun Yob Abas (PR–PKR)	6,690	45.3%	1,376	Ahamad Pakeh Adam (BN–UMNO)	21,767	61%	21%	18%		15,143	69.6%	387	2.6%
N22	Jalong	Leong Mee Meng (PR–DAP)	11,560	65.6%	Cheah Chee Kuan (BN–GERAKAN)	6,065	34.4%	5,495	Chang Ko Youn (BN–GERAKAN)	25,657	16%	57%	27%		18,008	70.2%	383	2.1%
N23	Manjoi	Nadzri Ismail (BN–UMNO)	14,804	50.5%	Zulkurnaini Ibrahim (PR–PAS)	14,456	49.3%	348	Nadzri Ismail (BN–UMNO)	39,640	66%	25%	9%		29,814	75.2%	473	1.6%
N24	Hulu Kinta	Rusnah Kassim (BN–UMNO)	13,057	60.8%	Ayyathurai Achutharaman (PR–PKR)	7,825	36.4%	5,232	Mazidah Zakaria (BN–UMNO)	29,326	62%	23%	14%		22,122	75.4%	629	2.8%
N24	Hulu Kinta	Rusnah Kassim (BN–UMNO)	13,057	60.8%	Sathiya Seelan Munisamy (IND)	360	1.7%	5,232	Mazidah Zakaria (BN–UMNO)	29,326	62%	23%	14%		22,122	75.4%	629	2.8%
N25	Canning	Wong Kah Woh (PR–DAP)	13,923	61.7%	Vincent Hooi Wy Hon (BN–GERAKAN)	8,257	36.6%	5,666	Vincent Hooi Wy Hon (BN–GERAKAN)	31,990	13%	78%	8%		22,854	71.4%	303	1.3%
N26	Tebing Tinggi	Ong Boon Piow (PR–DAP)	7,197	60.3%	Chew Wai Khoon (BN–MCA)	4,682	39.2%	2,515	Chew Wai Khoon (BN–MCA)	18,074	17%	77%	5%		12,112	67.0%	175	1.4%
N27	Pasir Pinji	Thomas Su Keong Siong (PR–DAP)	12,526	66.6%	Khoo Boon Chuan (BN–MCA)	6,187	32.9%	6,339	Su Keong Siong (DAP)	26,583	9%	89%	2%		19,047	71.7%	250	1.3%
N28	Bercham	Sum Cheok Leng (PR–DAP)	12,848	65.2%	Gooi Seng Teik (BN–MCA)	6,838	34.7%	6,010	Gooi Seng Teik (BN–MCA)	26,587	11%	80%	9%		19,966	75.1%	249	1.3%
N29	Kepayang	Loke Chee Yan (PR–DAP)	7,552	51.1%	Tan Chin Meng (BN–MCA)	7,062	47.8%	490	Tan Chin Meng (BN–MCA)	21,256	23%	64%	13%		15,072	70.9%	304	2.0%
N30	Buntong	Sivasubramaniam Athinarayanan (PR–DAP)	10,311	67.4%	Lee Tung Lai (BN–MCA)	4,996	32.6%	5,315	Yik Phooi Hong (BN–MCA)	21,930	6%	47%	46%		15,566	71.0%	258	1.7%
N31	Jelapang	Hee Yit Foong (PR–DAP)	12,219	64.3%	Loh Koi Pin (BN–MCA)	5,512	29.0%	6,707	Hee Yit Foong (DAP)	26,157	6%	74%	20%		19,409	74.2%	402	2.1%
N31	Jelapang	Hee Yit Foong (PR–DAP)	12,219	64.3%	Sarasvathy Muthu (IND)	1,275	6.7%	6,707	Hee Yit Foong (DAP)	26,157	6%	74%	20%		19,409	74.2%	402	2.1%
N32	Menglembu	Lim Pek Har (PR–DAP)	13,305	66.2%	Loo Gar Yen (BN–MCA)	6,782	33.8%	6,523	Keong Meng Sing (DAP)	27,053	4%	93%	4%		20,330	75.2%	243	1.2%
N33	Tronoh	Sivakumar Varatharaju Naidu (PR–DAP)	9,302	57.8%	Lee Kim Choy (BN–MCA)	6,731	41.8%	2,571	Lee Koh Yin (BN–MCA)	24,103	21%	67%	12%		16,446	68.2%	340	2.1%
N34	Bukit Chandan	Wan Mohammad Khair-il Anuar Wan Ahmad (BN–UMNO)	5,850	56.6%	Zulkifily Ibrahim (PR–PKR)	4,156	40.2%	1,694	Ahmad Jaafar (BN–UMNO)	14,211	65%	26%	8%		10,518	74.0%	178	1.7%
N35	Manong	Ramly Zahari (BN–UMNO)	5,391	53.4%	Mohamad Yazid Yeop Baharuddin (PR–PAS)	4,642	46.0%	749	Ramly Zahari (BN–UMNO)	14,114	67%	26%	6%		10,256	72.7%	160	1.6%
N36	Pengkalan Baharu	Hamdi Abu Bakar (BN–UMNO)	5,375	49.9%	Abu Bakar Hussain (PR–PAS)	5,361	49.8%	14	Hamdi Abu Bakar (BN–UMNO)	15,262	64%	25%	11%		11,108	72.8%	334	3.0%
N37	Pantai Remis	Nga Kor Ming (PR–DAP)	12,188	63.0%	Ooi Jing Ting (BN–MCA)	7,112	36.7%	5,076	Nga Kor Ming (DAP)	28,011	13%	71%	15%		19,712	70.4%	354	1.8%
N38	Belanja	Mohamad Zaim Abu Hassan (BN–UMNO)	5,479	59.9%	Muhammad Ismi Mat Talib (PR–PAS)	3,592	39.3%	1,887	Mohd Zaim Abu Hasan (BN–UMNO)	14,470	87%	6%	6%		9,313	64.4%	172	1.9%
N39	Bota	Nasarudin Hashim (BN–UMNO)	6,556	59.2%	Usaili Alias (PR–PKR)	4,488	40.5%	2,068	Che Ri Md Daud (BN–UMNO)	14,389	99%				11,338	78.8%	257	2.3%
N40	Malim Nawar	Keshvinder Singh Kashmir Singh (PR–DAP)	7,801	54.6%	Chai Song Poh (BN–MCA)	6,439	45.1%	1,362	Lee Chee Leong (BN–MCA)	23,276	17%	73%	8%		14,647	62.9%	364	2.5%
N41	Keranji	Chen Fook Chye (PR–DAP)	8,459	67.5%	Chong Mun Wah (BN–MCA)	4,024	32.1%	4,435	Chen Fook Chye (DAP)	19,857	12%	79%	9%		12,738	64.2%	212	1.7%
N42	Tualang Sekah	Nolee Ashilin Mohamed Radzi (BN–UMNO)	6,366	56.8%	Nadarajah Manikam (PR–PKR)	4,797	42.8%	1,569	Mohd Radzi Manan (BN–UMNO)	16,651	57%	30%	13%		11,578	69.5%	361	3.1%
N43	Sungai Rapat	Hamidah Osman (BN–UMNO)	10,635	51.5%	Radzi Zainon (PR–PAS)	9,999	48.5%	636	Hamidah Osman (BN–UMNO)	28,830	63%	28%	10%		21,040	73.0%	406	1.9%
N44	Simpang Pulai	Chan Ming Kai (PR–PKR)	10,992	59.1%	Chan Chin Chee (BN–MCA)	7,606	40.9%	3,386	Chan Chin Chee (BN–MCA)	26,159	29%	64%	7%		18,887	72.2%	289	1.5%
N45	Teja	Chang Lih Kang (PR–PKR)	6,533	50.7%	Yew Sau Kham (BN–MCA)	6,358	49.3%	175	Ho Wai Cheong (BN–MCA)	19,355	34%	56%	10%		13,258	68.5%	367	2.8%
N46	Chenderiang	Mah Hang Soon (BN–MCA)	7,451	64.7%	Arjunan Muthu (PR–PKR)	4,059	35.3%	3,392	Chang Kon You (BN–MCA)	18,004	38%	36%		13%	12,055	67.0%	544	4.5%
N47	Ayer Kuning	Samsudin Abu Hassan (BN–UMNO)	8,628	61.6%	Ahmad Razi Othman (PR–PAS)	5,376	38.4%	3,252	Samsudin Abu Hassan (BN–UMNO)	20,232	55%	28%	14%		14,481	71.6%	477	3.3%
N48	Sungai Manik	Zainol Fadzi Paharudin (BN–UMNO)	8,255	54.5%	Mustaffa Kamil Ayub (PR–PKR)	6,881	45.5%	1,374	Ibrahim Katop (BN–UMNO)	20,990	65%	29%		2%	15,492	73.8%	356	2.3%
N49	Kampong Gajah	Wan Norashikin Wan Noordin (BN–UMNO)	8,818	54.4%	Mustafa Shaari (PR–PAS)	7,402	45.6%	1,416	Tajuddin Abdul Rahman (BN–UMNO)	21,722	93%		4%		16,624	76.5%	401	2.4%
N50	Sitiawan	Ngeh Koo Ham (PR–DAP)	12,381	76.0%	Ding Siew Chee (BN–MCA)	3,852	23.7%	8,529	Ngeh Khoo Ham (DAP)	23,632	9%	81%	10%		16,645	70.4%	363	2.2%
N51	Pasir Panjang	Mohammad Nizar Jamaluddin (PR–PAS)	11,994	60.6%	Vasan P. Sinnadurai (BN–MIC)	7,520	38.0%	4,474	Ramachandran Mookiah (BN–MIC)	26,557	66%	15%	19%		20,188	76.0%	409	2.0%
N52	Pangkor	Zambry Abdul Kadir (BN–UMNO)	10,906	61.4%	Pakhrazi Musa (PR–PKR)	5,121	28.8%	5,785	Zambry Abdul Kadir (BN–UMNO)	22,574	71%	23%	4%		19,097	84.6%	1,340	7.0%
N53	Rungkup	Sha'arani Mohamad (BN–UMNO)	4,984	52.2%	Mohd Misbahul Munir Masduki (PR–PAS)	4,530	47.5%	454	Sha'arani Mohamad (BN–UMNO)	13,912	67%	23%	10%		9,858	70.9%	314	3.2%
N54	Hutan Melintang	Kesavan Subramaniam (PR–PKR)	7,804	56.1%	Thangasvari Suppiah (BN–MIC)	6,083	43.7%	1,721	Rajoo Govindasamy (BN–MIC)	20,758	51%	17%	32%		14,556	70.1%	636	4.4%
N55	Pasir Bedamar	Seah Leong Peng (PR–DAP)	13,655	70.3%	Lee Heng (BN–PPP)	5,741	29.5%	7,914	Seah Leong Peng (DAP)	28,745	16%	70%	14%		19,777	68.8%	338	1.7%
N56	Changkat Jong	Mohd Anuar Sudin (PR–PAS)	8,705	52.6%	Idris Hashim (BN–UMNO)	7,806	47.2%	899	Onn Hamzah (BN–UMNO)	23,609	61%	13%	26%		16,962	71.9%	410	2.4%
N57	Sungkai	Sivanesan Achalingam (PR–DAP)	6,323	56.3%	Veerasingam Suppiah (BN–MIC)	4,869'	43.3%	1,454	Ganesan Retanam (BN–MIC)	17,290	23%	57%	19%		11,719	67.8%	485	4.1%
N58	Slim	Mohd. Khusairi Abdul Talib (BN–UMNO)	8,233	63.4%	Zulqarnain Hassan (PR–PAS)	4,707	36.3%	3,526	Mohd Khusairi Abdul Talib (BN–UMNO)	17,639	73%	13%	13%		13,321	75.5%	335	2.5%
N59	Behrang	Jamaluddin Mohd Radzi (PR–PKR)	6,771	53.9%	Ramasamy Muthusamy (BN–MIC)	5,744	45.8%	1,027	Appalannaidu Rajoo (BN–MIC)	18,552	57%	24%	14%		13,067	70.4%	512	3.9%

== Pahang ==
#	Constituency	Winner	Votes	Votes %	Opponent(s)	Votes	Votes %	Majority	Incumbent	Eligible voters	Malay voters	Chinese voters	Indian voters	Others voters	Voter turnout	Voter turnout %	Spoilt votes	Spoilt votes %
N01	Tanah Rata	Ho Yip Kap (IND)	3,926	41.9%	Chai Kok Lim (BN–MCA)	3,351	35.8%	575	Choong Ching Yan (BN–MCA)	14,569	19%	54%	22%		9,782	67.1%	409	4.2%
N01	Tanah Rata	Ho Yip Kap (IND)	3,926	41.9%	Go Mong Nging (PR–DAP)	2,043	21.8%	575	Choong Ching Yan (BN–MCA)	14,569	19%	54%	22%		9,782	67.1%	409	4.2%
N02	Jelai	Wan Rosdy Wan Ismail (BN–UMNO)	4,482	70.6%	Abdullah Abdul Wahab (PR–PKR)	1,861	29.3%	2,621	Wan Rosdy Wan Ismail (BN–UMNO)	8,892	82%			16%	6,674	75.1%	323	4.8%
N03	Padang Tengku	Abdul Rahman Mohamad (BN–UMNO)	4,653	57.2%	Roslan Zainal (PR–PAS)	3,465	42.6%	1,188	Abdul Rahman Mohamad (BN–UMNO)	10,282	92%	4%	4%		8,298	80.7%	160	1.9%
N04	Cheka	Fong Koong Fuee (BN–MCA)	4,391	58.1%	Ishak Sat (PR–PKR)	3,111	41.2%	1,280	Fong Koong Fuee (BN–MCA)	10,544	68%	26%	5%		7,812	74.1%	260	3.3%
N05	Benta	Mohd. Soffi Abd. Razak (BN–UMNO)	3,437	62.1%	Zakaria Abdul Hamid (PR–PKR)	2,079	37.5%	1,358	Mohd Soffi Abd Razak (BN–UMNO)	7,599	59%	30%	11%		5,648	74.3%	109	1.9%
N06	Batu Talam	Abd. Aziz Mat Kiram (BN–UMNO)	5,632	63.4%	Abdullah Suhaimin Sa'at (PR–PAS)	3,217	36.2%	2,415	Tengku Paris Tengku Razlan (BN–UMNO)	11,501	82%	11%	5%		9,086	79.0%	202	2.2%
N07	Tras	Choong Siew Onn (PR–DAP)	8,270	58.4%	Chan Choon Fah (BN–MCA)	5,819	41.1%	2,451	Chan Choon Fah (BN–MCA)	20,419	21%	68%	10%		14,416	70.6%	260	1.8%
N08	Dong	Shahiruddin Ab Moin (BN–UMNO)	6,804	64.0%	Kamaludin Abd Rahman (PR–PKR)	3,413	32.1%	3,391	Shahiruddin Ab Moin (BN–UMNO)	14,534	62%	35%	3%		10,956	75.4%	319	2.9%
N08	Dong	Shahiruddin Ab Moin (BN–UMNO)	6,804	64.0%	Tengku Yusop Tengku Abdul Hamid (IND)	387	3.6%	3,391	Shahiruddin Ab Moin (BN–UMNO)	14,534	62%	35%	3%		10,956	75.4%	319	2.9%
N09	Tahan	Wan Amizan Wan Abdul Razak (BN–UMNO)	5,112	57.5%	Nuridah Mohd Salleh (PR–PAS)	3,755	42.3%	1,357	Ahmad Jaafar (BN–UMNO)	11,326	97%				9,073	80.1%	189	2.1%
N10	Damak	Lau Lee (BN–MCA)	5,674	40.0%	Mohd Nor Jaafar (PR–PKR)	5,165	36.4%	509	Lau Lee (BN–MCA)	19,412	56%	37%	6%		14,597	75.2%	408	2.8%
N10	Damak	Lau Lee (BN–MCA)	5,674	40.0%	Koh Boon Heng (IND)	3,295	23.2%	509	Lau Lee (BN–MCA)	19,412	56%	37%	6%		14,597	75.2%	408	2.8%
N11	Pulau Tawar	Ahmad Shukri Ismail (BN–UMNO)	8,720	61.5%	Ishak A. Ghani (PR–PAS)	5,426	38.3%	3,294	Ahmad Shukri Ismail (BN–UMNO)	18,074	99%				14,396	79.7%	212	1.5%
N12	Beserah	Syed Mohammed Tuan Lonnik (PR–PAS)	10,728	53.4%	Fisar Abdullah (BN–UMNO)	9,187	45.7%	1,541	Fisar Abdullah (BN–UMNO)	25,808	73%	24%	3%		20,423	79.1%	316	1.6%
N13	Semambu	Pang Tsu Ming (BN–MCA)	10,300	55.3%	Nancy Khong Saw Gek (PR–PKR)	8,164	43.8%	2,136	Pang Tsu Ming (BN–MCA)	25,427	58%	33%	9%		19,255	75.7%	624	3.2%
N14	Teruntum	Chang Hong Seong (BN–MCA)	8,015	50.5%	Siew Fook Chan (PR–PKR)	7,722	48.6%	293	Ti Lian Ker (BN–MCA)	22,742	38%	57%	5%		16,256	71.5%	381	2.3%
N15	Tanjung Lumpur	Wan Adnan Wan Mamat (BN–UMNO)	6,478	51.9%	Rosli Abdul Jabar (PR–PAS)	5,982	47.9%	496	Nasharuddin Zainudin (BN–UMNO)	16,453	74%	22%	4%		12,696	77.2%	203	1.6%
N16	Inderapura	Shafik Fauzan Sharif (BN–UMNO)	3,791	56.4%	Syed Abdul Rahman Syed Hussain (PR–PAS)	2,918	43.4%	873	Shafik Fauzan Sharif (BN–UMNO)	8,550	94%	6%			6,820	79.8%	97	1.4%
N17	Sungai Lembing	Md Sohaimi Mohamed Shah (BN–UMNO)	5,913	64.5%	Ishak Ahmad (PR–PAS)	3,244	35.4%	2,669	Md Sohaimi Mohamed Shah (BN–UMNO)	12,172	82%	17%			9,348	76.8%	176	1.9%
N18	Lepar	Mohd Shohaimi Jusoh (BN–UMNO)	6,543	73.2%	Khazizi Ahmad (PR–PKR)	2,380	26.6%	4,163	Ahmad Tajuddin Sulaiman (BN–UMNO)	11,877	74%	23%	3%		9,076	76.4%	142	1.6%
N19	Panching	Mohd Zaili Besar (BN–UMNO)	6,844	55.8%	Yusof Embong (PR–PAS)	5,400	44.0%	1,444	Abdul Manan Ismail (BN–UMNO)	15,833	84%	13%	3%		12,464	78.7%	199	1.6%
N20	Pulau Manis	Khairuddin Mahmud (BN–UMNO)	8,237	70.0%	Othman Bakar (PR–PAS)	3,084	26.2%	5,153	Ariff Sabri Abdul Aziz (BN–UMNO)	14,173	93%	3%		3%	12,069	85.2%	309	2.6%
N21	Peramu Jaya	Ibrahim Awang Ismail (BN–UMNO)	10,903	63.3%	Abu Kassim Manaf (PR–PAS)	6,231	36.2%	4,672	Wan Iqbal Afdza Wan Abdul Hamid (BN–UMNO)	21,523	94%	4%			17,524	81.4%	309	1.8%
N22	Bebar	Ishak Muhamad (BN–UMNO)	5,467	73.8%	Ahiatuddin Daud (PR–PAS)	1,927	26.0%	3,540	Ishak Muhamad (BN–UMNO)	9,664	87%		2%	10%	7,738	80.1%	332	4.3%
N23	Chini	Abu Bakar Harun (BN–UMNO)	7,398	71.9%	Mohd Fadhil Noor Abdul Karim (PR–PAS)	2,874	27.9%	4,524	Abu Bakar Harun (BN–UMNO)	12,857	96%			4%	10,539	82.0%	249	2.4%
N24	Luit	Ahmad Munawar Abdul Jalil (BN–UMNO)	4,076	57.3%	Azizah Khatib Mat (PR–PAS)	3,008	42.3%	1,068	Ahmad Munawar Abdul Jalil (BN–UMNO)	9,396	81%	17%			7,225	76.9%	112	1.6%
N25	Kuala Sentul	Shahaniza Shamsuddin (BN–UMNO)	5,420	66.4%	Bostamin Bakar (PR–PKR)	2,723	33.4%	2,697	Rosni Zahari (BN–UMNO)	10,901	90%	7%	3%		8,369	76.8%	209	2.5%
N26	Chenor	Tan Mohd Aminuddin Ishak (BN–UMNO)	6,170	62.1%	Mujibur Rahman Ishak (PR–PAS)	3,702	37.2%	2,468	Tan Mohd Aminuddin Ishak (BN–UMNO)	12,220	98%				10,109	82.7%	168	1.7%
N27	Jenderak	Mohamed Jaafar (BN–UMNO)	3,745	61.1%	Suhaimi Said (PR–PKR)	2,371	38.7%	1,374	Mohamed Jaafar (BN–UMNO)	8,139	78%	10%		7%	6,318	77.6%	190	3.0%
N28	Kerdau	Zaharuddin Abu Kassim (BN–UMNO)	4,135	62.0%	Hassanuddin Salim (PR–PAS)	2,520	37.8%	1,615	Redzwan Harun (BN–UMNO)	8,451	89%	6%	4%		6,789	80.3%	122	1.8%
N29	Jengka	Wan Salman Wan Ismail (BN–UMNO)	7,454	52.1%	Tuan Ibrahim Tuan Man (PR–PAS)	6,858	47.9%	596	Abdul Rahman Ibrahim (BN–UMNO)	17,549	98%		2%		14,461	82.4%	149	1.0%
N30	Mentakab	Chuah Boon Seong (BN–MCA)	6,321	57.0%	Ng Kwi Ling (PR–DAP)	3,882	35.0%	2,439	Chuah Boon Seong (BN–MCA)	15,143	50%	45%	5%		11,463	75.7%	366	3.2%
N30	Mentakab	Chuah Boon Seong (BN–MCA)	6,321	57.0%	Mohd Shokri Mahmood (IND)	863	7.8%	2,439	Chuah Boon Seong (BN–MCA)	15,143	50%	45%	5%		11,463	75.7%	366	3.2%
N31	Lanchang	Mohd Sharkar Shamsudin (BN–UMNO)	8,010	57.5%	Ahmad Saim Abu Bakar (PR–PKR)	5,871	42.1%	2,139	Mohd Sharkar Shamsudin (BN–UMNO)	18,564	60%	21%	17%		14,251	76.8%	318	2.2%
N32	Kuala Semantan	Syed Hamid Syed Mohamed (PR–PAS)	8,136	52.7%	Mohd Khairuddin Abdul Manan (BN–UMNO)	7,204	46.6%	932	Md. Hamdan Sudin (BN–UMNO)	20,303	78%	18%	4%		15,715	77.4%	267	1.7%
N33	Bilut	Hoh Khai Mun (BN–MCA)	6,024	54.6%	Tam Tai San (PR–DAP)	4,916	44.5%	1,108	Hoh Khai Mun (BN–MCA)	15,390	32%	59%	9%		11,357	73.8%	318	2.8%
N34	Ketari	Ng Keong Chye (BN–GERAKAN)	6,835	53.3%	Lee Kok Yeep (PR–DAP)	5,953	46.4%	882	Ng Keong Chye (BN–GERAKAN)	18,384	42%	52%	5%		13,081	71.2%	261	2.0%
N35	Sabai	Davendran Murthy (BN–MIC)	3,304	51.0%	Kamache Doray Rajoo (PR–DAP)	3,159	48.8%	145	Davendran Murthy (BN–MIC)	9,486	37%	43%	19%		6,716	70.8%	236	3.5%
N36	Pelangai	Adnan Yaakob (BN–UMNO)	5,406	68.8%	Hamdan Ahmad (PR–PAS)	2,436	31.0%	2,970	Adnan Yaakob (BN–UMNO)	10,391	67%	25%	7%		8,010	77.1%	154	1.9%
N37	Guai	Norolazali Sulaiman (BN–UMNO)	6,780	58.4%	Musaniff Ab Rahman (PR–PAS)	4,839	41.7%	1,941	Hamzah Ibrahim (BN–UMNO)	14,881	89%	8%	3%		11,804	79.3%	185	1.6%
N38	Triang	Leong Ngah Ngah (PR–DAP)	7,121	60.5%	Tan Tin Loon (BN–GERAKAN)	4,652	39.5%	2,469	Leong Ngah Ngah (DAP)	15,844	23%	72%	5%		12,047	76.0%	274	2.3%
N39	Kemayan	Mohd Fadzil Osman (BN–UMNO)	6,328	70.5%	Mohd Shukri Mohd Ramli (PR–PKR)	2,650	29.5%	3,678	Mohd Hayani Abdul Rahman (BN–UMNO)	12,268	76%	16%	6%		9,215	75.1%	237	2.6%
N40	Bukit Ibam	Mohamad Sahfri Ab Aziz (BN–UMNO)	7,326	60.6%	Shukri Ahmad (PR–PAS)	4,658	38.5%	2,668	Mohamad Sahfri Ab Aziz (BN–UMNO)	15,499	96%			3%	12,408	80.1%	309	2.5%
N41	Muadzam Shah	Maznah Mazlan (BN–UMNO)	6,681	67.7%	Rabidin Kasmawi (PR–PKR)	3,161	32.1%	3,520	Maznah Mazlan (BN–UMNO)	12,741	94%		2%	3%	10,145	79.6%	282	2.8%
N42	Tioman	Mohd. Johari Hussain (BN–UMNO)	6,375	62.7%	Mohd Fadzli Mohd Ramly (PR–PAS)	3,761	37.0%	2,614	Md Rusli Ismail (BN–UMNO)	13,461	90%	7%		3%	10,376	77.1%	208	2.0%

== Selangor ==
#	Constituency	Winner	Votes	Votes %	Opponent(s)	Votes	Votes %	Majority	Incumbent	Eligible voters	Malay voters	Chinese voters	Indian voters	Others voters	Voter turnout	Voter turnout %	Spoilt votes	Spoilt votes %
N01	Sungai Air Tawar	Raja Ideris Raja Ahmad (BN–UMNO)	4,791	50.5%	Azrul Khakim Suradi (PR–PAS)	4,668	49.2%	123	Abdul Rahman Bakri (BN–UMNO)	12,726	84%	13%	4%		9,751	76.6%	263	2.7%
N02	Sabak	Warno Dogol (BN–UMNO)	7,001	50.2%	Sallehen Mukhyi (PR–PAS)	6,884	49.4%	117	Raja Ideris Raja Ahmad (BN–UMNO)	18,655	80%	14%	6%		14,325	76.8%	390	2.7%
N03	Sungai Panjang	Mohamad Khir Toyo (BN–UMNO)	11,181	67.4%	Fadzlin Taslimin (PR–PAS)	5,353	32.3%	5,828	Khir Toyo (BN–UMNO)	20,500	85%	13%			16,906	82.5%	319	1.9%
N04	Sekinchan	Ng Suee Lim (PR–DAP)	5,403	50.5%	Puah Boon Choon (BN–MCA)	5,213	48.7%	190	Ng Suee Lim (DAP)	13,573	42%	56%	2%		11,021	81.2%	317	2.9%
N05	Hulu Bernam	Mohamed Idris Abu Bakar (BN–UMNO)	7,985	63.3%	Abdul Sukor Ali (PR–PAS)	4,436	35.2%	3,549	Mohamed Idris Abu Bakar (BN–UMNO)	17,549	68%	17%	15%		12,932	73.7%	318	2.5%
N06	Kuala Kubu Baharu	Wong Koon Mun (BN–MCA)	6,555	51.3%	Annamalai Ramu Kandasamy (PR–DAP)	6,107	47.8%	448	Ch'ng Toh Eng (BN–MCA)	18,212	32%	46%	22%		13,332	73.2%	549	4.1%
N07	Batang Kali	Mohd Isa Abu Kasim (BN–UMNO)	11,724	55.1%	Mohd Nashruddin Abd Aziz (PR–PKR)	9,545	44.9%	2,179	Zainal Abidin Sakom (BN–UMNO)	27,832	59%	20%	20%		21,673	77.9%	404	1.9%
N08	Sungai Burong	Mohd Shamsudin Lias (BN–UMNO)	8,872	58.9%	Abdul Ghani Samsudin (PR–PAS)	6,162	40.9%	2,710	Mohd Shamsudin Lias (BN–UMNO)	18,988	86%	11%	3%		15,403	81.1%	336	2.2%
N09	Permatang	Sulaiman Abdul Razak (BN–UMNO)	6,975	52.2%	Mazlan Hassan (PR–PKR)	6,367	47.7%	608	Abdul Aziz Mohd Noh (BN–UMNO)	17,403	57%	23%	21%		13,648	78.4%	286	2.1%
N10	Bukit Melawati	Muthiah Maria Pillay (PR–PKR)	4,741	51.4%	Parthiban Karuppiah (BN–MIC)	4,444	48.2%	297	Mohamed Sayuti Said (BN–UMNO)	12,897	57%	13%	31%		9,707	75.3%	484	5.0%
N11	Ijok	Abdul Khalid Ibrahim (PR–PKR)	7,196	57.7%	Mohamed Sayuti Said (BN–UMNO)	5,276	42.3%	1,920	Sivalingam Arumugam Karupiah (BN–MIC)	15,467	50%	18%	32%		12,684	82.0%	204	1.6%
N12	Jeram	Amiruddin Setro (BN–UMNO)	8,209	54.9%	Hairi @ Maruji Darmo (PR–PAS)	6,733	45.0%	1,476	Amiruddin Setro (BN–UMNO)	18,839	73%	16%	11%		15,281	81.1%	333	2.2%
N13	Kuang	Abdul Shukur Idrus (BN–UMNO)	7,049	50.4%	Badrul Amin Bahron (PR–PKR)	6,532	46.7%	517	Soohaimi Abdul Rahman (BN–UMNO)	17,557	56%	26%	18%		14,198	80.9%	204	1.4%
N14	Rawang	Gan Pei Nei (PR–PKR)	10,467	59.9%	Goh Ah Ling (BN–MCA)	6,275	35.9%	4,192	Tang See Hang (BN–MCA)	23,345	19%	56%	23%		17,768	76.1%	288	1.6%
N14	Rawang	Gan Pei Nei (PR–PKR)	10,467	59.9%	Chandrasegaran Arumugam (IND)	704	4.0%	4,192	Tang See Hang (BN–MCA)	23,345	19%	56%	23%		17,768	76.1%	288	1.6%
N15	Taman Templer	Subahan Kamal (BN–UMNO)	14,600	50.9%	Mohamad Abdul Rahman (PR–PAS)	13,987	48.7%	613	Ahmad Bhari Abd Rahman (BN–UMNO)	38,655	55%	33%	12%		29,285	75.8%	583	2.0%
N16	Batu Caves	Amirudin Shari (PR–PKR)	11,015	58.5%	Mohan Thangarasu (BN–MIC)	7,376	39.1%	3,639	Jagarasah Verasamy (BN–MIC)	25,720	62%	15%	22%		19,165	74.5%	320	1.7%
N16	Batu Caves	Amirudin Shari (PR–PKR)	11,015	58.5%	Azmi Hussain (IND)	379	2.0%	3,639	Jagarasah Verasamy (BN–MIC)	25,720	62%	15%	22%		19,165	74.5%	320	1.7%
N17	Gombak Setia	Hasan Mohamed Ali (PR–PAS)	14,391	54.4%	Yuszahari Mohd Yusoff (BN–UMNO)	11,594	43.9%	2,797	Yuszahari Mohd Yusoff (BN–UMNO)	34,979	80%	11%	8%		26,726	76.4%	287	1.1%
N18	Hulu Kelang	Saari Sungib (PR–PAS)	15,404	53.4%	Ahmad Bujang (BN–UMNO)	13,270	46.0%	2,134	Ahmad Bujang (BN–UMNO)	38,454	81%	15%	3%		29,178	75.9%	302	1.0%
N19	Bukit Antarabangsa	Mohamed Azmin Ali (PR–PKR)	11,731	52.9%	Haslinda Mohd Zerain (BN–UMNO)	10,350	46.7%	1,381	Azman Wahid (BN–UMNO)	30,687	57%	37%	5%		22,397	73.0%	224	1.0%
N20	Lembah Jaya	Khasim Abdul Aziz (PR–PAS)	15,182	53.9%	Ismail Kijo (BN–UMNO)	12,954	46.0%	2,228	Ismail Kijo (BN–UMNO)	38,445	55%	32%	12%		28,697	74.6%	503	1.8%
N21	Chempaka	Iskandar Abdul Samad (PR–PAS)	12,528	51.9%	Nosimah Hashim (BN–UMNO)	11,480	47.6%	1,048	Mad Aris Mad Yusof (BN–UMNO)	33,525	58%	36%	6%		24,519	73.1%	396	1.6%
N22	Teratai	Jenice Lee Ying Ha (PR–DAP)	15,563	67.5%	Lum Weng Keong (BN–GERAKAN)	7,478	32.5%	8,085	Yap Soo Sun (BN–GERAKAN)	30,972	40%	55%	5%		23,733	76.6%	692	2.9%
N23	Dusun Tua	Ismail Sani (BN–UMNO)	13,542	53.9%	Mohd Sany Hamzan (PR–PAS)	11,579	46.1%	1,963	Rahmad Musa (BN–UMNO)	32,248	57%	35%	7%		25,580	79.3%	459	1.8%
N24	Semenyih	Johan Abd Aziz (BN–UMNO)	11,588	51.8%	Arutchelvan Subramaniams (PR–PKR)	10,448	46.7%	1,140	Ahmad Kuris Mohd Nor (BN–UMNO)	28,203	54%	29%	17%		22,929	81.3%	544	2.4%
N25	Kajang	Lee Kim Sin (PR–PKR)	13,220	57.1%	Low Lee Leng (BN–MCA)	9,952	43.0%	3,268	Low Lee Leng (BN–MCA)	29,868	47%	44%	9%		23,732	79.5%	560	2.4%
N26	Bangi	Shafie Abu Bakar (PR–PAS)	17,201	60.5%	Mohd Fathil Daud (BN–UMNO)	11,009	38.7%	6,192	Amran Kasimin (BN–UMNO)	35,898	65%	21%	14%		28,815	80.3%	386	1.3%
N27	Balakong	Yap Lum Chin (PR–DAP)	13,335	60.8%	Lai Kwong Choy (BN–MCA)	8,540	38.9%	4,795	Hoh Hee Lee (BN–MCA)	28,682	33%	56%	10%		22,288	77.7%	357	1.6%
N28	Seri Kembangan	Ean Yong Hian Wah (PR–DAP)	15,841	64.0%	Liew Yuen Keong (BN–MCA)	8,597	34.7%	7,244	Liew Yuen Keong (BN–MCA)	30,297	7%	85%	8%		25,127	82.9%	361	1.4%
N28	Seri Kembangan	Ean Yong Hian Wah (PR–DAP)	15,841	64.0%	Wong Kok Yew (IND)	294	1.2%	7,244	Liew Yuen Keong (BN–MCA)	30,297	7%	85%	8%		25,127	82.9%	361	1.4%
N29	Seri Serdang	Mohamad Satim Diman (BN–UMNO)	18,932	49.9%	Ahmad Idzam Ahmad (PR–PAS)	18,887	49.7%	45	Mohamad Satim Diman (BN–UMNO)	49,757	52%	32%	16%		38,799	78.0%	827	2.1%
N30	Kinrara	Teresa Kok Suh Sim (PR–DAP)	12,990	64.1%	Kow Cheong Wei (BN–MCA)	7,251	35.8%	5,739	Kow Cheong Wei (BN–MCA)	25,868	27%	58%	14%		20,517	79.3%	255	1.2%
N31	Subang Jaya	Hannah Yeoh Tseow Suan (PR–DAP)	23,459	70.8%	Ong Chong Swen @ Ong Chong Siew (BN–MCA)	9,608	29.0%	13,851	Lee Hwa Beng (BN–MCA)	44,569	32%	56%	10%		33,465	75.1%	345	1.0%
N32	Seri Setia	Nik Nazmi Nik Ahmad (PR–PKR)	13,838	55.7%	Seripah Noli Syed Hussin (BN–UMNO)	10,975	44.2%	2,863	Seripah Noli Syed Hussin (BN–UMNO)	35,079	54%	16%	28%		25,163	71.7%	302	1.2%
N33	Taman Medan	Haniza Mohamed Talha (PR–PKR)	16,803	57.5%	Munaliza Hamzah (BN–UMNO)	12,370	42.4%	4,433	Abdul Wahab Ibrahim (BN–UMNO)	40,009	61%	22%	16%		29,652	74.1%	440	1.5%
N34	Bukit Gasing	Edward Lee Poh Lin (PR–DAP)	15,735	69.4%	Lim Thuang Seng (BN–GERAKAN)	6,923	30.6%	8,812	Lim Thuang Seng (BN–GERAKAN)	33,183	14%	71%	12%		22,875	68.9%	214	0.9%
N35	Kampung Tunku	Lau Weng San (PR–DAP)	14,633	68.7%	Sheah Kok Fah (BN–MCA)	6,656	31.2%	7,977	Wong Sai Hou (BN–MCA)	30,183	21%	67%	10%		21,537	71.4%	234	1.1%
N36	Damansara Utama	Cheah Wing Yin (PR–DAP)	24,881	72.3%	Victor Gu Chian Peow (BN–MCA)	9,526	27.7%	15,355	Lim Choon Kin (BN–MCA)	46,435	12%	83%	4%		34,757	74.9%	324	0.9%
N37	Bukit Lanjan	Elizabeth Wong Keat Ping (PR–PKR)	12,125	63.4%	Yong Dai Ying (BN–GERAKAN)	6,970	36.5%	5,155	Yong Dai Ying (BN–GERAKAN)	25,550	32%	53%	15%		19,420	76.0%	299	1.5%
N38	Paya Jaras	Muhammad Bushro Mat Johor (BN–UMNO)	11,521	51.3%	Mohd Khairuddin Othman (PR–PAS)	10,879	48.5%	642	Muhammad Bushro Mat Johor (BN–UMNO)	29,163	60%	27%	12%		22,883	78.5%	429	1.9%
N39	Kota Damansara	Mohd Nasir Hashim (PR–PKR)	11,846	51.6%	Zein Isma Ismail (BN–UMNO)	10,771	46.9%	1,075	Mokhtar Ahmad Dahalan (BN–UMNO)	29,701	56%	30%	14%		23,566	79.3%	603	2.6%
N40	Kota Anggerik	Yaakob Sapari (PR–PKR)	15,738	53.5%	Ahmad Nawawi M. Zin (BN–UMNO)	13,538	46.0%	2,200	Ahmad Nawawi M. Zin (BN–UMNO)	38,442	68%	17%	13%		29,830	77.6%	383	1.3%
N41	Batu Tiga	Rodziah Ismail (PR–PKR)	15,852	56.3%	Salamon Selamat (BN–UMNO)	12,289	43.6%	3,563	Salamon Selamat (BN–UMNO)	36,892	69%	14%	17%		28,526	77.3%	346	1.2%
N42	Meru	Abd Rani Osman (PR–PAS)	14,826	61.3%	Md Ghazali Md Amin (BN–UMNO)	9,313	38.5%	5,513	Jaei Ismail (BN–UMNO)	29,745	60%	28%	12%		24,515	82.4%	339	1.4%
N43	Sementa	Abd Rahman Palil (BN–UMNO)	0		Unopposed	0		0	Abd Rahman Palil (BN–UMNO)	29,382	49%	27%	24%					
N44	Sungai Pinang	Teng Chang Khim (PR–DAP)	12,856	70.0%	Song Kee Chai (BN–MCA)	5,495	29.9%	7,361	Teng Chang Khim (DAP)	24,189	28%	66%	5%		18,695	77.3%	328	1.8%
N45	Selat Klang	Halimah Ali (PR–PAS)	11,437	53.3%	Norliza Ahmad (BN–UMNO)	9,978	46.5%	1,459	Norliza Ahmad (BN–UMNO)	28,908	64%	26%	9%		21,787	75.4%	334	1.5%
N46	Pelabuhan Klang	Badrul Hisham Abdullah (PR–PKR)	12,397	59.1%	Roselinda Abd Jamil (BN–UMNO)	7,990	38.1%	4,407	Zakaria Deros (BN–UMNO)	28,456	55%	27%	17%		21,475	75.5%	485	2.3%
N46	Pelabuhan Klang	Badrul Hisham Abdullah (PR–PKR)	12,397	59.1%	Nazir Mansor (IND)	580	2.8%	4,407	Zakaria Deros (BN–UMNO)	28,456	55%	27%	17%		21,475	75.5%	485	2.3%
N47	Pandamaran	Ronnie Liu Tian Khiew (PR–DAP)	12,547	63.6%	Teh Kim Poo (BN–MCA)	7,149	36.3%	5,398	Teh Kim Poo (BN–MCA)	25,192	25%	59%	15%		20,034	79.5%	319	1.6%
N48	Kota Alam Shah	Manoharan Malayalam (PR–DAP)	12,699	69.7%	Ching Su Chen (BN–GERAKAN)	5,515	30.3%	7,184	Ching Su Chen (BN–GERAKAN)	24,168	17%	58%	23%		18,425	76.2%	211	1.2%
N49	Seri Andalas	Xavier Jayakumar Arulanandam (PR–PKR)	20,258	66.8%	Kamala Ganapathy (BN–MIC)	10,055	33.2%	10,203	Kamala Ganapathy (BN–MIC)	38,833	43%	23%	33%		31,039	79.9%	725	2.3%
N50	Sri Muda	Mat Shuhaimi Shafiei (PR–PKR)	15,962	61.5%	Amzah Umar (BN–UMNO)	9,988	38.5%	5,974	Amzah Umar (BN–UMNO)	33,054	54%	23%	23%		26,297	79.6%	347	1.3%
N51	Sijangkang	Ahmad Yunus Hairi (PR–PAS)	10,049	55.2%	Abdul Fatah Iskandar (BN–UMNO)	7,968	43.8%	2,081	Abdul Fatah Iskandar (BN–UMNO)	22,759	67%	15%	18%		18,578	81.6%	374	2.0%
N52	Teluk Datuk	Philip Tan Choon Swee (PR–DAP)	7,584	52.4%	Ei Kim Hock (BN–MCA)	6,886	47.6%	698	Ei Kim Hock (BN–MCA)	18,207	33%	45%	22%		14,972	82.2%	493	3.3%
N53	Morib	Hasiman Sidom (BN–UMNO)	10,116	50.3%	Mohammad Sallehuddin Hafiz (PR–PAS)	9,830	48.8%	286	Hasiman Sidom (BN–UMNO)	25,549	61%	23%	16%		20,535	80.4%	404	2.0%
N54	Tanjong Sepat	Karim Mansor (BN–UMNO)	8,297	58.3%	Mohd Haslin Hassan (PR–PAS)	5,923	41.6%	2,374	Karim Mansor (BN–UMNO)	17,827	57%	28%	15%		14,517	81.4%	287	2.0%
N55	Dengkil	Marsum Paing (BN–UMNO)	11,838	58.2%	Ishammudin Ismail (PR–PKR)	8,471	41.6%	3,367	Suhaimi Ghazali (BN–UMNO)	26,322	72%	10%	17%		20,763	78.9%	417	2.0%
N56	Sungai Pelek	Yap Ee Wah (BN–MCA)	7,053	52.5%	Sivananthan Arumugam (PR–DAP)	5,481	40.8%	1,572	Liew Chee Khong @ Liew Chee Choong (BN–MCA)	17,895	41%	38%	22%		13,858	77.4%	431	3.1%
N56	Sungai Pelek	Yap Ee Wah (BN–MCA)	7,053	52.5%	Ab Manap Sahardin (IND)	816	6.1%	1,572	Liew Chee Khong @ Liew Chee Choong (BN–MCA)	17,895	41%	38%	22%		13,858	77.4%	431	3.1%

== Negeri Sembilan ==
#	Constituency	Winner	Votes	Votes %	Opponent(s)	Votes	Votes %	Majority	Incumbent	Eligible voters	Malay voters	Chinese voters	Indian voters	Others voters	Voter turnout	Voter turnout %	Spoilt votes	Spoilt votes %
N01	Chennah	Siow Chen Pin (BN–MCA)	4,091	58.7%	How Wee Shiong (PR–DAP)	2,793	40.1%	1,298	Lim Yong @ Lim Chen (BN–MCA)	9,898	44%	54%	3%		7,203	72.8%	231	3.2%
N02	Pertang	Razak Mansor (BN–UMNO)	3,887	66.7%	Halim A. Aziz (PR–PKR)	1,892	32.4%	1,995	Razak Mansor (BN–UMNO)	8,173	67%	24%	8%		6,030	73.8%	198	3.3%
N03	Sungai Lui	Zainal Abidin Ahmad (BN–UMNO)	6,791	72.3%	Kateran Marman (PR–PAS)	2,416	25.7%	4,375	Zainal Abidin Ahmad (BN–UMNO)	12,163	81%	8%	11%		9,611	79.0%	224	2.3%
N04	Kelawang	Yunus Rahmat (BN–UMNO)	3,379	55.5%	Saiful Bahri Jaaman (PR–PAS)	2,538	41.7%	841	Jalaluddin Alias (BN–UMNO)	8,448	63%	33%	4%		6,279	74.3%	189	3.0%
N05	Serting	Shamshulkahar Mohd. Deli (BN–UMNO)	7,618	70.1%	Somingon Nasir (PR–PAS)	3,240	29.8%	4,378	Lilah Yasin (BN–UMNO)	14,687	72%	19%	10%		11,100	75.6%	229	2.1%
N06	Palong	Aziz Shamsudin (BN–UMNO)	6,942	71.8%	Rebin Birham (PR–PKR)	2,725	28.2%	4,217	Aziz Shamsudin (BN–UMNO)	12,567	90%	2%	8%		9,992	79.5%	325	3.3%
N07	Jeram Padang	Mogan Velayatham (BN–MIC)	4,185	63.8%	Manoharan K. Kannan (PR–PKR)	2,377	36.2%	1,808	Krishnan Letchumanan (BN–MIC)	9,960	48%	14%	39%		6,845	68.7%	283	4.1%
N08	Bahau	Teo Kok Seong (PR–DAP)	6,188	53.6%	Lim Fui Ming (BN–MCA)	5,351	46.4%	837	Lim Fui Ming (DAP)	16,264	28%	66%	6%		11,846	72.8%	307	2.6%
N09	Lenggeng	Mustafa Salim (BN–UMNO)	5,555	56.5%	Zulkefly Mohamad Omar (PR–PAS)	4,270	43.5%	1,285	Ishak Ismail (BN–UMNO)	12,879	75%	17%	8%		10,013	77.8%	188	1.9%
N10	Nilai	Yap Yew Weng (PR–DAP)	6,755	58.1%	Peter Lai Yit Fee (BN–MCA)	4,861	41.8%	1,894	Peter Lai Yit Fee (BN–MCA)	16,009	27%	52%	21%		11,909	74.4%	275	2.3%
N11	Lobak	Anthony Loke Siew Fook (PR–DAP)	9,244	79.9%	Siow Koi Loon (BN–MCA)	2,316	20.0%	6,928	Loke Siew Fook (DAP)	15,162	4%	80%	16%		11,714	77.3%	143	1.2%
N12	Temiang	Ng Chin Tsai (PR–DAP)	4,290	58.7%	Jason Lee Kee Chong (BN–MCA)	2,952	40.4%	1,338	Lee Yuen Fong (BN–MCA)	9,848	29%	62%	9%		7,482	76.0%	174	2.3%
N13	Sikamat	Aminuddin Harun (PR–PKR)	6,036	51.9%	Md Yusop Harmain Shah (BN–UMNO)	5,537	47.6%	499	Md Yusop Harmain Shah (BN–UMNO)	15,491	58%	33%	9%		11,830	76.4%	203	1.7%
N14	Ampangan	Rashid Latiff (PR–PKR)	5,679	50.6%	Mohd Nor Awang (BN–UMNO)	5,514	49.1%	165	Zakaria Nordin (BN–UMNO)	15,286	59%	33%	8%		11,458	75.0%	236	2.1%
N15	Juasseh	Mohammad Razi Kail (BN–UMNO)	4,169	66.5%	Ghazalli Othman (PR–PKR)	2,101	33.5%	2,068	Mohammad Razi Kail (BN–UMNO)	8,495	82%	13%	6%		6,430	75.7%	160	2.5%
N16	Seri Menanti	Abdul Samad Ibrahim (BN–UMNO)	3,934	69.2%	Mohamad Noor Abdul Rahman (PR–PAS)	1,743	30.7%	2,191	Ibrahim Jahaya (BN–UMNO)	7,653	96%	4%			5,825	76.1%	139	2.4%
N17	Senaling	Ismail Lasim (BN–UMNO)	3,646	69.0%	Zaharudin Othman (PR–PAS)	1,632	30.9%	2,014	Ismail Lasim (BN–UMNO)	7,014	75%	21%	4%		5,418	77.3%	133	2.5%
N18	Pilah	Adnan Abu Hasan (BN–UMNO)	4,359	58.1%	Asmaon Basir (PR–PKR)	3,101	41.4%	1,258	Norhayati Omar (BN–UMNO)	10,513	65%	26%	8%		7,680	73.1%	182	2.4%
N19	Johol	Roslan Mohd Yusof (BN–UMNO)	3,737	60.2%	Kamarudin Md Tahir (PR–PAS)	2,474	39.8%	1,263	Roslan Mohd Yusof (BN–UMNO)	8,653	72%	22%	6%		6,437	74.4%	226	3.5%
N20	Labu	Hasim Rusdi (BN–UMNO)	5,451	57.4%	Mokhtar Ahmad (PR–PKR)	4,046	42.6%	1,405	Muhamad Sahlan Shaid (BN–UMNO)	12,477	68%	14%	18%		9,702	77.8%	204	2.1%
N21	Bukit Kepayang	Cha Kee Chin (PR–DAP)	9,333	72.0%	Chan Khee Voon (BN–GERAKAN)	3,633	28.0%	5,700	Chan Khee Voon (BN–GERAKAN)	16,510	14%	65%	21%		13,154	79.7%	187	1.4%
N22	Rahang	Arumugam Karuppan (PR–DAP)	5,868	54.8%	Yip Chee Kiong (BN–MCA)	4,777	44.6%	1,091	Yip Chee Kiong (BN–MCA)	14,262	29%	49%	21%		10,997	77.1%	290	2.6%
N23	Mambau	Wong May May (PR–DAP)	9,580	73.2%	Goh Siow Huat (BN–MCA)	3,491	26.7%	6,089	Yu Chok Tow (BN–MCA)	16,298	14%	65%	21%		13,252	81.3%	169	1.3%
N24	Senawang	Gunasekaren Palasamy (PR–DAP)	6,512	67.2%	Woo Ah Lek @ Woo Siak Chee (BN–GERAKAN)	3,177	32.8%	3,335	Woo Ah Lek @ Woo Siak Chee (BN–GERAKAN)	12,568	21%	58%	21%		9,843	78.3%	150	1.5%
N25	Paroi	Mohamad Taufek Abd Ghani (PR–PAS)	9,423	53.0%	Zaharuddin Mohd Shariff (BN–UMNO)	8,316	46.8%	1,107	Bibi Sharliza Mohd Khalid (BN–UMNO)	23,060	65%	17%	18%		18,076	78.4%	299	1.7%
N26	Chembong	Zaifulbahri Idris (BN–UMNO)	7,017	70.3%	Zakaria Dahlan (PR–PAS)	2,944	29.5%	4,073	Muhammad Rais Zainuddin (BN–UMNO)	12,997	78%	10%	12%		10,155	78.1%	175	1.7%
N27	Rantau	Mohamad Hasan (BN–UMNO)	7,739	64.8%	Aisah Lamsah (PR–PKR)	3,956	33.1%	3,783	Mohamad Hasan (BN–UMNO)	15,124	53%	23%	25%		12,216	80.8%	271	2.2%
N28	Kota	Awaludin Said (BN–UMNO)	6,278	70.1%	Azhar Ibrahim (PR–PAS)	2,665	29.8%	3,613	Awaludin Said (BN–UMNO)	11,715	87%	8%	5%		9,199	78.5%	244	2.7%
N29	Chuah	Chai Tong Chai (PR–PKR)	4,415	58.7%	Foo Ming Chee (BN–MCA)	3,091	41.1%	1,324	Foo Ming Chee (BN–MCA)	10,159	26%	58%	22%		7,681	75.6%	164	2.1%
N30	Lukut	Ean Yong Tin Sin (PR–DAP)	5,579	63.8%	Cheok Leong Huat (BN–MCA)	3,161	36.2%	2,418	Yeow Chai Thiam (BN–MCA)	11,276	17%	62%	21%		8,923	79.1%	180	2.0%
N31	Bagan Pinang	Azman Mohd Nor (BN–UMNO)	6,430	57.4%	Ramli Ismail (PR–PAS)	4,097	36.6%	2,333	Mohd Faizal Ramli (BN–UMNO)	14,192	66%	11%	20%		11,579	81.6%	384	3.3%
N32	Linggi	Ismail Taib (BN–UMNO)	5,510	57.9%	Ramlan Roes (PR–PKR)	3,935	41.4%	1,575	Ismail Taib (BN–UMNO)	12,711	55%	24%	20%		9,813	77.2%	296	3.0%
N33	Port Dickson	Ravi Munusamy (PR–PKR)	4,475	53.0%	Rajagopalu Thamotharapillay (BN–MIC)	3,742	44.3%	733	Rajagopalu Thamotharapillay (BN–MIC)	11,848	34%	37%	29%		8,617	72.7%	177	2.1%
N33	Port Dickson	Ravi Munusamy (PR–PKR)	4,475	53.0%	Jeeva Kumar Marimuthu (IND)	196	2.3%	733	Rajagopalu Thamotharapillay (BN–MIC)	11,848	34%	37%	29%		8,617	72.7%	177	2.1%
N34	Gemas	Zainab Nasir (BN–UMNO)	10,811	77.9%	Mohd Ali Maarof (PR–PAS)	2,846	20.5%	7,965	Jamlus Aziz (BN–UMNO)	17,966	83%	10%	6%		14,226	79.2%	345	2.4%
N35	Gemencheh	Mohd Kamil Abd Aziz (BN–UMNO)	6,600	66.3%	Zakaria Khalim (PR–PAS)	3,359	33.7%	3,241	Mohd Kamil Abd Aziz (BN–UMNO)	13,870	61%	24%	15%		10,219	73.7%	260	2.5%
N36	Repah	Veerapan Superamaniam (PR–DAP)	5,977	52.4%	Yap Seong Fook (BN–MCA)	5,424	47.6%	553	Gan Chin Yap (BN–MCA)	15,819	36%	44%	20%		11,842	74.9%	441	3.7%

== Malacca ==
#	Constituency	Winner	Votes	Votes %	Opponent(s)	Votes	Votes %	Majority	Incumbent	Eligible voters	Malay voters	Chinese voters	Indian voters	Others voters	Voter turnout	Voter turnout %	Spoilt votes	Spoilt votes %
N01	Kuala Linggi	Ismail Othman (BN–UMNO)	4,468	64.1%	Julasapiyah Kassim (PR–PAS)	2,491	35.8%	1,977	Abdul Rahman Palit (BN–UMNO)	8,933	72%	26%	2%		7,105	79.5%	137	1.9%
N02	Tanjung Bidara	Ab Karim Sulaiman (BN–UMNO)	4,664	77.2%	Imran Abdul Rahman (PR–PAS)	1,360	22.5%	3,304	Ab Karim Sulaiman (BN–UMNO)	7,613	94%	5%			6,143	80.7%	103	1.7%
N03	Ayer Limau	Amiruddin Yusop (BN–UMNO)	4,948	75.8%	Abu Hussin Tamby (PR–PKR)	1,565	24.0%	3,383	Idderis Kassim (BN–UMNO)	8,737	90%	5%	5%		6,667	76.3%	138	2.1%
N04	Lendu	Idderis Kassim (BN–UMNO)	3,798	62.9%	Mohd Amir Yaakub (PR–PAS)	2,165	35.9%	1,633	Abd Haziz Abdul Gani (BN–UMNO)	7,978	75%	19%	5%		6,152	77.1%	113	1.8%
N05	Taboh Naning	Latipah Omar (BN–UMNO)	3,873	70.2%	Abd Halim Said (PR–PAS)	1,626	29.5%	2,247	Nawi Ahmad (BN–UMNO)	7,345	80%	14%	6%		5,648	76.9%	130	2.3%
N06	Rembia	Norpipah Abdol (BN–UMNO)	5,605	66.7%	Md. Yusof Abdullah (PR–PKR)	2,763	32.9%	2,842	Abdul Wahab Abdul Latip (BN–UMNO)	10,946	63%	23%	14%		8,613	78.7%	214	2.5%
N07	Gadek	Abdul Ghafar Atan (BN–UMNO)	5,326	69.6%	Kanageswari Sibapatham (PR–PKR)	2,310	30.2%	3,016	Abdul Ghafar Atan (BN–UMNO)	10,749	54%	35%	11%		7,878	73.3%	228	2.9%
N08	Machap	Lai Meng Chong (BN–MCA)	4,707	60.5%	Ginie Lim Siew Lin (PR–PKR)	3,068	39.4%	1,639	Poh Ah Tiam (BN–MCA)	10,358	39%	46%	15%		7,986	77.1%	201	2.5%
N09	Durian Tunggal	Ab Wahab Ab Latip (BN–UMNO)	4,317	60.2%	Ab Ghani Ab Rahman (PR–PAS)	2,841	39.6%	1,476	Hamdin Abdollah (BN–UMNO)	8,919	68%	24%	8%		7,343	82.3%	173	2.4%
N10	Asahan	Perumal Raju (BN–MIC)	5,950	61.1%	Amdan Sudin (PR–PAS)	3,772	38.7%	2,178	Raghavan Raman (BN–MIC)	13,125	58%	29%	12%		10,039	76.5%	301	3.0%
N11	Sungai Udang	Yaakub Md Amin (BN–UMNO)	10,282	76.2%	Zulkefly Othman (PR–PKR)	2,277	16.9%	8,005	Yaakub Md Amin (BN–UMNO)	15,488	86%	5%		7%	14,157	91.4%	663	4.7%
N12	Pantai Kundor	Ab Rahaman Ab Karim (BN–UMNO)	5,816	63.9%	Kamis Saat (PR–PAS)	3,283	36.1%	2,533	Ab Rahaman Ab Karim (BN–UMNO)	11,889	79%	20%			9,251	77.8%	152	1.6%
N13	Paya Rumput	Tahir Hassan (BN–UMNO)	7,581	56.9%	Taha Ahmad (PR–PKR)	5,687	42.7%	1,894	Tahir Hassan (BN–UMNO)	16,589	56%	35%	9%		13,578	81.9%	243	1.8%
N14	Kelebang	Seet Har Cheow (BN–MCA)	6,591	55.2%	Koh Sze Choon (PR–DAP)	5,288	44.3%	1,303	Seet Har Cheow (BN–MCA)	16,222	54%	43%	2%		12,641	77.9%	700	5.5%
N15	Bachang	Lim Jak Wong (PR–DAP)	9,237	50.4%	Wendy Ngo Kim Hua (BN–GERAKAN)	8,720	47.6%	517	Chua Peng Song (BN–GERAKAN)	23,153	49%	46%	5%		18,834	81.4%	498	2.6%
N16	Ayer Keroh	Khoo Poay Tiong (PR–DAP)	11,309	58.1%	Chiew Hong Lan (BN–MCA)	8,104	41.6%	3,205	Seah Kwi Tong (BN–MCA)	24,504	36%	56%	8%		19,953	81.4%	477	2.4%
N17	Bukit Baru	Mohd Ali Rustam (BN–UMNO)	7,644	60.5%	Bakrin Sidek (PR–PAS)	4,936	39.1%	2,708	Mohd Ali Rustam (BN–UMNO)	15,904	60%	36%	4%		12,845	80.8%	213	1.7%
N18	Ayer Molek	Md Yunos Husin (BN–UMNO)	6,433	63.6%	Salim H Tahir (PR–PAS)	3,654	36.1%	2,779	Md Yunos Husin (BN–UMNO)	12,216	86%	10%	4%		10,291	84.2%	170	1.7%
N19	Kesidang	Goh Leong San (PR–DAP)	7,241	55.3%	Koh Nai Kwong (BN–MCA)	5,842	44.6%	1,399	Koh Nai Kwong (BN–MCA)	16,472	33%	64%	2%		13,325	80.9%	221	1.7%
N20	Kota Laksamana	Betty Chew Gek Cheng (PR–DAP)	11,043	74.3%	Lee Kiat Lee (BN–MCA)	3,801	25.6%	7,242	Betty Chew Gek Cheng (DAP)	18,930	11%	86%	3%		15,055	79.5%	196	1.3%
N21	Duyong	Gan Tian Loo (BN–MCA)	6,442	53.3%	Damien Yeo Shen Li (PR–DAP)	5,636	46.7%	806	Gan Tian Loo (BN–MCA)	15,585	45%	51%	4%		12,331	79.1%	253	2.1%
N22	Bandar Hilir	Tey Kok Kiew (PR–DAP)	9,591	67.2%	Chock Choon Sin (BN–MCA)	4,679	32.8%	4,912	Goh Leong San (DAP)	18,771	12%	78%		6%	14,421	76.8%	151	1.1%
N23	Telok Mas	Latiff Tamby Chik (BN–UMNO)	7,129	59.1%	Abd Rahman Jaafar (PR–PAS)	4,890	40.6%	2,239	Amid Nordin (BN–UMNO)	15,047	70%	28%	2%		12,274	81.6%	220	1.8%
N24	Bemban	Chua Kheng Hwa (BN–MCA)	6,031	60.6%	Steven Ho Kia Kim (PR–DAP)	3,890	39.1%	2,141	Chong Tam On (BN–MCA)	13,544	60%	26%	15%		10,547	77.9%	590	5.6%
N25	Rim	Yazed Khamis (BN–UMNO)	4,316	61.6%	Azmi Kamis (PR–PKR)	2,679	38.2%	1,637	Ramlah Abas (BN–UMNO)	9,288	58%	26%	16%		7,146	76.9%	139	2.0%
N26	Serkam	Ghazale Muhamad (BN–UMNO)	6,997	62.5%	Kamarudin Sedik (PR–PAS)	4,178	37.3%	2,819	Ahmad Hamzah (BN–UMNO)	13,636	89%	8%	3%		11,363	83.3%	173	1.5%
N27	Merlimau	Mohamad Hidhir Abu Hassan (BN–UMNO)	4,981	63.6%	Jasme Tompang (PR–PAS)	2,827	36.1%	2,154	Mohamad Hidhir Abu Hassan (BN–UMNO)	10,471	65%	21%	14%		7,977	76.2%	149	1.9%
N28	Sungai Rambai	Hasan Abd Rahman (BN–UMNO)	4,872	65.1%	Aminuddin Abdul Jalil (PR–PAS)	2,606	34.8%	2,266	Abu Pit (BN–UMNO)	9,182	81%	16%	3%		7,616	82.9%	131	1.7%

== Johor ==
#	Constituency	Winner	Votes	Votes %	Opponent(s)	Votes	Votes %	Majority	Incumbent	Eligible voters	Malay voters	Chinese voters	Indian voters	Others voters	Voter turnout	Voter turnout %	Spoilt votes	Spoilt votes %
N01	Buloh Kasap	Othman Jais (BN–UMNO)	7,691	70.5%	Firdaus Masod (PR–PAS)	3,225	29.5%	4,466	Othman Jais (BN–UMNO)	15,424	53%	34%	14%		11,276	73.1%	360	3.2%
N02	Jementah	Lee Hong Tee (BN–MCA)	9,658	53.6%	Pang Hok Liong (PR–DAP)	8,352	46.4%	1,306	Lee Hong Tee (BN–MCA)	25,284	34%	56%	10%		18,434	72.9%	424	2.3%
N03	Pemanis	Lau Chin Hoon (BN–GERAKAN)	9,708	68.0%	Othman Selamat (PR–PAS)	4,573	32.0%	5,135	Lau Chin Hoon (BN–GERAKAN)	19,355	54%	41%	5%		14,634	75.6%	353	2.4%
N04	Kemelah	Ayub Rahmat (BN–UMNO)	8,639	73.0%	Mohd Barudin Nor (PR–PKR)	3,204	27.1%	5,435	Ayub Rahmat (BN–UMNO)	15,783	56%	38%	6%		12,082	76.6%	239	2.0%
N05	Tenang	Sulaiman Taha (BN–UMNO)	6,367	62.1%	Md Saim Siran (PR–PAS)	3,875	37.8%	2,492	Sulaiman Taha (BN–UMNO)	14,511	50%	38%	12%		10,669	73.5%	413	3.9%
N06	Bekok	Tan Kok Hong (BN–MCA)	7,510	57.3%	Chang Teck Chee (PR–DAP)	5,566	42.5%	1,944	Tan Kok Hong (BN–MCA)	18,957	27%	55%	18%		13,412	70.8%	304	2.3%
N07	Bukit Serampang	Tahir Mohd Taat (BN–UMNO)	10,605	75.9%	Mahfodz Mohamed (PR–PAS)	3,355	24.0%	7,250	Tahir Mohd Taat (BN–UMNO)	18,880	68%	29%	2%		14,338	75.9%	356	2.5%
N08	Jorak	Shahruddin Md Salleh (BN–UMNO)	10,097	64.7%	Othman Hashim (PR–PAS)	5,493	35.2%	4,604	Samat Aripin (BN–UMNO)	21,162	58%	36%	6%		15,974	75.5%	356	2.2%
N09	Gambir	M Asojan Muniyandy (BN–MIC)	8,190	58.8%	Kasim Ibrahim (PR–PAS)	5,727	41.1%	2,463	M Asojan Muniyandy (BN–MIC)	18,724	55%	41%	4%		14,434	77.1%	499	3.5%
N10	Tangkak	Goh Tee Tee (BN–MCA)	7,130	51.0%	Lee Fu Haw (PR–DAP)	6,835	48.9%	295	Yap Chik Dong (BN–MCA)	19,198	37%	54%	9%		14,514	75.6%	522	3.6%
N11	Serom	Abdul Ghani Othman (BN–UMNO)	10,088	66.1%	Rusman Kemin (PR–PAS)	5,117	33.5%	4,971	Abdul Ghani Othman (BN–UMNO)	20,579	65%	34%			15,609	75.9%	348	2.2%
N12	Bentayan	Gwee Tong Hiang (PR–DAP)	9,118	59.0%	Lee Ching Yong (BN–MCA)	6,322	40.9%	2,796	Lau Yee Wee (BN–MCA)	21,233	23%	74%	2%		15,737	74.1%	277	1.8%
N13	Sungai Abong	Sheikh Ibrahim Salleh (PR–PAS)	8,776	54.7%	Kamarudin Suratman (BN–UMNO)	7,226	45.1%	1,550	Haris Salleh (BN–UMNO)	21,592	53%	44%	3%		16,349	75.7%	317	1.9%
N14	Bukit Naning	Abdullah @ Md Khalid Md Ali (BN–UMNO)	6,716	62.8%	Elias @ Alias Shamsir (PR–PKR)	3,821	35.7%	2,895	Abdullah @ Md Khalid Md Ali (BN–UMNO)	13,547	60%	39%			11,061	81.7%	367	3.3%
N15	Maharani	Mohammad Taslim (PR–PAS)	8,154	50.3%	Mohd Ismail Mohd Shah (BN–UMNO)	7,996	49.4%	158	Mohd Ismail Mohd Shah (BN–UMNO)	22,902	54%	42%	3%		16,551	72.3%	354	2.1%
N16	Sungai Balang	Robiah Kosai (BN–UMNO)	7,667	57.5%	Malik Mohamed Diah (PR–PAS)	5,649	42.4%	2,018	Robia Kosai (BN–UMNO)	18,117	72%	28%			13,722	75.7%	391	2.9%
N17	Semerah	Ariss Samsudin (BN–UMNO)	13,156	61.8%	Muhamad Hasmi Hashim (PR–PKR)	8,082	38.0%	5,074	Ariss Samsudin (BN–UMNO)	28,563	62%	38%			21,828	76.4%	545	2.5%
N18	Sri Medan	Ahmad Zahri Jamil (BN–UMNO)	12,488	72.0%	Saja @ Mearaj Patani (PR–PAS)	4,834	27.9%	7,654	Ahmad Zahri Jamil (BN–UMNO)	21,671	89%	11%			17,807	82.2%	466	2.6%
N19	Yong Peng	Lim Kee Moi (BN–MCA)	8,064	59.1%	Ng Lam Swa (PR–DAP)	5,571	40.8%	2,493	Lim Kee Moi (BN–MCA)	18,328	30%	63%	7%		14,134	77.1%	490	3.5%
N20	Semarang	Samsolbari Jamali (BN–UMNO)	10,180	77.9%	Alliar A Bakar (PR–PAS)	2,866	21.9%	7,314	Samsolbari Jamali (BN–UMNO)	16,477	85%	14%			13,354	81.1%	287	2.2%
N21	Parit Yaani	Ng See Tiong (BN–MCA)	9,419	62.7%	Hashim Jusoh (PR–PAS)	5,562	37.0%	3,857	Ng See Tiong (BN–MCA)	19,545	57%	42%			15,373	78.7%	358	2.3%
N22	Parit Raja	Aziz Kaprawi (BN–UMNO)	9,690	71.3%	Mustafha Abd Rahman (PR–PAS)	3,863	28.4%	5,827	Aziz Kaprawi (BN–UMNO)	17,300	75%	23%	2%		13,926	80.5%	334	2.4%
N23	Penggaram	Koh Chee Chai (BN–MCA)	12,761	48.8%	Gan Peck Cheng (PR–DAP)	12,186	46.6%	575	Koh Chee Chai (BN–MCA)	34,519	37%	60%	2%		27,411	79.4%	1,232	4.5%
N24	Senggarang	Ja'affar Hashim (BN–UMNO)	9,034	60.0%	Mohd Ramli Md Kari (PR–PAS)	6,006	39.9%	3,028	Mohd Ramli Md Kari (BA–PAS)	19,799	59%	41%			15,495	78.3%	428	2.8%
N25	Rengit	Ayub Jamil (BN–UMNO)	8,656	71.8%	Hasanuddin Mohd Yunus (PR–PAS)	3,377	28.0%	5,279	Ayub Jamil (BN–UMNO)	15,751	79%	21%			12,354	78.4%	293	2.4%
N26	Machap	Abd Hamid Abd Rahman (BN–UMNO)	8,909	65.3%	Abdullah Husin (PR–PAS)	4,731	34.7%	4,178	Abd Hamid Abd Rahman (BN–UMNO)	18,244	60%	35%	5%		14,017	76.8%	369	2.6%
N27	Layang-Layang	Onn Mohd Yassin (BN–UMNO)	7,015	60.4%	Yap Weng Keong @ Yap Weng Leong (PR–PKR)	4,573	39.4%	2,442	Onn Mohd Yassin (BN–UMNO)	16,615	47%	37%	16%		11,981	72.1%	375	3.1%
N28	Mengkibol	Ng Lam Hua (PR–DAP)	13,538	51.8%	Gan Ping Shou @ Gan Ping Sieu (BN–MCA)	12,257	46.9%	1,281	Gan Ping Shou @ Gan Ping Sieu (BN–MCA)	35,253	26%	62%	13%		26,717	75.8%	561	2.1%
N29	Mahkota	Md Jais Sarday (BN–UMNO)	17,489	65.2%	Khairul Faizi Ahmad Kamil (PR–PAS)	9,009	33.6%	8,480	Gapar Gorrohu (BN–UMNO)	35,980	51%	43%	5%		27,849	77.4%	1,038	3.7%
N30	Paloh	Hoo Seong Chang (BN–MCA)	6,988	62.4%	Tan Ting Chow (PR–DAP)	4,194	37.4%	2,794	Choong Ah Onn @ Chong Ah Owon (BN–MCA)	16,084	36%	47%	17%		11,563	71.9%	360	3.1%
N31	Kahang	Vidyananthan Ramanadhan (BN–MIC)	9,272	69.9%	Abdul Halim Mohamad Dawam (PR–PKR)	3,948	29.8%	5,324	Ramis Subramaniam (BN–MIC)	17,097	71%	26%	2%		13,648	79.8%	386	2.8%
N32	Endau	Zainal Abidin Osman (BN–UMNO)	7,393	65.5%	Ahmad Said (PR–PAS)	3,866	34.3%	3,527	Zainal Abidin Osman (BN–UMNO)	16,269	78%	21%			11,550	71.0%	261	2.3%
N33	Tenggaroh	Murukasvary Thanarajan (BN–MIC)	11,789	76.2%	Shahar Abdullah (PR–PAS)	3,556	23.0%	8,233	Krishnasamy Shiman (BN–MIC)	20,176	80%	17%	2%		15,999	79.3%	527	3.3%
N34	Panti	Baderi Dasuki (BN–UMNO)	9,466	82.7%	Abdul Rashid Abu Bakar (PR–PAS)	1,963	17.2%	7,503	Baderi Dasuki (BN–UMNO)	14,448	87%	9%	4%		11,638	80.6%	189	1.6%
N35	Pasir Raja	Adham Baba (BN–UMNO)	9,399	76.6%	Menhad Awab (PR–PAS)	2,873	23.4%	6,526	Halimah Mohamed Sadique (BN–UMNO)	17,849	64%	26%	9%		12,633	70.8%	361	2.9%
N36	Sedili	Rasman Ithnain (BN–UMNO)	14,017	91.8%	Mona'im Hassan (PR–PAS)	1,259	8.2%	12,758	Abdul Rashid Mokhti (BN–UMNO)	19,190	96%	3%			15,606	81.3%	330	2.1%
N37	Johor Lama	Asiah Md Ariff (BN–UMNO)	8,668	78.6%	Kamaldin Tahir (PR–PAS)	2,363	21.4%	6,305	Asiah Md Ariff (BN–UMNO)	15,000	70%	26%	4%		11,259	75.1%	228	2.0%
N38	Penawar	Hamimah Mansor (BN–UMNO)	11,466	89.0%	Md Paimon Jasmin (PR–PAS)	1,364	10.6%	10,102	Mohd 'Azam Razuan (BN–UMNO)	16,498	99%				13,056	79.1%	172	1.3%
N39	Tanjong Surat	Harun Abdullah (BN–UMNO)	10,487	85.7%	Abd Razak Esa (PR–PKR)	1,279	10.5%	9,208	Harun Abdullah (BN–UMNO)	16,504	75%	23%			12,456	75.5%	215	1.7%
N40	Tiram	Maulizan Bujang (BN–UMNO)	17,005	65.8%	Kumutha Rahman (PR–PKR)	8,827	34.2%	8,178	Maulizan Bujang (BN–UMNO)	34,018	53%	33%	14%		26,512	77.9%	680	2.6%
N41	Puteri Wangsa	Abdul Halim Suleiman (BN–UMNO)	13,656	63.3%	Selva Kumaran M. Kanan (PR–PKR)	7,935	36.8%	5,721	Abdul Halim Suleiman (BN–UMNO)	28,487	45%	43%	11%		22,076	77.5%	485	2.2%
N42	Johor Jaya	Tan Cher Puk (BN–MCA)	19,538	67.8%	Md Nasir Ab Wahab (PRM)	9,050	31.4%	10,488	Tan Cher Puk (BN–MCA)	38,167	44%	49%	7%		29,517	77.3%	713	2.4%
N43	Permas	Munusamy Mareemuthu (BN–MIC)	13,878	53.8%	Syed Othman Abdullah (PR–PAS)	11,860	46.0%	2,018	Paliksina Siwalinggam (BN–MIC)	34,695	54%	31%	15%		26,374	76.0%	590	2.2%
N44	Tanjong Puteri	Adam Sumiru (BN–UMNO)	23,023	71.3%	Subramaniam Paidathally (PR–PKR)	9,283	28.7%	13,740	Ali Mohamed (BN–UMNO)	47,062	61%	34%	5%		33,020	70.2%	711	2.2%
N45	Stulang	Mok Chek Hou (BN–MCA)	16,273	55.9%	Norman Joseph Fernandez (PR–DAP)	10,092	34.7%	6,181	Freddie Lonh Hoo Min @ Long Ah Mui (BN–MCA)	42,663	40%	55%	4%		29,898	70.1%	770	2.6%
N45	Stulang	Mok Chek Hou (BN–MCA)	16,273	55.9%	Song Sing Kwee (PRM)	2,198	7.6%	6,181	Freddie Lonh Hoo Min @ Long Ah Mui (BN–MCA)	42,663	40%	55%	4%		29,898	70.1%	770	2.6%
N46	Pengkalan Rinting	Chia Song Cheng (BN–MCA)	21,203	65.9%	Rahmatullah Abdul (PR–PAS)	10,829	33.7%	10,374	Low Teh Hian (BN–MCA)	46,664	49%	41%	10%		32,763	70.2%	610	1.9%
N47	Kempas	Osman Sapian (BN–UMNO)	15,897	67.2%	Suhaizan Kayat (PR–PAS)	7,711	32.6%	8,186	Osman Sapian (BN–UMNO)	32,958	54%	35%	9%		24,102	73.1%	439	1.8%
N48	Skudai	Boo Cheng Hau (PR–DAP)	23,124	69.2%	Teo Eng Tee @ Teo Kok Chee (BN–GERAKAN)	10,270	30.7%	12,854	Teo Eng Tee @ Teo Kok Chee (BN–GERAKAN)	44,459	22%	66%	12%		34,029	76.5%	590	1.7%
N49	Nusajaya	Abd Aziz Sapian (BN–UMNO)	16,643	64.1%	Md Shah Lamat (PR–PAS)	9,259	35.7%	7,384	Abd Aziz Sapian (BN–UMNO)	34,217	49%	39%	12%		26,699	78.0%	750	2.8%
N50	Bukit Permai	Kamaruzaman Ali (BN–UMNO)	8,385	72.1%	Mohd Badzihar Mohd Basri (PR–PAS)	3,193	27.4%	5,192	Zainal Abidin Jidin (BN–UMNO)	14,863	55%	34%	11%		12,116	81.5%	479	4.0%
N51	Bukit Batu	Cheong Chin Liang (BN–GERAKAN)	8,805	57.6%	Liew Shin Kheong (PR–PKR)	6,464	42.3%	2,341	Cheong Chin Liang (BN–GERAKAN)	19,556	31%	63%	6%		15,810	80.8%	524	3.3%
N52	Senai	Ong Kow Meng (PR–DAP)	14,612	57.9%	Chun Yoon Fook (BN–MCA)	10,582	42.0%	4,030	Chun Yoon Fook (BN–MCA)	32,939	22%	68%	10%		25,800	78.3%	577	2.2%
N53	Benut	Hasni Mohammad (BN–UMNO)	10,098	72.6%	Sarobo Ponoh (PR–PAS)	3,794	27.3%	6,304	Salehan Sungot (BN–UMNO)	18,646	79%	21%			14,376	77.1%	457	3.2%
N54	Pulai Sebatang	Tee Siew Kiong (BN–MCA)	11,878	66.0%	Shamsuddin Jaafar (PR–PAS)	6,113	34.0%	5,765	Tee Siew Kiong (BN–MCA)	24,618	60%	38%			18,460	75.0%	469	2.5%
N55	Pekan Nanas	Tang Nai Soon (BN–MCA)	12,297	57.8%	Ahmad Ton (PR–DAP)	8,973	42.2%	3,324	Wee Jeck Seng (BN–MCA)	28,012	38%	61%			21,746	77.6%	476	2.2%
N56	Kukup	Mohd. Othman Yusof (BN–UMNO)	10,897	82.8%	Ahmad Sani Kemat (PR–PAS)	2,258	17.2%	8,639	Jamaliah @ Jamilah Endan (BN–UMNO)	17,689	70%	30%			13,605	76.9%	450	3.3%

== Sabah ==
#	Constituency	Winner	Votes	Votes %	Opponent(s)	Votes	Votes %	Majority	Incumbent	Eligible voters	Chinese voters	Others voters	Muslim Bumiputera voters	Non-Muslim Bumiputera voters	Voter turnout	Voter turnout %	Spoilt votes	Spoilt votes %
N01	Banggi	Abdul Mijul Unaini (BN–UMNO)	3,351	68.7%	Mursalim Tanjul (PR–PKR)	1,327	27.2%	2,024	Amir Kahar Mustapha (BN–UMNO)	8,187			63%	37%	5,109	62.4%	232	4.5%
N01	Banggi	Abdul Mijul Unaini (BN–UMNO)	3,351	68.7%	Martin Lantop (BERSEKUTU)	87	1.8%	2,024	Amir Kahar Mustapha (BN–UMNO)	8,187			63%	37%	5,109	62.4%	232	4.5%
N01	Banggi	Abdul Mijul Unaini (BN–UMNO)	3,351	68.7%	Kusugan Ali (IND)	70	1.4%	2,024	Amir Kahar Mustapha (BN–UMNO)	8,187			63%	37%	5,109	62.4%	232	4.5%
N01	Banggi	Abdul Mijul Unaini (BN–UMNO)	3,351	68.7%	Usmar Uyuh (PASOK)	34	0.7%	2,024	Amir Kahar Mustapha (BN–UMNO)	8,187			63%	37%	5,109	62.4%	232	4.5%
N02	Tanjong Kapor	Teo Chee Kang (BN–LDP)	6,629	52.3%	Tsen Heng Chong @ Peter Tsen (IND)	3,010	23.8%	3,619	Chong Kah Kiat (BN–LDP)	19,500	29%		47%	23%	13,234	67.9%	567	4.3%
N02	Tanjong Kapor	Teo Chee Kang (BN–LDP)	6,629	52.3%	Ng Kim Kiat (PR–PKR)	1,831	14.5%	3,619	Chong Kah Kiat (BN–LDP)	19,500	29%		47%	23%	13,234	67.9%	567	4.3%
N02	Tanjong Kapor	Teo Chee Kang (BN–LDP)	6,629	52.3%	Awang Karim Abdul Kadir (IND)	871	6.9%	3,619	Chong Kah Kiat (BN–LDP)	19,500	29%		47%	23%	13,234	67.9%	567	4.3%
N02	Tanjong Kapor	Teo Chee Kang (BN–LDP)	6,629	52.3%	Edwin Pius @ Entak (IND)	109	0.9%	3,619	Chong Kah Kiat (BN–LDP)	19,500	29%		47%	23%	13,234	67.9%	567	4.3%
N02	Tanjong Kapor	Teo Chee Kang (BN–LDP)	6,629	52.3%	Asbiah Anggar (IND)	73	0.6%	3,619	Chong Kah Kiat (BN–LDP)	19,500	29%		47%	23%	13,234	67.9%	567	4.3%
N02	Tanjong Kapor	Teo Chee Kang (BN–LDP)	6,629	52.3%	Masiun Mupang (IND)	35	0.3%	3,619	Chong Kah Kiat (BN–LDP)	19,500	29%		47%	23%	13,234	67.9%	567	4.3%
N02	Tanjong Kapor	Teo Chee Kang (BN–LDP)	6,629	52.3%	Berman Angkap (BERSEKUTU)	32	0.3%	3,619	Chong Kah Kiat (BN–LDP)	19,500	29%		47%	23%	13,234	67.9%	567	4.3%
N03	Pitas	Bolkiah Ismail (BN–UMNO)	5,761	72.6%	Paulus Itom (PR–PKR)	1,913	24.1%	3,848	Masrani Parman (BN–UMNO)	11,956			58%	41%	8,213	68.7%	277	3.4%
N03	Pitas	Bolkiah Ismail (BN–UMNO)	5,761	72.6%	Yusoff Matarang (IND)	127	1.6%	3,848	Masrani Parman (BN–UMNO)	11,956			58%	41%	8,213	68.7%	277	3.4%
N03	Pitas	Bolkiah Ismail (BN–UMNO)	5,761	72.6%	Jolly Majalap @ Lucundus Harry (IND)	120	1.5%	3,848	Masrani Parman (BN–UMNO)	11,956			58%	41%	8,213	68.7%	277	3.4%
N04	Matunggong	Sarapin Magana (BN–PBS)	6,701	63.1%	Muada Ojihi (PR–PKR)	3,719	35.0%	2,982	Jornah Mozihim (BN–PBS)	15,400	2%		17%	81%	10,879	70.6%	254	2.3%
N04	Matunggong	Sarapin Magana (BN–PBS)	6,701	63.1%	Santain Manurun (BERSEKUTU)	191	1.8%	2,982	Jornah Mozihim (BN–PBS)	15,400	2%		17%	81%	10,879	70.6%	254	2.3%
N05	Tandek	Lasiah Baranting @ Anita (BN–PBS)	5,598	49.5%	Jurin K K Gunsalam @ Saidina Ali (PR–PKR)	3,361	29.7%	2,237	Maximus Ongkili (BN–PBS)	16,538	4%		36%	59%	11,675	70.6%	364	3.1%
N05	Tandek	Lasiah Baranting @ Anita (BN–PBS)	5,598	49.5%	Andy Vilison (IND)	1,678	14.8%	2,237	Maximus Ongkili (BN–PBS)	16,538	4%		36%	59%	11,675	70.6%	364	3.1%
N05	Tandek	Lasiah Baranting @ Anita (BN–PBS)	5,598	49.5%	Masingkan @ Shingkan Masampun (BERSEKUTU)	202	1.8%	2,237	Maximus Ongkili (BN–PBS)	16,538	4%		36%	59%	11,675	70.6%	364	3.1%
N05	Tandek	Lasiah Baranting @ Anita (BN–PBS)	5,598	49.5%	Isang Rawai (IND)	112	1.0%	2,237	Maximus Ongkili (BN–PBS)	16,538	4%		36%	59%	11,675	70.6%	364	3.1%
N06	Tempasuk	Musbah Jamli (BN–UMNO)	6,541	60.3%	Laiman Ikin @ Ag Laiman Kakimin (PR–PKR)	4,109	37.9%	2,432	Pandikar Amin Mulia (BN–UMNO)	14,291			66%	33%	11,167	78.1%	324	2.9%
N06	Tempasuk	Musbah Jamli (BN–UMNO)	6,541	60.3%	Ibrahim Linggam (IND)	191	1.8%	2,432	Pandikar Amin Mulia (BN–UMNO)	14,291			66%	33%	11,167	78.1%	324	2.9%
N07	Kadamaian	Timbon @ Herbert Lagadan (BN–PBS)	5,382	53.7%	Lukia Indan (PR–PKR)	2,909	29.0%	2,473	Timbon @ Herbert Lagadan (BN–PBS)	12,964			14%	86%	10,288	79.4%	268	2.6%
N07	Kadamaian	Timbon @ Herbert Lagadan (BN–PBS)	5,382	53.7%	Peter Marajin @ Peter Marazing (IND)	1,729	17.3%	2,473	Timbon @ Herbert Lagadan (BN–PBS)	12,964			14%	86%	10,288	79.4%	268	2.6%
N08	Usukan	Japlin Akim @ Abd Hamid (BN–UMNO)	7,964	66.8%	Mohd Shukor Abdul Mumin (PR–PKR)	3,941	33.0%	4,023	Japlin Akim @ Abd Hamid (BN–UMNO)	15,816	5%		90%	6%	12,263	77.5%	336	2.7%
N09	Tamparuli	Jahid @ Noordin Jahim (BN–PBS)	6,568	62.1%	Henry Misun (PR–PKR)	3,825	36.2%	2,743	Jahid @ Noordin Jahim (BN–PBS)	14,912	16%		23%	61%	10,785	72.3%	204	1.9%
N09	Tamparuli	Jahid @ Noordin Jahim (BN–PBS)	6,568	62.1%	Silim Yamin (IND)	188	1.8%	2,743	Jahid @ Noordin Jahim (BN–PBS)	14,912	16%		23%	61%	10,785	72.3%	204	1.9%
N10	Sulaman	Hajiji Noor (BN–UMNO)	8,961	71.9%	Umsery @ Ansari Abdullah (PR–PKR)	3,505	28.1%	5,456	Hajiji Noor (BN–UMNO)	16,076	3%		82%	15%	12,770	79.4%	304	2.4%
N11	Kiulu	Lovis Rampas (BN–PBS)	4,051	59.3%	Gaibin Ransoi (PR–PKR)	2,785	40.7%	1,266	Lovis Rampas (BN–PBS)	9,773	3%		11%	86%	6,968	71.3%	132	1.9%
N12	Karambunai	Jainab Ahmad (BN–UMNO)	7,914	60.8%	Ag Maidin Ag Apong (PR–PKR)	4,896	37.6%	3,018	Jainab Ahmad (BN–UMNO)	19,951	10%		78%	12%	13,416	67.2%	399	3.0%
N13	Inanam	Goh Chin Lok @ Johnny Goh (BN–PBS)	5,979	44.8%	Roland Chia Ming Shen (PR–PKR)	4,293	32.2%	1,686	Goh Chin Lok @ Johnny Goh (BN–PBS)	19,300	34%		19%	46%	13,626	70.6%	274	2.0%
N13	Inanam	Goh Chin Lok @ Johnny Goh (BN–PBS)	5,979	44.8%	Jeffrey Kumin @ John (PR–DAP)	2,864	21.5%	1,686	Goh Chin Lok @ Johnny Goh (BN–PBS)	19,300	34%		19%	46%	13,626	70.6%	274	2.0%
N13	Inanam	Goh Chin Lok @ Johnny Goh (BN–PBS)	5,979	44.8%	Clarence Chin @ Clay (IND)	196	1.5%	1,686	Goh Chin Lok @ Johnny Goh (BN–PBS)	19,300	34%		19%	46%	13,626	70.6%	274	2.0%
N14	Likas	Liew Teck Chan (BN–SAPP)	4,097	43.6%	Joan Goh Penn Nee (PR–DAP)	3,235	34.4%	862	Liew Teck Chan (BN–SAPP)	15,178	73%		17%	10%	9,519	62.7%	111	1.2%
N14	Likas	Liew Teck Chan (BN–SAPP)	4,097	43.6%	Yap Siew Kiong (PR–PKR)	1,888	20.1%	862	Liew Teck Chan (BN–SAPP)	15,178	73%		17%	10%	9,519	62.7%	111	1.2%
N14	Likas	Liew Teck Chan (BN–SAPP)	4,097	43.6%	Kong Yu Kiong (IND)	182	1.9%	862	Liew Teck Chan (BN–SAPP)	15,178	73%		17%	10%	9,519	62.7%	111	1.2%
N15	Api-Api	Yee Moh Chai (BN–PBS)	3,419	50.9%	Christina Liew Chin Jin (PR–PKR)	3,245	48.3%	174	Yee Moh Chai (BN–PBS)	10,775	84%		9%	7%	6,832	63.4%	110	1.6%
N16	Luyang	Melanie Chia Chui Ket (BN–SAPP)	5,073	43.8%	Fung Kong Win (PR–DAP)	3,571	30.9%	1,502	Melanie Chia Chui Ket (BN–SAPP)	17,761	80%		9%	10%	11,668	65.7%	95	0.8%
N16	Luyang	Melanie Chia Chui Ket (BN–SAPP)	5,073	43.8%	Alexander Wong Yun Kong (PR–PKR)	2,794	24.1%	1,502	Melanie Chia Chui Ket (BN–SAPP)	17,761	80%		9%	10%	11,668	65.7%	95	0.8%
N16	Luyang	Melanie Chia Chui Ket (BN–SAPP)	5,073	43.8%	Chin Fung Vui @ Bernard (IND)	92	0.8%	1,502	Melanie Chia Chui Ket (BN–SAPP)	17,761	80%		9%	10%	11,668	65.7%	95	0.8%
N17	Tanjong Aru	Edward Yong Oui Fah (BN–PBS)	6,430	52.7%	Awang Ahmad Sah (PR–PKR)	3,470	28.4%	2,960	Edward Yong Oui Fah (BN–PBS)	19,993	36%		52%	11%	12,437	62.2%	225	1.8%
N17	Tanjong Aru	Edward Yong Oui Fah (BN–PBS)	6,430	52.7%	Yang Chan Tsze @ Teddy Yang (PR–DAP)	2,298	18.8%	2,960	Edward Yong Oui Fah (BN–PBS)	19,993	36%		52%	11%	12,437	62.2%	225	1.8%
N18	Petagas	Yahyah @ Yahya Hussin Ag Husin (BN–UMNO)	6,700	63.7%	Salleh Tiasi @ Tiaseh (PR–PKR)	3,132	29.8%	3,568	Yahyah @ Yahya Hussin Ag Husin (BN–UMNO)	14,942	8%		77%	15%	10,859	72.7%	332	3.1%
N19	Kapayan	Edward Khoo Keok Hai (BN–MCA)	6,162	43.5%	Stephen Jacob Jimbangan (PR–DAP)	4,100	29.0%	2,062	Edward Khoo Keok Hai (BN–MCA)	20,723	47%		17%	35%	14,356	69.3%	200	1.4%
N19	Kapayan	Edward Khoo Keok Hai (BN–MCA)	6,162	43.5%	Chow Chin Thong @ Chau Chin Tang (PR–PKR)	3,658	25.8%	2,062	Edward Khoo Keok Hai (BN–MCA)	20,723	47%		17%	35%	14,356	69.3%	200	1.4%
N20	Moyog	Donald Peter Mojuntin (BN–UPKO)	6,782	61.2%	Moris @ Francis Miji (PR–PKR)	4,097	37.0%	2,685	Philip Benedict Lasimbang (BN–UPKO)	15,098	47%		4%	83%	11,195	74.2%	119	1.1%
N20	Moyog	Donald Peter Mojuntin (BN–UPKO)	6,782	61.2%	Levired Misih @ Willybroad Missi (IND)	166	1.5%	2,685	Philip Benedict Lasimbang (BN–UPKO)	15,098	47%		4%	83%	11,195	74.2%	119	1.1%
N21	Kawang	Ghulam Haidar @ Yusof Khan Bahadar (BN–UMNO)	8,605	73.3%	Zavilin @ Evelyn Gabili (PR–PKR)	2,539	21.6%	6,066	Ghulam Haidar @ Yusof Khan Bahadar (BN–UMNO)	15,591	10%		63%	27%	12,008	77.0%	262	2.2%
N21	Kawang	Ghulam Haidar @ Yusof Khan Bahadar (BN–UMNO)	8,605	73.3%	Pengiran Othman Rauf @ Awang (IND)	295	2.5%	6,066	Ghulam Haidar @ Yusof Khan Bahadar (BN–UMNO)	15,591	10%		63%	27%	12,008	77.0%	262	2.2%
N21	Kawang	Ghulam Haidar @ Yusof Khan Bahadar (BN–UMNO)	8,605	73.3%	Maiji Jaigul (BERSEKUTU)	144	1.2%	6,066	Ghulam Haidar @ Yusof Khan Bahadar (BN–UMNO)	15,591	10%		63%	27%	12,008	77.0%	262	2.2%
N22	Pantai Manis	Abdul Rahim Ismail (BN–UMNO)	7,223	57.5%	Ag Bakar Ag Hussain (PR–PKR)	4,361	34.7%	2,862	Abdul Rahim Ismail (BN–UMNO)	16,688	13%		63%	24%	12,850	77.0%	278	2.2%
N22	Pantai Manis	Abdul Rahim Ismail (BN–UMNO)	7,223	57.5%	Welfred Kilos (BERSEKUTU)	579	4.6%	2,862	Abdul Rahim Ismail (BN–UMNO)	16,688	13%		63%	24%	12,850	77.0%	278	2.2%
N22	Pantai Manis	Abdul Rahim Ismail (BN–UMNO)	7,223	57.5%	Mohd Hashim Yussup @ Yusof (IND)	130	1.0%	2,862	Abdul Rahim Ismail (BN–UMNO)	16,688	13%		63%	24%	12,850	77.0%	278	2.2%
N23	Bongawan	Karim Bujang (BN–UMNO)	7,123	75.0%	Md Haris Md Tahir (IND)	1,393	14.7%	5,730	Karim Bujang (BN–UMNO)	12,389	7%		68%	25%	9,711	78.4%	218	2.2%
N23	Bongawan	Karim Bujang (BN–UMNO)	7,123	75.0%	Ag Wasli Ag Yahya (PR–PKR)	875	9.2%	5,730	Karim Bujang (BN–UMNO)	12,389	7%		68%	25%	9,711	78.4%	218	2.2%
N23	Bongawan	Karim Bujang (BN–UMNO)	7,123	75.0%	Lusin Balangon (BERSEKUTU)	97	1.0%	5,730	Karim Bujang (BN–UMNO)	12,389	7%		68%	25%	9,711	78.4%	218	2.2%
N24	Membakut	Mohd. Arifin Mohd. Arif (BN–UMNO)	5,490	73.3%	Awang Tangah Awang Amin (PR–PKR)	1,991	26.6%	3,499	Mohd Arifin Mohd Arif (BN–UMNO)	9,850	3%		61%	33%	7,656	77.7%	168	2.2%
N25	Klias	Azizah Mohd Dun (BN–UMNO)	5,900	61.3%	Abdul Rahman Md Yakub (PR–PKR)	3,487	36.2%	2,413	Lajim Ukin (BN–UMNO)	13,885	16%		70%	14%	9,983	71.9%	361	3.6%
N25	Klias	Azizah Mohd Dun (BN–UMNO)	5,900	61.3%	Taufick Ruschi (IND)	109	1.1%	2,413	Lajim Ukin (BN–UMNO)	13,885	16%		70%	14%	9,983	71.9%	361	3.6%
N25	Klias	Azizah Mohd Dun (BN–UMNO)	5,900	61.3%	Md Tajuddin Md Walli (IND)	82	0.9%	2,413	Lajim Ukin (BN–UMNO)	13,885	16%		70%	14%	9,983	71.9%	361	3.6%
N25	Klias	Azizah Mohd Dun (BN–UMNO)	5,900	61.3%	Mat Lani Sabli (IND)	37	0.4%	2,413	Lajim Ukin (BN–UMNO)	13,885	16%		70%	14%	9,983	71.9%	361	3.6%
N26	Kuala Penyu	Teo Kwan Chin @ Teo Mau Sing (BN–UPKO)	4,416	46.6%	Johan @ Christopher O T Ghani (IND)	4,159	43.9%	257	Johan @ Christopher O T Ghani (IND)	12,903	7%		54%	39%	9,784	75.8%	306	3.1%
N26	Kuala Penyu	Teo Kwan Chin @ Teo Mau Sing (BN–UPKO)	4,416	46.6%	Guan Dee Koh Hoi (PR–PKR)	889	9.4%	257	Johan @ Christopher O T Ghani (IND)	12,903	7%		54%	39%	9,784	75.8%	306	3.1%
N27	Lumadan	Kamarlin Ombi (BN–UMNO)	5,707	69.4%	Dojit Muda (PR–PKR)	2,410	29.3%	3,297	Sarinum Sadikun (BN–UMNO)	11,317	4%		92%	6%	8,505	75.2%	276	3.3%
N27	Lumadan	Kamarlin Ombi (BN–UMNO)	5,707	69.4%	Brahim Awang Anak (IND)	107	1.3%	3,297	Sarinum Sadikun (BN–UMNO)	11,317	4%		92%	6%	8,505	75.2%	276	3.3%
N28	Sindumin	Ahmad Bujang (BN–UMNO)	5,634	60.1%	Ramle Dua (PR–PKR)	3,730	39.8%	1,904	Sapawi Amat Wasali @ Ahmad (BN–UMNO)	12,828	6%		72%	21%	9,560	74.5%	185	1.9%
N29	Kundasang	Joachim Gunsalam (BN–PBS)	3,597	54.8%	Japiril Suhaimin (IND)	1,791	27.3%	1,806	Joachim Gunsalam (BN–PBS)	9,639			27%	73%	6,780	70.3%	212	3.1%
N29	Kundasang	Joachim Gunsalam (BN–PBS)	3,597	54.8%	Karim Adam (PR–PKR)	1,180	18.0%	1,806	Joachim Gunsalam (BN–PBS)	9,639			27%	73%	6,780	70.3%	212	3.1%
N30	Karanaan	Masidi Manjun (BN–UMNO)	6,505	82.2%	Atin Naisin (PR–PKR)	1,389	17.5%	5,116	Masidi Manjun (BN–UMNO)	11,087	7%		59%	37%	8,033	72.5%	116	1.4%
N31	Paginatan	Ewon Ebin (BN–UPKO)	5,206	72.2%	Paul Kerangkas (PR–PKR)	1,749	24.3%	3,457	Ewon Ebin (BN–UPKO)	10,084			31%	67%	7,374	73.1%	164	2.2%
N31	Paginatan	Ewon Ebin (BN–UPKO)	5,206	72.2%	Johumin Ampadong (BERSEKUTU)	157	2.2%	3,457	Ewon Ebin (BN–UPKO)	10,084			31%	67%	7,374	73.1%	164	2.2%
N31	Paginatan	Ewon Ebin (BN–UPKO)	5,206	72.2%	Mat Jaili Samat (IND)	90	1.3%	3,457	Ewon Ebin (BN–UPKO)	10,084			31%	67%	7,374	73.1%	164	2.2%
N32	Tambunan	Joseph Pairin Kitingan (BN–PBS)	5,601	65.3%	Moses @ Mozes Michael Iking (PR–PKR)	2,820	32.9%	2,781	Joseph Pairin Kitingan (BN–PBS)	11,245	2%		8%	90%	8,694	77.3%	116	1.3%
N32	Tambunan	Joseph Pairin Kitingan (BN–PBS)	5,601	65.3%	Francis Koh Kui Tze (IND)	157	1.8%	2,781	Joseph Pairin Kitingan (BN–PBS)	11,245	2%		8%	90%	8,694	77.3%	116	1.3%
N33	Bingkor	Justin Guka (BN–UPKO)	4,589	49.3%	Geoffrey Gapari Kitingan (PR–PKR)	4,418	47.5%	171	Justin Guka (BN–UPKO)	13,339	14%		26%	60%	9,455	70.9%	155	1.6%
N33	Bingkor	Justin Guka (BN–UPKO)	4,589	49.3%	Uling @ Thomas Anggan (IND)	164	1.8%	171	Justin Guka (BN–UPKO)	13,339	14%		26%	60%	9,455	70.9%	155	1.6%
N33	Bingkor	Justin Guka (BN–UPKO)	4,589	49.3%	Victor Leonardus (IND)	129	1.4%	171	Justin Guka (BN–UPKO)	13,339	14%		26%	60%	9,455	70.9%	155	1.6%
N34	Liawan	Sapin @ Sairin Karano (BN–UMNO)	4,661	60.8%	Jius Awang (PR–PKR)	2,617	34.1%	2,044	Sapin @ Sairin Karno (BN–UMNO)	10,994	18%		36%	46%	7,811	71.1%	143	1.8%
N34	Liawan	Sapin @ Sairin Karano (BN–UMNO)	4,661	60.8%	Yangul @ Lawrence Mogidau @ Edau (PR–DAP)	286	3.7%	2,044	Sapin @ Sairin Karno (BN–UMNO)	10,994	18%		36%	46%	7,811	71.1%	143	1.8%
N34	Liawan	Sapin @ Sairin Karano (BN–UMNO)	4,661	60.8%	Yapilin Nawawi (IND)	104	1.4%	2,044	Sapin @ Sairin Karno (BN–UMNO)	10,994	18%		36%	46%	7,811	71.1%	143	1.8%
N35	Melalap	Radin Malleh (BN–PBS)	4,530	64.0%	Jaineh Juata @ Jimmy Jawatah (PR–PKR)	2,431	34.3%	2,099	Radin Malleh (BN–PBS)	10,276	27%		27%	46%	7,259	70.6%	176	2.4%
N35	Melalap	Radin Malleh (BN–PBS)	4,530	64.0%	Belud @ Jeffery Kumbang (BERSEKUTU)	122	1.7%	2,099	Radin Malleh (BN–PBS)	10,276	27%		27%	46%	7,259	70.6%	176	2.4%
N36	Kemabong	Rubin Balang (BN–UMNO)	5,158	62.8%	Peter @ Phillip Lunuk @ Lonok (PR–PKR)	2,721	33.1%	2,437	Rubin Balang (BN–UMNO)	10,598	8%		23%	68%	8,442	79.7%	226	2.7%
N36	Kemabong	Rubin Balang (BN–UMNO)	5,158	62.8%	Auren Tegko (BERSEKUTU)	337	4.1%	2,437	Rubin Balang (BN–UMNO)	10,598	8%		23%	68%	8,442	79.7%	226	2.7%
N37	Sook	Ellron Alfred Angin (BN–PBRS)	5,496	59.8%	Paul Bunsu Gintang @ Paul Gitang (PR–PKR)	3,365	36.6%	2,131	Joseph Kurup (BN–PBRS)	12,564	2%		14%	84%	9,250	73.6%	63	0.7%
N37	Sook	Ellron Alfred Angin (BN–PBRS)	5,496	59.8%	Suaidin @ Shuhaiddin Langkab @ Langab (IND)	202	2.2%	2,131	Joseph Kurup (BN–PBRS)	12,564	2%		14%	84%	9,250	73.6%	63	0.7%
N37	Sook	Ellron Alfred Angin (BN–PBRS)	5,496	59.8%	Sidum Manjin (BERSEKUTU)	124	1.4%	2,131	Joseph Kurup (BN–PBRS)	12,564	2%		14%	84%	9,250	73.6%	63	0.7%
N38	Nabawan	Bobbey Ah Fang Suan (BN–UPKO)	3,414	70.6%	Gabriel Uwing Agunsung (PR–PKR)	1,327	27.4%	2,087	Bobbey Ah Fang Suan (BN–UPKO)	7,148			9%	90%	4,891	68.4%	54	1.1%
N38	Nabawan	Bobbey Ah Fang Suan (BN–UPKO)	3,414	70.6%	Alexsius Mangka (BERSEKUTU)	96	2.0%	2,087	Bobbey Ah Fang Suan (BN–UPKO)	7,148			9%	90%	4,891	68.4%	54	1.1%
N39	Sugut	Surady Kayong (BN–UMNO)	3,123	73.2%	Raidin Rumantai (PR–PKR)	588	13.8%	2,535	Surady Kayong (BN–UMNO)	7,784			61%	38%	4,503	57.9%	237	5.3%
N39	Sugut	Surady Kayong (BN–UMNO)	3,123	73.2%	Basran Omar (IND)	363	8.5%	2,535	Surady Kayong (BN–UMNO)	7,784			61%	38%	4,503	57.9%	237	5.3%
N39	Sugut	Surady Kayong (BN–UMNO)	3,123	73.2%	Janid Bobonong (IND)	111	2.6%	2,535	Surady Kayong (BN–UMNO)	7,784			61%	38%	4,503	57.9%	237	5.3%
N39	Sugut	Surady Kayong (BN–UMNO)	3,123	73.2%	Nordin Kaning (IND)	73	1.7%	2,535	Surady Kayong (BN–UMNO)	7,784			61%	38%	4,503	57.9%	237	5.3%
N40	Labuk	Metah @ Micheal Asang (BN–PBS)	6,178	80.3%	Sipin Kadandi (PR–PKR)	723	9.4%	5,455	Metah @ Micheal Asang (BN–PBS)	11,397		2%	61%	37%	7,855	68.9%	161	2.1%
N40	Labuk	Metah @ Micheal Asang (BN–PBS)	6,178	80.3%	Mervin Enti (IND)	657	8.5%	5,455	Metah @ Micheal Asang (BN–PBS)	11,397		2%	61%	37%	7,855	68.9%	161	2.1%
N40	Labuk	Metah @ Micheal Asang (BN–PBS)	6,178	80.3%	Yusof Apok @ Joseph Apok (IND)	107	1.4%	5,455	Metah @ Micheal Asang (BN–PBS)	11,397		2%	61%	37%	7,855	68.9%	161	2.1%
N41	Gum-Gum	Zakaria Mohd Edris @ Tubau (BN–UMNO)	0		Unopposed	0		0	Zakaria Mohd Edris @ Tubau (BN–UMNO)	9,993	24%		68%	8%				
N42	Sungai Sibuga	Musa Aman (BN–UMNO)	10,570	75.1%	Ahmad Thamrin @ Tamrin Mohd Jaini (PR–PKR)	2,913	20.7%	7,657	Musa Aman (BN–UMNO)	21,442	23%		74%	3%	14,494	67.6%	425	2.9%
N42	Sungai Sibuga	Musa Aman (BN–UMNO)	10,570	75.1%	Gusniah Diong (IND)	295	2.1%	7,657	Musa Aman (BN–UMNO)	21,442	23%		74%	3%	14,494	67.6%	425	2.9%
N42	Sungai Sibuga	Musa Aman (BN–UMNO)	10,570	75.1%	Osman Enting (BERSEKUTU)	291	2.1%	7,657	Musa Aman (BN–UMNO)	21,442	23%		74%	3%	14,494	67.6%	425	2.9%
N43	Sekong	Samsudin Yahya (BN–UMNO)	4,271	64.8%	Nahalan Damsal (PR–PKR)	2,082	31.6%	2,189	Samsudin Yahya (BN–UMNO)	11,308	17%		81%	2%	6,876	60.8%	281	4.1%
N43	Sekong	Samsudin Yahya (BN–UMNO)	4,271	64.8%	Mansor Mursalin (BERSEKUTU)	242	3.7%	2,189	Samsudin Yahya (BN–UMNO)	11,308	17%		81%	2%	6,876	60.8%	281	4.1%
N44	Karamunting	Peter Pang En Yin (BN–LDP)	5,171	56.0%	Chok Kon Tack (PR–DAP)	1,809	19.6%	3,362	Wong Lien Tat (BN–LDP)	14,696	53%		44%	2%	9,513	64.7%	271	2.9%
N44	Karamunting	Peter Pang En Yin (BN–LDP)	5,171	56.0%	Sak Cheong Yu (IND)	1,455	15.7%	3,362	Wong Lien Tat (BN–LDP)	14,696	53%		44%	2%	9,513	64.7%	271	2.9%
N44	Karamunting	Peter Pang En Yin (BN–LDP)	5,171	56.0%	Tan Shu Tee (PR–PKR)	452	4.9%	3,362	Wong Lien Tat (BN–LDP)	14,696	53%		44%	2%	9,513	64.7%	271	2.9%
N45	Elopura	Au Kam Wah (BN–SAPP)	7,919	75.2%	Samuel Pang Chen Miew (PR–PKR)	2,510	23.8%	5,409	Au Kam Yah (BN–SAPP)	18,363	60%		34%	6%	10,865	59.2%	338	3.1%
N46	Tanjong Papat	Raymond Tan Shu Kiah (BN–SAPP)	6,418	72.0%	Teo Yan Boon @ Anthony (PR–DAP)	2,492	28.0%	3,926	Raymond Tan Shu Kiah (BN–SAPP)	14,484	61%		36%	3%	9,183	63.4%	273	3.0%
N47	Kuamut	Masiung Banah (BN–UPKO)	3,784	51.4%	Mustapa Datu Tambuyong (IND)	2,112	28.7%	1,672	Johnny @ Juni Intang (BN–UPKO)	11,389			89%	9%	7,668	67.3%	300	3.9%
N47	Kuamut	Masiung Banah (BN–UPKO)	3,784	51.4%	Abdul Razak Jamil (PR–PKR)	1,143	15.5%	1,672	Johnny @ Juni Intang (BN–UPKO)	11,389			89%	9%	7,668	67.3%	300	3.9%
N47	Kuamut	Masiung Banah (BN–UPKO)	3,784	51.4%	Duin Bintarang @ Noor Bintarang (IND)	206	2.8%	1,672	Johnny @ Juni Intang (BN–UPKO)	11,389			89%	9%	7,668	67.3%	300	3.9%
N47	Kuamut	Masiung Banah (BN–UPKO)	3,784	51.4%	Jusing @ Geoffrey Sabran (PR–DAP)	105	1.4%	1,672	Johnny @ Juni Intang (BN–UPKO)	11,389			89%	9%	7,668	67.3%	300	3.9%
N48	Sukau	Saddi Abdu Rahman (BN–UMNO)	3,278	68.1%	Ahdah Sulaiman (IND)	1,171	24.3%	2,107	Aklee Abass (BN–UMNO)	8,165			96%	2%	5,139	62.9%	324	6.3%
N48	Sukau	Saddi Abdu Rahman (BN–UMNO)	3,278	68.1%	Jakariah Janit (IND)	86	1.8%	2,107	Aklee Abass (BN–UMNO)	8,165			96%	2%	5,139	62.9%	324	6.3%
N48	Sukau	Saddi Abdu Rahman (BN–UMNO)	3,278	68.1%	Awang @ Pg Roslan (BERSEKUTU)	85	1.8%	2,107	Aklee Abass (BN–UMNO)	8,165			96%	2%	5,139	62.9%	324	6.3%
N48	Sukau	Saddi Abdu Rahman (BN–UMNO)	3,278	68.1%	Imran Ibrahim (PR–PAS)	76	1.6%	2,107	Aklee Abass (BN–UMNO)	8,165			96%	2%	5,139	62.9%	324	6.3%
N48	Sukau	Saddi Abdu Rahman (BN–UMNO)	3,278	68.1%	Jahran Gani (IND)	57	1.2%	2,107	Aklee Abass (BN–UMNO)	8,165			96%	2%	5,139	62.9%	324	6.3%
N48	Sukau	Saddi Abdu Rahman (BN–UMNO)	3,278	68.1%	Abdulgani Kosui (IND)	41	0.9%	2,107	Aklee Abass (BN–UMNO)	8,165			96%	2%	5,139	62.9%	324	6.3%
N48	Sukau	Saddi Abdu Rahman (BN–UMNO)	3,278	68.1%	Yusof Nasir (IND)	19	0.4%	2,107	Aklee Abass (BN–UMNO)	8,165			96%	2%	5,139	62.9%	324	6.3%
N49	Tungku	Mohd Suhaili Said (BN–UMNO)	4,828	64.9%	Jamal Sulai (PR–PKR)	2,446	32.9%	2,382	Mohd Suhaili Said (BN–UMNO)	12,246	13%		70%	17%	7,713	63.0%	271	3.5%
N49	Tungku	Mohd Suhaili Said (BN–UMNO)	4,828	64.9%	Abdul Raja Abdul Mohamad (IND)	164	2.2%	2,382	Mohd Suhaili Said (BN–UMNO)	12,246	13%		70%	17%	7,713	63.0%	271	3.5%
N50	Lahad Datu	Nasrun Mansur (BN–UMNO)	8,034	61.2%	Zainuddin Zulkarnain (PR–PKR)	4,976	37.9%	3,058	Nasrun Mansur (BN–UMNO)	21,548	20%		69%	11%	13,557	62.9%	428	3.2%
N51	Kunak	Nilwan Kabang (BN–UMNO)	5,083	83.9%	Bedu Kudusa (PR-PKR)	968	16.0%	4,115	Jasa Rauddah (BN–UMNO)	9,694	5%		84%	10%	6,283	64.8%	225	3.6%
N52	Sulabayan	Harman Mohamad (BN–UMNO)	4,501	62.9%	Mohd Abdul Wahab Pg Abdullah (PR–PKR)	2,464	34.5%	2,037	Mohd Lan Allani (BN–UMNO)	11,291			96%	4%	7,540	66.8%	389	5.2%
N53	Senallang	Nasir Sakaran (BN–UMNO)	6,083	82.4%	Asmara Asmad (IND)	651	8.8%	5,432	Nasir Sakaran (BN–UMNO)	12,198	6%		93%	2%	7,753	63.6%	366	4.7%
N53	Senallang	Nasir Sakaran (BN–UMNO)	6,083	82.4%	Hasaman Sagaran (PR–PKR)	628	8.5%	5,432	Nasir Sakaran (BN–UMNO)	12,198	6%		93%	2%	7,753	63.6%	366	4.7%
N53	Senallang	Nasir Sakaran (BN–UMNO)	6,083	82.4%	Mohd Sayadi Bakal (IND)	0	0.0%	5,432	Nasir Sakaran (BN–UMNO)	12,198	6%		93%	2%	7,753	63.6%	366	4.7%
N54	Bugaya	Ramlee Marhaban (BN–UMNO)	0		Unopposed	0		0	Basali Tarireh @ Basalie Ab Hamid (BN–UMNO)	11,727			90%	9%				
N55	Balung	Syed Abas Syed Ali (BN–UMNO)	5,160	78.3%	Mohd Abdillah Timbasal (PR–PKR)	1,423	21.6%	3,737	Syed Abas Syed Ali (BN–UMNO)	10,248	9%		81%	9%	6,779	66.2%	188	2.8%
N56	Apas	Tawfiq Abu Bakar Titingan (BN–UMNO)	5,409	74.2%	Vun Kon Pau @ Henry Vun (PR–PKR)	1,801	24.7%	3,608	Tawfiq Abu Bakar Titingan (BN–UMNO)	12,006	24%		72%	3%	7,486	62.4%	193	2.6%
N56	Apas	Tawfiq Abu Bakar Titingan (BN–UMNO)	5,409	74.2%	Ardi Arsah @ Samsi (IND)	77	1.1%	3,608	Tawfiq Abu Bakar Titingan (BN–UMNO)	12,006	24%		72%	3%	7,486	62.4%	193	2.6%
N57	Sri Tanjong	Jimmy Wong Sze Phin (PR–DAP)	5,359	42.3%	Samson Chin Chee Tsu (BN–PBS)	4,187	33.1%	1,172	Samson Chin Chee Tsu (BN–PBS)	20,306	74%		23%	3%	12,807	63.1%	146	1.1%
N57	Sri Tanjong	Jimmy Wong Sze Phin (PR–DAP)	5,359	42.3%	Kong Hong Ming @ Kong Fo Min (PR–PKR)	3,090	24.4%	1,172	Samson Chin Chee Tsu (BN–PBS)	20,306	74%		23%	3%	12,807	63.1%	146	1.1%
N58	Merotai	Pang Yuk Ming (BN–SAPP)	3,723	42.7%	Soon Ten Fook (IND)	3,481	40.0%	242	Liew Yun Fah (BN–LDP)	13,931	24%		67%	8%	8,777	63.0%	67	0.8%
N58	Merotai	Pang Yuk Ming (BN–SAPP)	3,723	42.7%	Mohamad Tingka (PR–PAS)	931	10.7%	242	Liew Yun Fah (BN–LDP)	13,931	24%		67%	8%	8,777	63.0%	67	0.8%
N58	Merotai	Pang Yuk Ming (BN–SAPP)	3,723	42.7%	Moktar Ahmad (IND)	289	3.3%	242	Liew Yun Fah (BN–LDP)	13,931	24%		67%	8%	8,777	63.0%	67	0.8%
N58	Merotai	Pang Yuk Ming (BN–SAPP)	3,723	42.7%	Salman Nurillah (IND)	286	3.3%	242	Liew Yun Fah (BN–LDP)	13,931	24%		67%	8%	8,777	63.0%	67	0.8%
N59	Tanjong Batu	Hamisa Samat (BN–UMNO)	5,921	77.9%	Dullah Hashim (PR–PKR)	1,499	19.7%	4,422	Md Kamil Mohd Kassim (BN–UMNO)	12,577	4%		88%	6%	7,690	61.1%	92	1.2%
N59	Tanjong Batu	Hamisa Samat (BN–UMNO)	5,921	77.9%	Mohammad Jeffery Rosman (IND)	178	2.3%	4,422	Md Kamil Mohd Kassim (BN–UMNO)	12,577	4%		88%	6%	7,690	61.1%	92	1.2%
N59	Tanjong Batu	Hamisa Samat (BN–UMNO)	5,921	77.9%	Dasun Sumbin (IND)	0	0.0%	4,422	Md Kamil Mohd Kassim (BN–UMNO)	12,577	4%		88%	6%	7,690	61.1%	92	1.2%
N60	Sebatik	Abdul Muis Picho (BN–UMNO)	4,711	76.4%	Arsad Jamal (PR–PKR)	880	14.3%	3,831	Patawari Patawe (BN–UMNO)	9,510	9%		81%	9%	6,277	66.0%	110	1.8%
N60	Sebatik	Abdul Muis Picho (BN–UMNO)	4,711	76.4%	Raden Kakung (IND)	392	6.4%	3,831	Patawari Patawe (BN–UMNO)	9,510	9%		81%	9%	6,277	66.0%	110	1.8%
