= List of Malaysian State Assembly Representatives (2008–2013) =

Subnational legislature representatives

List of Malaysian State Assembly Representatives (2004–2008)
List of Malaysian State Assembly Representatives (2008–2013)
List of Malaysian State Assembly Representatives (2013–2018)

The following are the members of the Dewan Undangan Negeri or state assemblies, elected in the 2008 state election and by-elections. Also included is the list of the Sarawak state assembly members who were elected in 2011.

== Composition ==
Equal-area representation of state constituencies as elected in 2008

Beginning of the State Legislative Assembly March / April 2008
State legislative assemblies	# of seats	Simple majority	BN seats	PAS seats	DAP seats	PKR seats	Ind seats
Perlis	15	8	14	1	0	0	0
Kedah	36	19	14	16	1	4	1
Kelantan	45	23	6	38	0	1	0
Terengganu	32	17	24	8	0	0	0
Penang	40	21	11	1	19	9	0
Perak	59	30	28	6	18	7	0
Pahang	42	22	37	2	2	0	1
Selangor	56	29	20	8	13	15	0
Negeri Sembilan	36	19	21	1	10	4	0
Malacca	28	15	23	0	5	0	0
Johor	56	29	50	2	4	0	0
Sabah	60	31	59	0	1	0	0
Total	505		307	83	73	40	2

Beginning of the State Legislative Assembly March / April 2008
State legislative assemblies	# of seats	Simple majority	BN seats	PR / IND seats (informal)
Perlis	15	8	14	1
Kedah	36	19	14	22
Kelantan	45	23	6	39
Terengganu	32	17	24	8
Penang	40	21	11	29
Perak	59	30	28	31
Pahang	42	22	37	5
Selangor	56	29	20	36
Negeri Sembilan	36	19	21	15
Malacca	28	15	23	5
Johor	56	29	50	6
Sabah	60	31	59	1
Total	505		307	198

State legislative seat changes since the elections in 2008 (except Sarawak) and 2011 are highlighted for clarity

Dissolution of the State Legislative Assembly March / April 2013
State legislative assemblies	# of seats	Simple majority	BN seats	PAS seats	DAP seats	PKR seats	SAPP seats	PSM seats	SWP seats	IND seats	VAC seats
Perlis	15	8	13	2	0	0	0	0	0	0	0
Kedah	36	19	13	16	1	3	0	0	0	2	1
Kelantan	45	23	7	37	0	1	0	0	0	0	0
Terengganu	32	17	24	8	0	0	0	0	0	0	0
Penang	40	29	11	1	19	9	0	0	0	0	0
Perak	59	30	29	6	16	5	0	0	0	3	0
Pahang	42	22	37	2	2	0	0	0	0	0	1
Selangor	56	29	21	7	12	13	0	1	0	1	1
Negeri Sembilan	36	19	20	1	10	4	0	0	0	0	1
Malacca	28	15	22	0	5	0	0	0	0	0	1
Johor	56	29	50	2	4	0	0	0	0	0	0
Sabah	60	31	57	0	1	0	2	0	0	0	0
Sarawak	71	36	54	0	12	3	0	0	1	1	0
Total	576		358	82	82	38	2	1	1	6	5

Dissolution of the State Legislative Assembly March / April 2013
State legislative assemblies	# of seats	Simple majority	BN seats	PR / PSM seats (informal)	IND seats	Others seats
Perlis	15	8	13	2	0	0
Kedah	36	19	13	20	2	1 List: Vacant seat (1)
Kelantan	45	23	7	38	0	0
Terengganu	32	17	24	8	0	0
Penang	40	21	11	29	0	0
Perak	59	30	29	27	3	0
Pahang	42	22	37	4	0	1 List: Vacant seat (1)
Selangor	56	29	21	33	1	1 List: Vacant seat (1)
Negeri Sembilan	36	19	20	15	0	1 List: Vacant seat (1)
Malacca	28	15	22	5	0	1 List: Vacant seat (1)
Johor	56	29	50	6	0	0
Sabah	60	31	57	1	0	2 List: Sabah Progressive Party (2)
Sarawak	71	36	54	15	1	1 List: Sarawak Workers Party (1)
Total	576		358	203	7	8

== Perlis ==
No.	State Constituency	Member	Party
BN 13 | PAS 2
N01	Titi Tinggi	Yip Sun Onn	BN (MCA)
N02	Beseri	Md Rawi Kassim	BN (UMNO)
N03	Chuping	Mansor Jusoh	BN (UMNO)
N04	Mata Ayer	Khairi Hasan	BN (UMNO)
N05	Santan	Sabry Ahmad	BN (UMNO)
N06	Bintong	Md Isa Sabu	BN (UMNO)
N07	Sena	Abdul Jamil Saad	BN (UMNO)
N08	Indera Kayangan	Por Choo Chor	BN (MCA)
N09	Kuala Perlis	Mat Hassan	BN (UMNO)
N10	Kayang	Ahmad Bakri Ali	BN (UMNO)
N11	Pauh	Syed Razlan Syed Putra Jamalullail	BN (UMNO)
N12	Tambun Tulang	Shahidan Kassim	BN (UMNO)
N13	Guar Sanji	Jafperi Othman	BN (UMNO)
N14	Simpang Empat	Rus'sele Eizan	PR (PAS)
N15	Sanglang	Hashim Jasin declared won by the Federal Court on 16 September 2008	PR (PAS)

== Kedah ==
12th Kedah State Legislative Assembly
←	11th Assembly	13th Assembly	→

Overview
- Legislative body: Kedah State Legislative Assembly
- Jurisdiction: Kedah
- Meeting place: Wisma Darul Aman, Alor Setar
- Term: 5 May 2008 – 28 March 2013
- Election: 2008 state election
- Government: Kedah State Executive Council
- Website: mmk.kedah.gov.my
- Members: 36
- Speaker: Abd Isa Ismail
- Deputy Speaker: Ahmad ‘Izzat Mohamad Shauki
- Menteri Besar: Azizan Abdul Razak
- Opposition Leader: Mahdzir Khalid
- Party control: Pakatan Rakyat

Sovereign
- Sultan: Sultan Abdul Halim Mu’adzam Shah

=== Elected members ===
No.	State Constituency	Member	Party
PAS 16 | BN 13 | PKR 3 | DAP 1 | IND 2 | VAC 1
N01	Ayer Hangat	Mohd Rawi Abdul Hamid	BN (UMNO)
N02	Kuah	Nawawi Ahmad	BN (UMNO)
N03	Kota Siputeh	Abu Hasan Sarif	BN (UMNO)
N04	Ayer Hitam	Abd Ghani Ahmad (EXCO Member)	PR (PAS)
N05	Bukit Kayu Hitam	Ahmad Zaini Japar	BN (UMNO)
N06	Jitra	Saad Man	BN (UMNO)
N07	Kuala Nerang	Vacant since 4 April 2012 (Note: Barisan Nasional assemblyman Syed Sobri Syed Hashim from UMNO won the seat in the general elections in 2008; however was officially declared bankrupt by Malaysian Insolvency Department on 4 April 2012, thus automatically leaving the seat vacant. No by-elections were held due to his bankruptcy.)	VAC
N07	Kuala Nerang	Syed Sobri Syed Hashim until 4 April 2012	BN (UMNO)
N08	Pedu	Mahdzir Khalid (Opposition Leader)	BN (UMNO)
N09	Bukit Lada	Ahmad 'Izzat Mohamad Shauki (Deputy Speaker)	PR (PAS)
N10	Bukit Pinang	Md Rohsidi Osman	PR (PAS)
N11	Derga	Cheah Soon Hai	BN (Gerakan)
N12	Bakar Bata	Ahmad Bashah Md Hanipah	BN (UMNO)
N13	Kota Darul Aman	Lee Guan Aik	PR (DAP)
N14	Alor Mengkudu	Ismail Salleh (EXCO Member)	PR (PAS)
N15	Anak Bukit	Amiruddin Hamzah (EXCO Member)	PR (PAS)
N16	Kubang Rotan	Mohd Nasir Mustafa	PR (PAS)
N17	Pengkalan Kundor	Phahrolrazi Zawawi (EXCO Member)	PR (PAS)
N18	Tokai	Mohamed Taulan Rasul (EXCO Member)	PR (PAS)
N19	Sungai Tiang	Suraya Yaacob	BN (UMNO)
N20	Sungai Limau	Azizan Abdul Razak (Menteri Besar)	PR (PAS)
N21	Guar Chempedak	Ku Abdul Rahman Ku Ismail	BN (UMNO)
N22	Gurun	Leong Yong Kong	BN (MCA)
N23	Belantek	Mohd Tajudin Abdullah	BN (UMNO)
N24	Jeneri	Yahya Abdullah	PR (PAS)
N25	Bukit Selambau	Manikumar Subramaniam from 7 April 2009 (Note: Manikumar was elected as a Pakatan Rakyat assemblyman in the by-election on 7 April 2009 following the resignation of Arumugam Vengatarakoo from PKR.) (EXCO Member)	PR (PKR)
N25	Bukit Selambau	Arumugam Vengatarakoo until 8 February 2009	PR (PKR)
N26	Tanjong Dawai	Hamdan Mohamed Khalib (EXCO Member)	PR (PAS)
N27	Pantai Merdeka	Abdullah Jusoh	PR (PAS)
N28	Bakar Arang	Tan Wei Shu (Note: Tan Wei Shu was elected as a Pakatan Rakyat assemblyman in the general elections in 2008, resigned from PKR on 15 April 2010 and became an independent.)	IND
N29	Sidam	Tan Joon Long @ Tan Chow Kang (EXCO Member)	PR (PKR)
N30	Bayu	Azmi Che Husain	BN (UMNO)
N31	Kupang	Johari Abdullah	PR (PAS)
N32	Kuala Ketil	Md Zuki Yusof	PR (PAS)
N33	Merbau Pulas	Siti Aishah Ghazali (EXCO Member)	PR (PAS)
N34	Lunas	Mohd Razhi Salleh (Note: Mohd Razhi Salleh was elected as a Pakatan Rakyat assemblyman in the general elections in 2008, resigned from PKR on 23 August 2009 and became an independent.)	IND
N35	Kulim	Lim Soo Nee (EXCO Member)	PR (PKR)
N36	Bandar Baharu	Yaakub Hussin	PR (PAS)

=== Seating arrangement ===
Vacant	Vacant	Vacant	Vacant		Vacant	N13 Kota Darul Aman	N36 Bandar Baharu	N32 Kuala Ketil
Vacant	Vacant	Vacant	Vacant		N16 Kubang Rotan	N27 Pantai Merdeka	N24 Jeneri	N31 Kupang
	N28 Bakar Arang	N06 Jitra	N07 Kuala Nerang (Vacant)		N35 Kulim (EXCO Member)	N25 Bukit Selambau (EXCO Member)	N10 Bukit Pinang
		N05 Bukit Kayu Hitam	C		B	N14 Alor Mengkudu (EXCO Member)
	N34 Lunas	N01 Ayer Hangat	D	Sergeant-at-Arm	A	N33 Merbau Pulas (EXCO Member)	N09 Bukit Lada (Deputy Speaker)
	N30 Bayu	N19 Sungai Tiang	D		A	N26 Tanjong Dawai (EXCO Member)	N04 Ayer Hitam (EXCO Member)
	N23 Belantek	N03 Kota Siputeh	D	the Mace	A	N15 Anak Bukit (EXCO Member)	N24 Sidam (EXCO Member)
	N22 Gurun	N02 Kuah	D	the Mace	A	N17 Pengkalan Kundor (EXCO Member)	State Financial Officer
	N21 Guar Chempedak	N12 Bakar Bata	D		A	N18 Tokai (EXCO Member)	State Legal Advisor
	N11 Derga	N08 Pedu (Opposition Leader)	D	Secretary	A	N20 Sungai Limau (Menteri Besar)	State Secretary
				Speaker
				Sultan

== Kelantan ==
No.	State Constituency	Member	Party
PAS 37 | BN 7 | PKR 1
N01	Pengkalan Kubor	Noor Zahidi Omar	BN (UMNO)
N02	Kelaboran	Mohamad Zaki Ibrahim	PR (PAS)
N03	Pasir Pekan	Ahmad Yakob	PR (PAS)
N04	Wakaf Bharu	Che Abdullah Mat Nawi	PR (PAS)
N05	Kijang	Wan Ubaidah Omar	PR (PAS)
N06	Chempaka	Nik Abdul Aziz Nik Mat	PR (PAS)
N07	Panchor	Nik Mohd. Amar Nik Abdullah	PR (PAS)
N08	Tanjong Mas	Rohani Ibrahim	PR (PAS)
N09	Kota Lama	Anuar Tan Abdullah	PR (PAS)
N10	Bunut Payong	Takiyuddin Hassan	PR (PAS)
N11	Tendong	Muhammad Md Daud	PR (PAS)
N12	Pengkalan Pasir	Hanifa Ahmad	PR (PAS)
N13	Chetok	Abdul Halim Abdul Rahman	PR (PAS)
N14	Meranti	Mohd. Nassuruddin Daud	PR (PAS)
N15	Gual Periok	Mohamad Awang	PR (PAS)
N16	Bukit Tuku	Abdul Fatah Harun	PR (PAS)
N17	Salor	Husam Musa	PR (PAS)
N18	Pasir Tumboh	Ahmad Baihaki Atiqullah	PR (PAS)
N19	Demit	Muhamad Mustafa	PR (PAS)
N20	Tawang	Hassan Mohamood	PR (PAS)
N21	Perupok	Omar Mohammed	PR (PAS)
N22	Jelawat	Abdul Azziz Kadir	PR (PAS)
N23	Melor	Wan Ismail Wan Jusoh	PR (PAS)
N24	Kadok	Azami Md. Nor	PR (PAS)
N25	Kok Lanas	Md Alwi Che Ahmad	BN (UMNO)
N26	Bukit Panau	Abdul Fattah Mahmood	PR (PAS)
N27	Gual Ipoh	Wan Yusoff Wan Mustafa	PR (PAS)
N28	Kemahang	Md Anizam Ab Rahman	PR (PAS)
N29	Selising	Saipul Bahrin Mohamad	PR (PAS)
N30	Limbongan	Zainuddin Awang Hamat	PR (PAS)
N31	Semerak	Wan Hassan Wan Ibrahim	PR (PAS)
N32	Gaal	Nik Mazian Nik Mohamad	PR (PAS)
N33	Pulai Chondong	Zulkifli Mamat	PR (PAS)
N34	Temangan	Mohamed Fadzli Hassan	PR (PAS)
N35	Kemuning	Wan Ahmad Lutfi Wan Sulaiman	PR (PAS)
N36	Bukit Bunga	Mohd Adhan Kechik	BN (UMNO)
N37	Air Lanas	Abdullah Ya'kub	PR (PAS)
N38	Kuala Balah	Abd Aziz Derashid	BN (UMNO)
N39	Mengkebang	Abdul Latiff Abdul Rahman	PR (PAS)
N40	Guchil	Tuan Zamri Ariff Tuan Zakaria	PR (PKR)
N41	Manek Urai	Mohd Fauzi Abdullah from 14 July 2009 (Note: Mohd Fauzi Abdullah was elected as a Pakatan Rakyat assemblyman in a by-election on 14 July 2009 following the death of assemblyman Ismail Yaacob.)	PR (PAS)
N41	Manek Urai	Ismail Yaacob until 22 May 2009	PR (PAS)
N42	Dabong	Arifabillah Mohd Asri Ibrahim	PR (PAS)
N43	Nenggiri	Mat Yusoff Abd Ghani	BN (UMNO)
N44	Paloh	Nozula Mat Diah	BN (UMNO)
N45	Galas	Ab Aziz Yusoff from 4 November 2010 (Note: Ab Aziz Yusoff was elected as a Barisan Nasional assemblyman in the by-election on 4 November 2010 following the death of assemblyman Che Hashim Sulaiman.)	BN (UMNO)
N45	Galas	Che Hashim Sulaiman until 27 September 2010	PR (PAS)

== Terengganu ==
No.	State Constituency	Member	Party
BN 24 | PAS 8
N01	Kuala Besut	A. Rahman Mokhtar	BN (UMNO)
N02	Kota Putera	Muhammad Pehimi Yusof	BN (UMNO)
N03	Jertih	Idris Jusoh	BN (UMNO)
N04	Hulu Besut	Nawi Mohamad	BN (UMNO)
N05	Jabi	Ramlan Ali	BN (UMNO)
N06	Permaisuri	Abd Halim Jusoh	BN (UMNO)
N07	Langkap	Asha'ari Idris	BN (UMNO)
N08	Batu Rakit	Khazan Che Mat	BN (UMNO)
N09	Tepuh	Muhammad Ramli Nuh	BN (UMNO)
N10	Teluk Pasu	Abdul Rahin Mohd Said	BN (UMNO)
N11	Seberang Takir	Ahmad Razif Abd Rahman	BN (UMNO)
N12	Bukit Tunggal	Alias Razak	PR (PAS)
N13	Wakaf Mempelam	Mohd Abdul Wahid Endut	PR (PAS)
N14	Bandar	Toh Chin Yaw	BN (MCA)
N15	Ladang	Tengku Hassan Tengku Omar	PR (PAS)
N16	Batu Buruk	Syed Azman Syed Ahmad Nawawi	PR (PAS)
N17	Alur Limbat	Alias Abdullah	BN (UMNO)
N18	Bukit Payung	Mohd Nor Hamzah	PR (PAS)
N19	Ru Rendang	Abdul Hadi Awang	PR (PAS)
N20	Pengkalan Berangan	Yahya Khatib Mohamad	BN (UMNO)
N21	Telemung	Rozi Mamat	BN (UMNO)
N22	Manir	Harun Taib	PR (PAS)
N23	Kuala Berang	Mohamad Zawawi Ismail	BN (UMNO)
N24	Ajil	Rosol Wahid	BN (UMNO)
N25	Bukit Besi	Din Adam	BN (UMNO)
N26	Rantau Abang	Za'abar Mohd Adib	BN (UMNO)
N27	Sura	Wan Hassan Mohd Ramli	PR (PAS)
N28	Paka	Mohd Ariffin Abdullah	BN (UMNO)
N29	Kemasik	Rosli Othman	BN (UMNO)
N30	Kijal	Ahmad Said	BN (UMNO)
N31	Cukai	Mohamed Awang Tera	BN (UMNO)
N32	Air Putih	Wan Ahmad Nizam Wan Abdul Hamid	BN (UMNO)

== Penang ==
No.	State Constituency	Member	Party
DAP 19 | BN 11 | PKR 9 | PAS 1
N01	Penaga	Azhar Ibrahim	BN (UMNO)
N02	Bertam	Zabariah Abdul Wahab	BN (UMNO)
N03	Pinang Tunggal	Roslan Saidin	BN (UMNO)
N04	Permatang Berangan	Shabudin Yahaya	BN (UMNO)
N05	Sungai Dua	Jasmin Mohamed	BN (UMNO)
N06	Telok Ayer Tawar	Jahara Hamid	BN (UMNO)
N07	Sungai Puyu	Phee Boon Poh	PR (DAP)
N08	Bagan Jermal	Lim Hock Seng	PR (DAP)
N09	Bagan Dalam	Tanasekharan Autherapady	PR (DAP)
N10	Seberang Jaya	Arif Shah Omar Shah	BN (UMNO)
N11	Permatang Pasir	Mohd Salleh Man from 25 August 2009 (Note: Mohd Salleh Man was elected as a Pakatan Rakyat assemblyman in the by-election on 25 August 2009 following the death of assemblyman Mohd Hamdan Abdul Rahman.)	PR (PAS)
N11	Permatang Pasir	Mohd Hamdan Abdul Rahman until 31 July 2009	PR (PAS)
N12	Penanti	Mansor Othman from 31 May 2009 (Note: Mansor Othman was elected as a Pakatan Rakyat assemblymen on 31 May 2009 in a by-election following the resignation of assemblyman Mohammad Fairus Khairuddin.)	PR (PKR)
N12	Penanti	Mohammad Fairus Khairuddin until 19 March 2009	PR (PKR)
N13	Berapit	Ong Kok Fooi	PR (DAP)
N14	Machang Bubok	Tan Hock Leong	PR (PKR)
N15	Padang Lalang	Tan Cheong Heng	PR (DAP)
N16	Perai	Ramasamy Palanisamy	PR (DAP)
N17	Bukit Tengah	Ong Chin Wen	PR (PKR)
N18	Bukit Tambun	Law Choo Kiang	PR (PKR)
N19	Jawi	Tan Beng Huat	PR (DAP)
N20	Sungai Bakap	Maktar Shapee	PR (PKR)
N21	Sungai Acheh	Mahmud Zakaria	BN (UMNO)
N22	Tanjong Bunga	Teh Yee Cheu	PR (DAP)
N23	Air Puteh	Lim Guan Eng	PR (DAP)
N24	Kebun Bunga	Jason Ong Khan Lee	PR (PKR)
N25	Pulau Tikus	Koay Teng Hai	PR (DAP)
N26	Padang Kota	Chow Kon Yeow	PR (DAP)
N27	Pengkalan Kota	Lau Keng Ee	PR (DAP)
N28	Komtar	Ng Wei Aik	PR (DAP)
N29	Datok Keramat	Jagdeep Singh Deo	PR (DAP)
N30	Sungai Pinang	Koid Teng Guan	PR (DAP)
N31	Batu Lancang	Law Heng Kiang	PR (DAP)
N32	Seri Delima	Sanisvara Nethaji Rayer Rajaji Rayer	PR (DAP)
N33	Air Itam	Wong Hon Wai	PR (DAP)
N34	Paya Terubong	Yeoh Soon Hin	PR (DAP)
N35	Batu Uban	Raveenthran Subramaniam	PR (PKR)
N36	Pantai Jerejak	Sim Tze Tzin	PR (PKR)
N37	Batu Maung	Abdul Malik Abul Kassim	PR (PKR)
N38	Bayan Lepas	Syed Amerruddin Syed Ahmad	BN (UMNO)
N39	Pulau Betong	Muhammad Farid Saad	BN (UMNO)
N40	Telok Bahang	Hilmi Yahaya	BN (UMNO)

== Perak ==
No.	State Constituency	Member	Party
BN 29 | DAP 16 | PAS 6 | PKR 5 | IND 3
N01	Pengkalan Hulu	Tajol Rosli Mohd Ghazali	BN (UMNO)
N02	Temengor	Hasbullah Osman	BN (UMNO)
N03	Kenering	Mohd Tarmizi Idris	BN (UMNO)
N04	Kota Tampan	Saarani Mohamad	BN (UMNO)
N05	Selama	Mohamad Daud Mohd Yusoff	BN (UMNO)
N06	Kubu Gajah	Raja Ahmad Zainuddin Raja Omar	BN (UMNO)
N07	Batu Kurau	Mohd Najmuddin Elias	BN (UMNO)
N08	Titi Serong	Khalil Idham Lim Abdullah	PR (PAS)
N09	Kuala Kurau	Abdul Yunus Jamhari	PR (PKR)
N10	Alor Pongsu	Sham Mat Sahat	BN (UMNO)
N11	Gunong Semanggol	Ramli Tusin	PR (PAS)
N12	Selinsing	Husin Din	PR (PAS)
N13	Kuala Sapetang	Tai Sing Ng	PR (PKR)
N14	Changkat Jering	Mohd Osman Mohd Jailu (Note: Osman Mohd Jailu was elected as a Pakatan Rakyat assemblyman in the general elections in 2008, resigned from PKR in February 2009 and became an independent.)	IND
N15	Trong	Rosli Husin	BN (UMNO)
N16	Kamunting	Mohamad Zahir Abdul Khalid	BN (UMNO)
N17	Pokok Assam	Yee Seu Kai	PR (DAP)
N18	Aulong	Yew Tian Hoe	PR (DAP)
N19	Chenderoh	Siti Salmah Mat Jusak	BN (UMNO)
N20	Lubok Merbau	Mohd Zainuddin Mohd Yusof	PR (PAS)
N21	Lintang	Ahamad Pakeh Adam	BN (UMNO)
N22	Jalong	Leong Mee Meng	PR (DAP)
N23	Manjoi	Nadzri Ismail	BN (UMNO)
N24	Hulu Kinta	Rusnah Kassim	BN (UMNO)
N25	Canning	Wong Kah Woh	PR (DAP)
N26	Tebing Tinggi	Ong Boon Piow	PR (DAP)
N27	Pasir Pinji	Thomas Su Keong Siong	PR (DAP)
N28	Bercham	Sum Cheok Leng	PR (DAP)
N29	Kepayang	Loke Chee Yan	PR (DAP)
N30	Buntong	Sivasubramaniam Athinarayanan	PR (DAP)
N31	Jelapang	Hee Yit Foong (Note: Hee Yit Foong was elected as a Pakatan Rakyat assemblyman in the general elections in 2008, resigned from DAP in February 2009 and became an independent.)	IND
N32	Menglembu	Lim Pek Har	PR (DAP)
N33	Tronoh	Sivakumar M. Varatharaju Naidu	PR (DAP)
N34	Bukit Chandan	Wan Mohammad Khair-il Anuar Wan Ahmad	BN (UMNO)
N35	Manong	Ramly Zahari	BN (UMNO)
N36	Pengkalan Baharu	Hamdi Abu Bakar	BN (UMNO)
N37	Pantai Remis	Nga Kor Ming	PR (DAP)
N38	Belanja	Mohd Zaim Abu Hassan	BN (UMNO)
N39	Bota	Nasarudin Hashim	BN (UMNO)
N40	Malim Nawar	Keshvinder Singh Kashmir Singh (Note: Keshvinder Singh was elected as a Pakatan Rakyat assemblyman in the general elections in 2008, resigned from DAP on 15 June 2010 and became an independent; then joined PPP few months later.)	BN (PPP)
N41	Keranji	Chen Fook Chye	PR (DAP)
N42	Tualang Sekah	Nolee Ashilin Mohamed Radzi	BN (UMNO)
N43	Sungai Rapat	Hamidah Osman	BN (UMNO)
N44	Simpang Pulai	Chan Ming Kai	PR (PKR)
N45	Teja	Chang Lih Kang	PR (PKR)
N46	Chenderiang	Mah Hang Soon	BN (MCA)
N47	Ayer Kuning	Samsudin Abu Hassan	BN (UMNO)
N48	Sungai Manik	Zainol Fadzi Paharudin	BN (UMNO)
N49	Kampong Gajah	Wan Norashikin Wan Noordin	BN (UMNO)
N50	Sitiawan	Ngeh Koo Ham	PR (DAP)
N51	Pasir Panjang	Mohammad Nizar Jamaluddin	PR (PAS)
N52	Pangkor	Zambry Abd Kadir	BN (UMNO)
N53	Rungkup	Sha'arani Mohamad	BN (UMNO)
N54	Hutan Melintang	Kesavan Subramaniam	PR (PKR)
N55	Pasir Bedamar	Seah Leong Peng	PR (DAP)
N56	Changkat Jong	Mohd Anuar Sudin	PR (PAS)
N57	Sungkai	Sivanesan Achalingam	PR (DAP)
N58	Slim	Mohd. Khusairi Abdul Talib	BN (UMNO)
N59	Behrang	Jamaluddin Mohd Radzi (Note: Jamaluddin Mohd Radzi was elected as a Pakatan Rakyat assemblyman in the general elections in 2008, resigned from PKR in February 2009 and became an independent.)	IND

== Pahang ==
No.	State Constituency	Member	Party
BN 37 | DAP 2 | PAS 2 | VAC 1
N01	Tanah Rata	Ho Yip Kap (Note: Ho Yip Kap originally won the Tanah Rata state seat as an independent candidate general elections in 2008. He joined Gerakan after the elections, thus effectively becoming a BN assemblyman.)	BN (Gerakan)
N02	Jelai	Wan Rosdy Wan Ismail	BN (UMNO)
N03	Padang Tengku	Abdul Rahman Mohamad	BN (UMNO)
N04	Cheka	Fong Koong Fuee	BN (MCA)
N05	Benta	Mohd. Soffi Abd. Razak	BN (UMNO)
N06	Batu Talam	Abd. Aziz Mat Kiram	BN (UMNO)
N07	Tras	Choong Siew Onn	PR (DAP)
N08	Dong	Shahiruddin Ab Moin	BN (UMNO)
N09	Tahan	Wan Amizan Wan Abdul Razak	BN (UMNO)
N10	Damak	Lau Lee	BN (MCA)
N11	Pulau Tawar	Ahmad Shukri Ismail	BN (UMNO)
N12	Beserah	Syed Mohammed Tuan Lonnik	PR (PAS)
N13	Semambu	Pang Tsu Ming	BN (MCA)
N14	Teruntum	Chang Hong Seong	BN (MCA)
N15	Tanjung Lumpur	Adnan Wan Mamat	BN (UMNO)
N16	Inderapura	Shafik Fauzan Sharif	BN (UMNO)
N17	Sungai Lembing	Md Sohaimi Mohamed Shah	BN (UMNO)
N18	Lepar	Mohd Shohaimi Jusoh	BN (UMNO)
N19	Panching	Mohd Zaili Besar	BN (UMNO)
N20	Pulau Manis	Khairuddin Mahmud	BN (UMNO)
N21	Peramu Jaya	Ibrahim Awang Ismail	BN (UMNO)
N22	Bebar	Ishak Muhamad	BN (UMNO)
N23	Chini	Abu Bakar Harun	BN (UMNO)
N24	Luit	Ahmad Munawar Abdul Jalil	BN (UMNO)
N25	Kuala Sentul	Shahaniza Shamsuddin	BN (UMNO)
N26	Chenor	Vacant since 18 June 2012 (Note: Barisan Nasional assemblyman who is also state government Executive Councilor (EXCO) for Pahang State Legislative Assembly; Tan Mohd Aminuddin Ishak from UMNO won the seat since 1990; however died on 18 June 2012 due to food poisoning after suffering from various health ailments, thus automatically leaving the seat vacant. No by-elections were held due to his death.)	VAC
N26	Chenor	Tan Mohd Aminuddin Ishak until 18 June 2012	BN (UMNO)
N27	Jenderak	Mohamed Jaafar	BN (UMNO)
N28	Kerdau	Syed Ibrahim Syed Ahmad from 6 March 2011 (Note: Syed Ibrahim Syed Ahmad was elected as a Barisan Nasional assemblyman in the by-election on 6 March 2011 following the death of assemblyman Zaharuddin Abu Kassim.)	BN (UMNO)
N28	Kerdau	Zaharuddin Abu Kassim until 12 February 2011	BN (UMNO)
N29	Jengka	Wan Salman Wan Ismail	BN (UMNO)
N30	Mentakab	Chuah Boon Seong	BN (MCA)
N31	Lanchang	Mohd Sharkar Shamsudin	BN (UMNO)
N32	Kuala Semantan	Syed Hamid Syed Mohd	PR (PAS)
N33	Bilut	Hoh Khai Mun	BN (MCA)
N34	Ketari	Ng Keong Chye	BN (Gerakan)
N35	Sabai	Davendran Murthy	BN (MIC)
N36	Pelangai	Adnan Yaakob	BN (UMNO)
N37	Guai	Norolazali Sulaiman	BN (UMNO)
N38	Triang	Leong Ngah Ngah	PR (DAP)
N39	Kemayan	Mohd Fadil Osman	BN (UMNO)
N40	Bukit Ibam	Mohamad Sahfri Ab Aziz	BN (UMNO)
N41	Muadzam Shah	Maznah Mazlan	BN (UMNO)
N42	Tioman	Mohd. Johari Hussain	BN (UMNO)

== Selangor ==
No.	State Constituency	Member	Party
BN 21 | PKR 13 | DAP 12 | PAS 7 | PSM 1 | IND 1 | VAC 1
N01	Sungai Air Tawar	Raja Ideris Raja Ahmad	BN (UMNO)
N02	Sabak	Warno Dogol	BN (UMNO)
N03	Sungai Panjang	Mohamed Khir Toyo	BN (UMNO)
N04	Sekinchan	Ng Suee Lim	PR (DAP)
N05	Hulu Bernam	Mohamed Idris Abu Bakar	BN (UMNO)
N06	Kuala Kubu Baharu	Wong Koon Mun	BN (MCA)
N07	Batang Kali	Mohd Isa Abu Kasim	BN (UMNO)
N08	Sungai Burong	Mohd Shamsudin Lias	BN (UMNO)
N09	Permatang	Sulaiman Abdul Razak	BN (UMNO)
N10	Bukit Melawati	Muthiah Maria Pillay	PR (PKR)
N11	Ijok	Abdul Khalid Ibrahim	PR (PKR)
N12	Jeram	Amiruddin Setro	BN (UMNO)
N13	Kuang	Abdul Shukur Idrus	BN (UMNO)
N14	Rawang	Gan Pei Nei	PR (PKR)
N15	Taman Templer	Subahan Kamal	BN (UMNO)
N16	Batu Caves	Amirudin Shari	PR (PKR)
N17	Gombak Setia	Hasan Mohamed Ali (Note: Hasan Mohamed Ali was elected as a Pakatan Rakyat assemblyman in the general elections in 2008, sacked from PAS on 8 January 2012 and became an independent.)	IND
N18	Hulu Kelang	Saari Sungib	PR (PAS)
N19	Bukit Antarabangsa	Mohamed Azmin Ali	PR (PKR)
N20	Lembah Jaya	Khasim Abdul Aziz	PR (PAS)
N21	Chempaka	Iskandar Abdul Samad	PR (PAS)
N22	Teratai	Jenice Lee Ying Ha	PR (DAP)
N23	Dusun Tua	Ismail Sani	BN (UMNO)
N24	Semenyih	Johan Abd Aziz	BN (UMNO)
N25	Kajang	Lee Kim Sin	PR (PKR)
N26	Bangi	Shafie Abu Bakar	PR (PAS)
N27	Balakong	Yap Lum Chin	PR (DAP)
N28	Seri Kembangan	Ean Yong Hian Wah	PR (DAP)
N29	Seri Serdang	Mohamad Satim Diman	BN (UMNO)
N30	Kinrara	Teresa Kok Suh Sim	PR (DAP)
N31	Subang Jaya	Hannah Yeoh Tseow Suan	PR (DAP)
N32	Seri Setia	Nik Nazmi Nik Ahmad	PR (PKR)
N33	Taman Medan	Haniza Mohamed Talha	PR (PKR)
N34	Bukit Gasing	Vacant since 20 December 2011 (Note: Pakatan Rakyat assemblyman Edward Lee Poh Lin from DAP won the seat in the general elections in 2008; however died on 20 December 2011, thus automatically leaving the seat vacant. No by-election were be held due to his death.)	VAC
N34	Bukit Gasing	Edward Lee Poh Lin until 20 December 2011	PR (DAP)
N35	Kampung Tunku	Lau Weng San	PR (DAP)
N36	Damansara Utama	Cheah Wing Yin	PR (DAP)
N37	Bukit Lanjan	Elizabeth Wong Keat Ping	PR (PKR)
N38	Paya Jaras	Muhammad Bushro Mat Johor	BN (UMNO)
N39	Kota Damansara	Mohd Nasir Hashim	PSM
N40	Kota Anggerik	Yaakob Sapari	PR (PKR)
N41	Batu Tiga	Rodziah Ismail	PR (PKR)
N42	Meru	Abd Rani Osman	PR (PAS)
N43	Sementa	Abd Rahman Palil	BN (UMNO)
N44	Sungai Pinang	Teng Chang Khim	PR (DAP)
N45	Selat Klang	Halimah Ali	PR (PAS)
N46	Pelabuhan Klang	Badrul Hisham Abdullah (Note: Badrul Hisham Abdullah was elected as a Pakatan Rakyat assemblyman in the general elections in 2008, resigned from PKR and later joined UMNO.)	BN (UMNO)
N47	Pandamaran	Ronnie Liu Tian Khiew	PR (DAP)
N48	Kota Alam Shah	Manoharan Malayalam	PR (DAP)
N49	Seri Andalas	Xavier Jayakumar Arulanandam	PR (PKR)
N50	Sri Muda	Mat Shuhaimi Shafiei	PR (PKR)
N51	Sijangkang	Ahmad Yunus Hairi	PR (PAS)
N52	Teluk Datuk	Philip Tan Choon Swee	PR (DAP)
N53	Morib	Hasiman Sidom	BN (UMNO)
N54	Tanjong Sepat	Karim Mansor	BN (UMNO)
N55	Dengkil	Marsum Paing	BN (UMNO)
N56	Sungai Pelek	Yap Ee Wah	BN (MCA)

== Negeri Sembilan ==
No.	State Constituency	Member	Party
BN 20 | DAP 10 | PKR 4 | PAS 1 | VAC 1
N01	Chennah	Siow Chen Pin	BN (MCA)
N02	Pertang	Razak Mansor	BN (UMNO)
N03	Sungai Lui	Zainal Abidin Ahmad	BN (UMNO)
N04	Klawang	Yunus Rahmat	BN (UMNO)
N05	Serting	Shamshulkahar Mohd. Deli	BN (UMNO)
N06	Palong	Aziz Shamsudin	BN (UMNO)
N07	Jeram Padang	Mogan Velayatham	BN (MIC)
N08	Bahau	Teo Kok Seong	PR (DAP)
N09	Lenggeng	Mustafa Salim	BN (UMNO)
N10	Nilai	Yap Yew Weng	PR (DAP)
N11	Lobak	Loke Siew Fook	PR (DAP)
N12	Temiang	Ng Chin Tsai	PR (DAP)
N13	Sikamat	Aminuddin Harun	PR (PKR)
N14	Ampangan	Rashid Latiff	PR (PKR)
N15	Juasseh	Mohammad Razi Kail	BN (UMNO)
N16	Seri Menanti	Abdul Samad Ibrahim	BN (UMNO)
N17	Senaling	Ismail Lasim	BN (UMNO)
N18	Pilah	Adnan Abu Hasan	BN (UMNO)
N19	Johol	Vacant since 4 October 2011 (Note: Barisan Nasional assemblyman Roslan Mohd Yusof from UMNO won the seat since 2004; however died on 4 October 2011 due to lung complications, thus automatically leaving the seat vacant. No by-election were be held due to his death.)	VAC
N19	Johol	Roslan Mohd Yusof until 4 October 2011	BN (UMNO)
N20	Labu	Hasim Rusdi	BN (UMNO)
N21	Bukit Kepayang	Cha Kee Chin	PR (DAP)
N22	Rahang	M.K. Arumugam	PR (DAP)
N23	Mambau	Wong May May	PR (DAP)
N24	Senawang	Gunasekaren Palasamy	PR (DAP)
N25	Paroi	Mohamad Taufek Abd Ghani	PR (PAS)
N26	Chembong	Zaifulbahri Idris	BN (UMNO)
N27	Rantau	Mohamad Hasan	BN (UMNO)
N28	Kota	Awaludin Said	BN (UMNO)
N29	Chuah	Chai Tong Chai	PR (PKR)
N30	Lukut	Ean Yong Tin Sin	PR (DAP)
N31	Bagan Pinang	Mohd Isa Abdul Samad from 11 October 2009 (Note: Mohd Isa Abdul Samad was elected as a Barisan Nasional assemblyman in the by-election on 11 October 2009 following the death of assemblyman Azman Mohammad Noor.)	BN (UMNO)
N31	Bagan Pinang	Azman Mohammad Noor until 4 September 2009	BN (UMNO)
N32	Linggi	Ismail Taib	BN (UMNO)
N33	Port Dickson	Ravi Munusamy	PR (PKR)
N34	Gemas	Zainab Nasir	BN (UMNO)
N35	Gemencheh	Mohd Kamil Abd Aziz	BN (UMNO)
N36	Repah	Veerapan Superamaniam	PR (DAP)

== Malacca ==
No.	State Constituency	Member	Party
BN 22 | DAP 5 | VAC 1
N01	Kuala Linggi	Ismail Othman	BN (UMNO)
N02	Tanjung Bidara	Ab Karim Sulaiman	BN (UMNO)
N03	Ayer Limau	Amiruddin Yusop	BN (UMNO)
N04	Lendu	Vacant since 10 March 2013 (Note: Barisan Nasional assemblyman who is also Deputy Speaker for Malacca State Legislative Assembly; Idderris Kassim from UMNO won the seat in the general elections in 2008; however died on 10 March 2013 due to colon cancer, thus automatically leaving the seat vacant. No by-election were be held due to his death.)	VAC
N04	Lendu	Idderris Kassim until 10 March 2013	BN (UMNO)
N05	Taboh Naning	Latipah Omar	BN (UMNO)
N06	Rembia	Norpipah Abdol	BN (UMNO)
N07	Gadek	Abdul Ghafar Atan	BN (UMNO)
N08	Machap	Lai Meng Chong	BN (MCA)
N09	Durian Tunggal	Ab Wahab Ab Latip	BN (UMNO)
N10	Asahan	R. Perumal	BN (MIC)
N11	Sungai Udang	Yaakub Md Amin	BN (UMNO)
N12	Pantai Kundor	Ab Rahman Ab Karim	BN (UMNO)
N13	Paya Rumput	Tahir Hassan	BN (UMNO)
N14	Kelebang	Seet Har Cheow	BN (MCA)
N15	Bachang	Lim Jak Wong	PR (DAP)
N16	Ayer Keroh	Khoo Poay Tiong	PR (DAP)
N17	Bukit Baru	Mohd Ali Rustam	BN (UMNO)
N18	Ayer Molek	Md Yunos Husin	BN (UMNO)
N19	Kesidang	Goh Leong San	PR (DAP)
N20	Kota Laksamana	Betty Chew Gek Cheng	PR (DAP)
N21	Duyong	Gan Tian Loo	BN (MCA)
N22	Bandar Hilir	Tey Kok Kiew	PR (DAP)
N23	Telok Mas	Latiff Tambi Chik	BN (UMNO)
N24	Bemban	Chua Kheng Hwa	BN (MCA)
N25	Rim	Yazed Khamis	BN (UMNO)
N26	Serkam	Ghazale Muhamad	BN (UMNO)
N27	Merlimau	Roslan Ahmad from 6 March 2011 (Note: Roslan Ahmad was elected as a Barisan Nasional assemblyman in the by-election on 6 March 2011 following the death of assemblyman Mohamad Hidhir Abu Hassan.)	BN (UMNO)
N27	Merlimau	Mohamad Hidhir Abu Hassan until 20 January 2011	BN (UMNO)
N28	Sungai Rambai	Hasan Abd Rahman	BN (UMNO)

== Johor ==
No.	State Constituency	Member	Party
BN 50 | DAP 4 | PAS 2
N01	Buloh Kasap	Othman Jais	BN (UMNO)
N02	Jementah	Lee Hong Tee	BN (MCA)
N03	Pemanis	Lau Chin Hoon	BN (Gerakan)
N04	Kemelah	Ayub Rahmat	BN (UMNO)
N05	Tenang	Mohd Azahar Ibrahim from 30 January 2011 (Note: Mohd Azahar Ibrahim was elected as a Barisan Nasional assemblyman in the by-election on 30 January 2011 following the death of assemblyman Sulaiman Taha.)	BN (UMNO)
N05	Tenang	Sulaiman Taha until 17 December 2010	BN (UMNO)
N06	Bekok	Tan Kok Hong	BN (MCA)
N07	Bukit Serampang	Tahir Mohd Taat	BN (UMNO)
N08	Jorak	Shahruddin Md Salleh	BN (UMNO)
N09	Gambir	Asojan Muniyandy	BN (MIC)
N10	Tangkak	Goh Tee Tee	BN (MCA)
N11	Serom	Abdul Ghani Othman	BN (UMNO)
N12	Bentayan	Gwee Tong Hiang	PR (DAP)
N13	Sungai Abong	Sheikh Ibrahim Salleh	PR (PAS)
N14	Bukit Naning	Abdullah Md Ali	BN (UMNO)
N15	Maharani	Mohammad Taslim	PR (PAS)
N16	Sungai Balang	Robia Kosai	BN (UMNO)
N17	Semerah	Ariss Samsudin	BN (UMNO)
N18	Sri Medan	Ahmad Zahri Jamil	BN (UMNO)
N19	Yong Peng	Lim Kee Moi	BN (MCA)
N20	Semarang	Samsolbari Jamali	BN (UMNO)
N21	Parit Yaani	Ng See Tiong	BN (MCA)
N22	Parit Raja	Ab Aziz Kaprawi	BN (UMNO)
N23	Penggaram	Koh Chee Chai	BN (MCA)
N24	Senggarang	Jaafar Hashim	BN (UMNO)
N25	Rengit	Ayub Jamil	BN (UMNO)
N26	Machap	Abd Hamid Abd Rahman	BN (UMNO)
N27	Layang-Layang	Onn Mohd Yassin	BN (UMNO)
N28	Mengkibol	Ng Lam Hua	PR (DAP)
N29	Mahkota	Md Jais Sarday	BN (UMNO)
N30	Paloh	Hoo Seong Chang	BN (MCA)
N31	Kahang	Vidyananthan Ramanadhan	BN (MIC)
N32	Endau	Zainal Abidin Osman	BN (UMNO)
N33	Tenggaroh	Murukasvary Thanarajan	BN (MIC)
N34	Panti	Baderi Dasuki	BN (UMNO)
N35	Pasir Raja	Adham Baba	BN (UMNO)
N36	Sedili	Rasman Ithnain	BN (UMNO)
N37	Johor Lama	Asiah Md Ariff	BN (UMNO)
N38	Penawar	Hamimah Mansor	BN (UMNO)
N39	Tanjong Surat	Harun Abdullah	BN (UMNO)
N40	Tiram	Maulizan Bujang	BN (UMNO)
N41	Puteri Wangsa	Abdul Halim Suleiman	BN (UMNO)
N42	Johor Jaya	Tan Cher Puk	BN (MCA)
N43	Permas	Munusamy M. Mareemuthu	BN (MIC)
N44	Tanjong Puteri	Adam Sumiru	BN (UMNO)
N45	Stulang	Mok Chek Hou	BN (MCA)
N46	Pengkalan Rinting	Chia Song Cheng	BN (MCA)
N47	Kempas	Osman Sapian	BN (UMNO)
N48	Skudai	Boo Cheng Hau	PR (DAP)
N49	Nusa Jaya	Abdul Aziz Sapian	BN (UMNO)
N50	Bukit Permai	Kamaruzaman Ali	BN (UMNO)
N51	Bukit Batu	Cheong Chin Liang	BN (Gerakan)
N52	Senai	Ong Kow Meng	PR (DAP)
N53	Benut	Hasni Mohammad	BN (UMNO)
N54	Pulai Sebatang	Tee Siew Kiong	BN (MCA)
N55	Pekan Nenas	Tang Nai Soon	BN (MCA)
N56	Kukup	Mohd. Othman Yusof	BN (UMNO)

== Sabah ==
No.	State Constituency	Member	Party
BN 57 | DAP 1 | SAPP 2
N01	Banggi	Abdul Mijul Unaini	BN (UMNO)
N02	Tanjong Kapor	Teo Chee Kang	BN (LDP)
N03	Pitas	Bolkiah Ismail	BN (UMNO)
N04	Matunggong	Sarapin Magana	BN (PBS)
N05	Tandek	Lasiah Baranting @ Anita	BN (PBS)
N06	Tempasuk	Musbah Jamli	BN (UMNO)
N07	Kadamaian	Timbon Lagadan	BN (PBS)
N08	Usukan	Japlin Akim @ Abd Hamid	BN (UMNO)
N09	Tamparuli	Jahid @ Nordin Jahim	BN (PBS)
N10	Sulaman	Hajiji Noor	BN (UMNO)
N11	Kiulu	Lovis Rampas	BN (PBS)
N12	Karambunai	Jainab Ahmad Ayid	BN (UMNO)
N13	Inanam	Goh Chin Lok @ Johnny Goh	BN (PBS)
N14	Likas	Liew Teck Chan (Note: Liew Teck Chan was elected as a Barisan Nasional assemblyman in the general elections in 2008, became independent following SAPP's withdrawal from Barisan.)	SAPP
N15	Api-Api	Yee Moh Chai	BN (PBS)
N16	Luyang	Melanie Chia Chui Ket (Note: Melanie Chia Chui Ket was elected as a Barisan Nasional assemblyman in the general elections in 2008, became independent following SAPP's withdrawal from Barisan.)	SAPP
N17	Tanjong Aru	Yong Oui Fah	BN (PBS)
N18	Petagas	Yahyah @ Yahya Hussin Ag Husin	BN (UMNO)
N19	Kapayan	Khoo Keok Hai	BN (MCA)
N20	Moyog	Donald Peter Mojuntin	BN (UPKO)
N21	Kawang	Ghulam Haidar Khan Bahadar	BN (UMNO)
N22	Pantai Manis	Abdul Rahim Ismail	BN (UMNO)
N23	Bongawan	Karim Bujang	BN (UMNO)
N24	Membakut	Mohd. Arifin Mohd. Arif	BN (UMNO)
N25	Klias	Azizah Mohd Dun	BN (UMNO)
N26	Kuala Penyu	Teo Kwan Chin @ Teo Mau Sing	BN (UPKO)
N27	Lumadan	Kamarlin Ombi	BN (UMNO)
N28	Sindumin	Ahmad Bujang	BN (UMNO)
N29	Kundasang	Joachim Gunsalam	BN (PBS)
N30	Karanaan	Masidi Manjung @ Masdi	BN (UMNO)
N31	Paginatan	Ewon Ebin	BN (UPKO)
N32	Tambunan	Joseph Pairin Kitingan	BN (PBS)
N33	Bingkor	Justin Guka	BN (UPKO)
N34	Liawan	Sairin Karno	BN (UMNO)
N35	Melalap	Radin Malleh	BN (PBS)
N36	Kemabong	Rubin Balang	BN (UMNO)
N37	Sook	Ellron Alfred Angin	BN (PBRS)
N38	Nabawan	Bobbey Ah Fang Suan	BN (UPKO)
N39	Sugut	Surady Kayong	BN (UMNO)
N40	Labuk	Metah @ Micheal Asang	BN (PBS)
N41	Gum-Gum	Zakaria Mohd Edris @ Tubau	BN (UMNO)
N42	Sungai Sibuga	Musa Aman	BN (UMNO)
N43	Sekong	Samsudin Yahya	BN (UMNO)
N44	Karamunting	Peter Pang En Yin	BN (Gerakan)
N45	Elopura	Au Kam Wah	BN (Gerakan)
N46	Tanjong Papat	Raymond Tan Shu Kiah	BN (Gerakan)
N47	Kuamut	Masiung Banah	BN (UPKO)
N48	Sukau	Saddi Abdu Rahman	BN (UMNO)
N49	Tungku	Mohd Suhaili Said	BN (UMNO)
N50	Lahad Datu	Nasrun Mansur	BN (UMNO)
N51	Kunak	Nilwan Kabang	BN (UMNO)
N52	Sulabayan	Harman Mohamad	BN (UMNO)
N53	Senallang	Nasir Sakaran	BN (UMNO)
N54	Bugaya	Ramlee Marhaban	BN (UMNO)
N55	Balung	Syed Abas Syed Ali	BN (UMNO)
N56	Apas	Tawfiq Abu Bakar Titingan	BN (UMNO)
N57	Sri Tanjong	Jimmy Wong Sze Phin	PR (DAP)
N58	Merotai	Pang Yuk Ming	BN (LDP)
N59	Tanjong Batu	Hamisa Samat	BN (UMNO)
N60	Sebatik	Abdul Muis Picho	BN (UMNO)

== Sarawak ==
=== 2011–2016 ===
There were several desertions from Sarawak United Peoples' Party (SUPP) and Sarawak Progressive Democratic Party (SPDP) in the state governing coalition Barisan Nasional, in which these members joined independent parties such as Sarawak People's Energy Party (TERAS) and United People's Party (UPP) which were otherwise friendly to Barisan Nasional. The opposition coalition Pakatan Rakyat that contested the Sarawak state elections in 2011 was dissolved after series of disagreements between two main parties, Democratic Action Party(DAP) and Pan-Malaysian Islamic Party (PAS). A new opposition coalition Pakatan Harapan was formed by the Democratic Action Party, People's Justice Party (PKR) and newly formed party National Trust Party (PAN), consisting of ex-PAS members.

No.	State constituency	Member	Party
BN 45 | DAP 11 | PKR 3 | SWP 1 | TERAS 5 | UPP 4 | IND 1 | VAC 1
N01	Opar	Ranum Mina (Note: Ranum Mina was elected as a Barisan Nasional assemblyman in the state elections in 2011, quit his SUPP membership, joining firstly joined Teras, and then United People's Party, an independent party friendly to Barisan.)	UPP
N02	Tasik Biru	Peter Nansian Ngusie (Note: Peter Nansian Ngusie was elected as a Barisan Nasional assemblyman in the state elections in 2011, was stripped of his SPDP membership and joined Teras, an independent party friendly to Barisan.)	TERAS
N03	Tanjong Datu	Adenan Satem	BN (PBB)
N04	Pantai Damai	Abdul Rahman Junaidi	BN (PBB)
N05	Demak Laut	Hazland Abang Hipni	BN (PBB)
N06	Tupong	Daud Abdul Rahman	BN (PBB)
N07	Samariang	Sharifah Hasidah Sayeed Aman Ghazali	BN (PBB)
N08	Satok	Abang Abdul Rahman Zohari Abang Openg	BN (PBB)
N09	Padungan	Wong King Wei	PH (DAP)
N10	Pending	Violet Yong Wui Wui	PH (DAP)
N11	Batu Lintang	See Chee How	PH (PKR)
N12	Kota Sentosa	Chong Chieng Jen	PH (DAP)
N13	Batu Kawah	Christina Chiew Wang See	PH (DAP)
N14	Asajaya	Abdul Karim Rahman Hamzah	BN (PBB)
N15	Muara Tuang	Mohamad Ali Mahmud	BN (PBB)
N16	Bengoh	Jerip Susil (Note: Jerip Susil was elected as a Barisan Nasional assemblyman in the state elections in 2011, quit his SUPP membership, joining Teras and then United People's Party, an independent party friendly to Barisan.)	UPP
N17	Tarat	Roland Sagah Wee Inn	BN (PBB)
N18	Tebedu	Michael Manyin Jawong	BN (PBB)
N19	Kedup	Maclaine Ben @ Martin Ben	BN (PBB)
N20	Sadong Jaya	Aidel Lariwoo	BN (PBB)
N21	Simunjan	Mohd. Naroden Majais	BN (PBB)
N22	Sebuyau	Julaihi Narawi	BN (PBB)
N23	Lingga	Simoi Peri	BN (PBB)
N24	Beting Maro	Razaili Gapor	BN (PBB)
N25	Balai Ringin	Snowdan Lawan	BN (PRS)
N26	Bukit Begunan	Mong Dagang	BN (PRS)
N27	Simanggang	Francis Harden Hollis	BN (SUPP)
N28	Engkilili	Johnical Rayong Ngipa (Note: Johnical Rayong Ngipa was elected as a Barisan Nasional assemblyman in the state elections in 2011, quit his SUPP membership, joining Teras and then United People's Party, an independent party friendly to Barisan.)	UPP
N29	Batang Air	Malcom Mussen Lamoh	BN (PRS)
N30	Saribas	Ricky @ Mohammad Razi Sitam	BN (PBB)
N31	Layar	Alfred Jabu Numpang	BN (PBB)
N32	Bukit Saban	Robert Lawson Chuat Vincent Entering	BN (PBB)
N33	Kalaka	Abdul Wahab Aziz	BN (PBB)
N34	Krian	Ali Biju	PH (PKR)
N35	Belawai	Len Talif Salleh	BN (PBB)
N36	Semop	Abdullah Saidol	BN (PBB)
N37	Daro	Murni Suhaili	BN (PBB)
N38	Jemoreng	Abu Seman Jahwie	BN (PBB)
N39	Repok	Wong Hua Seh	PH (DAP)
N40	Meradong	Ting Tze Fui	PH (DAP)
N41	Pakan	William Mawan Ikom (Note: William Mawan was elected as a Barisan Nasional assemblyman in the state elections in 2011, quit his SPDP membership and joined Teras, ann independent party friendly to Barisan.)	TERAS
N42	Meluan	Wong Judat (Note: Wong Judat who was elected as a Barisan Nasional assemblyman in the state elections in 2011, quit SPDP and joined Sarawak Workers Party.)	SWP
N43	Ngemah	Alexander Vincent	BN (PRS)
N44	Machan	Gramong Juna	BN (PBB)
N45	Bukit Assek	Vacant since 21 June 2014 (Note: Pakatan Rakyat assemblyman Wong Ho Leng from DAP won the seat in the state elections in 2011; however died of brain cancer on 21 June 2014, thus automatically leaving the seat vacant. No by-election were be held due to his death.)	VAC
N45	Bukit Assek	Wong Ho Leng until 21 June 2014	PR (DAP)
N46	Dudong	Yap Hoi Liong	PH (DAP)
N47	Bawang Assan	Wong Soon Koh (Note: Wong Soon Koh was elected as a Barisan Nasional assemblyman in the state elections in 2011, quit his SUPP membership, joining Teras and then United People's Party, an independent party friendly to Barisan.)	UPP
N48	Pelawan	David Wong Kee Woan	PH (DAP)
N49	Nangka	Annuar Rapaee	BN (PBB)
N50	Dalat	Fatimah Abdullah	BN (PBB)
N51	Balingian	Yussibnosh Balo from 29 March 2014 (Note: Yussibnosh Balo was elected as a Barisan Nasional assemblyman on 29 March 2014 in a by-election following the resignation of assemblyman Abdul Taib Mahmud, former Sarawak Chief Minister)	BN (PBB)
N51	Balingian	Abdul Taib Mahmud until 28 February 2014	BN (PBB)
N52	Tamin	Joseph Mauh Ikeh	BN (PRS)
N53	Kakus	John Sikie Tayai	BN (PRS)
N54	Pelagus	George Lagong (Note: George Lagong who was elected as an independent assemblyman in the state elections in 2011, joined the Sarawak Workers Party and finally Teras, a party friendly to Barisan.)	IND
N55	Katibas	Ambrose Blikau Enturan	BN (PBB)
N56	Baleh	James Jemut Masing	BN (PRS)
N57	Belaga	Liwan Lagang	BN (PRS)
N58	Jepak	Talib Zulpilip	BN (PBB)
N59	Kidurong	Chiew Chiu Sing	PH (DAP)
N60	Kemena	Stephen Rundi Utom	BN (PBB)
N61	Bekenu	Rosey Yunus (Note: Rosey Yunus was elected as a Barisan Nasional assemblyman in the state elections in 2011, was stripped of his SPDP membership and joined Teras, an independent party friendly to Barisan.)	TERAS
N62	Lambir	Ripin Lamat	BN (PBB)
N63	Piasau	Alan Ling Sie Kiong	PH (DAP)
N64	Pujut	Fong Pau Teck	PH (DAP)
N65	Senadin	Lee Kim Shin	BN (SUPP)
N66	Marudi	Sylvester Entire Muran (Note: Sylvester Entrie was elected as a Barisan Nasional assemblymen in the state elections in 2011, was stripped of his SPDP membership and joined Teras, an independent party friendly to Barisan.)	TERAS
N67	Telang Usan	Dennis Ngau	BN (PBB)
N68	Bukit Kota	Abdul Rahman Ismail	BN (PBB)
N69	Batu Danau	Paulus Gumbang (Note: Paulus Palu Gumbang was elected as a Barisan Nasional assemblyman in the state elections in 2011, was stripped of his SPDP membership and joined Teras, an independent party friendly to Barisan.)	TERAS
N70	Ba'kelalan	Baru Bian	PH (PKR)
N71	Bukit Sari	Awang Tengah Ali Hasan	BN (PBB)
