= Penang State Executive Council =

Executive branch of the Penang state government

- 2023–present
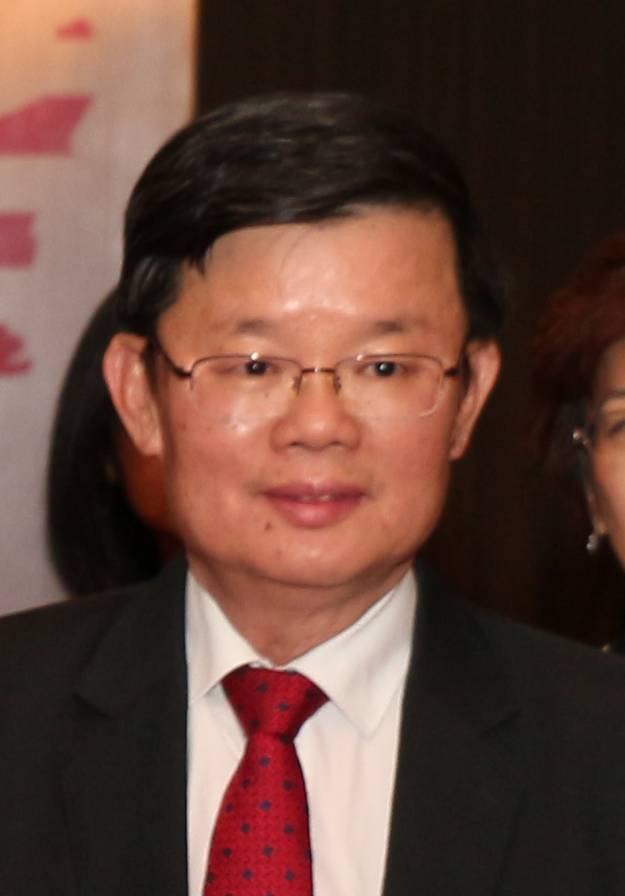
- Date formed: 13 August 2023

People and organisations
- Head of state: Ramli Ngah Talib
- Head of government: Chow Kon Yeow (PH–DAP)
- Total no. of members: 11
- Member parties: Pakatan Harapan (PH) and Barisan Nasional (BN) coalition government: Pakatan Harapan (PH); Democratic Action Party (DAP); People's Justice Party (PKR); Barisan Nasional (BN); United Malays National Organisation (UMNO)
- Status in legislature: Coalition government 29 / 40
- Opposition parties: Perikatan Nasional (PN); Malaysian Islamic Party (PAS); Malaysian United Indigenous Party (BERSATU)
- Opposition leader: Muhammad Fauzi Yusoff (PN–PAS)

History
- Legislature term: 15th Penang State Legislative Assembly

The Penang State Executive Council is the executive branch of the Penang state government. It is headed by the chief minister, who is appointed by the governor, Penang's head of state. The council also comprises between four and ten other members of the Penang State Legislative Assembly, along with ex officio civil servants – namely the state secretary, the state legal adviser and the state financial officer.

While smaller in size, the Penang State Executive Council is similar in structure and function to the Malaysian federal cabinet. Federal and state responsibilities vary, resulting in portfolios that vary between the two levels of government. The Executive Council is collectively accountable to the Penang State Legislative Assembly.

== Structure of government ==
=== Appointment of the executive ===
The chief minister, as Penang's head of government, must be appointed by the governor of Penang (Malay: Yang di-Pertua Negeri Pulau Pinang) on the basis that the former commands the confidence of a majority of the state assemblymen in the Penang State Legislative Assembly. On the advice of the chief minister, the governor shall form the Penang State Executive Council by appointing "not more than ten nor less than four other members" from among the state assemblymen.

Aside from the Executive Council, the governor shall also appoint another three executive officers, namely the state secretary, the state legal adviser and the state financial officer.

- The state secretary serves as the principal officer who handles the administrative affairs of the state.
- The state legal adviser shall provide advice on legal matters upon request from either the governor or the state government.
- The state financial officer is in charge of the financial affairs of the state.

These officers retain the right to participate in the proceedings of the Executive Council and may be appointed to any of the committees in the council. However, they are not permitted to vote in the Executive Council or within any of the committees.

Before exercising the duties of the executive office, an incoming member of the Executive Council must take and subscribe the Oath of Office and Allegiance in the presence of the governor. The Oath of Office and Allegiance reads as follows.

I, [name], having been appointed to the office of [name of office], do solemnly swear [or affirm] that I will faithfully discharge the duties of that office to the best of my ability, that I will bear true faith and allegiance to the State of Penang, and that I will preserve, protect and defend the Constitution of the State of Penang.

In addition, every incoming member of the Executive Council, plus the state secretary, the state legal adviser and the state financial officer, must also take and subscribe the Oath of Secrecy before the governor. The Oath of Secrecy is as follows.

I, [name], do solemnly swear [or affirm] that I will not directly or indirectly communicate or reveal to any person any matter which shall be brought under my consideration or shall become known to me as a member of the Executive Council of the State of Penang except as may be required for the due discharge of my duties as such or may be specially permitted by the Yang di-Pertua Negeri.

=== Vacation of office ===
Any member of the Penang State Executive Council, apart from the chief minister, shall hold office at the governor's pleasure, but may at any time resign from his or her position. If the chief minister ceases to command the confidence of the majority of the state assemblymen in the Penang State Legislative Assembly, the chief minister shall tender the resignation of the entire Executive Council. However, in this particular circumstance, the chief minister also reserves the option to advise the governor to dissolve the Legislative Assembly, thus paving the way for fresh state-level election. Aside from that, the Executive Council ceases to exist upon the vacancy of the Office of the chief minister, unless the vacancy arises while the Legislative Assembly is dissolved.

== Lists of full members ==
=== Chow Kon Yeow II EXCO (2023–present) ===
PH (10)	BN (1)
DAP (8); PKR (2)	UMNO (1)

Members since 13 August 2023 have been :

Name	Portfolio	Party	Constituency	Term start	Term end
Chow Kon Yeow MP (Chief Minister)	Finance; Economic Development; Land; Communications	PH (DAP)	Padang Kota	13 August 2023	Incumbent
Dr. Mohamad Abdul Hamid (Deputy Chief Minister I)	Islamic Development; Education; Higher Education; Cooperative Development (2026–present); Community Unity (2023–2026)	PH (PKR)	Batu Maung	16 August 2023	Incumbent
Jagdeep Singh Deo (Deputy Chief Minister II)	Human Capital Development; Science and Technology	PH (DAP)	Datok Keramat	16 August 2023	Incumbent
Wong Hon Wai	Tourism; Creative Economy	PH (DAP)	Paya Terubong	16 August 2023	Incumbent
Zairil Khir Johari	Infrastructure; Transport; Digital Development	PH (DAP)	Tanjong Bunga	16 August 2023	Incumbent
Lim Siew Khim	Social Development; Welfare; Non-Islamic Religious Affairs	PH (DAP)	Sungai Pinang	16 August 2023	Incumbent
Daniel Gooi Zi Sen	Youth; Sports; Health	PH (DAP)	Padang Lalang	16 August 2023	Incumbent
Jason H'ng Mooi Lye	Local Government; Town & Country Planning	PH (DAP)	Jawi	16 August 2023	Incumbent
Sundarajoo Somu	Housing; Environment	PH (DAP)	Perai	16 August 2023	Incumbent
Fahmi Zainol	Agrotechnology & Food Security; Cooperative Development	PH (PKR)	Pantai Jerejak	16 August 2023	4 March 2026
Goh Choon Aik	Trade; Community Unity	PH (PKR)	Bukit Tambun	6 March 2026	Incumbent
Rashidi Zinol	Entrepreneurial Development; Rural Development; Agrotechnology & Food Security (2026–present); Trade and Entrepreneurial Development (2023–2026)	BN (UMNO)	Sungai Acheh	16 August 2023	Incumbent

=== Ex officio members ===
The state secretary, the state legal adviser and the state financial officer are the ex officio members of the Executive Council.

Name	Position	Note
Jafri Abd Jalil	State Secretary	
Wan Nor Sakina	State Legal Adviser	
Zabidah Safar	State Financial Officer	

== Former membership ==
=== Chow Kon Yeow I EXCO (2018–2023) ===
PH (11)
- DAP (8)
- PKR (3)

Members from 14 May 2018 to 13 August 2023 were :

Name	Portfolio	Party	Constituency	Term start	Term end
Chow Kon Yeow MP (Chief Minister)	Land Affairs; Land Development; Transport (2018–2020); Information (2018–2020); Communications (2020–2023)	DAP	Padang Kota	14 May 2018	13 August 2023
Ahmad Zakiyuddin Abdul Rahman (Deputy Chief Minister I)	Islamic Affairs; Industry Development; Cooperatives (2020–2023); Community Relations (2018–2020); Community Empowerment (2020–2023)	PKR	Pinang Tunggal	16 May 2018	13 August 2023
Ramasamy Palanisamy (Deputy Chief Minister II)	State Economic Planning; Education; Human Capital Development (2018–2020); Human Resources (2020–2023); Science, Technology and Innovation	DAP	Perai	16 May 2018	13 August 2023
Jagdeep Singh Deo	Local Government; Housing; Urban and Rural Planning	DAP	Datok Keramat	16 May 2018	13 August 2023
Zairil Khir Johari	Public Works (2018–2020); Utilities (2018–2020); Flood Mitigation (2018–2020); Infrastructure (2020–2023); Transport (2020–2023)	DAP	Tanjong Bunga	16 May 2018	13 August 2023
Abdul Halim Hussain	Domestic and International Trade; Consumer Affairs; Entrepreneurship Development	PKR	Batu Maung	16 May 2018	13 August 2023
Dr. Afif Bahardin	Health; Agriculture & Agro-based Industries (2018–2020); Agrotech and Food Security (2020–2023); Rural Development	PKR	Seberang Jaya	16 May 2018	4 March 2020
Norlela Ariffin	Health; Agriculture & Agro-based Industries (2018–2020); Agrotech and Food Security (2020–2023); Rural Development	PKR	Penanti	12 March 2020	13 August 2023
Phee Boon Poh	Welfare; Environment	DAP	Sungai Puyu	16 May 2018	13 August 2023
Chong Eng	Women, Family, Gender Inclusiveness (2018–2020); Community development (2018–2020); Social Development (2020–2023); Non-Islamic Religious Affairs (2020–2023)	DAP	Padang Lalang	16 May 2018	13 August 2023
Yeoh Soon Hin	Tourism Development; Heritage (2018–2020); Culture & Arts (2018–2020); Creative Economy (2020–2023)	DAP	Paya Terubong	16 May 2018	13 August 2023
Soon Lip Chee	Youth; Sports	DAP	Bagan Jermal	16 May 2018	13 August 2023

=== Lim Guan Eng II EXCO (2013–2018) ===
DAP (8) PKR (3)

Members from 2013 to 2018 were :

Name	Portfolio	Party	Constituency	Term start	Term end
Lim Guan Eng (Chief Minister)	Land Affairs and Land Development; Information; Heritage & Non-Islamic Religious Affairs	DAP	Air Putih	9 May 2013	2018
Mohd Rashid Hasnon (Deputy Chief Minister I)	Industrial Development; International Trade; Cooperatives and Community Relations; Entrepreneur Development	PKR	Pantai Jerejak	9 May 2013	2018
Ramasamy Palanisamy (Deputy Chief Minister II)	State Economic Planning; Education; Human Resources; Science, Technology and Innovation	DAP	Perai	9 May 2013	2018
Chow Kon Yeow	Local Government; Traffic Management; Flood Mitigation	DAP	Padang Kota	9 May 2013	2018
Lim Hock Seng	Public Works; Utilities (Energy, Water and Telecom); Transport (Air, Sea and Train)	DAP	Bagan Jermal	9 May 2013	2018
Law Heng Kiang	Tourism Development; Culture	DAP	Batu Lancang	9 May 2013	2018
Phee Boon Poh	Welfare; Caring Society; Environment	DAP	Sungai Puyu	9 May 2013	2018
Jagdeep Singh Deo	Town; Rural Planning; Housing	DAP	Datok Keramat	9 May 2013	2018
Chong Eng	Youth and Sports; Women, Family; Community Development; Arts	DAP	Padang Lalang	9 May 2013	2018
Abdul Malik Abul Kassim	Religious Affairs; Domestic Trade; Consumer Affairs	PKR	Batu Maung	9 May 2013	2018
Dr. Afif Bahardin	Agriculture & Agro-Based Industry; Rural Development; Health	PKR	Seberang Jaya	9 May 2013	2018

=== Lim Guan Eng I EXCO (2008–2013) ===
DAP (8) PKR (3)

Members from 2008 to 2013 were :

Name	Portfolio	Party	Constituency	Term start	Term end
Lim Guan Eng (Chief Minister)	Industrial Development; International Trade; Land Affairs; Land Development	DAP	Air Putih	13 March 2008	8 May 2013
Mohammad Fairus Khairuddin (Deputy Chief Minister I)	Religious Affairs; Entrepreneur and Cooperative Development; Information; Community Relations	PKR	Penanti	13 March 2008	2009
Mansor Othman (Deputy Chief Minister I)	Religious Affairs; Entrepreneur and Cooperative Development; Information; Community Relations	PKR	Penanti	2009	8 May 2013
Ramasamy Palanisamy (Deputy Chief Minister II)	State Economic Planning; Education; Human Resources; Science, Technology and Innovation.	DAP	Perai	13 March 2008	8 May 2013
Chow Kon Yeow	Local Government; Traffic Management; Environment	DAP	Padang Kota	13 March 2008	8 May 2013
Lim Hock Seng	Public Works; Utilities (Energy, Water and Telecom); Transport (Air, Sea and Train)	DAP	Bagan Jermal	13 March 2008	8 May 2013
Law Heng Kiang	Tourism Development; Culture; Arts; Heritage	DAP	Batu Lancang	13 March 2008	8 May 2013
Phee Boon Poh	Health; Welfare; Caring Society	DAP	Sungai Puyu	13 March 2008	8 May 2013
Wong Hon Wai	Housing; Urban; Rural Planning	DAP	Air Itam	13 March 2008	8 May 2013
Ong Kok Fooi	Youth and Sports; Women, Family and Community Development	DAP	Berapit	13 March 2008	8 May 2013
Abdul Malik Abul Kassim	Domestic Trade; Consumer Affairs	PKR	Batu Maung	13 March 2008	8 May 2013
Law Choo Kiang	Agriculture; Agro-based Industries; Rural Development; Flood Mitigation	PKR	Bukit Tambun	13 March 2008	8 May 2013

=== Koh Tsu Koon IV EXCO (2004–2008) ===
BN (11)
- Gerakan (4)
- UMNO (4)
- MCA (2)
- MIC (1)

Members from 2004 to 2008 were :

Name	Portfolio	Party	Constituency	Term start	Term end
Koh Tsu Koon (Chief Minister)	Industrial Development; International Trade; Town and Country Planning	Gerakan	Tanjong Bunga	2004	2008
Abdul Rashid Abdullah (Deputy Chief Minister)	Religious Affairs; Land Affairs and Land Development; Entrepreneurial Development and Cooperatives	UMNO	Sungai Bakap	2004	2008
Teng Hock Nan	Local Government; Traffic Management; Information; Community Relations	Gerakan	Pulau Tikus	2004	2008
Toh Kin Woon	State Economic Planning; Education; Human Resources; Science, Technology and Innovation	Gerakan	Machang Bubok	2004	2008
Teng Chang Yeow	Tourism Development; Environment	Gerakan	Padang Kota	2004	2008
Azhar Ibrahim	Agriculture and Agro-based Industry; Rural Development; Flood Mitigation	UMNO	Penaga	2004	2008
Jahara Hamid	Youth and Sports; Women, Family and Community Development	UMNO	Telok Ayer Tawar	2004	2008
Syed Amerruddin Syed Ahmad	Housing; Culture, Arts and Heritage	UMNO	Bayan Lepas	2004	2008
Koay Kar Huah	Public Works; Utilities (Energy, Water, Telecom); Transportation (Air, Sea and Rail)	MCA	Seri Delima	2004	2008
Lau Chiek Tuan	Domestic Trade; Consumer Affairs	MCA	Berapit	2004	2008
Subbaiyah Palaniappan	Health; Welfare; Caring Society	MIC	Bagan Dalam	2004	2008

=== Koh Tsu Koon III EXCO (1999–2004) ===
BN (11)
- Gerakan (4)
- UMNO (4)
- MCA (2)
- MIC (1)

Members from 1999 to 2004 were :

Name	Portfolio	Party	Constituency	Term start	Term end
Koh Tsu Koon (Chief Minister)		Gerakan	Tanjong Bunga	1999	2004
Hilmi Yahaya (Deputy Chief Minister)	Religion; Land Affairs; Planning and Coordination of Development Programmes	UMNO	Telok Bahang	1999	2004
Kee Phaik Cheen	Tourism, Culture, Arts; Women Development	Gerakan	Batu Uban	1999	2004
Toh Kin Woon	Economic Planning; Education; Human Development	Gerakan	Machang Bubok	1999	2004
Teng Hock Nan	Local Government; Environment; Traffic Management	Gerakan	Kebun Bunga	1999	2004
Abdul Rashid Abdullah	Housing; Entrepreneur; Cooperative Development	UMNO	Sungai Acheh	1999	2004
Azhar Ibrahim	Agriculture; Fisheries; Rural Development	UMNO	Penaga	1999	2004
Jahara Hamid	Youth and Sports; Information; National Unity	UMNO	Telok Ayer Tawar	1999	2004
Koay Kar Huah	Works; Public Amenities; Transport	MCA	Bukit Gelugor	1999	2004
Loh Hock Hun	Trade; Commerce; Consumer Affairs	MCA	Paya Terubong	1999	2004
Rajapathy Kuppusamy	Health; Welfare; Caring Society	MIC	Perai	1999	2004

=== Koh Tsu Koon II EXCO (1995–1999) ===
BN (11)
- Gerakan (4)
- UMNO (4)
- MCA (2)
- MIC (1)

Members from 1995 to 1999 were :

Name	Portfolio	Party	Constituency	Term start	Term end
Koh Tsu Koon (Chief Minister)	Local Government	Gerakan	Tanjong Bunga	3 May 1995	1999
Mohd Shariff Omar (Deputy Chief Minister)	Housing; Agriculture (May–October 1995); Rural Development; Religion (October 1995–1999); Environmental Development (October 1995–1999)	UMNO	Permatang Berangan	1 May 1995	1999
Kang Chin Seng	Science, Technology; Human Resources; Industrial Innovation (October 1995–1999)	Gerakan	Sungai Pinang	1 May 1995	1999
Kee Phaik Cheen	Tourism; Arts; Women's Development	Gerakan	Batu Uban	1 May 1995	1999
Toh Kin Woon	Education; Economic Planning; Publicity	Gerakan	Machang Bubok	6 October 1995	1999
Hilmi Yahaya	Infrastructure; Public Utilities (May–October 1995); Transport (October 1995–1999); Information (October 1995–1999)	UMNO	Telok Bahang	1 May 1995	1999
Abdul Latiff Mirasa	Land; Environmental Development (May–October 1995); Entrepreneur Development (October 1995–1999); Cooperatives Development (October 1995–1999)	UMNO	Seberang Jaya	1 May 1995	1999
Abdul Rashid Abdullah	Agriculture; Fisheries	UMNO	Sungai Acheh	6 October 1995	1999
Sak Cheng Lum	Trade, Commerce; Consumer Affairs	MCA	Bagan Jermal	1 May 1995	1999
Koay Kar Huah	Youth and Sports	MCA	Bukit Gelugor	6 October 1995	1999
Rajapathy Kuppusamy	Health; Welfare; Caring Society (October 1995–1999)	MIC	Perai	1 May 1995	1999

=== Koh Tsu Koon I EXCO (1990–1995) ===
BN (9)
- Gerakan (4)
- UMNO (5)

Members from 1990 to 1995 were :

Name	Portfolio	Party	Constituency	Term start	Term end
Koh Tsu Koon (Chief Minister)		Gerakan	Tanjong Bunga	1990	1995
Ibrahim Saad (Deputy Chief Minister)	Land Development; Industrial Planning	UMNO	Seberang Jaya	1990	1995
Goh Cheng Teik	Local Government; New Villages Development	Gerakan	Sungai Bakap	1990	1995
Zakaria Bakar	Housing; Environment	UMNO	Ara Rendang	1990	1995
Kee Phaik Cheen	Tourism; Youth; Sports; Welfare	Gerakan	Batu Uban	1990	1995
Yahaya Abdul Hamid	Agriculture; Rural Development	UMNO	Pinang Tunggal	1990	1995
Kang Chin Seng	Science; Technology; Human Resources Development	Gerakan	Sungai Pinang	1990	1995
Ibrahim Yaakob	Religious Affairs; Education; Culture; Health	UMNO	Sungai Acheh	1990	1995
Hilmi Yahaya	Infrastructure; Public Utilities	UMNO	Telok Bahang	1990	1995

== See also ==
- Penang state government
- Governor of Penang
- Chief Minister of Penang
- Penang State Legislative Assembly
