= Deputy Chief Minister of Penang =

- Incumbent; Mohamad Abdul Hamid (Deputy Chief Minister I); Jagdeep Singh Deo (Deputy Chief Minister II)
- Nominator: Chief Minister
- Appointer: Governor of Penang
- Inaugural holder: Ramasamy Palanisamy
- Formation: 2008; 18 years ago (as Deputy Chief Minister of Penang II)

The Deputy Chief Minister of Penang are the second-highest executive officials of Penang, just next to the chief minister. Penang is also the only Malaysian state which appoints two Deputy Chief Ministers - one representing the Malay community and the other an ethnic Indian. This serves to shape a top leadership consisting of various backgrounds, representing the diverse ethnicities of the state.

== History ==
After the Independence of Malaysia in 1957, the deputy chief minister never created until Parti Gerakan Rakyat Malaysia (Gerakan) take over Penang in 1969, it was held by Parti Gerakan Rakyat Malaysia (Gerakan). After Gerakan joined Barisan Nasional, it was held by its component party United Malays National Organisation (UMNO) to represent of Malay Community, the post of chief minister was held by Parti Gerakan Rakyat Malaysia (GERAKAN) due to Penang population were majority Chinese. The 2008 general election which saw BN in Penang collapse. The new Pakatan Rakyat chief minister Lim Guan Eng appointed two deputy chief minister, one is represent of Malay Community and one is represent of ethnic Indian. Ramasamy was elected to the Malaysian Parliament and Penang State Legislative Assembly in the 2008 election, defeating former Chief Minister of Penang Koh Tsu Koon. He became Deputy Chief Minister of Penang II after the election, serving under the new Chief Minister Lim Guan Eng, making him the first person of Indian origin to hold the post of deputy chief minister in any Malaysian state. In August 2023, Jagdeep Singh Deo succeeded to the post.

== List of Deputy Chief Ministers ==
=== Deputy Chief Minister I ===
Colour key (for political coalition/parties):

Coalition	Component party	Timeline
–	Parti Gerakan Rakyat Malaysia (Gerakan)	
Alliance Party	United Malays National Organisation (UMNO)	1957–1973
Barisan Nasional (BN)	United Malays National Organisation (UMNO)	1973–present
Pakatan Rakyat (PR)	People's Justice Party (PKR)	2008–2015
Pakatan Harapan (PH)	People's Justice Party (PKR)	2015–present

No.	Portrait	Name (Birth–Death) Constituency	Term of office			Party (Note: This column names only the Deputy Chief Minister's party. The state government he heads may be a complex coalition of several parties and independents; those are not listed here.)	Election	Assembly
No.	Portrait	Name (Birth–Death) Constituency	Took office	Left office	Time in office	Party	Election	Assembly
		Mustapha Hussain (born ?); MLA for Tasek Glugor	1969	1 January 1971	2 years	Gerakan	1969	3rd
		Harun Sirat (born ?); MLA for Alma	2 January 1971			Gerakan	–	3rd
		Dato'; Ibrahim Saad (born ?); MLA for Seberang Jaya	25 October 1990	1995	5 years	BN (UMNO)	1990	8th
		Dato' Seri; Mohd Shariff Omar (born ?); MLA for Permatang Berangan	1995	1999	4 years	BN (UMNO)	1995	9th
		Dato' Dr. Hilmi Yahaya (born 1948); MLA for Telok Bahang	1999	2004	5 years	BN (UMNO)	1999	10th
		Dato' Seri; Abdul Rashid Abdullah (–2018); MLA for Sungai Bakap	2004	2008	4 years	BN (UMNO)	2004	11th
		Mohammad Fairus Khairuddin (born 1976); MLA for Penanti	13 March 2008	8 April 2009	1 year, 27 days	PR (PKR)	2008	12th
		Mohammad Fairus Khairuddin (born 1976); MLA for Penanti	13 March 2008	8 April 2009	1 year, 27 days	PR (PKR)	–	12th
		Dato' Dr. Mansor Othman (born 1950); MLA for Penanti	8 April 2009	9 May 2013	4 years, 32 days	PR (PKR)	–	12th
		Dato'; Mohd Rashid Hasnon (born 1960); MLA for Pantai Jerejak	9 May 2013	15 May 2018	5 years, 7 days	PR (PKR)	2013	13th
		Dato'; Mohd Rashid Hasnon (born 1960); MLA for Pantai Jerejak	9 May 2013	15 May 2018	5 years, 7 days	PH (PKR)	–	13th
		Dato' Ir. Haji; Ahmad Zakiyuddin Abdul Rahman (born 1959); MLA for Pinang Tunggal	16 May 2018	13 August 2023	5 years, 90 days	PH (PKR)	2018	14th
		Dato' Dr. Mohamad Abdul Hamid (born ?); MLA for Batu Maung	16 August 2023	Incumbent	3 years, 55 days	PH (PKR)	2023	15th

=== Deputy Chief Minister II ===
Colour key (for political coalition/parties):

Coalition	Component party	Timeline
Pakatan Rakyat (PR)	Democratic Action Party (DAP)	2008–2015
Pakatan Harapan (PH)	Democratic Action Party (DAP)	2015–present

No.	Portrait	Name (Birth–Death) Constituency	Term of office			Party (Note: This column names only the Deputy Chief Minister's party. The state government he heads may be a complex coalition of several parties and independents; those are not listed here.)	Election	Assembly
No.	Portrait	Name (Birth–Death) Constituency	Took office	Left office	Time in office	Party	Election	Assembly
1		Prof Dr. Ramasamy Palanisamy (born 1949); MLA for Perai	13 March 2008	13 August 2023	15 years, 154 days	PR (DAP)	2008	12th
1		Prof Dr. Ramasamy Palanisamy (born 1949); MLA for Perai	13 March 2008	13 August 2023	15 years, 154 days	PR (DAP)	2013	13th
1		Prof Dr. Ramasamy Palanisamy (born 1949); MLA for Perai	13 March 2008	13 August 2023	15 years, 154 days	PH (DAP)	–	13th
1		Prof Dr. Ramasamy Palanisamy (born 1949); MLA for Perai	13 March 2008	13 August 2023	15 years, 154 days	PH (DAP)	2018	14th
2		Jagdeep Singh Deo (born 1971); MLA for Datok Keramat	16 August 2023	Incumbent	3 years, 55 days	PH (DAP)	2023	15th
