= Mohamad Noor Dawoo =

Malaysian politician

Mohamad Noor Dawoo AMP PPT
- محمد نور داوواو

Member of the Perak State Legislative Assembly for Selinsing
- In office 2018 – 19 November 2022
- Preceded by: Husin Din

Personal details
- Born: Mohamad Noor bin Dawoo
- Citizenship: Malaysian
- Party: UMNO
- Other political affiliations: Barisan Nasional
- Education: Universiti Sains Malaysia
- Occupation: Politician

Mohamad Noor bin Dawoo is a Malaysian politician. He was the Member of Perak State Legislative Assembly for Selinsing from 2018 to 2022.

== Education ==
He went to SK Seri Pinang, SMK Muzaffar Shah, SMK Doktor Burhannuddin and Lembah Pantai College. He is also a Bachelor in Humanities Studies of USM.

== Election results ==
Perak State Legislative Assembly
Year	Constituency	Candidate	Votes	Pct	Opponent(s)	Votes	Pct	Ballots cast	Majority	Turnout
2018	N12 Selinsing	Mohamad Noor Dawoo (UMNO)	5,167	35.46%	Husin Din (PAS)	5,070	34.79%	14,573	97	81.50%
2018	N12 Selinsing	Mohamad Noor Dawoo (UMNO)	5,167	35.46%	Saqif Ansorullah (AMANAH)	4,016	27.56%	14,573	97	81.50%
2022	N12 Selinsing	Mohamad Noor Dawoo (UMNO)	5,414	28.95%	Sallehuddin Abdullah (PAS)	8,693	46.48%	18,959	3,279	78.21%
2022	N12 Selinsing	Mohamad Noor Dawoo (UMNO)	5,414	28.95%	Ahmad Shaqif Ansorullah (AMANAH)	4,597	24.58%	18,959	3,279	78.21%

== Honours ==
- Perak
  - Member of the Order of the Perak State Crown (AMP) (2015)
  - Recipient of the Distinguished Conduct Medal (PPT) (2005)
