= Abdul Halim Hussain =

Malaysian politician

Yang Berbahagia Dato' Seri Abdul Halim Hussain DGPN DMPN
- عبدالحليم بن حسين

Member of the Penang State Executive Council
- In office 16 May 2018 – 13 August 2023
- Governor: Abdul Rahman Abbas (2018–2021); Ahmad Fuzi Abdul Razak (2021–2023)
- Chief Minister: Chow Kon Yeow
- Portfolio: Domestic and International Trade, Consumer Affairs & Entrepreneurship Development
- Preceded by: Mohd Rashid Hasnon (Deputy Chief Minister I, International Trade & Entrepreneurship Development); Abdul Malik Abul Kassim (Domestic Trade & Consumer Affairs)
- Succeeded by: Rashidi Zinol (Trade & Entrepreneurship Development); Portfolio abolished (Consumer Affairs)
- Constituency: Batu Maung

8th Speaker of the Penang State Legislative Assembly
- In office 8 March 2008 – 27 June 2013
- Governor: Abdul Rahman Abbas
- Chief Minister: Lim Guan Eng
- Deputy: Tan Hock Leong
- Preceded by: Yahaya Abdul Hamid
- Succeeded by: Law Choo Kiang
- Constituency: Non-MLA

Member of the Penang State Legislative Assembly for Batu Maung
- In office 9 May 2018 – 12 August 2023
- Preceded by: Abdul Malik Abul Kassim (PR–PKR)
- Succeeded by: Mohamad Abdul Hamid (PH–PKR)
- Majority: 8,317 (2018)

Personal details
- Born: Abdul Halim bin Hussain; 29 November 1960 (age 65) Penang, Federation of Malaya (now Malaysia)
- Citizenship: Malaysian
- Party: People's Justice Party (PKR)
- Other political affiliations: Pakatan Rakyat (PR) (2008–2015); Pakatan Harapan (PH) (since 2015)
- Occupation: Politician

Abdul Halim bin Hussain (born 29 November 1960) is a Malaysian politician who served as Member of the Penang State Executive Council (EXCO) in the Pakatan Harapan (PH) state administration under Chief Minister Chow Kon Yeow and Member of the Penang State Legislative Assembly (MLA) for Batu Maung from May 2018 to August 2023 as well as 8th Speaker of the Penang State Legislative Assembly from March 2008 to June 2013. He is a member of the People's Justice Party (PKR), a component party of the PH and formerly Pakatan Rakyat (PR) coalitions.

== Election results ==
Penang State Legislative Assembly
Year	Constituency	Candidate	Votes	Pct	Opponent(s)	Votes	Pct	Ballots cast	Majority	Turnout
2008	N40 Telok Bahang	Abdul Halim Hussain (PKR)	3,969	47.23%	Hilmi Yahaya (UMNO)	4,434	52.77%	8,565	465	78.82%
2013	N40 Telok Bahang	Abdul Halim Hussain (PKR)	5,233	46.45%	Shah Haedan Ayoob Hussain Shah (UMNO)	6,034	53.55%	11,453	801	87.63%
2018	N37 Batu Maung	Abdul Halim Hussain (PKR)	17,380	58.73%	Liakat Ali Mohamed Ali (UMNO)	9,063	30.62%	30,046	8,317	85.30%
2018	N37 Batu Maung	Abdul Halim Hussain (PKR)	17,380	58.73%	Saiful Lizan Md Yusoff (PAS)	3,153	10.65%	30,046	8,317	85.30%

== Honours ==
- Penang
  - Commander of the Order of the Defender of State (DGPN) – Dato' Seri (2023)
  - Companion of the Order of the Defender of State (DMPN) – Dato' (2009)
