= Azhar Ibrahim (Penang) =

Malaysian politician

Yang Berbahagia Dato' Azhar Ibrahim DMPN DSPN

State Leader of Opposition of Penang
- In office 11 March 2008 – 2013
- Governor: Abdul Rahman Abbas
- Chief Minister: Lim Guan Eng
- Preceded by: Phee Boon Poh
- Succeeded by: Jahara Hamid

Member of the Penang State Executive Council
- In office 1995–2008

Member of the Penang State Legislative Assembly for Penaga
- In office 21 October 1990 – 5 May 2013
- Preceded by: Abdul Razak Ismail (BN–UMNO)
- Succeeded by: Mohd Zain Ahmad (BN–UMNO)
- Majority: 1,231 (2008)

Personal details
- Born: 9 April 1946 Batu Gajah, Perak
- Died: 23 October 2019 (aged 73) UMMC, Kuala Lumpur
- Resting place: Tanah Perkuburan Islam, Seksyen 9, Kota Damansara, Selangor
- Party: United Malays National Organisation (UMNO)
- Other political affiliations: Barisan Nasional (BN)
- Spouse: Siti Aishah Md Yusoff
- Children: 3
- Occupation: Politician, Businessman

Azhar bin Ibrahim is a Malaysian former politician, former businessman and former civil servant who served as State Leader of Opposition of Penang from 2008 to 2013, previously a Member of the Penang State Executive Council (EXCO) for land and agriculture in the Barisan Nasional (BN) state administration under Chief Minister Koh Tsu Koon from 1995 to 2008 as well as Member of the Penang State Legislative Assembly (ADUN) for Penaga from October 1990 to May 2013. He is the former liaison secretary of the United Malays National Organisation (UMNO) in Penang, a component party of Barisan Nasional (BN) coalitions.

== Early life, family background and education ==
Azhar Ibrahim was born on 9 April 1946 in Batu Gajah, Perak. He is the eldest son of Ibrahim bin Sulaiman and Halijah binti Yeop. His father was a sailor in the Royal Malaysian Navy (TLDM).

Ibrahim furthered his studies at Sekolah Tuanku Abdul Rahman (STAR), a boarding school in Ipoh, Perak. He then obtained an Undergraduate degree from Universiti Sains Malaysia (USM), Penang and a Masters degree from Newcastle University, United Kingdom.

Through his marriage with Siti Aishah Md Yusoff, Ibrahim has three children.

== Political career ==
Ibrahim has served as Penang state EXCO from 1995 to 2008. He was elected as Penaga assembly in 1990, 1995, 1999, 2004 and 2008. After becoming Chairman of the Penang Regional Development Authority (PERDA), he was subsequently appointed as the President (Datuk Bandar) of the Seberang Perai Municipal Council (MBSP) from 1995 to 1997.

On 23 May 2010, Ibrahim announced that he would not defend the Penaga seat in the upcoming election. He has served five terms as an elected representative from 1990 to 2008 and was an Exco for three terms. He is tired of being active at night, give the young people a chance.

== Death ==
Ibrahim died on 23 October 2019 in Universiti Malaya Medical Center due to heart problems. His body was buried in the islamic cemetery in Seksyen 9, Kota Damansara.

== Election results ==
Penang State Legislative Assembly
Year	Constituency	Candidate	Votes	Pct	Opponent(s)	Votes	Pct	Ballots cast	Majority	Turnout
1990	N01 Penaga	Azhar Ibrahim (UMNO)	4,839	67.83%	Mohd Hamdan Abd Rahman (PAS)	2,295	32.17%	7,386	2,544	80.22%
1995	N01 Penaga	Azhar Ibrahim (UMNO)	6,239	67.97%	Mohd Hamdan Abd Rahman (PAS)	2,940	32.03%	9,439	3,299	79.02%
1999	N01 Penaga	Azhar Ibrahim (UMNO)	5,504	56.18%	Khazali Hussin (PAS)	4,293	43.82%	10,034	1,211	79.94%
2004	N01 Penaga	Azhar Ibrahim (UMNO)	6,707	60.05%	Subri Md Arshad (PAS)	4,462	39.95%	11,356	2,245	85.16%
2008	N01 Penaga	Azhar Ibrahim (UMNO)	6,685	55.10%	Tapiudin Hamzah (PAS)	5,454	44.90%	12,314	1,231	86.30%

== Honours ==
- Penang
  - Companion of the Order of the Defender of State (DMPN) – Dato' (2004)
  - Officer of the Order of the Defender of State (DSPN) – Dato' (1999)
