= Mohamad Abdul Hamid =

Malaysian politician and academic

Yang Berhormat Dato' Mohamad Abdul Hamid DMPN DSPN MLA
- محمد عبد الحميد

Deputy Chief Minister of Penang I
- Incumbent
- Assumed office 16 August 2023 Serving with Jagdeep Singh Deo (Deputy Chief Minister of Penang II)
- Governor: Ahmad Fuzi Abdul Razak (2023–2025); Ramli Ngah Talib (since 2025)
- Chief Minister: Chow Kon Yeow
- Preceded by: Ahmad Zakiyuddin Abdul Rahman
- Constituency: Batu Maung

Member of the Penang State Executive Council
- Incumbent
- Assumed office 16 August 2023
- Governor: Ahmad Fuzi Abdul Razak (2023–2025); Ramli Ngah Talib (since 2025)
- Chief minister: Chow Kon Yeow
- Portfolio: Islamic Development, Education, Higher Education & Social Unity
- Preceded by: Ahmad Zakiyuddin Abdul Rahman (Islamic Development); Ramasamy Palanisamy (Education); Portfolios established (Higher Education & Social Unity)
- Constituency: Batu Maung

Member of the Penang State Legislative Assembly for Batu Maung
- Incumbent
- Assumed office 12 August 2023
- Preceded by: Abdul Halim Hussain (PH–PKR)
- Majority: 3,221 (2023)

Rector of the Penang International Islamic College of Technology
- Incumbent
- Assumed office 2 January 2020
- Preceded by: Mustapa Kassim

Faction represented in Penang State Legislative Assembly
- 2023–: Pakatan Harapan

Personal details
- Born: Mohamad Abdul Hamid Bertam, Penang, Malaysia
- Party: People's Justice Party (PKR)
- Other political affiliations: Pakatan Harapan (PH)
- Education: International Islamic University Malaysia (IIUM)
- Occupation: Politician
- Profession: Academic

Mohamad bin Abdul Hamid is a Malaysian politician and academic who has served as the Deputy Chief Minister of Penang I and Member of the Penang State Executive Council (EXCO) in the Pakatan Harapan (PH) state administration under Chief Minister Chow Kon Yeow as well as Member of the Penang State Legislative Assembly (MLA) for Batu Maung since August 2023. He is a member and State Chairman of Penang of the People's Justice Party (PKR), a component party of the PH coalition. He has also served as Rector of the Penang International Islamic College of Technology since January 2020.

== Political career ==
=== Deputy Chief Minister of Penang I and Member of the Penang State Executive Council (since 2023) ===
In the 2023 Penang state election, the ruling PH and Barisan Nasional (BN) retained the two-thirds supermajority in the Penang State Legislative Assembly and was reelected to power. State Chairman of PH and the Democratic Action Party (DAP) of Penang Chow was reappointed the Chief Minister on 13 August 2023. Mohamad was appointed the Deputy Chief Minister of Penang I and Member of the Penang State EXCO in charge of Islamic Development, Education, Higher Education and Social Unity by Chow on 16 August 2023.

==== Cancellation of a concert ====
On 24 August 2023, Mohamad, as the Penang EXCO Member in charge of Islamic Development, requested the Seberang Perai City Council (MBSP) to cancel the approval for the "Viral Lagu-lagu TikTok Malaysia Indonesia Concert" (Indonesia Malaysia Viral TikTok Songs Concert) that was going to be held in Kepala Batas on 30 September 2023 after the concert was asked to be cancelled by Member of Parliament (MP) for Kepala Batas Siti Mastura Mohamad and MLA for Bertam Reezal Merican Naina Merican. Mohamad explained that the cancellation was decided as to take the sentiments of the Muslims into consideration as it was going to be held only two days after the Maulidur Rasul. The cancellation received praises from the netizens. However, the concert organiser had requested to move to the location of the concert to Batu Kawan. On 25 August 2023, Chief Minister and MP for Batu Kawan Chow reverted the cancellation and approved the request. Despite this, the relocation received criticisms and questions from President of the Malaysian Chinese Association (MCA) and Wee Ka Siong and Vice President and State Chairman of MCA of Penang Tan Teik Cheng.

=== Member of the Penang State Legislative Assembly (since 2023) ===
In the 2023 state election, Mohamad made his electoral debut after being nominated by PH to contest the Batu Maung state seat. He won the seat and was elected into the Penang State Legislative Assembly as the Batu Maung MLA after defeating Azahari Aris of Perikatan Nasional (PN) by the majority of 3,221 votes.

== Election results ==
Penang State Legislative Assembly
Year	Constituency	Candidate	Votes	Pct	Opponent(s)	Votes	Pct	Ballots cast	Majority	Turnout
2023	N37 Batu Maung	Mohamad Abdul Hamid (PKR)	18,939	54.65%	Azahari Aris (BERSATU)	15,718	45.35%	34,657	3,221	73.39%

== Honours ==
- Penang
  - Companion of the Order of the Defender of State (DMPN) – Dato' (2024)
  - Officer of the Order of the Defender of State (DSPN) – Dato' (2022)
