= Selinsing =

Political subdivision in Malaysia

Selinsing (N12)
Perak constituency

State constituency
- Legislature: Perak State Legislative Assembly
MLA
Sallehuddin Abdullah
PN
- Constituency created: 2004
- First contested: 2004
- Last contested: 2022

Demographics
- Electors (2022): 24,241

Selinsing is a state constituency in Perak, Malaysia, that has been represented in the Perak State Legislative Assembly.

== Demographics ==
Ethnic breakdown of Selinsing's electorate as of 2022
1. Malay (72.2%)
2. Chinese (18.7%)
3. Indian (8.88%)
4. Other ethnicities (0.27%)

== History ==
=== Polling districts ===
According to the federal gazette issued on 31 October 2022, the Selinsing constituency is divided into 14 polling districts.

State constituency	Polling Districts	Code	Location
Selinsing (N12）	Jalan Siakap	058/12/01	SMK Alang Iskandar
Selinsing (N12）	Kampong Kedah	058/12/02	SJK (T) Ladang Kalumpong
Selinsing (N12）	Kuala Gula	058/12/03	SK Kuala Gula
Selinsing (N12）	Selinsing	058/12/04	SK Seri Pinang
Selinsing (N12）	Parit Haji Tahir	058/12/05	SK Teluk Medan
Selinsing (N12）	Parit Gabis	058/12/06	SK Teluk Medan
Selinsing (N12）	Telok Medan	058/12/07	SMK Abu Bakar Al Baqir
Selinsing (N12）	Sungai Gedong	058/12/08	SJK (T) Ladang Gedong
Selinsing (N12）	Simpang Ampat Semanggol	058/12/09	SA Rakyat Azharul Jannah
Selinsing (N12）	Parit 3 Selinsing	058/12/10	SK Seri Pinang
Selinsing (N12）	Jalan Gula	058/12/11	SMK Mudazffar Shah
Selinsing (N12）	Kampong Dew	058/12/12	SMK Selinsing
Selinsing (N12）	Simpang Tiga	058/12/13	SK Dato' Alauddin
Selinsing (N12）	Bukit Putus	058/12/14	SR Islam Al-Ehya Asshariff

=== Representation history ===
Members of the Legislative Assembly for Selinsing
Assembly	No	Years	Name	Party
Constituency created from Gunong Semanggol and Kuala Sepetang
11th	N12	2004-2008	Zaili Cha	BN (UMNO)
12th	N12	2008-2013	Husin Din	PR (PAS)
13th	N12	2013-2018	Husin Din	PR (PAS)
14th	N12	2018-2022	Mohamad Noor Dawoo	BN (UMNO)
15th	N12	2022–present	Sallehuddin Abdullah	PN (PAS)

== Election results ==
Perak state election, 2022: Selinsing
Party	Candidate	Votes	%	∆%
PN	Sallehuddin Abdullah	8,693	46.48	▲46.48
BN	Mohamad Noor Dawoo	5,414	28.95	▼7.30
PH	Ahmad Shaqif Ansarallah Ahmad Jihbaz Mokhlis	4,597	24.58	▲24.58
Total valid votes		18,704	100.00	
Total rejected ballots		228		
Unreturned ballots		27		
Turnout		18,959	78.21	▼3.29
Registered electors		24,241		
Majority		3,279	17.53	▲16.85
PN gain from BN		Swing		?

Perak state election, 2018: Selinsing
Party	Candidate	Votes	%	∆%
BN	Mohamad Noor Dawoo	5,167	36.25	▼11.16
PAS	Husin Din	5,070	35.57	▼17.02
PKR	Saqif Ansorullah	4,016	28.18	▲28.18
Total valid votes		14,253	97.80	
Total rejected ballots		232	1.59	
Unreturned ballots		88	0.60	
Turnout		14,573	81.50	▼3.00
Registered electors		17,882		
Majority		97	0.68	▼4.48
BN gain from PAS		Swing		?
Source(s) "RESULTS OF CONTESTED ELECTION AND STATEMENTS OF THE POLL AFTER THE OFFICIAL ADDITION OF VOTES".

Perak state election, 2013: Selinsing
Party	Candidate	Votes	%	∆%
PAS	Husin Din	8,215	52.59	▲0.27
BN	Sharudin Ahmad	7,406	47.41	▼0.27
Total valid votes		15,621	98.13	
Total rejected ballots		280	1.76	
Unreturned ballots		18	0.11	
Turnout		15,919	84.50	▲8.51
Registered electors		18,839		
Majority		809	5.16	▲0.51
PAS hold		Swing		
Source(s) "KEPUTUSAN PILIHAN RAYA UMUM DEWAN UNDANGAN NEGERI".

Perak state election, 2008: Selinsing
Party	Candidate	Votes	%	∆%
PAS	Husin Din	6,149	52.32	▲11.66
BN	Zaili Cha	5,602	47.67	▼11.66
Total valid votes		11,751	95.43	
Total rejected ballots		301	2.44	
Unreturned ballots		262	2.13	
Turnout		12,314	75.99	▲2.72
Registered electors		16,204		
Majority		547	4.65	▲14.03
PAS gain from BN		Swing		?
Source(s) "KEPUTUSAN PILIHAN RAYA UMUM DEWAN UNDANGAN NEGERI PERAK BAGI TAHUN 2008".

Perak state election, 2004: Selinsing
Party	Candidate	Votes	%
BN	Zaili Cha	6,876	59.34
PAS	Ahmad Awang	4,711	40.66
Total valid votes		11,587	98.03
Total rejected ballots		221	1.87
Unreturned ballots		12	0.10
Turnout		11,820	73.27
Registered electors		16,133	
Majority		2,165	18.68
This was a new constituency created.
Source(s) "KEPUTUSAN PILIHAN RAYA UMUM DEWAN UNDANGAN NEGERI PERAK BAGI TAHUN 2004".
