= Jagdeep Singh Deo =

Malaysian politician and lawyer

Yang Berhormat Tuan Jagdeep Singh Deo MLA
- ਜਗਦੀਪ ਸਿੰਘ ਦਿਓ
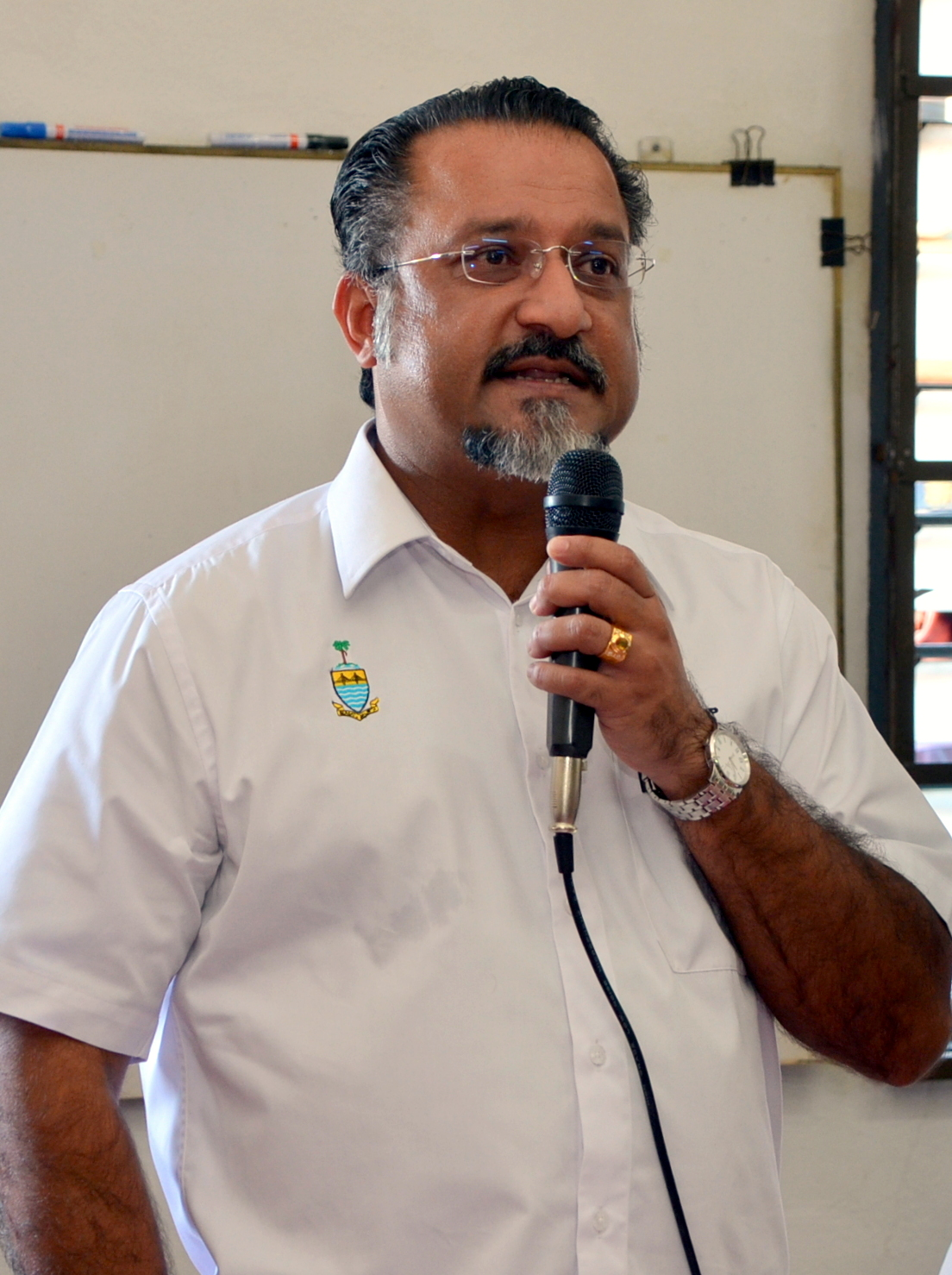

Deputy Chief Minister of Penang II
- Incumbent
- Assumed office 16 August 2023 Serving with Mohamad Abdul Hamid (Deputy Chief Minister of Penang I)
- Governor: Ahmad Fuzi Abdul Razak (2023–2025); Ramli Ngah Talib (since 2025)
- Chief Minister: Chow Kon Yeow
- Preceded by: Ramasamy Palanisamy
- Constituency: Datok Keramat

Member of the Penang State Executive Council
- Incumbent
- Assumed office 16 August 2023
- Governor: Ahmad Fuzi Abdul Razak (2023–2025); Ramli Ngah Talib (since 2025)
- Chief Minister: Chow Kon Yeow
- Portfolio: Human Capital Development, Science and Technology
- Preceded by: Ramasamy Palanisamy (Human Capital Development); Portfolios established (Science and Technology)
- Constituency: Datok Keramat
- In office 16 May 2018 – 13 August 2023
- Governor: Abdul Rahman Abbas (2018–2021); Ahmad Fuzi Abdul Razak (2021–2023)
- Chief Minister: Chow Kon Yeow
- Portfolio: Local Government, Housing, Town and Country Planning
- Preceded by: Chow Kon Yeow (Local Government); Himself (Housing, Town and Country Planning)
- Succeeded by: Sundarajoo Somu (Housing); Jason H'ng Mooi Lye (Local Government & Town and Country Planning)
- In office 9 May 2013 – 15 May 2018
- Governor: Abdul Rahman Abbas (2013–2021); Ahmad Fuzi Abdul Razak (2021–2023)
- Chief Minister: Lim Guan Eng
- Portfolio: Housing, Town and Country Planning
- Preceded by: Wong Hon Wai
- Succeeded by: Himself (Housing, Town and Country Planning)
- Constituency: Datok Keramat

Member of the Penang State Legislative Assembly for Datok Keramat
- Incumbent
- Assumed office 8 March 2008
- Preceded by: Ong Thean Lye (BN–GERAKAN)
- Majority: 1,855 (2008); 5,020 (2013); 9,561 (2018); 8,344 (2023)

Personal details
- Born: Jagdeep Singh Deo s/o Karpal Singh; 3 May 1971 (age 54) Penang, Malaysia
- Citizenship: Malaysian
- Party: Democratic Action Party (DAP) (since 1994)
- Other political affiliations: Gagasan Rakyat (GR) (1994–1996); Barisan Alternatif (BA) (1999–2004); Pakatan Rakyat (PR) (2008–2015); Pakatan Harapan (PH) (since 2015)
- Relations: Gobind Singh Deo (brother); Ramkarpal Singh (brother)
- Parent(s): Karpal Singh (father); Gurmit Kaur (mother)
- Occupation: Politician
- Profession: Lawyer

Jagdeep Singh Deo s/o Karpal Singh (Punjabi: ਜਗਦੀਪ ਸਿੰਘ ਦਿਓ, romanized: Jagdīp Siṅgh Dio; born 3 May 1971) is a Malaysian politician and lawyer who has served as the Deputy Chief Minister of Penang II since August 2023 and Member of the Penang State Executive Council (EXCO) in the Pakatan Rakyat (PR) and Pakatan Harapan (PH) state administrations under Chief Ministers Lim Guan Eng and Chow Kon Yeow since May 2013 and Member of the Penang State Legislative Assembly (MLA) for Datok Keramat since March 2008. He is a member of the Democratic Action Party (DAP), a component party of the PH and formerly PR coalitions. He is the eldest son of Karpal Singh, former Member of Parliament (MP) for Jelutong who gained fame and rose to prominence as the 'Tiger of Jelutong'. He is also the older brother of Gobind Singh Deo, Minister of Digital and MP for Damansara as well as Ramkarpal Singh, MP for Bukit Gelugor.

== Political career ==
Jagdeep joined the Democratic Action Party (DAP) in 1994, following in the footsteps of his father, Karpal Singh. According to Jagdeep, although his father had by then established himself as a prominent DAP politician and lawyer, he was never pressured into entering the political scene, and that "it was his personal decision" to follow in his father's footsteps.

Jagdeep's first foray into politics was the 1999 Penang state election, during which he contested the Bukit Gelugor state constituency. However, he garnered only 38% of the popular vote and was defeated by Koay Kar Huah of the then ruling Barisan Nasional (BN) coalition.

In the 2008 Penang state election, Jagdeep wrested the state constituency of Datok Keramat from BN, defeating BN's incumbent Ong Thean Lye. The Pakatan Rakyat (now Pakatan Harapan) coalition, which at the time consisted of the DAP, the People's Justice Party (PKR) and the Malaysian Islamic Party (PAS), was voted into power within Penang, overthrowing the state's BN government.

Jagdeep successfully defended the Datok Keramat state constituency in the 2013 Penang state election with an increased majority. He was subsequently appointed an Executive Councillor in the Penang state government by the then Chief Minister, Lim Guan Eng. Jagdeep's portfolios included the state's committees of housing, and urban and country planning.

In the 2018 Penang state election, Jagdeep once again emerged victorious in the Datok Keramat state constituency, further increasing his majority in the process, despite facing a five-cornered tussle for the seat. Following his success, his portfolios were expanded to include Penang's local government committee.

In August 2023, Jagdeep was sworn in as Penang deputy chief minister II.

=== Executive Councillor ===
Jagdeep's tenure as a member of the Penang State Executive Council has been notable for his aggressive drive towards increasing the supply of affordable public housing within the State of Penang. Prior to the 2018 Penang state election, 25,555 units of low- and medium-cost housing had been completed in the state, approximately five times greater than the amount built by the previous Barisan Nasional (BN) administration between 1999 and 2007. In addition to the completed units, nearly 50,000 more houses were being constructed within Penang. Jagdeep often contrasted his performance with the perceived refusal by the then BN-led federal government to build affordable housing units in the state, stating that the federal authorities had "failed to physically complete even one PR1MA affordable housing unit under their affordable housing scheme in Penang". He also put in place stringent conditions for prospective home buyers, requiring, for instance, that the applicants of government-built affordable housing units within Penang should be registered voters within the state.

Among Jagdeep's other initiatives are the construction of dormitories for foreign workers within Penang and flood mitigation projects within his constituency. The former, in particular, was mooted to resolve the issue of the uptake of housing units within the state by ineligible foreigners.

== Election results ==
Penang State Legislative Assembly
Year	Constituency	Candidate	Votes	Pct	Opponent(s)	Votes	Pct	Ballots cast	Majority	Turnout
1999	N28 Bukit Gelugor	Jagdeep Singh Deo (DAP)	6,581	38.31%	Koay Kar Huah (MCA)	10,598	61.69%	17,179	4,017	73.10%
2008	N29 Datok Keramat	Jagdeep Singh Deo (DAP)	7,995	59.14%	Ong Thean Lye (Gerakan)	6,140	25.47%	19,588	1,855	73.73%
2013	N29 Datok Keramat	Jagdeep Singh Deo (DAP)	11,720	66.69%	Ong Thean Lye (Gerakan)	6,700	31.93%	18,964	5,020	85.20%
2018	N29 Datok Keramat	Jagdeep Singh Deo (DAP)	13,712	75.30%	Lee Boon Ten (Gerakan)	4,151	22.80%	18,504	9,561	81.80%
2018	N29 Datok Keramat	Jagdeep Singh Deo (DAP)	13,712	75.30%	Lim Boo Chang (MUP)	194	1.10%	18,504	9,561	81.80%
2018	N29 Datok Keramat	Jagdeep Singh Deo (DAP)	13,712	75.30%	Muhammad Majnun Abdul Wahab (IND)	146	0.80%	18,504	9,561	81.80%
2018	N29 Datok Keramat	Jagdeep Singh Deo (DAP)	13,712	75.30%	Nicholas Diane Morgan (PFP)	18	0.10%	18,504	9,561	81.80%
2023	N29 Datok Keramat	Jagdeep Singh Deo (DAP)	13,398	72.61%	Heng See Lin (Gerakan)	5,054	27.39%	18,635	8,344	69.56%

== See also ==
- Datok Keramat (state constituency)
