= Abdul Malik Abul Kassim =

Malaysian politician

Yang Berbahagia Dato' Abdul Malik Abul Kassim DMPN DSPN
- عبدالمٰلك أبوالقاسم

Chairman of the Malaysian Pineapple Industry Board
- In office 1 June 2019 – 15 May 2020
- Minister: Salahuddin Ayub (2019–2020); Ronald Kiandee (2020)
- Director-General: Ruhaida Mashhor
- Preceded by: Samsolbari Jamali
- Succeeded by: Sahruddin Jamal

Member of the Penang State Executive Council
- In office 9 May 2013 – 2018
- Governor: Abdul Rahman Abbas
- Chief Minister: Lim Guan Eng
- Portfolio: Religious Affairs, Domestic Trade and Consumer Affairs
- Preceded by: Mansor Othman (Religious Affairs); Himself (Domestic Trade and Consumer Affairs)
- Succeeded by: Ahmad Zakiyuddin Abdul Rahman (Islamic Affairs); Abdul Halim Hussain (Domestic Trade and Consumer Affairs)
- Constituency: Batu Maung
- In office 13 March 2008 – 8 May 2013
- Governor: Abdul Rahman Abbas
- Chief Minister: Lim Guan Eng
- Portfolio: Domestic Trade and Consumer Affairs
- Preceded by: Lau Chiek Tuan
- Succeeded by: Himself
- Constituency: Batu Maung

Member of the Penang State Legislative Assembly for Batu Maung
- In office 8 March 2008 – 9 May 2018
- Preceded by: Mansor Musa (BN–UMNO)
- Succeeded by: Abdul Halim Hussain (PH–PKR)
- Majority: 3,169 (2008); 3,390 (2013)

Personal details
- Born: 13 April 1954 (age 71) Penang, federation of Malaya (now Malaysia)
- Citizenship: Malaysia
- Party: People's Justice Party (PKR)
- Other political affiliations: Pakatan Harapan (PH)
- Occupation: Politician

Abdul Malik bin Abul Kassim (born 13 April 1954) is a Malaysian politician who served as Member of Penang State Executive Council (EXCO) in the Pakatan Rakyat (PR) state administration under Chief Minister Lim Guan Eng as well as Member of Penang State Legislative Assembly for Batu Maung from March 2008 to May 2018. He is a member of People's Justice Party (PKR), a component party of Pakatan Harapan (PH) and formerly Pakatan Rakyat (PR) coalitions.

His name was dropped at the 2018 general election.

== Election results ==
Penang State Legislative Assembly
Year	Constituency	Candidate	Votes	Pct	Opponent(s)	Votes	Pct	Ballots cast	Majority	Turnout
2008	N37 Batu Maung	Abdul Malik Abul Kassim (PKR)	9,571	59.90%	Norman Zahalan (UMNO)	6,402	40.10%	17,253	3,169	79.20%
2013	N37 Batu Maung	Abdul Malik Abul Kassim (PKR)	14,265	56.60%	Mansor Musa (UMNO)	10,875	43.10%	25,632	3,390	88.50%
2013	N37 Batu Maung	Abdul Malik Abul Kassim (PKR)	14,265	56.60%	Rahmad Isahak (IND)	78	0.30%	25,632	3,390	88.50%

== Honours ==
- Penang
  - Companion of the Order of the Defender of State (DMPN) – Dato' (2017)
  - Officer of the Order of the Defender of State (DSPN) – Dato' (2012)
