= Husin Din =

Malaysian politician (1953–2021)

Haji Husin Din

Member of the Perak State Legislative Assembly for Selinsing
- In office 8 March 2008 – 9 May 2018
- Preceded by: Zaili Cha
- Succeeded by: Mohamad Noor Dawoo
- Majority: 547 (2008); 809 (2013)

Personal details
- Born: 10 April 1953 Perak, Federation of Malaya (now Malaysia)
- Died: 11 June 2021 (aged 68) Taiping, Perak, Malaysia
- Citizenship: Malaysia
- Party: PAS
- Other political affiliations: Pakatan Rakyat (2013-2015); Muafakat Nasional (2019-2021); Perikatan Nasional (2020-2021)
- Occupation: Politician

Husin bin Din (10 April 1953 — 11 June 2021) was a Malaysian politician from the Malaysian Islamic Party (PAS). He served as the Member of the Perak State Legislative Assembly for Selinsing from 2008 to 2018.

Husin died of asphyxiation on 11 June 2021 at 10.45 am at Taiping Hospital at the age of 68.

== Election results ==
Perak State Legislative Assembly
Year	Constituency	Candidate	Votes	Pct	Opponent(s)	Votes	Pct	Ballots cast	Majority	Turnout
2008	N12 Selinsing	Husin Din (PAS)	6,149	51.2%	Zaili Cha (UMNO)	5,602	46.6%	12,314	547	75.99%
2013	N12 Selinsing	Husin Din (PAS)	8,215	51.7%	Sharudin Ahmad (UMNO)	7,406	46.6%	15,919	809	84.50%
2018	N12 Selinsing	Husin Din (PAS)	5,070	28.4%	Mohamad Noor Dawoo (UMNO)	5,167	28.9%	14,573	97	81.5%
2018	N12 Selinsing	Husin Din (PAS)	5,070	28.4%	Ahmad Saqif Ansorullah (AMANAH)	4,016	22.5%	14,573	97	81.5%
