= Penaga =

Penaga (N01)
Penang constituency

State constituency
- Legislature: Penang State Legislative Assembly
MLA
Mohd Yusni Mat Piah
PN
- Constituency created: 1974
- First contested: 1974
- Last contested: 2023

Demographics
- Electors (2023): 25,468
- Area (km²): 39

Penaga is a state constituency in Penang, Malaysia, that has been represented in the Penang State Legislative Assembly.

The state constituency was first contested in 1974 and is mandated to return a single Assemblyman to the Penang State Legislative Assembly under the first-past-the-post voting system. Since 2018, the State Assemblyman for Penaga is Mohd Yusni Mat Piah from the Malaysian Islamic Party (PAS).

== Definition ==
=== Polling districts ===
According to the federal gazette issued on 30 March 2018, the Penaga constituency is divided into 9 polling districts.

State constituency	Polling districts	Code	Location
Penaga (N01)	Kuala Muda	041/01/01	SK Kuala Muda
Penaga (N01)	Pulau Mertajam	041/01/02	SK Pulau Mertajam
Penaga (N01)	Pasir Gebu	041/01/03	SK Pasir Gebu
Penaga (N01)	Penaga	041/01/04	SMK Sri Muda
Penaga (N01)	Kota Aur	041/01/05	SMK Pmtg Tok Labu
Penaga (N01)	Permatang Janggus	041/01/06	SK Permatang Janggus
Penaga (N01)	Guar Kepah	041/01/07	Pusat Penempatan Banjir Pengkalan Bongor
Penaga (N01)	Permatang Tiga Ringgit	041/01/08	SK Lahar Kepar
Penaga (N01)	Lahar Kepar	041/01/09	SK Lahar Kepar

== Demographics ==
Ethnic breakdown of Penaga's electorate as of 2023
1. Malay (93.0%)
2. Chinese (6.31%)
3. Indian (0.41%)
4. Other ethnicities (0.33%)

Total electors by polling district in 2016
Polling district	Electors
Kuala Muda	2,255
Pulau Mertajam	3,018
Pasir Gebu	1,329
Penaga	3,453
Kota Aur	2,142
Permatang Janggus	1,664
Guar Kepah	914
Permatang Tiga Ringgit	1,128
Lahar Kepar	1,230
Total	17,133
Source: Malaysian Election Commission

== History ==
Penang State Legislative Assemblyman for Penaga
Assembly	No	Years	Member	Party
Constituency created from Muda
4th	N01	1974–1978	Hassan Md. Noor	BN (UMNO)
5th	N01	1978–1982	Hassan Md. Noor	BN (UMNO)
6th	N01	1982–1986	Hassan Md. Noor	BN (UMNO)
7th	N01	1986–1990	Abdul Razak Ismail	BN (UMNO)
8th	N01	1990–1995	Azhar Ibrahim	BN (UMNO)
9th	N01	1995–1999	Azhar Ibrahim	BN (UMNO)
10th	N01	1999–2004	Azhar Ibrahim	BN (UMNO)
11th	N01	2004–2008	Azhar Ibrahim	BN (UMNO)
12th	N01	2008–2013	Azhar Ibrahim	BN (UMNO)
13th	N01	2013–2018	Mohd Zain Ahmad	BN (UMNO)
14th	N01	2018–2020	Mohd Yusni Mat Piah	PAS
14th	N01	2020–2023	Mohd Yusni Mat Piah	PN (PAS)
15th	N01	2023–present	Mohd Yusni Mat Piah	PN (PAS)

== Election results ==
Penang state election, 2023: Penaga
Party	Candidate	Votes	%	∆%
PN	Mohd Yusni Mat Piah	13,223	63.24	▲63.24
BN	Mohd Naim Salleh	7,686	36.76	▼9.64
Total valid votes		20,909	100.00	
Total rejected ballots		97		
Unreturned ballots		16		
Turnout		21,022	82.54	▼5.46
Registered electors		25,468		
Majority		5,537	26.48	▲19.28
PN hold		Swing		

Penang state election, 2018: Penaga
Party	Candidate	Votes	%	∆%
PAS	Mohd Yusni Mat Piah	8,530	53.60	▲9.10
BN	Mohd Zain Ahmad	7,398	46.40	▼9.10
Total valid votes		15,928	100.0	
Total rejected ballots		843		
Unreturned ballots		30		
Turnout		16,801	88.00	▼3.20
Registered electors		19,089		
Majority		1,132	7.20	▼3.80
PAS gain from BN		Swing		?
Source(s) "His Majesty's Government Gazette - Notice of Contested Election, State Legislative Assembly for the State of Penang [P.U. (B) 252/2018]" (PDF). Attorney General's Chambers of Malaysia. 3 May 2018. "Federal Government Gazette - Results of Contested Election and Statements of the Poll after the Official Addition of Votes, State Constituencies for the State of Penang [P.U. (B) 326/2018]" (PDF). Attorney General's Chambers of Malaysia. 28 May 2018. Archived from the original (PDF) on August 29, 2019.

Penang state election, 2013: Penaga
Party	Candidate	Votes	%	∆%
BN	Mohd Zain Ahmad	8,350	55.50	▲0.40
PAS	Rosidi Hussain	6,688	44.50	▼0.40
Total valid votes		15,038	100.00	
Total rejected ballots		168		
Unreturned ballots		0		
Turnout		15,206	91.20	▲4.90
Registered electors		16,681		
Majority		1,662	11.00	▲0.80
BN hold		Swing		
Source(s) "Federal Government Gazette - Notice of Contested Election, State Legislative Assembly for the State of Penang [P.U. (B) 189/2013]" (PDF). Attorney General's Chambers of Malaysia. 26 April 2013. "Federal Government Gazette - Results of Contested Election and Statements of the Poll after the Official Addition of Votes, State Constituencies for the State of Penang [P.U. (B) 230/2013]" (PDF). Attorney General's Chambers of Malaysia. 22 May 2013. Archived from the original (PDF) on 22 March 2019.

Penang state election, 2008: Penaga
Party	Candidate	Votes	%	∆%
BN	Azhar Ibrahim	6,685	55.10	▼4.95
PAS	Tapiudin Hamzah	5,454	44.90	▲4.95
Total valid votes		12,139	100.00	
Total rejected ballots		170		
Unreturned ballots		5		
Turnout		12,314	86.30	▲1.14
Registered electors		14,268		
Majority		1,231	10.20	▼9.90
BN hold		Swing		

Penang state election, 2004: Penaga
Party	Candidate	Votes	%	∆%
BN	Azhar Ibrahim	6,707	60.05	▲3.87
PAS	Subri Md Arshad	4,462	39.95	▼3.87
Total valid votes		11,169	100.00	
Total rejected ballots		185		
Unreturned ballots		2		
Turnout		11,356	85.16	▲5.22
Registered electors		13,335		
Majority		2,245	20.10	▲7.74
BN hold		Swing		

Penang state election, 1999: Penaga
Party	Candidate	Votes	%	∆%
BN	Azhar Ibrahim	5,504	56.18	▼11.79
PAS	Khazali Hussin	4,293	43.82	▲11.79
Total valid votes		9,797	100.00	
Total rejected ballots		236		
Unreturned ballots		1		
Turnout		10,034	79.94	▲0.92
Registered electors		12,552		
Majority		1,211	12.36	▼23.58
BN hold		Swing		

Penang state election, 1995: Penaga
Party	Candidate	Votes	%	∆%
BN	Azhar Ibrahim	6,239	67.97	▼0.14
PAS	Mohd Hamdan Abd Rahman	2,940	32.03	▲0.14
Total valid votes		9,179	100.00	
Total rejected ballots		249		
Unreturned ballots		11		
Turnout		9,439	79.02	▼1.20
Registered electors		11,945		
Majority		3,299	35.94	▲0.28
BN hold		Swing		

Penang state election, 1990: Penaga
Party	Candidate	Votes	%	∆%
BN	Azhar Ibrahim	4,839	67.83	▲3.48
PAS	Mohd Hamdan Abd Rahman	2,295	32.17	▼3.48
Total valid votes		7,134	100.00	
Total rejected ballots		252		
Unreturned ballots		11		
Turnout		7,386	80.22	▲4.51
Registered electors		9,207		
Majority		2,544	35.66	▲6.96
BN hold		Swing		

Penang state election, 1986: Penaga
Party	Candidate	Votes	%	∆%
BN	Abdul Razak Ismail	4,174	64.35	▼5.76
PAS	Mahfuz Omar	2,312	35.65	▲5.76
Total valid votes		6,486	100.00	
Total rejected ballots		252		
Unreturned ballots		0		
Turnout		6,738	75.71	▼3.37
Registered electors		8,900		
Majority		1,862	28.70	▼11.52
BN hold		Swing		

Penang state election, 1982: Penaga
Party	Candidate	Votes	%	∆%
BN	Hassan Mohd. Noh	5,968	70.11	▲8.57
PAS	Ismail Hamid	2,544	29.89	▼8.57
Total valid votes		8,512	100.00	
Total rejected ballots		237		
Unreturned ballots		0		
Turnout		8,749	79.08	▼15.65
Registered electors		11,063		
Majority		1,962	40.22	▲17.14
BN hold		Swing		

Penang state election, 1978: Penaga
Party	Candidate	Votes	%	∆%
BN	Hassan Mohd. Noh	5,231	61.54	▲61.54
PAS	Ismail Hamid	3,269	38.46	▲38.46
Total valid votes		8,500	100.00	
Total rejected ballots		483		
Unreturned ballots		0		
Turnout		8,983	94.73	
Registered electors		9,483		
Majority		1,962	23.08	
BN hold		Swing		

Penang state election, 1974: Penaga
Party	Candidate	Votes	%
On Nomination Day, Hassan Mohd. Noh won uncontested.
BN	Hassan Mohd. Noh		
Total valid votes			100.00
Total rejected ballots			
Unreturned ballots			
Turnout			
Registered electors		8,591	
Majority			
This was a new constituency created.

== See also ==
- Constituencies of Penang
