= Batu Maung (state constituency) =

Malaysian state constituency

Batu Maung (N37)
Penang constituency
- Batu Maung (olive) on Penang

State constituency
- Legislature: Penang State Legislative Assembly
MLA
Mohamad Abdul Hamid
PH
- Constituency created: 2004
- First contested: 2004
- Last contested: 2023

Demographics
- Population (2020): 63,168
- Electors (2023): 47,226
- Area (km²): 21

Batu Maung is a state constituency in Penang, Malaysia, that has been represented in the Penang State Legislative Assembly since 2004. It covers the southeastern corner of Penang Island, including the eponymous town of Batu Maung, the Penang International Airport and the newer parts of Bayan Lepas.

The state constituency was first contested in 2004 and is mandated to return a single Assemblyman to the Penang State Legislative Assembly under the first-past-the-post voting system. Since 2023, the State Assemblyman for Batu Maung is Mohamad Abdul Hamid from People's Justice Party (PKR), which is part of the state's ruling coalition, Pakatan Harapan (PH).

== Definition ==
=== Polling districts ===
According to the federal gazette issued on 30 March 2018, the Batu Maung constituency is divided into 10 polling districts.

State constituency	Polling districts	Code	Location
Batu Maung (N37)	Kampong Sungai Ara	052/37/01	SK Sungai Ara
Batu Maung (N37)	Taman Desa Ara	052/37/02	SMK Sungai Ara
Batu Maung (N37)	Sungai Tiram	052/37/03	SJK (C) Chung San
Batu Maung (N37)	Sungai Kluang	052/37/04	SK Seri Permai
Batu Maung (N37)	Kampong Naran	052/37/05	SJK (C) Wen Khai
Batu Maung (N37)	Permatang Damar Laut	052/37/06	SK Permatang Damar Laut
Batu Maung (N37)	Batu Maung	052/37/07	SK Batu Maung
Batu Maung (N37)	Taman Sri Bayan	052/37/08	SK Mutiara Perdana
Batu Maung (N37)	Taman Bukit Gedung	052/37/09	SK Seri Permai
Batu Maung (N37)	Teluk Tempoyak	052/37/10	SMK Batu Maung

The latter is the southeastern tip of Penang Island.

This state constituency is named after the town of Batu Maung, located near Teluk Tempoyak. The state seat also encompasses the newer neighbourhoods of Bayan Lepas that grew as a result of the massive industrialisation which created the Bayan Lepas Free Industrial Zone during the latter decades of the 20th century. The southern half of this manufacturing zone, as well as the Penang International Airport, falls under this constituency.

In addition, the Batu Maung constituency contains Rimau Island, an uninhabited islet south of Penang Island.

== Demographics ==
Ethnic breakdown of Batu Maung's electorate as of 2023
1. Malay (53.1%)
2. Chinese (36.1%)
3. Indian (9.50%)
4. Other ethnicities (1.27%)

Total electors by polling district in 2016
Polling district	Electors
Batu Maung	4,170
Kampung Naran	1,651
Kampung Sungai Ara	3,842
Permatang Damar Laut	4,679
Sungai Kluang	1,356
Sungai Tiram	1,773
Taman Bukit Gedung	4,728
Taman Desa Ara	5,450
Taman Sri Bayan	2,219
Teluk Tempoyak	1,182
Total	31,050
Source: Malaysian Election Commission

== History ==
Penang State Legislative Assemblyman for Batu Maung
Assembly	No	Years	Member	Party
Constituency created from Bayan Lepas and Teluk Kumbar
11th	N37	2004 – 2008	Mansor Musa	BN (UMNO)
12th	N37	2008 – 2013	Abdul Malik Abul Kassim	PR (PKR)
13th	N37	2013 – 2018	Abdul Malik Abul Kassim	PR (PKR)
14th	N37	2018 – 2023	Abdul Halim Hussain	PH (PKR)
15th	N37	2023–present	Mohamad Abdul Hamid	PH (PKR)

== Election results ==
The electoral results for the Batu Maung state constituency in 2008, 2013 and 2018 are as follows.

Penang state election, 2023
Party	Candidate	Votes	%	∆%
PH	Mohamad Abdul Hamid	18,939	54.70	▼4.00
PN	Azahari Aris	15,718	45.40	▲45.40
Total valid votes		34,657	100.00	
Total rejected ballots		213		
Unreturned ballots		52		
Turnout		34,922	73.95	▼11.35
Registered electors		47,226		
Majority		3,221	9.30	▼18.80
PH hold		Swing		

Penang state election, 2018
Party	Candidate	Votes	%	∆%
PKR	Abdul Halim Hussain	17,380	58.70	▲2.10
BN	Liakat Ali Mohamed Ali	9,063	30.60	▼12.50
PAS	Saiful Lizan Md Yusuf	3,153	10.70	▲10.70
Total valid votes		29,596	100.00	
Total rejected ballots		352		
Unreturned ballots		98		
Turnout		30,046	85.30	▼3.20
Registered electors		35,210		
Majority		8,317	28.10	▲14.60
PKR hold		Swing		
Source(s) "His Majesty's Government Gazette - Notice of Contested Election, State Legislative Assembly for the State of Penang [P.U. (B) 252/2018]" (PDF). Attorney General's Chambers of Malaysia. 3 May 2018. "Federal Government Gazette - Results of Contested Election and Statements of the Poll after the Official Addition of Votes, State Constituencies for the State of Penang [P.U. (B) 326/2018]" (PDF). Attorney General's Chambers of Malaysia. 28 May 2018. Archived from the original (PDF) on 29 August 2019.

Penang state election, 2013
Party	Candidate	Votes	%	∆%
PKR	Abdul Malik Abul Kassim	14,265	56.60	▼3.30
BN	Mansor Musa	10,875	43.10	▲3.00
Independent	Rahmad Isahak	78	0.30	▲0.30
Total valid votes		25,218	100.00	
Total rejected ballots		358		
Unreturned ballots		56		
Turnout		25,632	88.50	▲9.30
Registered electors		28,946		
Majority		3,390	13.50	▼6.30
PKR hold		Swing		
Source(s) "Federal Government Gazette - Notice of Contested Election, State Legislative Assembly for the State of Penang [P.U. (B) 189/2013]" (PDF). Attorney General's Chambers of Malaysia. 26 April 2013. "Federal Government Gazette - Results of Contested Election and Statements of the Poll after the Official Addition of Votes, State Constituencies for the State of Penang [P.U. (B) 230/2013]" (PDF). Attorney General's Chambers of Malaysia. 22 May 2013. Archived from the original (PDF) on 22 March 2019.

Penang state election, 2008
Party	Candidate	Votes	%	∆%
PKR	Abdul Malik Abul Kassim	9,571	59.90	▲30.65
BN	Norman Zahalan	6,402	40.10	▼30.65
Total valid votes		15,973	100.00	
Total rejected ballots		267		
Unreturned ballots		1,013		
Turnout		17,253	79.20	▲1.92
Registered electors		21,785		
Majority		3,169	19.84	▼21.62
PKR gain from BN		Swing		?

Pulau Pinang election, 2004
Party	Candidate	Votes	%
BN	Mansor Musa	10,386	70.73
PKR	Lim Eng Nam	4,298	29.27
Total valid votes		14,684	100.00
Total rejected ballots		466	
Unreturned ballots		0	
Turnout		15,150	77.28
Registered electors		19,605	
Majority		6,088	41.46
This was a new constituency created.

== See also ==
- Constituencies of Penang
