= Datok Keramat (state constituency) =

Constituency in Malaysia

Datok Keramat (N29)
Penang constituency
- Datok Keramat (olive) on Penang

State constituency
- Legislature: Penang State Legislative Assembly
MLA
Jagdeep Singh Deo
PH
- Constituency created: 1974
- First contested: 1974
- Last contested: 2023

Demographics
- Electors (2023): 26,791
- Area (km²): 3

Datok Keramat is a state constituency in Penang, Malaysia, that has been represented in the Penang State Legislative Assembly since 1974. It covers a part of George Town proper, including the eponymous urban district colloquially known as Dato Keramat.

The state constituency was first contested in 1974 and is mandated to return a single Assemblyman to the Penang State Legislative Assembly under the first-past-the-post voting system. Since 2008, the State Assemblyman for Sungai Pinang is Jagdeep Singh Deo from the Democratic Action Party (DAP), which is part of the state's ruling coalition, Pakatan Harapan (PH).

== Definition ==
=== Polling districts ===
According to the federal gazette issued on 30 March 2018, the Datok Keramat constituency is divided into 9 polling districts.

State constituency	Polling districts	Code	Location
Datok Keramat (N29)	Jalan York	050/29/01	SMJK Union
Datok Keramat (N29)	Sekolah Free	050/29/02	SMK Penang Free
Datok Keramat (N29)	Taman Sekolah Free	050/29/03	SJK (C) Han Chiang
Datok Keramat (N29)	Taman Abdidin	050/29/04	SJK (C) Sum Sun
Datok Keramat (N29)	Jalan Perak	050/29/05	Sekolah Jepun Pulau Pinang
Datok Keramat (N29)	Caunter Hall	050/29/06	SMK Abdullah Munshi
Datok Keramat (N29)	City Stadium	050/29/07	SMK (P) Sri Mutiara
Datok Keramat (N29)	Kampong Makam	050/29/08	SJK (C) Tong Sian
Datok Keramat (N29)	Jalan Kajang	050/29/09	SJK (C) Convent Datuk Keramat

This state seat encompasses the western part of George Town's city centre, including much of Dato Keramat Road, from where the constituency got its name. Also located within the Datok Keramat seat are some of the city's major landmarks and institutions, such as the City Stadium, Penang Free School and The Residency, the latter of which is the official residence of the governor of Penang.

The Datok Keramat state constituency is bounded to the north by Western Road (now Jalan Utama) and Dato Keramat Road. However, it stops just short of Penang Times Square, which comes under the neighbouring Komtar constituency. To the south, the constituency extends up to Free School Road just south of Penang Free School, thus covering the residential area around the historic school and east of Green Lane. Both Green Lane and Scotland Road also form the constituency's western limits.

== Demographics ==
Ethnic breakdown of Datok Keramat's electorate as of 2023
1. Chinese (55.4%)
2. Malay (27.0%)
3. Indian (16.5%)
4. Other ethnicities (1.03%)

Total electors by polling district in 2016
Polling district	Electors
Caunter Hall	2,281
City Stadium	2,388
Jalan Kajang	1,503
Jalan Perak	3,805
Jalan York	1,803
Kampong Makam	2,778
Sekolah Free	1,891
Taman Sekolah Free	3,685
Taman Abidin	1,900
Total	22,034
Source: Malaysian Election Commission

== History ==
Penang State Legislative Assemblyman for Datok Keramat
Assembly	No	Years	Member	Party
Constituency created from Tanjong Barat, Tanjong Utara, Kelawai and Dhoby Ghaut
4th	N25	1974 – 1978	Teh Ewe Lim (郑耀林)	BN (GERAKAN)
5th	N25	1978 – 1982	Teh Ewe Lim (郑耀林)	BN (GERAKAN)
6th	N25	1982 – 1986	Teh Ewe Lim (郑耀林)	BN (GERAKAN)
7th	N25	1986 – 1990	Ooi Ean Kwong (黄炎光)	BN (GERAKAN)
8th	N25	1990 – 1995	K. Balasundaram	GR (DAP)
9th	N25	1995 – 1999	Lim Boo Chang (林武灿)	BN (GERAKAN)
10th	N25	1999 – 2004	Lim Boo Chang (林武灿)	BN (MCA)
11th	N29	2004 – 2008	Ong Thean Lye (汪天来)	BN (GERAKAN)
12th	N29	2008 – 2013	Jagdeep Singh Deo	PR (DAP)
13th	N29	2013 – 2018	Jagdeep Singh Deo	PR (DAP)
14th	N29	2018 – 2023	Jagdeep Singh Deo	PH (DAP)
15th	N29	2023–present	Jagdeep Singh Deo	PH (DAP)

== Election results ==
The electoral results for the Datok Keramat state constituency in 2008, 2013 and 2018 are as follows.

Penang state election, 2023
Party	Candidate	Votes	%	∆%
PH	Jagdeep Singh Deo	13,398	72.60	▼2.70
PN	Heng See Lin	5,054	27.40	▲27.40
Total valid votes		18,452	100.00	
Total rejected ballots		152		
Unreturned ballots		31		
Turnout		18,635	69.56	▼12.24
Registered electors		26,791		
Majority		8,344	45.20	▼7.30
PH hold		Swing		

Penang state election, 2018
Party	Candidate	Votes	%	∆%
PKR	Jagdeep Singh Deo	13,712	75.30	▲75.30
BN	Lee Boon Ten	4,151	22.80	▼13.60
BERSAMA	Lim Boo Chang	194	1.10	▲1.10
Independent	Muhammad Majnun Abdul Wahab	146	0.80	▲0.80
Penang Front Party	Nicholas Diane Morgan	18	0.00	
Total valid votes		18,221	100.00	
Total rejected ballots		216		
Unreturned ballots		67		
Turnout		18,504	81.80	▼4.00
Registered electors		22,630		
Majority		9,561	52.50	▲25.30
PKR hold		Swing		
Source(s) "His Majesty's Government Gazette - Notice of Contested Election, State Legislative Assembly for the State of Penang [P.U. (B) 252/2018]" (PDF). Attorney General's Chambers of Malaysia. 3 May 2018. "Federal Government Gazette - Results of Contested Election and Statements of the Poll after the Official Addition of Votes, State Constituencies for the State of Penang [P.U. (B) 326/2018]" (PDF). Attorney General's Chambers of Malaysia. 28 May 2018. Archived from the original (PDF) on 2019-08-29.

Penang state election, 2013
Party	Candidate	Votes	%	∆%
DAP	Jagdeep Singh Deo	11,720	63.60	▲7.00
BN	Ong Thean Lye	6,700	36.40	▼7.00
Total valid votes		18,420	100.00	
Total rejected ballots		274		
Unreturned ballots		92		
Turnout		18,786	85.80	▲9.20
Registered electors		21,900		
Majority		5,020	27.20	▲14.00
DAP hold		Swing		
Source(s) "Federal Government Gazette - Notice of Contested Election, State Legislative Assembly for the State of Penang [P.U. (B) 189/2013]" (PDF). Attorney General's Chambers of Malaysia. 26 April 2013. "Federal Government Gazette - Results of Contested Election and Statements of the Poll after the Official Addition of Votes, State Constituencies for the State of Penang [P.U. (B) 230/2013]" (PDF). Attorney General's Chambers of Malaysia. 22 May 2013. Archived from the original (PDF) on 2019-03-22.

Penang state election, 2008
Party	Candidate	Votes	%	
DAP	Jagdeep Singh Deo	7,995	56.60	▲24.83
BN	Ong Thean Lye	6,140	43.40	▼24.83
Total valid votes		14,135	100.00	
Total rejected ballots		308		
Unreturned ballots		1		
Turnout		14,444	76.60	▲1.51
Registered electors		18,852		
Majority		1,855	13.20	▼23.24
DAP gain from BN		Swing		?

Penang state election, 2004
Party	Candidate	Votes	%	∆%
BN	Ong Thean Lye	9,462	68.22	▲7.02
DAP	Koid Teng Guan	4,407	31.78	▼7.02
Total valid votes		13,869	100.00	
Total rejected ballots		342		
Unreturned ballots		29		
Turnout		14,240	72.23	▲0.18
Registered electors		19,715		
Majority		5,055	36.45	▲14.04
BN hold		Swing		

Penang state election, 1999
Party	Candidate	Votes	%	∆%
BN	Lim Boo Chang	8,599	61.20	▼6.41
DAP	Karpal Singh Ram Singh	5,451	38.80	▲7.06
Total valid votes		14,050	100.00	
Total rejected ballots		364		
Unreturned ballots		13		
Turnout		14,427	72.04	▼2.17
Registered electors		20,025		
Majority		3,148	22.41	▼13.48
BN hold		Swing		

Penang state election, 1995
Party	Candidate	Votes	%	∆%
BN	Lim Boo Chang	9,974	67.62	▲20.88
DAP	Wong Hang Yoke	4,681	31.73	▼21.53
PBS	Seevaraju Muniandy	96	0.65	▲0.65
Total valid votes		14,751	100.00	
Total rejected ballots		245		
Unreturned ballots		42		
Turnout		15,038	74.21	▲0.83
Registered electors		20,263		
Majority		5,293	35.88	▲29.35
BN gain from DAP		Swing		-

Penang state election, 1990
Party	Candidate	Votes	%	∆%
DAP	Balasundaram Kanagaratnam	7,591	53.27	▲6.94
BN	Denis Mark Lee Kin Yeng	6,660	46.73	▼6.94
Total valid votes		14,251	100.00	
Total rejected ballots		253		
Unreturned ballots		24		
Turnout		14,528	73.38	▲4.70
Registered electors		19,797		
Majority		931	6.53	▼0.82
GR gain from BN		Swing		-

Penang state election, 1986
Party	Candidate	Votes	%	∆%
BN	Ooi Ean Kwong	6,918	53.68	▼12.48
DAP	Ong Hock Aun	5,970	46.32	▲16.93
Total valid votes		12,888	100.00	
Total rejected ballots		262		
Unreturned ballots		0		
Turnout		13,150	68.68	▼5.00
Registered electors		19,146		
Majority		948	7.36	▼29.41
BN hold		Swing		

Penang state election, 1982
Party	Candidate	Votes	%	∆%
BN	Teh Ewe Lim	9,619	66.16	▼3.42
DAP	Ooi Soo Toe	4,273	29.39	▲23.31
PAS	Md. Azis Ishak	647	4.45	▲4.45
Total valid votes		14,539	100.00	
Total rejected ballots		265		
Unreturned ballots		0		
Turnout		14,804	73.68	▼3.12
Registered electors		20,091		
Majority		5,346	36.77	▼8.46
BN hold		Swing		

Penang state election, 1978
Party	Candidate	Votes	%	∆%
BN	Teh Ewe Lim	9,002	69.58	▲12.95
Independent	Lim Kah Pin	3,150	24.35	▲22.95
DAP	Khoo Teng Kok	786	6.08	▼19.47
Total valid votes		12,938	100.00	
Total rejected ballots		507		
Unreturned ballots		0		
Turnout		13,445	76.81	▼3.26
Registered electors		17,505		
Majority		5,852	45.23	▲14.15
BN hold		Swing		

Penang state election, 1974
Party	Candidate	Votes	%
BN	Teh Ewe Lim	5,826	56.62
DAP	Gooi Hock Seng	2,628	25.54
PEKEMAS	Tan Seng Keat	1,431	13.91
Parti Sosialis Rakyat Malaysia	Ong Yu Ching	260	2.53
Independent	Ng Moon Leong	144	1.40
Total valid votes		10,289	100.00
Total rejected ballots		387	
Unreturned ballots		0	
Turnout		10,676	80.07
Registered electors		13,334	
Majority		3,198	31.08
This was a new constituency created.

== See also ==
- Constituencies of Penang
