= Zulkifli Ibrahim =

Malaysian politician

- ذوالکفل إبراهيم

Member of the Penang State Legislative Assembly for Sungai Acheh
- In office 9 May 2018 – 6 March 2023
- Preceded by: Mahmud Zakaria (BN–UMNO)
- Succeeded by: Rashidi Zinol (BN–UMNO)
- Majority: 416 (2018)

Personal details
- Born: Zulkifli bin Ibrahim; 30 November 1979 (age 46) Nibong Tebal, Penang, Malaysia
- Citizenship: Malaysian
- Party: People's Justice Party (PKR) (–2020); Malaysian United Indigenous Party (BERSATU) (since 2020)
- Other political affiliations: Pakatan Harapan (PH) (–2020); Perikatan Nasional (PN) (since 2020)
- Parent(s): Ibrahim Abdul Razak (father); Sopiah Omar (mother)
- Education: University of Technology Malaysia
- Occupation: Politician

Zulkifli bin Ibrahim (born 30 November 1979) is a Malaysian politician who served as Member of the State Legislative Assembly (MLA) for Sungai Acheh from May 2018 to March 2023. He is a member of the Malaysian United Indigenous Party (BERSATU), a component party of the Perikatan Nasional (PN) coalition and was a member of the People's Justice Party (PKR), a component party of the Pakatan Harapan (PH) coalition.

== Education ==
He has studied in Methodist Nibong Tebal Primary and Secondary School, and in Nibong Tebal Technical School. He got his Diploma in Marine Technology Engineering from UTM.

== Politics ==
Zulkifli started his political career as the Political Secretary for the by-then Nibong Tebal MP, Goh Kheng Huat in 1999. He is also one of the hosts during the launch of PKR in Renaissance Kuala Lumpur Hotel on 4 April 1999. He is also one of the co-founders of Keadilan Penang together with Zaki and Mansor Othman.

In 2000, he was appointed as the Spokesperson of the Youth Wing of Keadilan Penang. He was also a Member of Keadilan Youth Wing Committee.

He is also one of the Youth leader that wanted Saifuddin Nasution Ismail to be chosen as the Deputy Chief of the Youth Wing of Keadilan instead of Mustaffa Kamil Ayub, who was seen to be too weak when several Youth leaders of Keadilan had been arrested under the ISA.

On 29 June 2020, PKR Chairman of Disciplinary Committee, Datuk Ahmad Kassim had announced that Zulkifli is expelled from PKR as he supported the Perikatan Nasional government openly and held posts from the government. On 5 July 2020, he had announced that he will join BERSATU in the near future.

== Election results ==
Penang State Legislative Assembly
Year	Constituency	Candidate	Votes	Pct.	Opponent(s)	Votes	Pct.	Ballots cast	Majority	Turnout
2018	N21 Sungai Acheh	Zulkifli Ibrahim (PKR)	7,486	43.51%	Mahmud Zakaria (UMNO)	7,070	41.09%	17,205	416	85.95%
2018	N21 Sungai Acheh	Zulkifli Ibrahim (PKR)	7,486	43.51%	Nor Zamri Latiff (PAS)	2,383	13.85%	17,205	416	85.95%
2023	N21 Sungai Acheh	Zulkifli Ibrahim (BERSATU)	9,432	49.67%	Rashidi Zinol (UMNO)	9,556	50.33%	19,138	124	73.45%

== Family ==
He was born at Nibong Tebal, Pulau Pinang on 30 November 1979 in Sungai Bakap Hospital. He is the youngest of 8 children of Haji Ibrahim bin Abd Razak and Hajah Sopiah binti Omar.
