= Thanenthiran =

Thanenthiran is a surname. Notable people with the surname include:

- R.S. Thanenthiran (born 1963), Malaysian Indian politician and businessman
- Sivananthi Thanenthiran, Malaysian writer and feminist
