= Lai Chew Hock =

Malaysian politician

Lai Chew Hock DJN
- 赖秋福

Member of the Penang State Legislative Assembly for Bukit Tambun
- In office 21 March 2004 – 8 March 2008
- Preceded by: new constituency
- Succeeded by: Law Choo Kiang (PR–PKR)
- Majority: 5,129 (2004)

Member of the Penang State Legislative Assembly for Sungai Bakap
- In office 8 November 1997 – 21 March 2004
- Preceded by: Ooi Theng Bok (BN–Gerakan)
- Succeeded by: Abdul Rashid Abdullah (BN–UMNO)
- Majority: 1,440 (1997); 2,751 (1999)

Personal details
- Born: 4 June 1965 (age 60) Penang, Malaysia
- Party: Parti Gerakan Rakyat Malaysia (Gerakan)
- Other political affiliations: Barisan Nasional (BN) (–2018); Perikatan Nasional (PN) (2021–present)

Lai Chew Hock is a Malaysian politician. He served as member of the Penang State Legislative Assembly (MLA) for Bukit Tambun from March 2004 to March 2008 as well as MLA for Sungai Bakap from November 1997 to March 2004. He is a member of Parti Gerakan Rakyat Malaysia (Gerakan) a component party of Perikatan Nasional (PN) and formerly Barisan Nasional (BN) coalitions.

He also served as Division Chief of Gerakan of the Batu Kawan.

== Incident ==
His wife Thor Joo Lee was stabbed four times to death in 2008 after the general election.

== Election results ==
Penang State Legislative Assembly
| Year | Constituency | Candidate | Votes | Pct | Opponent(s) | Votes | Pct | Ballots cast | Majority | Turnout |
|---|---|---|---|---|---|---|---|---|---|---|
| 1997 | N16 Sungai Bakap | Lai Chew Hock (Gerakan) | 5,010 | 48.34% | Goh Kheng Huat (DAP) | 3,570 | 34.45% | 10,594 | 1,440 | 63.87% |
| 1997 | N16 Sungai Bakap | Lai Chew Hock (Gerakan) | 5,010 | 48.34% | Abu Harith Ahmad (IND) | 1,758 | 16.96% | 10,594 | 1,440 | 63.87% |
| 1997 | N16 Sungai Bakap | Lai Chew Hock (Gerakan) | 5,010 | 48.34% | K. Ganesh (IND) | 26 | 0.25% | 10,594 | 1,440 | 63.87% |
| 1999 | N16 Sungai Bakap | Lai Chew Hock (Gerakan) | 8,315 | 59.91% | Maktar Shapee (keADILan) | 5,564 | 40.09% | 14,222 | 2,751 | 78.64% |
| 2004 | N18 Bukit Tambun | Lai Chew Hock (Gerakan) | 6,030 | 49.76% | Goh Kheng Huat (PKR) | 4,992 | 41.19% | 12,393 | 5,129 | 78.58% |
| 2004 | N18 Bukit Tambun | Lai Chew Hock (Gerakan) | 6,030 | 49.76% | Ng Yeow Chong (DAP) | 1,097 | 9.05% | 12,393 | 5,129 | 78.58% |
| 2013 | N18 Bukit Tambun | Lai Chew Hock (Gerakan) | 4,197 | 21.30% | Law Choo Kiang (PKR) | 15,217 | 77.50% | 19,950 | 11,020 | 88.60% |
| 2013 | N18 Bukit Tambun | Lai Chew Hock (Gerakan) | 4,197 | 21.30% | A'ziss Zainal Abiddin (IND) | 142 | 0.70% | 19,950 | 11,020 | 88.60% |
| 2013 | N18 Bukit Tambun | Lai Chew Hock (Gerakan) | 4,197 | 21.30% | Loganathan Ayyayu (IND) | 91 | 0.50% | 19,950 | 11,020 | 88.60% |

== Honours ==
- Penang
  - Member of the Order of the Defender of State (DJN) (2003)
