= Nor Zamri Latiff =

Malaysian politician (1968–2024)

- نور زمري لطيف

Member of the Penang State Legislative Assembly for Sungai Bakap
- In office 12 August 2023 – 24 May 2024
- Preceded by: Amar Pritpal Abdullah (PH–PKR)
- Succeeded by: Abidin Ismail (PN–PAS)
- Majority: 1,563 (2023)

Personal details
- Born: Nor Zamri bin Latiff; 24 September 1968
- Died: 24 May 2024 (aged 55) Seberang Jaya Hospital, Seberang Jaya, Penang, Malaysia
- Cause of death: Inflammation of stomach
- Resting place: Masjid Jamek Sungai Acheh Muslim Cemetery
- Citizenship: Malaysian
- Party: Malaysian Islamic Party (PAS)
- Other political affiliations: Perikatan Nasional (PN)
- Spouse: Musalmah Yusop
- Children: 6
- Occupation: Politician

Nor Zamri bin Latiff (24 September 1968 – 24 May 2024) was a Malaysian politician who served as Member of the Penang State Legislative Assembly (MLA) for Sungai Bakap from August 2023 to his death in office in May 2024. He was a member and Division Chief of Nibong Tebal of the Malaysian Islamic Party (PAS), a component party of the Perikatan Nasional (PN) coalition. He is the shortest-serving Sungai Bakap MLA in the history, in office for slightly more than 9 months.

== Death ==
Nor Zamri died due to the inflammation of stomach on 24 May 2024 at the age of 55 at the Seberang Jaya Hospital, Seberang Jaya, Penang, Malaysia. A by-election held on 6 July 2024 elected Abidin Ismail of PN and PAS as the new Sungai Bakap MLA.

== Election results ==
Penang State Legislative Assembly
Year	Constituency	Candidate	Votes	Pct.	Opponent(s)	Votes	Pct.	Ballots cast	Majority	Turnout
2018	N21 Sungai Acheh	Nor Zamri Latiff (PAS)	2,383	13.85%	Zulkifli Ibrahim (PKR)	7,486	43.51%	17,205	416	85.95%
2018	N21 Sungai Acheh	Nor Zamri Latiff (PAS)	2,383	13.85%	Mahmud Zakaria (UMNO)	7,070	41.09%	17,205	416	85.95%
2023	N20 Sungai Bakap	Nor Zamri Latiff (PAS)	15,433	52.69%	Nurhidayah Che Rose (PKR)	13,870	47.31%	29,530	1,563	76.88%
