= Mental health in Malaysia =

A 2015 survey indicated that almost 40% of Kuala Lumpur's residents met the criteria for a mental disorder

Mental health in Malaysia encompasses the prevalence, social and economic burden, and treatment of mental health disorders in Malaysia.

Studies have indicated a high prevalence of mental disorders among adolescents and adults in Malaysia. For example, a 2015 survey indicated that almost 40% of adults in the Malaysian capital Kuala Lumpur met the criteria for a mental disorder. Furthermore, the prevalence of mental disorders among the Malaysian population was found to have increased three-fold between 1996 and 2015. This has been attributed to rapid cultural and lifestyle changes, which has led to an increased level of perceived stress among Malaysia's population.

== Adolescent mental health ==
=== 2022 National Health and Morbidity Survey ===
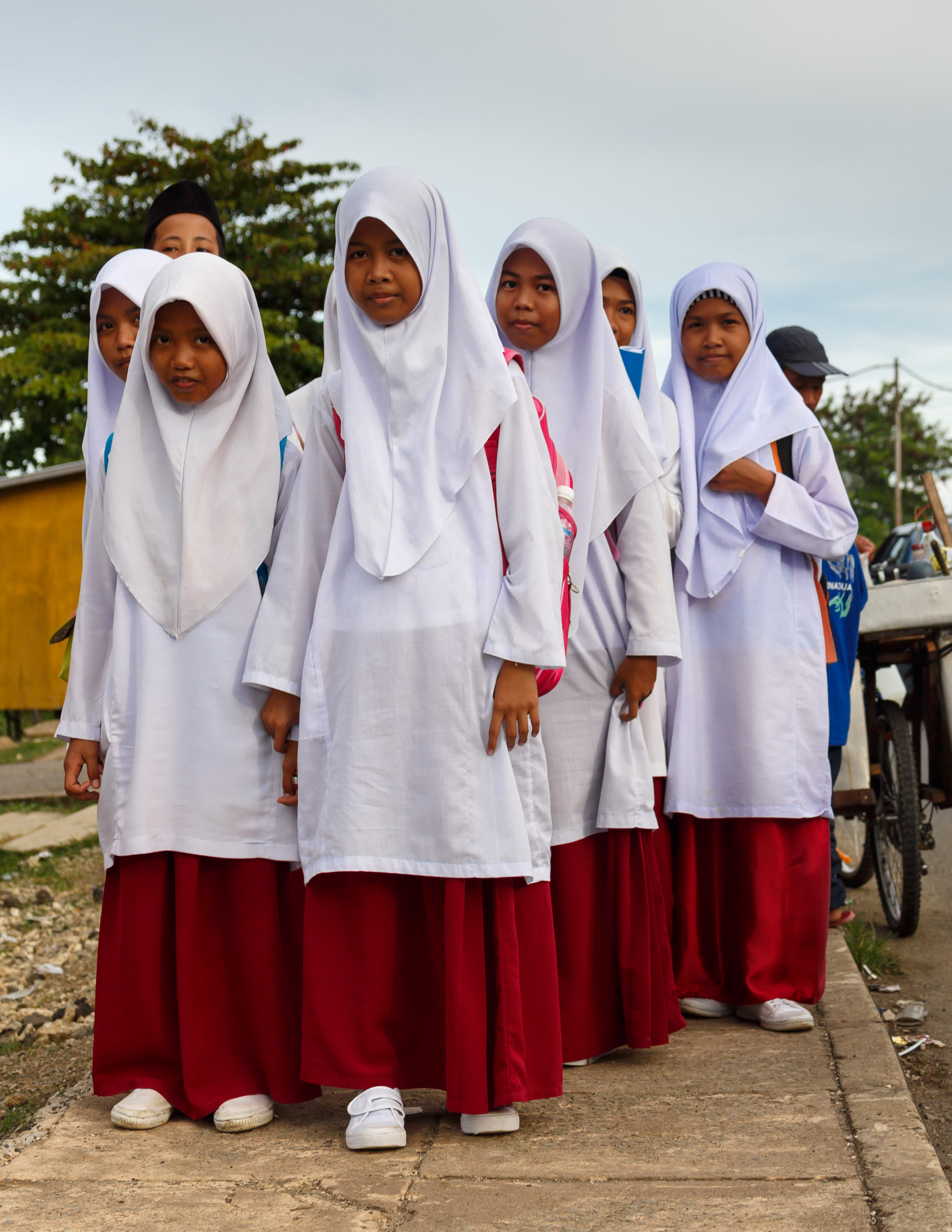
Female students in Malaysia are more likely than male students to experience depression, loneliness and suicidal ideation.

A 2022 survey conducted by the Ministry of Health indicated that the prevalence of mental disorders, loneliness and suicidal ideation had increased among Malaysian adolescents, compared to when the survey was conducted in prior years.

==== Depression ====
26.9% of the adolescents met the criteria for depression. The prevalence of depression was higher among female adolescents than male adolescents, with 36.1% of females experiencing depression, compared to 17.7% of males.

==== Loneliness ====
16.2% of adolescents reporting feeling lonely "most of the time or always". The prevalence of loneliness was significantly higher among female adolescents, than male adolescents, with 20.3% of females reporting feeling lonely, compared to 11.6% of males.

==== Suicide ====
- 13.1% of adolescents experienced suicidal ideation (18.5% of females and 7.6% of males)
- 10% of adolescents made a suicide plan (14.3% of females and 5.7% of males)
- 9.5% of adolescents attempted suicide (13.4% of females and 5.7% of males)

==== Healthy Mind Screening programme ====
In October 2025, Malaysia’s Ministry of Education announced that the school-based Healthy Mind Screening programme would be conducted twice a year (previously once a year) to improve the early detection of depression and psychological distress among students and to streamline referrals to the Ministry of Health and other relevant services. The Education Minister, Fadhlina Sidek, told Parliament that parental involvement is essential because students spend a limited amount of time in school, and she noted that the reform was prompted in part by parliamentary discussions referencing the Malaysian Youth Mental Health Index 2023.

== Adult mental health ==
A 2015 survey of 29,460 Malaysian adults found that 29.2% of the respondents met the criteria for a mental health disorder. In comparison, 10.7% of Malaysian adults met the criteria for a mental health disorder in 1996. Citing the Ministry of Health’s NHMS 2023, Malaysia’s mental health has worsened over the past five years. About one million Malaysians aged 16 and above are now estimated to have depression, twice as many as in 2019. The rate increased from 2.3% to 4.6%.

The prevalence of mental health disorders was 39.8% for adults living in the Malaysian capital Kuala Lumpur.

== Mental health services ==
A 2018 study found that Malaysia had ratio of 1.27 psychiatrists per 100 000 people, with the capital Kuala Lumpur having a significantly higher ratio than rural areas.

It is estimated that only 20% of Malaysians with a mental disorder will receive professional treatment. This has been attributed to social stigma about mental illness and a lack of awareness on mental health problems.
