= Defence and Home Affairs Select Committee =

Committee appointed by the Malaysian House of Representatives

The Defence and Home Affairs Select Committee (Malay: Jawatankuasa Pilihan Khas Pertahanan dan Hal Ehwal Dalam Negeri; Chinese: 馬來西亞國防與內政專責委員會; Tamil: பாதுகாப்பு மற்றும் உள்நாட்டு விவகாரங்களுக்கான சிறப்புக் குழு மலேசியா) is a select committee of the Malaysian House of Representatives, which scrutinises the Ministry of Defence and Ministry of Home Affairs. It is among six new bipartisan parliamentary select committees announced by Speaker of the House of Representatives, Mohamad Ariff Md Yusof, on 4 December 2018 in an effort to improve the institutional system.

== Membership ==
=== 14th Parliament ===
As of December 2019, the committee's current members are as follows:

Member	Party	Constituency
Nik Nazmi Nik Ahmad MP (Chairman)	PKR	Setiawangsa
Datuk Haji Abdul Rahim Bakri MP	BERSATU (Note: Abdul Rahim was initially a member of the United Malays National Organisation (UMNO) at date of appointment before later becoming an independent politician and eventually joining the Malaysian United Indigenous Party (BERSATU).)	Kudat
Chang Lih Kang MP	PKR	Tanjong Malim
Ahmad Hassan MP	WARISAN	Papar
Dato' Seri Dr. Shahidan Kassim MP	UMNO	Arau
Lim Lip Eng MP	DAP	Kepong
Pang Hok Liong MP	DAP	Labis

Former members of the committee are as follows:

Member	Party	Constituency	Successor
Dato' Takiyuddin Hassan MP	PAS	Kota Bharu	Shahidan Kassim
Dato' Dr. Mansor Othman MP	PKR	Nibong Tebal	Nik Nazmi Nik Ahmad

== Chair of the Defence and Home Affairs Select Committee ==
Chair	Party	Constituency	First elected	Method
Mansor Othman MP	PKR	Nibong Tebal	4 December 2018	Elected by the Speaker of the Dewan Rakyat
Nik Nazmi Nik Ahmad MP	PKR	Setiawangsa	4 December 2019	Elected by the Speaker of the Dewan Rakyat

== See also ==
- Parliamentary Committees of Malaysia
