= Amar Pritpal Abdullah =

Malaysian politician

Yang Berbahagia Dato' Amar Pritpal Abdullah DSPN PKT
- ਅਮਰ ਪ੍ਰਿਤਪਾਲ ਅਬਦੁੱਲਾ / عمار ڤريتڤل عبد الله

Deputy Speaker of the Penang State Legislative Assembly
- In office 2 August 2018 – 28 June 2023
- Governor: Abdul Rahman Abbas (2018–2021); Ahmad Fuzi Abdul Razak (2021–2023)
- Chief Minister: Chow Kon Yeow
- Speaker: Law Choo Kiang
- Preceded by: Maktar Shapee
- Succeeded by: Azrul Mahathir Aziz
- Constituency: Sungai Bakap

Member of the Penang State Legislative Assembly for Sungai Bakap
- In office 9 May 2018 – 12 August 2023
- Preceded by: Maktar Shapee (PR–PKR)
- Succeeded by: Nor Zamri Latiff (PN–PAS)
- Majority: 2,348 (2018)

Faction represented in Penang State Legislative Assembly
- 2018–2023: Pakatan Harapan

Personal details
- Born: Pritpal Singh a/l Amar Singh; 13 June 1959 (age 67) Penang, Federation of Malaya (now Malaysia)
- Citizenship: Malaysian
- Party: People's Justice Party (PKR)
- Other political affiliations: Pakatan Harapan (PH)
- Education: Mangalore University (MBBS)
- Occupation: Politician

Amar Pritpal bin Abdullah (born 13 June 1959) is a Malaysian politician who served as Deputy Speaker of the Penang State Legislative Assembly from August 2018 to June 2023 and Member of the Penang State Legislative Assembly (MLA) for Sungai Bakap from May 2018 to August 2023. He is a member and Division Chief of Nibong Tebal of the People's Justice Party (PKR), a component party of the Pakatan Harapan (PH) coalition.

== Election results ==
Penang State Legislative Assembly
Year	Constituency	Candidate	Votes	Pct	Opponent(s)	Votes	Pct	Ballots cast	Majority	Turnout%
2018	N20 Sungai Bakap	Amar Pritpal Abdullah (PKR)	10,386	45.57%	Mohamed Sani Bakar (UMNO)	8,038	35.26%	23,217	2,348	87.10%
2018	N20 Sungai Bakap	Amar Pritpal Abdullah (PKR)	10,386	45.57%	Osman Jaafar (PAS)	4,316	18.93%	23,217	2,348	87.10%
2018	N20 Sungai Bakap	Amar Pritpal Abdullah (PKR)	10,386	45.57%	Tan Chow Kang (PRM)	55	0.24%	23,217	2,348	87.10%

== Honours ==
- Penang
  - Officer of the Order of the Defender of State (DSPN) – Dato' (2020)
  - Recipient of the Distinguished Conduct Medal (PKT) (2016)
