= Goh Choon Aik =

Malaysian politician

Yang Berhormat Tuan Goh Choon Aik MLA
- 吴俊益

Member of the Penang State Executive Council
- Incumbent
- Assumed office 6 March 2026
- Governor: Ramli Ngah Talib
- Chief Minister: Chow Kon Yeow
- Portfolio: Trade and Community Unity
- Preceded by: Mohamad Abdul Hamid (Community Unity); Rashidi Zinol (Trade)
- Constituency: Bukit Tambun

Member of the Penang State Legislative Assembly for Bukit Tambun
- Incumbent
- Assumed office 9 May 2018
- Preceded by: Law Choo Kiang (PR–PKR)
- Majority: 14,880 (2018); 17,175 (2023)

Personal details
- Born: Goh Choon Aik; 8 February 1974 (age 52) Bandar Baharu, Kedah, Malaysia
- Citizenship: Malaysian
- Party: People's Justice Party (PKR)
- Other political affiliations: Pakatan Harapan (PH)
- Occupation: Politician

Goh Choon Aik (Chinese: 吳俊益; pinyin: Wú Jùnyì; Jyutping: Ng4 Zeon3 Jik1; Pe̍h-ōe-jī: Gô͘ Chùn-ek; born 8 February 1974) is a Malaysian politician who has served as Member of the Penang State Legislative Assembly (MLA) for Bukit Tambun since May 2018. He is a member and Division Chief of Batu Kawan of the People's Justice Party (PKR), a component party of the Pakatan Harapan (PH) coalition.

== Early career ==
He is a Registered Town Planner for 13 years and a corporate member of the Malaysia Institute of Planners. He began his career with Penang Development Corporation as Town & Country Planning Officer in 1998, before joining GCA Planning Consultants & GCA Planning Sdn Bhd in 2005, where he is currently the Principal. He also served as Municipal Councillor in Seberang Perai City Council from 2008 to 2010.

== Election results ==
Penang State Legislative Assembly
| Year | Constituency | Candidate | Votes | Pct | Opponent(s) | Votes | Pct | Ballots cast | Majority | Turnout |
|---|---|---|---|---|---|---|---|---|---|---|
| 2018 | N18 Bukit Tambun | Goh Choon Aik (PKR) | 18,064 | 80.44% | Hartini Tan Abdullah (GERAKAN) | 3,184 | 14.18% | 22,455 | 14,880 | 86.08% |
| 2018 | N18 Bukit Tambun | Goh Choon Aik (PKR) | 18,064 | 80.44% | Kumaravelu Arumugam (PAS) | 735 | 3.27% | 22,455 | 14,880 | 86.08% |
| 2018 | N18 Bukit Tambun | Goh Choon Aik (PKR) | 18,064 | 80.44% | Goh Bee Koon (PRM) | 117 | 0.52% | 22,455 | 14,880 | 86.08% |
| 2018 | N18 Bukit Tambun | Goh Choon Aik (PKR) | 18,064 | 80.44% | Ong Seong Lu (PFP) | 54 | 0.24% | 22,455 | 14,880 | 86.08% |
| 2023 | N18 Bukit Tambun | Goh Choon Aik (PKR) | 21,985 | 80.64% | Tan Gia Wei (GERAKAN) | 4,810 | 17.64% | 27,263 | 17,175 | 72.71% |
| 2023 | N18 Bukit Tambun | Goh Choon Aik (PKR) | 21,985 | 80.64% | Samuganathan Muniandy (IND) | 468 | 1.78% | 27,263 | 17,175 | 72.71% |
