= 2024 Sungai Bakap by-election =

2024 by-election in Penang, Malaysia

- 6 July 2024

N20 Sungai Bakap seat in the Penang State Legislative Assembly
- Turnout: 63.45%
	First party	Second party
	PN	PH
Candidate	Abidin Ismail	Joohari Ariffin
Party	PAS	PKR
Alliance	PN	PH
Popular vote	14,489	10,222
Percentage	58.63%	41.37%
Sungai Bakap assemblyman before election
Nor Zamri Latiff (died)
Perikatan Nasional (PAS)
Elected Sungai Bakap assemblyman
Abidin Ismail
Perikatan Nasional (PAS)

The 2024 Sungai Bakap by-election was a by-election for the Penang State Legislative Assembly seat of Sungai Bakap that was held on 6 July 2024. It was called following the death of incumbent, Nor Zamri Latiff on 24 May 2024 due to gastritis. Nor Zamri has served as Member of the Penang State Legislative Assembly for Sungai Bakap since 2023. It is the first Penang state by-election since the 2023 Penang state election.

Abidin Ismail of Perikatan Nasional (PN) defeated Joohari Ariffin of Pakatan Harapan (PH) by a significantly increased majority of 4,267 votes compared to the one won by Nor Zamri in the 2023 state election.

== Nomination ==
On 12 June 2024, Pakatan Harapan (PH) and its component party the People's Justice Party (PKR), representing the government, announced its candidate, Joohari Ariffin, who was making his electoral debut in the election. Barisan Nasional (BN), one of the major political coalitions working with PH to form the coalition governments at the federal and Penang state levels, agreed to actively campaign for the PH candidate.

Three days later on 15 June 2024, Perikatan Nasional (PN) and its component party the Malaysian Islamic Party (PAS), defending the seat in the election, named Nibong Tebal PAS vice chairman Abidin Ismail, who was also contesting in an election for the first time, as its candidate.

Both Joohari and Abidin were officially nominated on Nomination Day on 22 June 2024. The election saw a straight fight between them as no other candidates were nominated.

== Timeline ==
The key dates are listed below.

Date	Event
6 June 2024	Issue of the Writ of Election
22 June 2024	Nomination Day
22 June – 5 July 2024	Campaigning Period
2 July 2024	Early polling day for postal and overseas voters
6 July 2024	Polling Day

== Results ==
Penang state by-election, 6 July 2024: Sungai Bakap Upon the death of incumbent, Nor Zamri Latiff
Party	Candidate	Votes	%	∆%
PN	Abidin Ismail	14,489	58.63	▲5.94
PH	Joohari Ariffin	10,222	41.37	▼5.94
Total valid votes		24,711	100.00	
Total rejected ballots		208		
Unreturned ballots		4		
Turnout		24,923	63.45	▼13.03
Registered electors		39,279		
Majority		4,267	17.26	▲11.18
PN hold		Swing		11.88

== Previous results ==
Penang state election, 2023: Sungai Bakap
Party	Candidate	Votes	%	∆%
PN	Nor Zamri Latiff	15,433	52.69	▲52.69
PH	Nurhidayah Che Rose	13,870	47.31	▲1.71
Total valid votes		29,303	100.00	
Total rejected ballots		201		
Unreturned ballots		26		
Turnout		29,530	76.88	▼10.22
Registered electors		38,409		
Majority		1,563	5.38	▼4.92
PN gain from PH		Swing		?
