= Bukit Tambun (state constituency) =

State constituency in Penang, Malaysia

Bukit Tambun (N18)
Penang constituency

State constituency
- Legislature: Penang State Legislative Assembly
MLA
Goh Choon Aik
PH
- Constituency created: 1974
- First contested: 1974
- Last contested: 2023

Demographics
- Electors (2023): 37,496
- Area (km²): 66

Bukit Tambun is a state constituency in Penang, Malaysia, that has been represented in the Penang State Legislative Assembly.

The state constituency was first contested in 1974 and is mandated to return a single Assemblyman to the Penang State Legislative Assembly under the first-past-the-post voting system. Since 2018, the State Assemblyman for Bukit Tambun is Goh Choon Aik from the Parti Keadilan Rakyat (PKR), which is part of the state's ruling coalition, Pakatan Harapan (PH); and his son's name is Goh Kwan Yang.

== Definition ==
=== Polling districts ===
According to the federal gazette issued on 18 July 2023 the Bukit Tambun constituency is divided into 9 polling districts.

State constituency	Polling Districts	Code	Location
Bukit Tambun（N18）	Pulau Aman	046/18/01	Dewan Serbaguna Pulau Aman
Bukit Tambun（N18）	Batu Kawan	046/18/02	SMK Batu Kawan
Bukit Tambun（N18）	Bukit Tambun	046/18/03	SK Bkt Tambun
Bukit Tambun（N18）	Taman Merak	046/18/04	SK Taman Merak; SJK (C) Keng Koon
Bukit Tambun（N18）	Kampong Baharu	046/18/05	SMK Simpang Empat
Bukit Tambun（N18）	Ladang Valdor	046/18/06	SJK (T) Ladang Valdor
Bukit Tambun（N18）	Perkampungan Valdor	046/18/07	SMK Valdor
Bukit Tambun（N18）	Badak Mati	046/18/08	SK Bakap Indah
Bukit Tambun（N18）	Rumah Murah Valdor	046/18/09	SJK (C) Kampung Valdor

== Demographics ==
Ethnic breakdown of Bukit Tambun's electorate as of 2023
1. Chinese (62.5%)
2. Indian (19.3%)
3. Malay (17.7%)
4. Other ethnicities (0.48%)

Total electors by polling district in 2016
Polling district	Electors
Pulau Aman	194
Batu Kawan	1,679
Bukit Tambun	2,811
Taman Merak	5,254
Kampong Baharu	4,479
Ladang Valdor	809
Perkampungan Valdor	2,615
Badak Mati	3,597
Rumah Murah Valdor	1,896
Total	23,334
Source: Malaysian Election Commission

== History ==
Penang State Legislative Assemblyman for Bukit Tambun
Assembly	No	Years	Member	Party
Constituency created from Sungei Bakap
4th	N13	1974 – 1978	Ng Swee Ching (黄瑞钦)	DAP
5th	N13	1978 – 1982	Ng Swee Ching (黄瑞钦)	BN (MCA)
6th	N13	1982 – 1986	Khoo Soo Kheng (邱思庆)	BN (MCA)
Constituency split into Jawi and Sungai Bakap
Constituency created from Jawi and Sungai Bakap
11th	N18	2004 – 2008	Lai Chew Hock (赖秋福)	BN (GERAKAN)
12th	N18	2008 – 2013	Law Choo Kiang (刘子健)	PR (PKR)
13th	N18	2013 – 2015	Law Choo Kiang (刘子健)	PR (PKR)
13th	N18	2015 – 2018	Law Choo Kiang (刘子健)	PH (PKR)
14th	N18	2018 – 2023	Goh Choon Aik (吴俊益)	PH (PKR)
15th	N18	2023–present	Goh Choon Aik (吴俊益)	PH (PKR)

== Election results ==
The electoral results for the Bukit Tambun state constituency are as follows.

Penang state election, 2023
Party	Candidate	Votes	%	∆%
PH	Goh Choon Aik	21,985	80.60	▼0.90
PN	Tan Gia Wei	4,810	17.60	▲17.60
Independent	Somoganathan Muniandy	468	1.70	▲1.70
Total valid votes		27,263	100.00	
Total rejected ballots		173		
Unreturned ballots		23		
Turnout		27,459	73.23	▼12.97
Registered electors		37,496		
Majority		17,175	63.00	▼4.10
PH hold		Swing		

Penang state election, 2018
Party	Candidate	Votes	%	∆%
PKR	Goh Choon Aik	18,064	81.50	▲4.00
BN	Hartini Tan Abdullah	3,184	14.40	▼6.90
PAS	Kumaravelu Arumugam	735	3.40	▲3.40
Parti Rakyat Malaysia	Goh Bee Koon	117	0.50	▲0.50
Penang Front Party	Ong Seong Lu	54	0.20	▲0.20
Total valid votes		22,154	100.00	
Total rejected ballots		253		
Unreturned ballots		48		
Turnout		22,455	86.20	▼2.40
Registered electors		26,086		
Majority		14,880	67.10	▲10.90
PKR hold		Swing		
Source(s) "His Majesty's Government Gazette - Notice of Contested Election, State Legislative Assembly for the State of Penang [P.U. (B) 252/2018]" (PDF). Attorney General's Chambers of Malaysia. 3 May 2018. "Federal Government Gazette - Results of Contested Election and Statements of the Poll after the Official Addition of Votes, State Constituencies for the State of Penang [P.U. (B) 326/2018]" (PDF). Attorney General's Chambers of Malaysia. 28 May 2018. Archived from the original (PDF) on 29 August 2019.

Penang state election, 2013
Party	Candidate	Votes	%	∆%
PKR	Law Choo Kiang	15,217	77.50	▲9.80
BN	Lai Chew Hock	4,197	21.30	▼11.10
Independent	A'ziss Zainal Abiddin	142	0.70	▲0.70
Independent	Loganathan Ayyayu	91	0.50	▲0.50
Total valid votes		19,647	100.00	
Total rejected ballots		303		
Unreturned ballots		0		
Turnout		19,950	88.60	▲7.20
Registered electors		22,514		
Majority		11,020	56.20	▲20.90
PKR hold		Swing		
Source(s) "Federal Government Gazette - Notice of Contested Election, State Legislative Assembly for the State of Penang [P.U. (B) 189/2013]" (PDF). Attorney General's Chambers of Malaysia. 26 April 2013. "Federal Government Gazette - Results of Contested Election and Statements of the Poll after the Official Addition of Votes, State Constituencies for the State of Penang [P.U. (B) 230/2013]" (PDF). Attorney General's Chambers of Malaysia. 22 May 2013. Archived from the original (PDF) on 22 March 2019.

Penang state election, 2008
Party	Candidate	Votes	%	∆%
PKR	Law Choo Kiang	9,855	67.70	▲26.51
BN	Huan Cheng Guan	4,726	32.40	▼17.36
Total valid votes		14,581	100.00	
Total rejected ballots		235		
Unreturned ballots		10		
Turnout		14,826	81.40	▲2.82
Registered electors		18,208		
Majority		5,129	35.30	▲26.73
PKR gain from BN		Swing		?

Penang state election, 2004
Party	Candidate	Votes	%	∆%
BN	Lai Chew Hock	6,030	49.76	▼8.60
PKR	Goh Kheng Huat	4,992	41.19	▲41.19
DAP	Ng Yeow Chong	1,097	9.05	▼32.59
Total valid votes		12,119	100.00	
Total rejected ballots		270		
Unreturned ballots		4		
Turnout		12,393	78.58	▼2.29
Registered electors		15,772		
Majority		5,129	8.57	▼8.15
BN hold		Swing		

Penang state election, 1982
Party	Candidate	Votes	%	∆%
BN	Khoo Soo Kheng	4,506	58.36	▲0.24
DAP	Tan Yam Soon	3,215	41.64	▼0.24
Total valid votes		7,721	100.00	
Total rejected ballots		342		
Unreturned ballots		0		
Turnout		8,063	80.87	▼0.99
Registered electors		9,970		
Majority		1,291	16.72	▲0.48
BN hold		Swing		

Penang state election, 1978
Party	Candidate	Votes	%	∆%
BN	Ng Swee Ching	3,815	58.12	▲17.74
DAP	Koay Boon Seng	2,749	41.88	▼0.85
Total valid votes		6,564	100.00	
Total rejected ballots		354		
Unreturned ballots		0		
Turnout		6,918	81.86	▼1.94
Registered electors		8,451		
Majority		1,066	16.24	▲13.89
BN gain from DAP		Swing		?

Penang state election, 1974
Party	Candidate	Votes	%
DAP	Ng Swee Ching	2,367	42.73
BN	Teoh Kooi Sneah	2,237	40.38
PEKEMAS	V. Veerappen	936	16.90
Total valid votes		5,540	100.00
Total rejected ballots		296	
Unreturned ballots		0	
Turnout		5,836	83.80
Registered electors		7,017	
Majority		130	2.35
This was a new constituency created.

== See also ==
- Constituencies of Penang
