= Fadhlina Sidek =

Malaysian politician

Yang Berhormat Datuk Seri Fadhlina Sidek DGSM MP
- فَضْلِنَا صِدِّيق
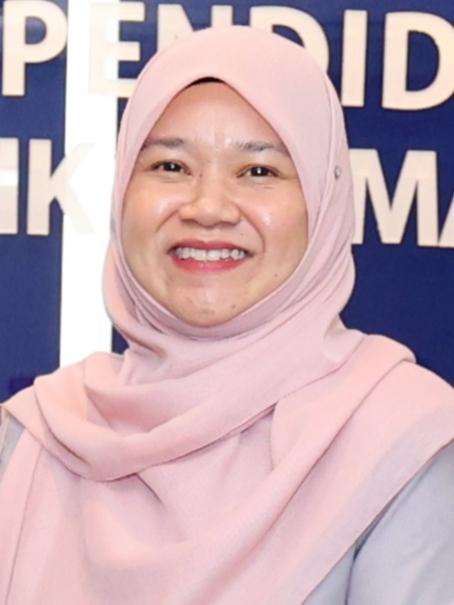

Minister of Education
- Incumbent
- Assumed office 3 December 2022
- Monarchs: Abdullah (2022–2024); Ibrahim (since 2024)
- Prime Minister: Anwar Ibrahim
- Deputy: Lim Hui Ying (2022–2023); Wong Kah Woh (since 2023)
- Preceded by: Radzi Jidin
- Constituency: Nibong Tebal

Women's Chief of the People's Justice Party
- Incumbent
- Assumed office 17 July 2022
- President: Anwar Ibrahim
- Deputy: Juwairiya Zulkifli
- Preceded by: Fuziah Salleh

Member of the Malaysian Parliament for Nibong Tebal
- Incumbent
- Assumed office 19 November 2022
- Preceded by: Mansor Othman (PN–BERSATU)
- Majority: 16,293 (2022)

Senator Elected by the Penang State Legislative Assembly
- In office 1 September 2021 – 5 November 2022 Serving with Lim Hui Ying
- Monarch: Abdullah
- Prime Minister: Ismail Sabri Yaakob
- Preceded by: Yusmadi Yusoff
- Succeeded by: Amir Md Ghazali

Personal details
- Born: Fadhlina binti Siddiq; 16 October 1977 (age 48) Bangi, Selangor, Malaysia
- Citizenship: Malaysia
- Party: People's Justice Party (PKR)
- Other political affiliations: Pakatan Harapan (PH) (since 2015)
- Spouse: Mohd Fadzli Arsad
- Children: 6
- Parent: Siddiq Fadzil (died 2021)
- Education: International Islamic University Malaysia (LLB); National University of Malaysia (LLM)
- Occupation: Politician
- Profession: Lawyer

Fadhlina Sidek (Jawi: فَضْلِنَا صِدِّيق; born 16 October 1977) is a Malaysian politician and lawyer who has served as the Minister of Education in the Unity Government administration under Prime Minister Anwar Ibrahim since December 2022 and the Member of Parliament (MP) for Nibong Tebal since November 2022. She served as a Senator from September 2021 to her resignation in November 2022. She is a member of the People's Justice Party (PKR), a component party of the PH coalition. She has also served as the Women Chief of PKR since July 2022. She is also the first female Minister of Education in Malaysian history.

Prior to her career in politics, Fadhlina was an activist and lawyer who specialized in Islamic family law and child welfare. She also had her own Sharia law firm, Tetuan Fadhlina Siddiq & Associates.

== Early life and education ==
Fadhlina is the daughter of the late Siddiq Fadzil, former President of the Malaysian Islamic Youth Movement (ABIM). She received her early education at Sekolah Rendah Kebangsaan Semenyih before completing her secondary education at Sekolah Agama Menengah Hulu Langat at Batu 10 Hulu Langat in 1994. She went on to study at the International Islamic University of Malaysia (IIUM), where she received her LLB and LLB (Sharia) degrees in 2002, and her LLM from the National University of Malaysia (UKM) in 2008.

== Career ==
Fadhlina began her political career in 2020 when she joined the PKR party and was appointed as the Chairman of the Women's Bureau of Law and Community Development. She was also elected as the party's Women's Chief in July of the same year. In September 2021, she was appointed to the Senate to represent the state of Penang.

In the 2022 general election, she was the PKR candidate for the Nibong Tebal parliamentary seat and was successful in defeating the incumbent, Mansor Othman of the PN, by a margin of 16,293 votes.

== Controversies ==
Since 2025, almost 8,000 cases of bullying, sexual assault and also deaths have been reported in schools, a rise from only 6,528 cases in 2023. Several known cases include the death of Zara Qairina, sexual assault of a student in Alor Gajah, Melaka and Baling, Kedah, and the stabbing of a student in Petaling Jaya, Selangor. Though these cases were recent, Fadhlina has been blamed by the public and even other lawmakers & politicians due to her ineffectiveness and slow to act, and was even urged to resign by the public.

== Personal life ==
Fadhlina is married to Mohd Fadzli Arsad and they have six children.

== Election results ==
Parliament of Malaysia
Year	Constituency	Candidate	Votes	Pct	Opponent(s)	Votes	Pct	Ballots cast	Majority	Turnout
2022	P047 Nibong Tebal	Fadhlina Sidek (PKR)	42,188	53.20%	Mansor Othman (BERSATU)	25,895	32.65%	79,308	16,293	79.26%
2022	P047 Nibong Tebal	Fadhlina Sidek (PKR)	42,188	53.20%	Thanenthiran Ramankutty (MMSP)	10,660	13.44%	79,308	16,293	79.26%
2022	P047 Nibong Tebal	Fadhlina Sidek (PKR)	42,188	53.20%	Goh Kheng Huat (IND)	565	0.71%	79,308	16,293	79.26%

== Honours ==
=== Honours of Malaysia ===
- Malaysia
  - Recipient of the 17th Yang di-Pertuan Agong Installation Medal (2024)
- Malacca
  - Grand Commander of the Exalted Order of Malacca (DGSM) – Datuk Seri (2026)

== See also ==
- List of people who have served in both Houses of the Malaysian Parliament
