= Azrul Mahathir Aziz =

Malaysian politician

Yang Berhormat Dato' Azrul Mahathir Aziz DSPN DJN PJM MLA
- أزرالمحاضر عزيز

Deputy Speaker of the Penang State Legislative Assembly
- Incumbent
- Assumed office 29 August 2023
- Governor: Ahmad Fuzi Abdul Razak (2023–2025); Ramli Ngah Talib (since 2025)
- Chief Minister: Chow Kon Yeow
- Speaker: Law Choo Kiang
- Preceded by: Amar Pritpal Abdullah
- Constituency: Bayan Lepas

Member of the Penang State Legislative Assembly for Bayan Lepas
- Incumbent
- Assumed office 9 May 2018
- Preceded by: Nordin Ahmad (BN–UMNO)
- Majority: 5,245 (2018); 1,889 (2023)

State Vice Chairman of the National Trust Party of Penang
- Incumbent
- Assumed office 12 October 2022
- President: Mohamad Sabu
- State Chairman: Roslan Ahmad (2022–2024); Muhammad Faiz Fadzil (since 2024)

Faction represented in the Penang State Legislative Assembly
- 2018–: Pakatan Harapan

Personal details
- Born: Azrul Mahathir bin Aziz; 28 December 1976 (age 49) Padang Rengas, Perak, Malaysia
- Party: Malaysian Islamic Party (PAS) (−2015); National Trust Party (AMANAH) (since 2015)
- Other political affiliations: Pakatan Rakyat (PR) (−2015); Pakatan Harapan (PH) (since 2015)
- Spouse: Norhailee Rasid
- Children: 5
- Occupation: Politician

Azrul Mahathir bin Aziz is a Malaysian politician who has served as the Deputy Speaker of the Penang State Legislative Assembly since August 2023 and Member of the Penang State Legislative Assembly (MLA) for Bayan Lepas since May 2018. He is a member of the National Trust Party (AMANAH), a component party of the Pakatan Harapan (PH) coalition and was a member of the Malaysian Islamic Party (PAS), a component party of the Pakatan Rakyat (PR) coalition. He has also served as the State Vice Chairman of AMANAH of Penang since October 2022 and served as the founding State Vice Youth Chief of AMANAH of Penang from 2015 to his promotion to the state vice chairmanship in October 2022. He is also presently the only AMANAH Penang MLA.

== Political career ==
=== Deputy Speaker of the Penang State Legislative Assembly (since 2023) ===
In the 2023 Penang state election, the ruling PH and Barisan Nasional (BN) retained the two-thirds supermajority in the Penang State Legislative Assembly and was reelected to power. Padang Kota MLA, State Chairman of PH and the Democratic Action Party (DAP) of Penang Chow Kon Yeow was reappointed the Chief Minister on 13 August 2023. Azrul Mahathir was nominated the Deputy Speaker of the Penang State Legislative Assembly by Chief Minister Chow and elected with a walkover on 29 August 2023.

=== Member of the Penang State Legislative Assembly (since 2018) ===
==== 2018 Penang state election ====
In the 2018 Penang state election, Azrul Mahathir made his electoral debut after being nominated by PH to contest for the Bayan Lepas state seat. He won the seat and was elected into the Penang State Legislative Assembly as the Bayan Lepas MLA for the first term after defeating Rusli Hashim of BN and Zarina Shinta Madar of Gagasan Sejahtera (GS) by a majority of 5,245 votes.

==== 2023 Penang state election ====
In the 2023 state election, Azrul Mahathir was renominated by PH to defend the Bayan Lepas state seat. He defended the seat and was reelected into the Penang State Legislative Assembly as the Bayan Lepas MLA for the second term after defeating the President of the Parti Gerakan Rakyat Malaysia (GERAKAN) Dominic Lau Hoe Chai of Perikatan Nasional (PN) by a majority of 1,889 votes.

== Personal life ==
Azrul Mahathir is married to his wife Norhailee Rasid. He owns 2 grocery shops namely the AMBA Ria in Bayan Lepas and AMBA Segar in Teluk Kumbar. AMBA stands for Azrul Mahathir Bin Aziz.

=== Attack on his wife ===
On 6 July 2023, Norhailee was aggressively hit twice on the head by a man at a grocery shop owned by Azrul Mahathir along Jalan Dato Ismail Hashim in Bayan Lepas after she approached a girl who was behaving suspiciously and ran away from the shop. The man also tried to punch Norhailee. The entire incident was captured by a closed-circuit television (CCTV). In response to the incident, Azrul Mahathir was not concerned about the alleged theft by the girl but he could not condone the attack on his wife. He also described it as unacceptable and therefore should be taken seriously. Norhailee then lodged a police report and the police added that they were investigating the case under Section 323/506 of Penal Code for causing hurt and criminal intimidation. Later the day, the man was arrested by the police in Bayan Lepas and reprimanded from 6 to 9 July 2023 for 3 days to assist in the investigation. He was also identified as a 41-year-old man and having no criminal record.

== Election results ==
Penang State Legislative Assembly
Year	Constituency	Candidate	Votes	Pct	Opponent(s)	Votes	Pct	Ballots cast	Majority	Turnout
2018	N38 Bayan Lepas	Azrul Mahathir Aziz (AMANAH)	12,504	56.17%	Rusli Hashim (UMNO)	7,259	32.61%	22,260	5,245	85.12%
2018	N38 Bayan Lepas	Azrul Mahathir Aziz (AMANAH)	12,504	56.17%	Zarina Shinta Madar (PAS)	2,497	11.22%	22,260	5,245	85.12%
2023	N38 Bayan Lepas	Azrul Mahathir Aziz (AMANAH)	15,462	53.25%	Dominic Lau Hoe Chai (Gerakan)	13,573	46.75%	29,035	1,889	73.04%

== Honours ==
- Penang
  - Officer of the Order of the Defender of State (DSPN) – Dato' (2023)
  - Member of the Order of the Defender of State (DJN)
  - Recipient of the Community Service Medal (PJM) (2017)
