= Mansor Othman =

Malaysian politician

Yang Berbahagia Dato' Mansor Othman DMPN
- منصور عثمان

Deputy Minister of Environment and Water
- In office 30 August 2021 – 24 November 2022
- Monarch: Abdullah
- Prime Minister: Ismail Sabri Yaakob
- Minister: Tuan Ibrahim Tuan Man
- Constituency: Nibong Tebal

Deputy Minister of Higher Education
- In office 10 March 2020 – 16 August 2021
- Monarch: Abdullah
- Prime Minister: Muhyiddin Yassin
- Minister: Noraini Ahmad
- Constituency: Nibong Tebal

Exco roles (Penang)
- 2009–2013: Deputy Chief Minister
- Chairman of the Religious Affairs, Entrepreneur and Co-operatives Development, Information and Community Relations

Faction represented in Dewan Rakyat
- 2013–2018: People's Justice Party
- 2018–2020: Pakatan Harapan
- 2020: Malaysian United Indigenous Party
- 2020–2022: Perikatan Nasional

Faction represented in Penang State Legislative Assembly
- 2009–2013: People's Justice Party

Personal details
- Born: Mansor bin Othman; 12 March 1950 (age 76) Kedah, Federation of Malaya (now Malaysia)
- Citizenship: Malaysian
- Party: National Justice Party (keADILan) (1999–2003); People's Justice Party (PKR) (2003–2020); Malaysian United Indigenous Party (BERSATU) (2020–present)
- Other political affiliations: Barisan Alternatif (BA) (1999–2004); Pakatan Rakyat (PR) (2008–2015); Pakatan Harapan (PH) (2015–2020); Perikatan Nasional (PN) (2020–present)
- Education: University of Science Malaysia; Yale University
- Occupation: Politician
- Profession: Lecturer
- Website: mansorothman.com

Mansor bin Othman (born 12 March 1950) (Jawi: منصور بن عثمان) is a Malaysian politician who served as the Deputy Minister of Environment and Water in the Barisan Nasional (BN) administration under former Prime Minister Ismail Sabri Yaakob and former Minister Tuan Ibrahim from August 2021 to the collapse of the BN administration in November 2022, Deputy Minister of Higher Education in the Perikatan Nasional (PN) administration under former Prime Minister Muhyiddin Yassin and former Minister Noraini Ahmad from March 2020 to the collapse of the PN administration in August 2021, Member of Parliament (MP) for Nibong Tebal from May 2013 to November 2022, Deputy Chief Minister I of Penang, Member of the Penang State Executive Council (EXCO), Member of the Penang State Legislative Assembly (MLA) for Penanti from June 2009 to May 2018 as well as Chairman of the Defence and Home Affairs Select Committee from December 2018 to December 2019. He is a member of the Malaysian United Indigenous Party (BERSATU), a component party of the PN coalition and was a member of the People's Justice Party (PKR), a component party of the Pakatan Harapan (PH) coalition.

== Political career ==
He was also chairman of PKR Penang liaison committee. He served Anwar Ibrahim as political secretary after leaving his service as senior lecturer at University of Science Malaysia. He was picked by PKR to contest the Penang State Legislative Assembly seat of Penanti in the 2009 by-election and won. In the 2013 Malaysian general election, he was nominated to contest the parliamentary seat of Nibong Tebal and won. He was re-elected in the 2018 Malaysian general election.

== Health issue ==
On 21 October 2019, Othman collapsed while debating the 2020 Malaysian federal budget, later revealed to be the result of a reflex syncope. He was caught by Subang MP Wong Chen and Ledang MP Syed Ibrahim Syed Noh before being attended to by Bandar Kuching MP Kelvin Yii Lee Wuen, who is also a doctor, and later discharged from hospital after his condition stabilised.

== Election results ==
Penang State Legislative Assembly
Year	Constituency	Candidate	Votes	Pct	Opponent(s)	Votes	Pct	Ballots cast	Majority	Turnout
2004	N10 Seberang Jaya	Mansor Othman (PKR)	5,649	35.84%	Arif Shah Omar Shah (UMNO)	10,113	64.16%	15,762	4,464	79.48%
2008	N39 Pulau Betong	Mansor Othman (PKR)	4,696	48.50%	Muhamad Farid Saad (UMNO)	4,990	51.50%	9,686	294	80.90%
2009	N12 Penanti	Mansor Othman (PKR)	6,052	85.20%	Nai-Khan Ari (IND)	494	6.90%	7,100	5,558	46.10%
2009	N12 Penanti	Mansor Othman (PKR)	6,052	85.20%	Aminah Abdullah (IND)	392	5.50%	7,100	5,558	46.10%
2009	N12 Penanti	Mansor Othman (PKR)	6,052	85.20%	Kamarul Ramizu Idris (IND)	56	0.70%	7,100	5,558	46.10%

Parliament of Malaysia
Year	Constituency	Candidate	Votes	Pct	Opponent(s)	Votes	Pct	Ballots cast	Majority	Turnout
1999	P051 Balik Pulau	Mansor Othman (keADILan)	18,467	39.83%	Mohd Zain Omar (UMNO)	27,901	60.17%	46,368	9,434	76.84%
2013	P047 Nibong Tebal	Mansor Othman (PKR)	30,003	58.03%	Zainal Abidin Osman (UMNO)	21,405	41.40%	52,599	8,598	88.63%
2013	P047 Nibong Tebal	Mansor Othman (PKR)	30,003	58.03%	Teng Kok Pheng (IND)	297	0.57%	52,599	8,598	88.63%
2018	P047 Nibong Tebal	Mansor Othman (PKR)	35,395	56.92%	Shaik Hussein Mydin (UMNO)	19,578	31.49%	63,199	15,817	86.12%
2018	P047 Nibong Tebal	Mansor Othman (PKR)	35,395	56.92%	Mohd Helmi Haron (PAS)	6,875	11.06%	63,199	15,817	86.12%
2018	P047 Nibong Tebal	Mansor Othman (PKR)	35,395	56.92%	Tan Tee Beng (IND)	331	0.53%	63,199	15,817	86.12%
2022	P047 Nibong Tebal	Mansor Othman (BERSATU)	25,895	32.65%	Fadhlina Sidek (PKR)	42,188	53.20%	80,477	16,293	79.26%
2022	P047 Nibong Tebal	Mansor Othman (BERSATU)	25,895	32.65%	Thanenthiran Ramankutty (MMSP)	10,660	13.44%	80,477	16,293	79.26%
2022	P047 Nibong Tebal	Mansor Othman (BERSATU)	25,895	32.65%	Goh Kheng Huat (IND)	565	0.71%	80,477	16,293	79.26%

== Honours ==
- Penang
  - Companion of the Order of the Defender of State (DMPN) – Dato' (2010)

== See also ==
- Defence and Home Affairs Select Committee
- 2009 Penanti by-election
- Nibong Tebal (federal constituency)
- Penanti (state constituency)
