= Penanti =

- Neighbourhood of Seberang Perai
- Location within Seberang Perai in Penang
- Coordinates: 5°24′0″N 100°29′0″E
- Country: Malaysia
- State: Penang
- City: Seberang Perai
- District: Central Seberang Perai
- Time zone: UTC+8 (MST)
  - Summer (DST): Not observed
- Postal code: 14400

Penanti is a residential neighbourhood within the city of Seberang Perai in the Malaysian state of Penang.

There was major flooding in the town in 2017.

== See also ==
- Penanti by-election, 2009
