= Abidin Ismail =

Malaysian politician and businessman

Yang Berhormat Tuan Abidin Ismail MLA
- عابدين إسماعيل

Member of the Penang State Legislative Assembly for Sungai Bakap
- Incumbent
- Assumed office 6 July 2024
- Preceded by: Nor Zamri Latiff (PN–PAS)
- Majority: 4,267 (2024)

Personal details
- Born: Abidin bin Ismail; 7 December 1968 (age 57) Sungai Duri, Sungai Bakap, Penang, Malaysia
- Citizenship: Malaysian
- Party: Malaysian Islamic Party (PAS)
- Other political affiliations: Perikatan Nasional (PN) (since 2020)
- Spouse: Fadhilah Mat Hashim
- Relations: Zalina Ismail (elder sister)
- Children: 2
- Parent: Che Rifiah Zakaria (mother)
- Occupation: Politician
- Profession: Businessman

Yang Berhormat Tuan Abidin bin Ismail (born 7 December 1968) is a Malaysian politician and businessman who has served as Member of the Penang State Legislative Assembly (MLA) for Sungai Bakap since July 2024. He is a member, Vice Division Chief of Nibong Tebal, Director of the Sungai Bakap State Legislative Assembly Elections Department (JPrD) and Head of the Workers and Consumerism Committee of Nibong Tebal of the Malaysian Islamic Party (PAS), a component party of the Perikatan Nasional (PN) coalition. He previously served as Logistics Executive of the USG Sendirian Berhad, Special Officer to previous Sungai Bakap MLA Nor Zamri Latiff as well as Head of the Publicity Committee of Nibong Tebal, Branch Chief of Sungai Duri and Branch Secretary of Sungai Duri of PAS.

== Political career ==
=== Member of the Penang State Legislative Assembly (since 2024) ===
In the 2024 Sungai Bakap by-election held on 6 July 2024 as a result of the death of incumbent MLA Nor Zamri due to his inflammation of stomach on 24 May 2024, Abidin made his electoral debut after being nominated by PN to contest in the election. Abidin won the Sungai Bakap state seat and was elected to the Penang State Legislative Assembly as the Sungai Bakap MLA after defeating Joohari Ariffin of Pakatan Harapan (PH) by a significantly increased majority of 4,267 votes, but lower turnout compared to the one won by his predecessor Nor Zamri in the 2023 Penang state election.

== Other careers ==
Abidin also holds and held a variety of roles in Sungai Duri and Nibong Tebal. He is the Chairman of the Jamek Mosque of Sungai Duri, Advisor to the Lama Mosque of Masjid Jamek, Chairman of the Ibnu Sina Resources Education Center Sungai Duri and AJK of Khidmat Malaysia of Nibong Tebal. He was also Committee Member (AJK) of the Village Development and Security Committee (JKKK) of Sungai Duri, deputy chairman and AJK of the Jamek Mosque of Sungai Duri.

== Election results ==
Penang State Legislative Assembly
Year	Constituency	Candidate	Votes	Pct.	Opponent(s)	Votes	Pct.	Ballots cast	Majority	Turnout
2024	N20 Sungai Bakap	Abidin Ismail (PAS)	14,489	58.63%	Joohari Ariffin (PKR)	10,222	41.37%	24,711	4,267	63.45%
