= Law Choo Kiang =

Malaysian politician

Yang Berhormat Dato' Seri Law Choo Kiang DGPN DMPN
- 刘子健

9th Speaker of the Penang State Legislative Assembly
- Incumbent
- Assumed office 28 June 2013
- Governor: Abdul Rahman Abbas (2013–2021); Ahmad Fuzi Abdul Razak (2021–2025); Ramli Ngah Talib (since 2025)
- Chief Minister: Lim Guan Eng (2013–2018); Chow Kon Yeow (since 2018)
- Deputy: Maktar Shapee (2013–2018); Amar Pritpal Abdullah (2018–2023); Azrul Mahathir Aziz (since 2023)
- Preceded by: Abdul Halim Hussain
- Constituency: Bukit Tambun (2013–2018); Non-MLA (since 2018)

Member of the Penang State Executive Council
- In office 13 March 2008 – 8 May 2013
- Governor: Abdul Rahman Abbas
- Chief Minister: Lim Guan Eng
- Portfolio: Agriculture, Agro-based Industries, Rural Development and Flood Mitigation
- Preceded by: Azhar Ibrahim
- Succeeded by: Afif Bahardin (Agriculture, Agro-based Industries, Rural Development); Chow Kon Yeow (Flood Mitigation)
- Constituency: Bukit Tambun

Member of the Penang State Legislative Assembly for Bukit Tambun
- In office 8 March 2008 – 9 May 2018
- Preceded by: Lai Chew Hock (BN–Gerakan)
- Succeeded by: Goh Choon Aik (PH–PKR)
- Majority: 5,129 (2008); 11,020 (2013)

Personal details
- Born: Law Choo Kiang; 5 September 1970 (age 56) Penang, Malaysia
- Citizenship: Malaysian
- Party: National Justice Party (keADILan) (2000–2003); People's Justice Party (PKR) (2003–present)
- Other political affiliations: Barisan Alternatif (BA) (1999–2004); Pakatan Rakyat (PR) (2008–2015); Pakatan Harapan (PH) (since 2015)
- Education: National Taipei University; Shanghai University
- Occupation: Politician
- Website: lawchookiang.wordpress.com

Law Choo Kiang (simplified Chinese: 刘子健; traditional Chinese: 劉子健; Pe̍h-ōe-jī: Lâu Chú-kiān; pinyin: Liú Zǐ Jiàn; Jyutping: Lau4 Zi2 Gin6; born 5 September 1970) is a Malaysian politician who has served as 9th Speaker of the Penang State Legislative Assembly since June 2013. He served as Member of the Penang State Executive Council (EXCO) in the Pakatan Rakyat (PR) and Pakatan Harapan (PH) state administrations under former Chief Minister Lim Guan Eng from March 2008 to May 2013 and Member of the Penang State Legislative Assembly (MLA) for Bukit Tambun from March 2008 to May 2018. He is a member and State Advisor of Penang of the People's Justice Party (PKR), a component party of the PH and formerly PR coalitions. He is also the longest-serving Speaker of the Penang Assembly in history.

== Education ==
He obtained his formal education from Jit Sin Independent High School, Bukit Mertajam and his Bachelor of Business Administration from the National Taipei University, Taiwan in 1994. He has also obtained postgraduate degree in Mass Communication from Shanghai University.

== Political career ==
He joined National Justice Party (formerly known, prior changing to People's Justice Party) in 2000. He was appointed the Chairman of People's Justice Party's Communication Bureau. He was the Chairman for People's Justice Party's branch of Bukit Mertajam.

Law Choo Kiang was appointed a Penang Exco member to handle Agricultural and Non-Urban Development portfolio in 2008. He was appointed speaker for the Penang State Legislative Assembly in 2013.

== Election results ==
Parliament of Malaysia
Year	Constituency	Candidate	Votes	Pct	Opponent(s)	Votes	Pct	Ballots cast	Majority	Turnout
2004	P046 Batu Kawan	Law Choo Kiang (PKR)	6,552	20.64%	Huan Cheng Guan (Gerakan)	17,097	53.85%	32,559	8,998	75.62%
2004	P046 Batu Kawan	Law Choo Kiang (PKR)	6,552	20.64%	Tanasekharan Autherapady (DAP)	8,099	25.51%	32,559	8,998	75.62%

Penang State Legislative Assembly
Year	Constituency	Candidate	Votes	Pct	Opponent(s)	Votes	Pct	Ballots cast	Majority	Turnout
2004	N17 Bukit Tengah	Law Choo Kiang (PKR)	3,090	30.28%	Ng Siew Lai (Gerakan)	7,116	69.72%	10,435	4,026	77.77%
2008	N18 Bukit Tambun	Law Choo Kiang (PKR)	9,855	67.70%	Huan Cheng Guan (Gerakan)	4,726	32.40%	14,826	5,129	81.40%
2013	N18 Bukit Tambun	Law Choo Kiang (PKR)	15,217	77.50%	Lai Chew Hock (Gerakan)	4,197	21.30%	19,950	11,020	88.60%
2013	N18 Bukit Tambun	Law Choo Kiang (PKR)	15,217	77.50%	A'ziss Zainal Abiddin (IND)	142	0.70%	19,950	11,020	88.60%
2013	N18 Bukit Tambun	Law Choo Kiang (PKR)	15,217	77.50%	Loganathan Ayyayu (IND)	91	0.50%	19,950	11,020	88.60%

== Honours ==
- Penang
  - Commander of the Order of the Defender of State (DGPN) – Dato' Seri (2024)
  - Companion of the Order of the Defender of State (DMPN) – Dato' (2013)
