= 2009 Penanti by-election =

Election in Malaysia

← 2008	31 May 2009	2013 →

Penanti seat in the Penang State Legislative Assembly
	PKR	IND	IND
Candidate	Mansor Othman	Nai Khan Ari Nai Keow	Aminah Abdullah
Party	PKR	Independent	Independent
Alliance	PR
Popular vote	6,052	494	392
Percentage	86.53%	7.06%	5.6%
	IND
Candidate	Kamarul Ramizu Idris
Party	Independent
Popular vote	56
Percentage	0.8%
Penanti assemblyman before election
Mohammad Fairus Khairuddin
PKR
Elected Penanti assemblyman
Mansor Othman
PKR

An election to fill the state assembly seat for Penanti was held on 31 May 2009. Penanti has 15,384 registered voters, with 73% of them Malays, 24% Chinese, 2% Indians and 0.7% of other communities. Dr Mansor Othman of the People's Justice Party (PKR) party won the election.

== Election background ==
Penang Deputy Chief Minister and state assemblyperson Mohammad Fairus Khairuddin quit the state assembly seat of Penanti, Penang regarding allegations over his non-performance in public office and corruption allegations. Fairus was however cleared of the alleged corruption links with quarry operations in the state by the Malaysian Anti-Corruption Commission (MACC).

According to the mainstream media, Opposition leader Anwar Ibrahim decided to force a by-election to allow his former political secretary Dr Mansor Othman to contest, win and automatically become Penang deputy Chief Minister. The Election Commission has set the nominations day for 23 May and polling day on 31 May for the Penanti state by-election in Penang.

Malaysian Prime Minister, Najib Razak declared an election would be a waste of economic resources. As a result, he conclude that the ruling coalition Barisan Nasional (BN) would not contest the election. It would be the first election uncontested by the ruling coalition since independence. MCA supported foregoing the by-election and awarding the opposition Pakatan Rakyat (PR) party coalition victory, as a means to reduce political tensions.

Former Prime Minister Tun Dr Mahathir Mohamad urged Barisan Nasional to contest the by-election., but Barisan Nasional supreme council announced on 18 May 2009 that the party would not contest the Penanti state assembly seat in Penang.

== Nominations ==
Penang PKR deputy chief Mansor Othman, a 54-year-old party veteran, was named the party's candidate. Three candidates ran as independents: former Penang PKR Wanita chief Aminah Abdullah, company manager Nai-Khan Ari and motivational expert Kamarul Ramizu Idris.

== By-election results ==
PKR's Dr Mansor Othman won 6,052 of the 7,100 votes cast in the Penanti by-election on 31 May 2009. Independents Nai Khan Ari, Aminah Abdullah and Kamarul Ramizu Idris obtained 494, 392 and 56 votes respectively. The polling ended with a low turnout of 46.1% or 7,100 voters despite fair weather.

Penang state by-election, 31 May 2009: Penanti The by-election was called due to the resignation of incumbent, Mohammad Fairus Khairuddin.
Party	Candidate	Votes	%	∆%
PKR	Mansor Othman	6,052	86.53	
Independent	Nai Khan Ari Nai Keow	494	7.06	
Independent	Aminah Abdullah	392	5.60	
Independent	Kamarul Ramizu Idris	56	0.80	
Total valid votes		6,994	100.00	
Total rejected ballots		107		
Unreturned ballots		1		
Turnout		7,102	46.16	
Registered electors		15,384		
Majority		5,558		
PKR hold		Swing		
Source(s) "Pilihan Raya Kecil N.12 Penanti". Election Commission of Malaysia. Archived from the original on 2018-09-19.
