= Maktar Shapee =

Malaysian politician

Yang Berbahagia Dato' Maktar Shapee DSPN AMN
- مختار شاڤعي

Deputy Speaker of the Penang State Legislative Assembly
- In office 2013–2018
- Yang di-Pertua of Penang: Abdul Rahman Abbas
- Chief Minister: Lim Guan Eng
- Speaker: Law Choo Kiang
- Preceded by: Tan Hock Leong
- Succeeded by: Amar Pritpal Abdullah

Member of the Penang State Legislative Assembly for Sungai Bakap
- In office 8 March 2008 – 9 May 2018
- Preceded by: Abdul Rashid Abdullah (BN–UMNO)
- Succeeded by: Amar Pritpal Abdullah (PH–PKR)
- Majority: 2,067 (2008); 1,805 (2013)

Personal details
- Born: 3 July 1949 (age 76) Sungai Bakap, Penang, Federation of Malaya
- Party: National Justice Party (keADILan) (1999–2003); People's Justice Party (PKR) (2003–present)
- Other political affiliations: Barisan Alternatif (BA) (1999–2004); Pakatan Rakyat (PR) (2008–2015); Pakatan Harapan (PH) (2015–present)
- Occupation: Politician

Maktar bin Shapee is a former Deputy Speaker of the Penang State Legislative Assembly and a former Member of the Penang State Legislative Assembly for Sungai Bakap from 2008 to 2018. He is a member of People's Justice Party (PKR), a component party of Pakatan Harapan (PH) and Pakatan Rakyat (PR) coalitions.

His name was dropped at the 2018 general election.

== Early life ==
Maktar Shapee was born on 3 July 1949 in Sungai Bakap, Penang.

== Education and early career ==
After completing his studies at Pondok Pokok Sena Kepala Batas School, he continued his studies at Darul Uloom Deoband, India and then to Al-Azhar University, Egypt in the field of Islamic Studies. Returned to his homeland in 1972 and served his countrymen in the teaching field at SM Tuanku Muhammad, Kuala Pilah Negeri Sembilan. In 1978 he moved to SM Perempuan St.George, Penang. After a year of service, he moved to SM Tun Syed Sheh Barakbah, Sungai Bakap. In 1994 he was promoted and served in the Penang Department of Education as a Supervisor of Islamic Education. In early 1998 he was promoted to Assistant District Education Officer, Seberang Perai Selatan.

== Political career ==
He is a member of ABIM (Malaysian Islamic Youth Movement) since 1978; was once appointed as ABIM Chairman of Seberang Perai Selatan District & Deputy YDP of Penang ABIM. Later, he was elected as a member of the Malaysian Scholars' Association, Penang (PUMPP) and entrusted with the position of PUMPP Secretary.

Maktar Shapee made his first electoral debut at Sungai Bakap seat, however he lost to Gerakan candidate Lai Chew Hock in 1999 general election. In 2004 general election, he once again lost to UMNO candidate Abdul Rashid Abdullah in the same seat. In 2008 general election, he was finally elected as MLA of Sungai Bakap, defeating Abdul Rashid Abdullah, who was the Deputy Chief Minister of Penang. In 2012, he was appointed as the Deputy Chairman of the Penang Islamic Religious Council. He retained his seat in 2013 and was appointed as the Deputy Speaker of the Penang State Legislative Assembly.

== Election results ==
Penang State Legislative Assembly
Year	Constituency	Candidate	Votes	Pct	Opponent(s)	Votes	Pct	Ballots cast	Majority	Turnout
1999	N16 Sungai Bakap	Maktar Shapee (keADILan)	5,564	40.09%	Lai Chew Hock (Gerakan)	8,315	59.91%	14,222	2,751	78.64%
2004	N20 Sungai Bakap	Maktar Shapee (PKR)	3,697	39.37%	Abdul Rashid Abdullah (UMNO)	5,693	60.63%	9,602	1,996	78.31%
2008	N20 Sungai Bakap	Maktar Shapee (PKR)	6,976	58.70%	Abdul Rashid Abdullah (UMNO)	4,909	41.30%	12,087	2,067	80.44%
2013	N20 Sungai Bakap	Maktar Shapee (PKR)	9,258	55.40%	Mohd Foad Mat Isa (UMNO)	7,453	44.60%	16,967	1,805	89.06%

== Honours ==
- Malaysia
  - Member of the Order of the Defender of the Realm (AMN) (1997)
- Penang
  - Officer of the Order of the Defender of State (DSPN) – Dato' (2014)
