= Bayan Lepas (state constituency) =

State constituency in Penang, Malaysia

Bayan Lepas (N38)
Penang constituency
- Bayan Lepas (olive) on Penang

State constituency
- Legislature: Penang State Legislative Assembly
MLA
Azrul Mahathir Aziz
PH
- Constituency created: 1959
- First contested: 1959
- Last contested: 2023

Demographics
- Electors (2023): 39,754
- Area (km²): 38

Bayan Lepas is a state constituency in Penang, Malaysia, that has been represented in the Penang State Legislative Assembly since 1959. It covers the southwestern corner of Penang Island, including the old quarter of the town of Bayan Lepas and fishing villages along the island's southern coast.

The state constituency was first contested in 1959 and is mandated to return a single Assemblyman to the Penang State Legislative Assembly under the first-past-the-post voting system. Since 2018, the State Assemblyman for Bayan Lepas is Azrul Mahathir Aziz from the National Trust Party (Amanah), which is part of the state's ruling coalition, Pakatan Harapan (PH).

== Definition ==
=== Polling districts ===
According to the federal gazette issued on 30 March 2018, the Bayan Lepas constituency is divided into 8 polling districts.

State constituency	Polling districts	Code	Location
Bayan Lepas (N38)	Taman Sungai Ara	053/38/01	SJK (C) Chong Cheng
Bayan Lepas (N38)	Bayan Lepas	053/38/02	SK Bayan Lepas
Bayan Lepas (N38)	Kampong Seronok	053/38/03	SK Bayan Lepas 2
Bayan Lepas (N38)	Sungai Batu	053/38/04	SMK Telok Kumbar
Bayan Lepas (N38)	Telok Kumbar	053/38/05	SK Telok Kumbar
Bayan Lepas (N38)	Pasir Belanda	053/38/06	SMK Telok Kumbar II
Bayan Lepas (N38)	Gertak Sanggul	053/38/07	SJK (C) Poi Eng
Bayan Lepas (N38)	Kampung Masjid	053/38/08	SK Seri Bayu

It encompasses the southwestern tip of Penang Island and much of the island's southern coastline, covering the old town centre of Bayan Lepas immediately west of the Penang International Airport. The fishing villages along the southern coastline of Penang Island, such as Teluk Kumbar and Gertak Sanggul, also fall under this constituency.

In addition, the state seat also contains Kendi Island, a rocky uninhabited islet 3.5 km (2.2 mi) south of Penang Island.

== Demographics ==
Ethnic breakdown of Bayan Lepas's electorate as of 2023
1. Malay (63.2%)
2. Chinese (30.2%)
3. Indian (5.66%)
4. Other ethnicities (0.96%)

Total electors by polling district in 2016
Polling district	Electors
Bayan Lepas	4,634
Gertak Sanggul	952
Kampung Masjid	2,219
Kampung Seronok	3,323
Pasir Belanda	1,555
Sungai Batu	2,124
Taman Sungai Ara	3,866
Telok Kumbar	4,049
Total	22,722
Source: Malaysian Election Commission

== History ==
Penang State Legislative Assemblyman for Bayan Lepas
Assembly	No	Years	Member	Party
Constituency created
1st	N15	1959 – 1964	Rifaie Salleh	Alliance (UMNO)
2nd	N15	1964 – 1969	Ismail Hashim	Alliance (UMNO)
		1969 - 1971	Assembly dissolved	
3rd	N15	1971 – 1973	Ismail Hashim	Alliance (UMNO)
3rd	N15	1973 – 1974	Ismail Hashim	BN (UMNO)
4th	N18	1974 – 1978	Khalid Ahmad Suleiman	BN (UMNO)
5th	N18	1978 – 1982	Khalid Ahmad Suleiman	BN (UMNO)
6th	N18	1982 – 1986	Mohd Zain Omar	BN (UMNO)
7th	N33	1986 – 1990	Boey Weng Keat (梅荣杰)	BN (GERAKAN)
8th	N33	1990 – 1995	Lim Chien Aun (林建安)	BN (GERAKAN)
9th	N31	1995 – 1999	Lim Chien Aun (林建安)	BN (GERAKAN)
10th	N31	1999 – 2004	Lim Chien Aun (林建安)	BN (MCA)
11th	N38	2004 – 2008	Syed Amerruddin Syed Ahmad	BN (UMNO)
12th	N38	2008 – 2013	Syed Amerruddin Syed Ahmad	BN (UMNO)
13th	N38	2013 – 2018	Nordin Ahmad	BN (UMNO)
14th	N38	2018 – 2023	Azrul Mahathir Aziz	PH (AMANAH)
15th	N38	2023–present	Azrul Mahathir Aziz	PH (AMANAH)

== Election results ==
The electoral results for the Bayan Lepas state constituency in 2008, 2013 and 2018 are as follows.

Penang state election, 2023
Party	Candidate	Votes	%	∆%
PH	Azrul Mahathir Aziz	15,462	53.25	▼2.95
PN	Dominic Lau Hoe Chai	13,573	46.75	▲46.75
Total valid votes		29,035	73.04	
Total rejected ballots		180		
Unreturned ballots		54		
Turnout		29,269	73.63	▼11.47
Registered electors		39,754		
Majority		1,889	6.50	▼17.10
PH hold		Swing		

Penang state election, 2018
Party	Candidate	Votes	%	∆%
PKR	Azrul Mahathir Aziz	12,504	56.20	▲56.20
BN	Rusli Hashim	7,259	32.60	▼18.30
PAS	Zarina Shinta Madar	2,497	11.20	▼37.20
Total valid votes		22,260	73.04	
Total rejected ballots		275		
Unreturned ballots		83		
Turnout		22,618	85.10	▼3.20
Registered electors		26,570		
Majority		5,245	23.60	▲21.10
PKR gain from BN		Swing		?
Source(s) "His Majesty's Government Gazette - Notice of Contested Election, State Legislative Assembly for the State of Penang [P.U. (B) 252/2018]" (PDF). Attorney General's Chambers of Malaysia. 3 May 2018. "Federal Government Gazette - Results of Contested Election and Statements of the Poll after the Official Addition of Votes, State Constituencies for the State of Penang [P.U. (B) 326/2018]" (PDF). Attorney General's Chambers of Malaysia. 28 May 2018. Archived from the original (PDF) on 29 August 2019.

Penang state election, 2013
Party	Candidate	Votes	%	∆%
BN	Haji Nordin Ahmad	9,408	50.90	▼0.70
PAS	Asnah Hashim	8,950	48.40	
Independent	Ooi Ah Loo @ Vellautham	126	0.70	▲0.70
Total valid votes		18,484	100.00	
Total rejected ballots		281		
Unreturned ballots		23		
Turnout		18,788	88.30	▲8.40
Registered electors		21,277		
Majority		458	2.50	▼0.70
BN hold		Swing		
Source(s) "Federal Government Gazette - Notice of Contested Election, State Legislative Assembly for the State of Penang [P.U. (B) 189/2013]" (PDF). Attorney General's Chambers of Malaysia. 26 April 2013. "Federal Government Gazette - Results of Contested Election and Statements of the Poll after the Official Addition of Votes, State Constituencies for the State of Penang [P.U. (B) 230/2013]" (PDF). Attorney General's Chambers of Malaysia. 22 May 2013. Archived from the original (PDF) on 22 March 2019.

Penang state election, 2008
Party	Candidate	Votes	%	∆%
BN	Syed Amerruddin Syed Ahmad	6,563	51.60	▼20.96
PAS	Asnah Hashim	6,164	48.40	▲48.40
Total valid votes		12,727	100.00	
Total rejected ballots		233		
Unreturned ballots		11		
Turnout		12,971	79.20	▲1.61
Registered electors		16,377		
Majority		399	3.14	▼41.86
BN hold		Swing		

Pulau Pinang election, 2004
Party	Candidate	Votes	%	∆%
BN	Syed Amerruddin Syed Ahmad	8,654	72.50	▲72.50
PKR	Amizudin Ahmat	3,283	27.50	▲27.50
Total valid votes		11,937	100.00	
Total rejected ballots		219		
Unreturned ballots		9		
Turnout		12,165	77.59	▲0.37
Registered electors		15,678		
Majority		5,371	44.99	▲23.77
BN hold		Swing		

Pulau Pinang election, 1999
Party	Candidate	Votes	%	∆%
BN	Lim Chien Aun	10,451	57.68	▼8.19
PKR	Mohideen Abdul Kader Yusoff Rawther	6,605	36.45	▲36.45
MDP	Tan Ban Yew	1,064	5.87	▲5.87
Total valid votes		18,120	100.00	
Total rejected ballots		383		
Unreturned ballots		338		
Turnout		18,841	77.22	▲0.24
Registered electors		24,398		
Majority		3,846	21.23	▼18.37
BN hold		Swing		

Pulau Pinang election, 1995
Party	Candidate	Votes	%	∆%
BN	Lim Chien Aun	11,269	65.87	▼5.75
DAP	Zulkifli Mohd Noor	4,494	26.27	▲26.27
PAS	Zolkifly Mohd Lazim	1,346	7.87	▼20.52
Total valid votes		17,109	100.00	
Total rejected ballots		382		
Unreturned ballots		30		
Turnout		17,521	76.98	▼0.58
Registered electors		22,759		
Majority		6,775	39.60	▼3.63
BN hold		Swing		

Pulau Pinang election, 1990
Party	Candidate	Votes	%	∆%
BN	Lim Chien Aun	12,578	71.61	▲17.98
PAS	Mohammad Hashim	4,986	28.39	▲28.39
Total valid votes		17,564	100.00	
Total rejected ballots		515		
Unreturned ballots		202		
Turnout		18,281	77.56	▲7.38
Registered electors		23,569		
Majority		7,592	43.22	▲35.96
BN hold		Swing		

Pulau Pinang election, 1986
Party	Candidate	Votes	%	∆%
BN	Boey Weng Keat	7,187	53.63	▲53.63
Parti Sosialis Rakyat Malaysia	Mohideen Abdul Kader Yusoff Rawther	6,214	46.37	▲10.81
Total valid votes		13,401	100.00	
Total rejected ballots		472		
Unreturned ballots		0		
Turnout		13,873	70.19	▼6.09
Registered electors		19,766		
Majority		973	7.26	▼21.63
BN hold		Swing		

Pulau Pinang election, 1982
Party	Candidate	Votes	%	∆%
BN	Mohd. Zain Omar	8,062	64.44	▼2.25
Parti Sosialis Rakyat Malaysia	Osman Din	4,448	35.56	▲7.66
Total valid votes		12,510	100.00	
Total rejected ballots		363		
Unreturned ballots		0		
Turnout		12,873	76.28	▼1.75
Registered electors		16,877		
Majority		3,614	28.89	▼9.91
BN hold		Swing		

Pulau Pinang election, 1978
Party	Candidate	Votes	%	∆%
BN	Khalid Ahmad Sulaiman	6,900	66.69	▲0.62
Parti Sosialis Rakyat Malaysia	Othman Taib	2,886	27.89	▲18.63
PAS	Omar Hassan	560	5.41	▲5.41
Total valid votes		10,346	100.00	
Total rejected ballots		360		
Unreturned ballots		0		
Turnout		10,706	78.03	▼4.24
Registered electors		13,721		
Majority		4,014	38.80	▼9.30
BN hold		Swing		

Pulau Pinang election, 1974
Party	Candidate	Votes	%	∆%
BN	Khalid Ahmad Sulaiman	5,419	66.07	▲20.49
DAP	Kee Yong Bak	1,474	17.97	▲17.97
Parti Sosialis Rakyat Malaysia	Omar Othman	760	9.27	▲9.27
Independent	Suhaimi Ismail	289	3.52	▲3.52
PEKEMAS	Nor Rashid Pin	260	3.17	▲3.17
Total valid votes		8,202	100.00	
Total rejected ballots		318		
Unreturned ballots		0		
Turnout		8,520	82.27	▲0.23
Registered electors		10,356		
Majority		3,945	48.10	▲37.35
BN gain from Alliance		Swing		-

Pulau Pinang election, 1969
Party	Candidate	Votes	%	∆%
Alliance	Ismail Hashim	3,783	45.58	▼14.87
GERAKAN	Shaik Ahmad Mohamed Ainajaree	2,891	34.83	▲34.83
PMIP	Yusof Rawa	1,626	19.59	▲13.73
Total valid votes		8,300	100.00	
Total rejected ballots		573		
Unreturned ballots		0		
Turnout		8,873	82.04	▼4.69
Registered electors		10,815		
Majority		892	10.75	▼27.49
Alliance hold		Swing		

Pulau Pinang election, 1964
Party	Candidate	Votes	%	∆%
Alliance	Ismail Hashim	5,064	60.45	▼24.31
Socialist Front	Chew Tatt Cheng @ Chew Tai Seng	1,861	22.22	▲22.22
UDP	Ismail Ibrahim	961	11.47	▲11.47
PMIP	Hussain Drani	491	5.86	▼9.38
Total valid votes		8,377	100.00	
Total rejected ballots		226		
Unreturned ballots		0		
Turnout		8,603	86.73	▲6.91
Registered electors		9,919		
Majority		3,203	38.24	▼31.29
Alliance hold		Swing		

Pulau Pinang election, 1959
Party	Candidate	Votes	%	∆%
Alliance	Rifaie Salleh	5,268	84.76	
PMIP	Abdul Aziz Nooh	947	15.24	
Total valid votes		6,215	100.00	
Total rejected ballots		184		
Unreturned ballots		0		
Turnout		6,399	79.82	
Registered electors		8,017		
Majority		4,321	69.53	
This was a new constituency created.

== See also ==
- Constituencies of Penang
