= Nibong Tebal (federal constituency) =

Federal constituency of Penang, Malaysia

Nibong Tebal (P047)
Penang constituency

Federal constituency
- Legislature: Dewan Rakyat
- MP: Fadhlina Sidek; PH
- Constituency created: 1974
- First contested: 1974
- Last contested: 2022

Demographics
- Population (2020): 122,034
- Electors (2023): 101,105
- Area (km²): 178
- Pop. density (per km²): 685.6

Nibong Tebal is a federal constituency in South Seberang Perai District, Penang, Malaysia, that has been represented in the Dewan Rakyat since 1974.

The federal constituency was created in the 1974 redistribution and is mandated to return a single member to the Dewan Rakyat under the first past the post voting system.

== Demographics ==
https://live.chinapress.com.my/ge15/parliament/PENANG

Ethnic breakdown of Nibong Tebal's electorate as of 2022
1. Malay (46.7%)
2. Chinese (34.8%)
3. Indian (17.9%)
4. Other ethnicities (0.70%)

As of 2020, Nibong Tebal has a population of 122,034 people.

Age breakdown of Nibong Tebal's electorate as of 2022
1. 18-20 (6.98%)
2. 21-29 (22.6%)
3. 30-39 (20.9%)
4. 40-49 (17.9%)
5. 50-59 (15.1%)
6. 60-69 (9.84%)
7. 70-79 (4.96%)
8. 80-89 (1.38%)
9. above 90 (0.24%)
Gender breakdown of Nibong Tebal's electorate as of 2022
1. Male (48.7%)
2. Female (51.3%)

== History ==
=== Polling districts ===
According to the federal gazette issued on 18 July 2023, the Nibong Tebal constituency is divided into 25 polling districts.

State constituency	Polling districts	Code	Location
Jawi (N19)	Changkat	047/19/01	SK Keledang Jaya
Jawi (N19)	Perkampungan Jawi	047/19/02	SJK (C) Kampung Jawi
Jawi (N19)	Taman Desa Jawi	047/19/03	SMK Jawi; SJK (T) Ladang Hawi
Jawi (N19)	Ladang Caledonia	047/19/04	SJK (C) Pai Teik; SJK (T) Nibong Tebal
Jawi (N19)	Ladang Byram	047/19/05	SJK (T) Ldg Byram
Jawi (N19)	Ladang Victoria	047/19/06	SMK Seri Nibong
Jawi (N19)	Taman Sentosa	047/19/07	SK Nibong Tebal
Jawi (N19)	Nibong Tebal	047/19/08	SMK Methodist
Jawi (N19)	Jalan Bukit Panchor	047/19/09	Kolej Vokesional Nibong Tebal
Jawi (N19)	Taman Helang Jaya	047/19/10	SMK Tunku Abdul Rahman
Sungai Bakap (N20)	Padang Lalang	047/20/01	SMK Tasek
Sungai Bakap (N20)	Puteri Gunong	047/20/02	SJK (C) Boon Beng; SK Bandar Tasek Mutiara
Sungai Bakap (N20)	Tasek Junjong	047/20/03	SK Seri Tasek
Sungai Bakap (N20)	Sungai Duri	047/20/04	SK Sungai Duri
Sungai Bakap (N20)	Sungai Bakap	047/20/05	SMK Tun Syed Sheh Barakbah; SK Sungai Bakap
Sungai Bakap (N20)	Ladang Sempah	047/20/06	SK Jawi
Sungai Bakap (N20)	Sungai Kechil	047/20/07	SK Sungai Kechil
Sungai Bakap (N20)	Kampung Besar	047/20/08	SK Sungai Kechil
Sungai Acheh (N21)	Sungai Udang	047/21/01	Madrasah Al-Irsyadiah Sungai Acheh
Sungai Acheh (N21)	Sungai Setar	047/21/02	SK Sungai Setar
Sungai Acheh (N21)	Sungai Acheh	047/21/03	SK Sungai Acheh
Sungai Acheh (N21)	Sungai Bakau	047/21/04	SK Sungai Bakau
Sungai Acheh (N21)	Tanjong Berembang	047/21/05	SMK Sungai Acheh
Sungai Acheh (N21)	Permatang To' Mahat	047/21/06	SK Permatang Tok Mahat; SMA Syeikh Abdullah Fahim
Sungai Acheh (N21)	Taman Transkrian	047/21/07	SMK Saujana Indah

=== Representation history ===
Members of Parliament for Nibong Tebal
Parliament	No	Years	Member	Party	Vote Share
Constituency created, renamed from Seberang Selatan
4th	P039	1974–1978	Goh Cheng Teik (吴清德)	BN (GERAKAN)	11,271; 57.63%
5th	P039	1978–1982	Goh Cheng Teik (吴清德)	BN (GERAKAN)	11,077; 47.86%
6th	P039	1982–1986	Goh Cheng Teik (吴清德)	BN (GERAKAN)	18,256; 68.92%
7th	P043	1986–1990	Goh Cheng Teik (吴清德)	BN (GERAKAN)	15,073; 51.78%
8th	P043	1990–1995	Dominic Joseph Puthucheary (டொமினிக் ஜோசப் புதுச்சேரி)	BN (GERAKAN)	17,233; 52.49%
9th	P046	1995–1999	Goh Cheng Teik (吴清德)	BN (GERAKAN)	22,729; 61.55%
10th	P046	1999–2004	Goh Kheng Huat (吴清发)	BA (DAP)	20,732; 51.13%
11th	P047	2004–2008	Zainal Abidin Osman (زين العابدين عثمان)	BN (UMNO)	18,823; 59.49%
12th	P047	2008–2010	Tan Tee Beng (陈智铭)	PR (PKR)	20,210; 54.13%
12th	P047	2010–2013	Tan Tee Beng (陈智铭)	Independent	20,210; 54.13%
13th	P047	2013–2015	Mansor Othman (منصور عثمان)	PR (PKR)	30,003; 58.03%
13th	P047	2015–2018	Mansor Othman (منصور عثمان)	PH (PKR)	30,003; 58.03%
14th	P047	2018–2020	Mansor Othman (منصور عثمان)	PH (PKR)	35,395; 56.92%
14th	P047	2020–2022	Mansor Othman (منصور عثمان)	PN (BERSATU)	35,395; 56.92%
15th	P047	2022–present	Fadhlina Sidek (فضلنا صديق)	PH (PKR)	42,188; 53.20%

=== State constituency ===
Parliamentary constituency	State constituency						
Parliamentary constituency	1955–1959*	1959–1974	1974–1986	1986–1995	1995–2004	2004–2018	2018–present
Nibong Tebal			Bukit Tambun				
Nibong Tebal				Jawi			
Nibong Tebal			Sungai Acheh				
Nibong Tebal			Sungai Bakap				

=== Historical boundaries ===
State Constiteuncy	Area				
State Constiteuncy	1974	1984	1994	2003	2018
Bukit Tambun	Batu Kawan; Changkat; Pulau Aman; Simpang Ampat; Valdor				
Jawi		Batu Kawan; Nibong Tebal; Sungai Jawi; Valdor		Kampung Bagan Buaya; Kampung Ladang Kerian; Nibong Tebal; Sungai Jawi	
Sungai Acheh	Nibong Tebal; Sungai Acheh; Sungai Bakau; Taman Helang Jaya; Taman Transkrian	Kampung Batas Pinang; Sungai Acheh; Sungai Bakau; Taman Helang Jaya; Taman Transkrian		Kampung Batas Pinang; Sungai Acheh; Sungai Bakau; Sungai Star Kechil; Taman Transkrian	
Sungai Bakap	Jawi; Simpang Ampat; Sungai Duri; Sungai Kechil; Tasek	Kampung Permatang Ara; Simpang Ampat; Sungai Duri; Sungai Kechil; Tasek		Simpang Ampat; Sungai Bakap; Sungai Duri; Sungai Kechil; Tasek	

=== Current state assembly members ===
No.	State Constituency	Member	Coalition (Party)
N19	Jawi	Jason H'ng Mooi Lye	PH (DAP)
N20	Sungai Bakap	Abidin Ismail	PN (PAS)
N21	Sungai Acheh	Rashidi Zinol	BN (UMNO)

=== Local governments & postcodes ===
No.	State Constituency	Local Government	Postcode
N19	Jawi	Seberang Perai City Council	14120 Simpang Ampat; 14200 Sungai Jawi; 14300, 14310, 14320 Nibong Tebal
N20	Sungai Bakap	Seberang Perai City Council	14120 Simpang Ampat; 14200 Sungai Jawi; 14300, 14310, 14320 Nibong Tebal
N21	Sungai Acheh	Seberang Perai City Council	14120 Simpang Ampat; 14200 Sungai Jawi; 14300, 14310, 14320 Nibong Tebal

== Election results ==
Malaysian general election, 2022
Party	Candidate	Votes	%	∆%
PH	Fadhlina Sidek	42,188	53.20	▲53.20
PN	Mansor Othman	25,895	32.65	▲32.65
BN	Thanenthiran Ramankutty	10,660	13.44	▼18.05
Independent	Goh Kheng Huat	565	0.71	▲0.71
Total valid votes		79,308	100.00	
Total rejected ballots		1,021		
Unreturned ballots		148		
Turnout		80,477	80.40	▼5.72
Registered electors		100,062		
Majority		16,293	20.55	▼4.89
PH hold		Swing		
Source(s) https://lom.agc.gov.my/ilims/upload/portal/akta/outputp/1753273/PUB609%20(2022).pdf

Malaysian general election, 2018
Party	Candidate	Votes	%	∆%
PKR	Mansor Othman	35,395	56.92	▼1.11
BN	Shaik Hussein Mydin	19,578	31.49	▼9.91
PAS	Mohd Helmi Harun	6,875	11.06	▲11.06
Independent	Tan Tee Beng	331	0.53	▲0.53
Total valid votes		62,179	100.00	
Total rejected ballots		860		
Unreturned ballots		160		
Turnout		63,199	86.12	▼2.51
Registered electors		73,383		
Majority		15,817	25.44	▲8.51
PKR hold		Swing		+4.40
Source(s) "His Majesty's Government Gazette - Notice of Contested Election, Parliament for the State of Penang [P.U. (B) 236/2018]" (PDF). Attorney General's Chambers of Malaysia. 3 May 2018. "Federal Government Gazette - Results of Contested Election and Statements of the Poll after the Official Addition of Votes, Parliamentary Constituencies for the State of Penang [P.U. (B) 310/2018]" (PDF). Attorney General's Chambers of Malaysia. 28 May 2018.

Malaysian general election, 2013
Party	Candidate	Votes	%	∆%
PKR	Mansor Othman	30,003	58.03	▲3.90
BN	Zainal Abidin Osman	21,405	41.40	▼4.47
Independent	Teng Kok Pheng	297	0.57	▲0.57
Total valid votes		51,705	100.00	
Total rejected ballots		833		
Unreturned ballots		61		
Turnout		52,599	88.63	▲8.43
Registered electors		59,345		
Majority		8,598	16.93	▲8.67
PKR hold		Swing		
Source(s) "Federal Government Gazette - Notice of Contested Election, Parliament for the State of Penang [P.U. (B) 173/2013]" (PDF). Attorney General's Chambers of Malaysia. 26 April 2013. "Federal Government Gazette - Results of Contested Election and Statements of the Poll after the Official Addition of Votes, Parliamentary Constituencies for the State of Penang [P.U. (B) 214/2013]" (PDF). Attorney General's Chambers of Malaysia. 22 May 2013. Archived from the original (PDF) on 22 March 2019.

Malaysian general election, 2008
Party	Candidate	Votes	%	∆%
PKR	Tan Tee Beng	20,210	54.13	▲13.62
BN	Zainal Abidin Osman	17,123	45.87	▼13.62
Total valid votes		37,333	100.00	
Total rejected ballots		784		
Unreturned ballots		12		
Turnout		38,129	80.20	▲1.45
Registered electors		47,540		
Majority		3,087	8.26	▼10.72
PKR gain from BN		Swing		?

Malaysian general election, 2004
Party	Candidate	Votes	%	∆%
BN	Zainal Abidin Osman	18,823	59.49	▲12.94
PKR	Goh Kheng Huat	12,818	40.51	▲40.51
Total valid votes		31,641	100.00	
Total rejected ballots		751		
Unreturned ballots		21		
Turnout		32,413	78.75	▲0.25
Registered electors		41,159		
Majority		6,005	18.98	▲14.40
BN gain from DAP		Swing		?

Malaysian general election, 1999
Party	Candidate	Votes	%	∆%
DAP	Goh Kheng Huat	20,732	51.13	▲12.68
BN	Kang Chin Seng	18,876	46.55	▼15.00
Independent	Abdul Rahman Manap	942	2.32	▲2.32
Total valid votes		40,550	100.00	
Total rejected ballots		1,230		
Unreturned ballots		35		
Turnout		41,815	78.50	▲1.73
Registered electors		53,267		
Majority		1,856	4.58	▼18.52
DAP gain from BN		Swing		?

Malaysian general election, 1995
Party	Candidate	Votes	%	∆%
BN	Goh Cheng Teik	22,729	61.55	▲9.06
DAP	Balasundram Kanagaratham	14,200	38.45	▼9.06
Total valid votes		36,929	100.00	
Total rejected ballots		1,312		
Unreturned ballots		66		
Turnout		38,307	76.77	▼1.87
Registered electors		49,898		
Majority		8,529	23.10	▲18.12
BN hold		Swing		

Malaysian general election, 1990
Party	Candidate	Votes	%	∆%
BN	Dominic Joseph Puthucheary	17,233	52.49	▲0.71
DAP	N. G. Baskaran	15,597	47.51	▲9.31
Total valid votes		32,830	100.00	
Total rejected ballots		1,160		
Unreturned ballots		0		
Turnout		33,990	78.64	▲4.26
Registered electors		43,221		
Majority		1,636	4.98	▼8.60
BN hold		Swing		

Malaysian general election, 1986
Party	Candidate	Votes	%	∆%
BN	Goh Cheng Teik	15,073	51.78	▼17.14
DAP	N. Shanmugam	11,118	38.20	▲7.12
PAS	Kamal Koh @ Koh Ah Toung	2,916	10.02	▲10.02
Total valid votes		29,107	100.00	
Total rejected ballots		806		
Unreturned ballots		0		
Turnout		29,913	74.38	▼3.17
Registered electors		40,216		
Majority		3,955	13.58	▼24.26
BN hold		Swing		

Malaysian general election, 1982
Party	Candidate	Votes	%	∆%
BN	Goh Cheng Teik	18,256	68.92	▲21.06
DAP	Tan Yam Soon	8,231	31.08	▲21.85
Total valid votes		26,487	100.00	
Total rejected ballots		1,427		
Unreturned ballots		0		
Turnout		27,914	77.55	▼2.01
Registered electors		35,995		
Majority		10,025	37.84	▲21.41
BN hold		Swing		

Malaysian general election, 1978
Party	Candidate	Votes	%	∆%
BN	Goh Cheng Teik	11,077	47.86	▼9.77
Independent	Khoo Soo Kheng	7,274	31.43	▲31.43
PAS	Desa Saat	2,230	9.63	▲9.63
DAP	N. Shanmugam	2,137	9.23	▼17.01
Independent	Hanafiah	428	1.85	▲1.85
Total valid votes		23,146	100.00	
Total rejected ballots		1,095		
Unreturned ballots		0		
Turnout		24,241	79.56	▼6.51
Registered electors		30,467		
Majority		3,803	16.43	▼14.96
BN hold		Swing		

Malaysian general election, 1974
Party	Candidate	Votes	%
BN	Goh Cheng Teik	11,271	57.63
DAP	K. Ponnudurai	5,132	26.24
PEKEMAS	Veerappen Veerathan	3,155	16.13
Total valid votes		19,558	100.00
Total rejected ballots		2,623	
Unreturned ballots		0	
Turnout		22,181	86.07
Registered electors		25,771	
Majority		6,139	31.39
This was a new constituency created.
