= R.S. Thanenthiran =

Malaysian politician

Yang Berbahagia Datuk Seri R.S. Thanenthiran SMW PMW

President of the Malaysia Makkal Sakti Party
- Incumbent
- Assumed office 11 May 2009
- Preceded by: Position established

Personal details
- Born: 4 July 1963 (age 63) Sungai Petani, Kedah, Federation of Malaya (now Malaysia)
- Party: Malaysia Makkal Sakti Party (MMSP)
- Spouse: Vaney Maniam (m. 1990)
- Children: 3
- Occupation: Teacher (1985 - 1993); Businessman (1993 - present)
- R.S. Thanenthiran on Facebook

Datuk Seri R.S. Thanenthiran (born 4 July 1963) is a Malaysian politician and businessman. He is the founder and current president of the Malaysia Makkal Sakti Party (MMSP).

== Background ==
Thanenthiran was born on 4 July 1963 at Sungai Petani, Kedah. In 1990, he married Vaney Maniam and they have three children. Before entering politics Thanenthiran worked as a teacher.

== Ideology ==
Thanenthiran and the MMSP's main ideology is to develop the education level of Malaysian Indians. Thanenthiran has called on political leaders to adopt at least one Tamil school.

== Election results ==
Parliament of Malaysia
Year	Constituency	Candidate	Votes	Pct	Opponent(s)	Votes	Pct	Ballots cast	Majority	Turnout
2022	P047 Nibong Tebal	Thanenthiran Ramankutty (MMSP)	10,660	13.44%	Fadhlina Sidek (PKR)	42,188	53.20%	79,308	16,293	79.26%
2022	P047 Nibong Tebal	Thanenthiran Ramankutty (MMSP)	10,660	13.44%	Mansor Othman (BERSATU)	25,895	32.65%	79,308	16,293	79.26%
2022	P047 Nibong Tebal	Thanenthiran Ramankutty (MMSP)	10,660	13.44%	Goh Kheng Huat (IND)	565	0.71%	79,308	16,293	79.26%

== Honours ==
- Federal Territory (Malaysia)
  - Commander of the Order of the Territorial Crown (PMW) – Datuk (2011)
  - Grand Commander of the Order of the Territorial Crown (SMW) – Datuk Seri (2017)
