= Sungai Acheh =

State constituency in Penang, Malaysia

Sungai Acheh (N21)
Penang constituency

State constituency
- Legislature: Penang State Legislative Assembly
MLA
Rashidi Zinol
BN
- Constituency created: 1974
- First contested: 1974
- Last contested: 2023

Demographics
- Electors (2023): 26,095
- Area (km²): 38

Sungai Acheh is a state constituency in Penang, Malaysia, that has been represented in the Penang State Legislative Assembly.

The state constituency was first contested in 1974 and is mandated to return a single Assemblyman to the Penang State Legislative Assembly under the first-past-the-post voting system.

== Definition ==
=== Polling districts ===
According to the federal gazette issued on 30 March 2018, the Sungai Acheh constituency is divided into 7 polling districts.

State constituency	Polling districts	Code	Location
Sungai Acheh (N21)	Sungai Udang	047/21/01	Madrasah Al-Irsyadiah Sungai Acheh
Sungai Acheh (N21)	Sungai Setar	047/21/02	SK Sungai Setar
Sungai Acheh (N21)	Sungai Acheh	047/21/03	SK Sungai Acheh
Sungai Acheh (N21)	Sungai Bakau	047/21/04	SK Sungai Bakau
Sungai Acheh (N21)	Tanjong Berembang	047/21/05	SMK Sungai Acheh
Sungai Acheh (N21)	Permatang To' Mahat	047/21/06	SK Permatang Tok Mahat
Sungai Acheh (N21)	Tamam Transkrian	047/21/07	SMK Saujana Indah

== Demographics ==
Ethnic breakdown of Sungai Acheh's electorate as of 2023
1. Malay (63.8%)
2. Chinese (27.7%)
3. Indian (7.58%)
4. Other ethnicities (0.90%)

Total electors by polling district in 2016
Polling district	Electors
Sungai Udang	2,268
Sungai Setar	1,414
Sungai Acheh	3,039
Sungai Bakau	1,436
Tanjong Berembang	987
Permatang To'Mahat	4,469
Taman Transkrian	2,588
Total	16,201
Source: Malaysian Election Commission

== History ==
Penang State Legislative Assemblyman for Sungai Acheh
Assembly	No	Years	Member	Party
Constituency created from Nibong Tebal and Sungei Bakap
4th	N15	1974 – 1978	Ahmad Salleh	BN (UMNO)
5th	N15	1978 – 1982	Ahmad Salleh	BN (UMNO)
6th	N15	1982 – 1986	Ahmad Salleh	BN (UMNO)
7th	N18	1986 – 1990	Ragayah Ariff	BN (UMNO)
8th	N18	1990 – 1995	Ibrahim Yaakob	BN (UMNO)
9th	N18	1995 – 1999	Abd. Rashid Abdullah	BN (UMNO)
10th	N18	1999 – 2004	Abd. Rashid Abdullah	BN (UMNO)
11th	N21	2004 – 2008	Mohammad Foad Mat Isa	BN (UMNO)
12th	N21	2008 – 2013	Mahmud Zakaria	BN (UMNO)
13th	N21	2013 – 2018	Mahmud Zakaria	BN (UMNO)
14th	N21	2018 – 2020	Zulkifli Ibrahim	PH (PKR)
14th	N21	2020 – 2023	Zulkifli Ibrahim	PN (BERSATU)
14th	N21	2023	Vacant (Note: Vacant from 6 March 2023 until the 2023 state election due to the incumbent was vacated from his seat in an approved motion in the Penang State Assembly along with 3 other BERSATU assemblymen.)	
15th	N21	2023 – present	Rashidi Zinol	BN (UMNO)

== Election results ==
Penang state election, 2023: Sungai Acheh
Party	Candidate	Votes	%	∆%
BN	Rashidi Zinol	9,556	50.33	▲9.24
PN	Zulkifli Ibrahim	9,432	49.67	▲49.67
Total valid votes		19,988	100.00	
Total rejected ballots		150		
Unreturned ballots		29		
Turnout		19,138	73.45	▼12.50
Registered electors		26,095		
Majority		124	0.66	▼1.76
BN gain from PH		Swing		?

Penang state election, 2018: Sungai Acheh
Party	Candidate	Votes	%	∆%
PKR	Zulkifli Ibrahim	7,486	43.51	▲43.51
BN	Mahmud Zakaria	7,070	41.09	▼8.55
PAS	Nor Zamri Latiff	2,383	13.85	▲8.88
Total valid votes		16,939	98.45	
Total rejected ballots		221		
Unreturned ballots		45	1.28	
Turnout		17,205	85.95	▼3.27
Registered electors		20,018		
Majority		416	2.42	▼3.40
PKR gain from BN		Swing		?
Source(s) "His Majesty's Government Gazette - Notice of Contested Election, State Legislative Assembly for the State of Penang [P.U. (B) 252/2018]" (PDF). Attorney General's Chambers of Malaysia. 3 May 2018. "Federal Government Gazette - Results of Contested Election and Statements of the Poll after the Official Addition of Votes, State Constituencies for the State of Penang [P.U. (B) 326/2018]" (PDF). Attorney General's Chambers of Malaysia. 28 May 2018. Archived from the original (PDF) on 2019-08-29.

Penang state election, 2013: Sungai Acheh
Party	Candidate	Votes	%	∆%
BN	Mahmud Zakaria	6,891	49.64	▼0.78
PKR	Badrul Hisham Shaharin	6,083	43.82	▼4.08
PAS	Mohd Yusni Mat Piah	690	4.97	▲4.97
Total valid votes		13,664	98.44	
Total rejected ballots		217	1.56	
Unreturned ballots		3	0.02	
Turnout		13,881	89.22	▲8.72
Registered electors		15,559		
Majority		808	5.82	▲3.30
BN hold		Swing		
Source(s) "Federal Government Gazette - Notice of Contested Election, State Legislative Assembly for the State of Penang [P.U. (B) 189/2013]" (PDF). Attorney General's Chambers of Malaysia. 26 April 2013. "Federal Government Gazette - Results of Contested Election and Statements of the Poll after the Official Addition of Votes, State Constituencies for the State of Penang [P.U. (B) 230/2013]" (PDF). Attorney General's Chambers of Malaysia. 22 May 2013. Archived from the original (PDF) on 2019-03-22.

Penang state election, 2008: Sungai Acheh
Party	Candidate	Votes	%	∆%
BN	Mahmud Zakaria	5,011	50.42	▼16.71
PKR	Azhar Ahamad	4,761	47.90	▲16.80
Total valid votes		9,772	98.32	
Total rejected ballots		162	1.63	
Unreturned ballots		5	0.05	
Turnout		9,939	80.50	▲0.08
Registered electors		12,347		
Majority		250	2.52	▼33.51
BN hold		Swing		
Source(s) "KEPUTUSAN PILIHAN RAYA UMUM DEWAN UNDANGAN NEGERI PERAK BAGI TAHUN 2008".

Penang state election, 2004: Sungai Acheh
Party	Candidate	Votes	%	∆%
BN	Mohd. Foad Mat Isa	5,949	67.13	▲9.80
PAS	Ismail Salleh	2,756	31.10	▼9.41
Total valid votes		8,705	98.23	
Total rejected ballots		146	1.65	
Unreturned ballots		11	0.12	
Turnout		8,862	80.42	▲2.99
Registered electors		11,020		
Majority		3,193	36.03	▲19.21
BN hold		Swing		
Source(s) "KEPUTUSAN PILIHAN RAYA UMUM DEWAN UNDANGAN NEGERI PERAK BAGI TAHUN 2004".

Penang state election, 1999: Sungai Acheh
Party	Candidate	Votes	%	∆%
BN	Abdul Rashid Abdullah	5,979	57.33	▼14.22
PAS	Ismail Supa	4,225	40.51	▲40.51
Total valid votes		10,204	97.84	
Total rejected ballots		221	2.12	
Unreturned ballots		4	0.04	
Turnout		10,429	77.43	▲1.40
Registered electors		13,469		
Majority		1,754	16.82	▼29.03
BN hold		Swing		
Source(s) "KEPUTUSAN PILIHAN RAYA UMUM DEWAN UNDANGAN NEGERI PERAK BAGI TAHUN 1999".

Penang state election, 1995: Sungai Acheh
Party	Candidate	Votes	%	∆%
BN	Abdul Rashid Abdullah	6,787	71.55	▲7.03
DAP	Khairul Annuar Ahmad	2,438	25.70	▲25.70
Total valid votes		9,225	97.25	
Total rejected ballots		247	2.60	
Unreturned ballots		14	0.15	
Turnout		9,486	76.03	▼1.90
Registered electors		12,476		
Majority		4,349	45.85	▲14.06
BN hold		Swing		
Source(s) "KEPUTUSAN PILIHAN RAYA UMUM DEWAN UNDANGAN NEGERI PERAK BAGI TAHUN 1995".

Penang state election, 1990: Sungai Acheh
Party	Candidate	Votes	%	∆%
BN	Ibrahim Yaakob	5,528	64.52	▲11.40
S46	Abu Bakar Yahaya	2,804	32.73	▲32.73
Total valid votes		8,332	97.25	
Total rejected ballots		236	2.75	
Unreturned ballots		0	0.00	
Turnout		8,568	77.93	▲6.86
Registered electors		10,994		
Majority		2,724	31.79	▲11.40
BN hold		Swing		
Source(s) "KEPUTUSAN PILIHAN RAYA UMUM DEWAN UNDANGAN NEGERI PERAK BAGI TAHUN 1990".

Penang state election, 1986: Sungai Acheh
Party	Candidate	Votes	%	∆%
BN	Ragayah Ariff	3,822	53.12	▼3.64
DAP	Mohd Noor Shaari	2,355	32.73	▼1.81
PAS	Abdul Rahman Saik Mahyiddin	860	11.95	▲6.13
Total valid votes		7,037	97.80	
Total rejected ballots		158	2.20	
Unreturned ballots		0	0.00	
Turnout		7,195	71.07	
Registered electors		10,124		
Majority		1,467	20.39	
BN hold		Swing		
Source(s) "KEPUTUSAN PILIHAN RAYA UMUM DEWAN UNDANGAN NEGERI PERAK BAGI TAHUN 1986".

Penang state election, 1982: Sungai Acheh
Party	Candidate	Votes	%	∆%
BN	Ahmad Salleh	5,893	56.76	▼2.18
DAP	Mohd Noor Shaari	3,586	34.54	▲3.46
PAS	Abdul Majid @ Abdul Rahim Abdul Rahman	604	5.82	▼0.18
Independent	Sandaman Yagappan	299	2.88	▲2.88
Total valid votes		10,382	97.48	
Total rejected ballots		266	2.52	
Unreturned ballots		2	0.00	
Turnout		10,650	76.16	
Registered electors		13,983		
Majority		2,305	22.20	
BN hold		Swing		
Source(s) "KEPUTUSAN PILIHAN RAYA UMUM DEWAN UNDANGAN NEGERI PERAK BAGI TAHUN 1982".

Penang state election, 1978: Sungai Acheh
Party	Candidate	Votes	%	∆%
BN	Ahmad Salleh	5,294	58.94	▼2.41
DAP	Mohd Noor Shaari	2,792	31.08	▲31.08
PAS	Ahmad Wahi	507	5.64	▲5.64
Independent	Hanafiah	389	4.33	▲4.33
Total valid votes		8,982	96.88	
Total rejected ballots		289	3.22	
Unreturned ballots		0	0.00	
Turnout		9,271	77.03	
Registered electors		12,036		
Majority		2,502	27.86	
BN hold		Swing		
Source(s) "KEPUTUSAN PILIHAN RAYA UMUM DEWAN UNDANGAN NEGERI PERAK BAGI TAHUN 1978".

Penang state election, 1974: Sungai Acheh
Party	Candidate	Votes	%
BN	Ahmad Salleh	4,619	61.35
PEKEMAS	K. Kumar	2,910	38.65
Total valid votes		7,529	97.07
Total rejected ballots		228	3.03
Unreturned ballots		0	0.00
Turnout		7,757	77.80
Registered electors		9,971	
Majority		1,709	22.70
This was a new constituency created.
Source(s) "KEPUTUSAN PILIHAN RAYA UMUM DEWAN UNDANGAN NEGERI PERAK BAGI TAHUN 1974".

== See also ==
- Constituencies of Penang
