= Sivananthi Thanenthiran =

Malaysian writer and feminist

Sivananthi Thanenthiran is a Malaysian writer and feminist, who is the executive director of ARROW, the Asian-Pacific Resource and Research Centre for Women.

== Life ==
Thanenthiran started her political work by promoting female candidates in political elections. In her professional life, she worked for the United Nations, taught at the university, and ran a magazine. She also co-wrote and edited books on Agenda 21, such as Cities, Chaos & Creativity: A Sourcebook for Communicators, Cities, Citizens & Civilisations: Frequently Asked Questions on Good Urban Governance and Agenda for Action: Action for Better Cities. While making research for a book on sexual and reproductive health and rights, she discovered the lack of knowledge on the topic in Malaysia, and joined the Malaysia-based NGO ARROW, the Asian-Pacific Resource and Research Centre for Women, for which she eventually became the Executive Director. In this regard, she gave a statement to the United Nations General Assembly in March 2015.

The research center works in the form of a regional partnership between 15 countries in Asia-Pacific, and with organizations and networks in these countries and across the global south. Its focus is on women and young people, with a specific focus on sexual and reproductive health and rights.
