= Malaysia Makkal Sakti Party =

Malaysia political party

- Malay name: Parti Makkal Sakti Malaysia ڤرتي مقكل سقتي مليسيا
- Chinese name: 馬來西亞人民力量黨 马来西亚人民力量党; Mǎláixīyà rénmín lìliáng dǎng
- Tamil name: மலேசியா மக்கள் சக்தி கட்சி Malēciyā makkaḷ cakti kaṭci
- Abbreviation: MMSP
- President: R.S. Thanenthiran
- Founder: R.S. Thanenthiran
- Founded: 11 May 2009
- Split from: Hindu Rights Action Force (HINDRAF)
- Headquarters: Shah Alam, Selangor
- Ideology: Dravidian politics
- Political position: Right-wing
- National affiliation: Friends of BN (since 2010)
- Colours: Yellow, orange, red, brown
- Dewan Negara: 0 / 70
- Dewan Rakyat: 0 / 222
- Dewan Undangan Negeri: 0 / 607

Website
- www.makkalsakti.org

The Malaysia Makkal Sakti Party (Malay: Parti Makkal Sakti Malaysia; Tamil: மலேசியா மக்கள் சக்தி கட்சி, romanized: Malēciyā Makkaḷ Cakti Kaṭci; abbrev: MMSP) is a political party in Malaysia that seeks to champion ethnic Malaysian-Indian issues. MMSP is an offshoot but unaffiliated of the apolitical NGO of Hindu Rights Action Force (HINDRAF) formed by its former coordinator R.S. Thanenthiran and his detractors faction aligned to the ruling Barisan Nasional (BN)'s United Malays National Organisation (UMNO) government then whoes actrocities the movement had been fighting against. It had even copied the NGO's slogan of People's Power (மக்கள் சக்தி / Makkal Sakti) as the party name.

The MMSP which was officially launched by the new prime minister Najib Abdul Razak then on 10 October 2009, has been allegedly sponsored by Barisan Nasional (BN) although the party had denied at the beginning, MMSP maintains friendly relations with BN though it is not an official party member of the BN coalition and even supported it openly in the 2018 general election (GE14). MMSP seeks to be admitted to the coalition and had stated it will not seek for election seats. Somehow the party decided other wise and has instead demanded to contest under BN in three parliamentary and seven state seats in Next Malaysian general election (GE15), after being considered a 'Friends of BN' party. In September 2021, BN chairman Ahmad Zahid Hamidi has announced that MMSP will be given seats to contest by the coalition in GE15. On 30 January 2022, after UMNO secretary-general Ahmad Maslan's meeting with MMSP which had pledged its supports for BN, also had given a positive indication on the party be given a seat to contest in the 2022 Johor state election.

== General election results ==
Election	Total seats won	Seats contested	Total votes	Voting Percentage	Outcome of election	Election leader
2022	0 / 222	1	10,660	0.07	No representation in Parliament (Friends of BN)	R.S. Thanentiran

=== State assemblies ===
State assembly	Election	Votes	%	Seats	Won/contested	+/–	Position (Note: As part of electoral coalition.)	Status
Perlis	2022	Did not contest						No seats
Kedah	2023	Did not contest						No seats
Kelantan	2023	Did not contest						No seats
Terengganu	2023	Did not contest						No seats
Penang	2023	Did not contest						No seats
Perak	2022	1,443	0.1	0 / 59	0 / 1	Steady	3rd (Barisan Nasional)	No seats
Pahang	2022	Did not contest						No seats
Selangor	2023	Did not contest						No seats
Negeri Sembilan	2026	Did not contest						No seats
Malacca	2026	Did not contest						No seats
Johor	2026	Did not contest						No seats
Sabah	2025	Did not contest						No seats

Note

State election	State Legislative Assembly	
State election	Penang	Total won / Total contested
2/3 majority	2 / 3	
2022	0 / 59	0 / 1

== See also ==
- HINDRAF
- Barisan Nasional
- Politics of Malaysia
- List of political parties in Malaysia
