= Sungai Bakap (state constituency) =

State constituency in Penang, Malaysia

Sungai Bakap (N20)
Penang constituency

State constituency
- Legislature: Penang State Legislative Assembly
MLA
Abidin Ismail
PN
- Constituency created: 1959
- First contested: 1959 (as Sungei Bakap)
- Last contested: 2024

Demographics
- Population (2020): 56,802
- Electors (2024): 39,279
- Area (km²): 84

Sungai Bakap is a state constituency in Penang, Malaysia, that has been represented in the Penang State Legislative Assembly.

The state constituency was first contested in 1974 and is mandated to return a single Assemblyman to the Penang State Legislative Assembly under the first-past-the-post voting system. The seat has been represented by Abidin Ismail of Perikatan Nasional (PN) since 2024.

== Definition ==
=== Polling districts ===
According to the federal gazette issued on 18 July 2023, the Sungai Bakap constituency is divided into 8 polling districts.

| State constituency | Polling districts | Code | Location |
|---|---|---|---|
| Sungai Bakap (N20) | Padang Lalang | 047/20/01 | SMK Tasek |
| Sungai Bakap (N20) | Puteri Gunong | 047/20/02 | SJK (C) Boon Beng; SK Bandar Tasek Mutiara |
| Sungai Bakap (N20) | Tasek Junjong | 047/20/03 | SK Seri Tasek |
| Sungai Bakap (N20) | Sungai Duri | 047/20/04 | SK Sungai Duri |
| Sungai Bakap (N20) | Sungai Bakap | 047/20/05 | SMK Tun Syed Sheh Barakbah; SK Sungai Bakap |
| Sungai Bakap (N20) | Ladang Sempah | 047/20/06 | SK Jawi |
| Sungai Bakap (N20) | Sungai Kechil | 047/20/07 | SK Sungai Kechil |
| Sungai Bakap (N20) | Kampung Besar | 047/20/08 | SK Sungai Kechil |

== Demographics ==
Ethnic breakdown of Sungai Bakap's electorate as of 2023
1. Malay (59.4%)
2. Chinese (22.5%)
3. Indian (17.4%)
4. Other ethnicities (0.71%)

Total electors by polling district in 2016
| Polling district | Electors |
|---|---|
| Padang Lalang | 2,465 |
| Puteri Gunong | 5,804 |
| Tasek Junjong | 1,637 |
| Sungai Duri | 2,498 |
| Sungai Bakap | 4,694 |
| Ladang Sempah | 498 |
| Sungai Kechil | 1,484 |
| Kampung Besar | 1,059 |
| Total | 20,139 |
Source: Malaysian Election Commission

== History ==
Penang State Legislative Assemblyman for Sungai Bakap
| Assembly | No | Years | Member | Party |
Constituency created
Sungei Bakap
| 1st | N06 | 1959–1964 | Kee Yong Chin (纪永进) | Alliance (MCA) |
| 2nd | N06 | 1964–1969 | Kee Yong Chin (纪永进) | Alliance (MCA) |
| | | 1969–1971 | Assembly was dissolved | |
| 3rd | N06 | 1971 - 1973 | Veerappen Veerathan | GERAKAN |
| 3rd | N06 | 1973 - 1974 | Veerappen Veerathan | BN (GERAKAN) |
Sungai Bakap
| 4th | N14 | 1974–1978 | S. P. Chelliah | BN (GERAKAN) |
| 5th | N14 | 1978–1982 | Teoh Kooi Sneah (张桂城) | BN (GERAKAN) |
| 6th | N14 | 1982–1986 | Teoh Kooi Sneah (张桂城) | BN (GERAKAN) |
| 7th | N16 | 1986–1990 | Lim Boon Sho (林文初) | BN (GERAKAN) |
| 8th | N16 | 1990–1995 | Goh Cheng Teik (吴清德) | BN (GERAKAN) |
| 9th | N16 | 1995–1997 | Ooi Theng Bok (黄腾睦) | BN (GERAKAN) |
| 9th | N16 | 1997–1999 | Lai Chew Hock (赖秋福) | BN (GERAKAN) |
| 10th | N16 | 1999–2004 | Lai Chew Hock (赖秋福) | BN (GERAKAN) |
| 11th | N20 | 2004–2008 | Abd. Rashid Abdullah | BN (UMNO) |
| 12th | N20 | 2008–2013 | Maktar Shapee | PR (PKR) |
| 13th | N20 | 2013–2015 | Maktar Shapee | PR (PKR) |
| 13th | N20 | 2015–2018 | Maktar Shapee | PH (PKR) |
| 14th | N20 | 2018–2023 | Amar Pritpal Abdullah | PH (PKR) |
| 15th | N20 | 2023–2024 | Nor Zamri Latiff | PN (PAS) |
| 15th | N20 | 2024–present | Abidin Ismail | PN (PAS) |

== Election results ==
The electoral results for the Sungai Bakap state constituency are as follows.

Penang state by-election, 6 July 2024 Upon the death of incumbent, Nor Zamri Latiff
| Party | Candidate | Votes | % | ∆% |
|---|---|---|---|---|
| PN | Abidin Ismail | 14,489 | 58.63 | ▲5.94 |
| PH | Joohari Ariffin | 10,222 | 41.37 | ▼5.94 |
| Total valid votes | | 24,711 | 100.00 | |
| Total rejected ballots | | 208 | | |
| Unreturned ballots | | 4 | | |
| Turnout | | 24,923 | 63.45 | ▼13.03 |
| Registered electors | | 39,279 | | |
| Majority | | 4,267 | 17.26 | ▲11.18 |
| PN hold | | Swing | | |

Penang state election, 2023
| Party | Candidate | Votes | % | ∆% |
|---|---|---|---|---|
| PN | Nor Zamri Latiff | 15,433 | 52.69 | ▲52.69 |
| PKR | Nurhidayah Che Rus | 13,870 | 47.31 | ▲1.71 |
| Total valid votes | | 29,303 | 100.00 | |
| Total rejected ballots | | 201 | | |
| Unreturned ballots | | 26 | | |
| Turnout | | 29,530 | 76.88 | ▼10.22 |
| Registered electors | | 38,409 | | |
| Majority | | 1,563 | 5.38 | ▼4.92 |
| PN gain from PH | | Swing | | ? |

Penang state election, 2018
| Party | Candidate | Votes | % | ∆% |
|---|---|---|---|---|
| PKR | Amar Pritpal Abdullah | 10,386 | 45.60 | ▼9.80 |
| BN | Mohamed Sani Bakar | 8,038 | 35.30 | ▼9.30 |
| PAS | Osman Jaafar | 4,316 | 18.90 | ▲18.90 |
| Parti Rakyat Malaysia | Tan Chow Kang | 55 | 0.20 | ▲0.20 |
| Total valid votes | | 22,795 | 100.00 | |
| Total rejected ballots | | 353 | | |
| Unreturned ballots | | 69 | | |
| Turnout | | 23,217 | 87.10 | ▼2.00 |
| Registered electors | | 26,666 | | |
| Majority | | 2,348 | 10.30 | ▼0.50 |
| PKR hold | | Swing | | |
Source(s) "His Majesty's Government Gazette - Notice of Contested Election, State Legislative Assembly for the State of Penang [P.U. (B) 252/2018]" (PDF). Attorney General's Chambers of Malaysia. 3 May 2018. "Federal Government Gazette - Results of Contested Election and Statements of the Poll after the Official Addition of Votes, State Constituencies for the State of Penang [P.U. (B) 326/2018]" (PDF). Attorney General's Chambers of Malaysia. 28 May 2018.

Penang state election, 2013
| Party | Candidate | Votes | % | ∆% |
|---|---|---|---|---|
| PKR | Maktar Shapee | 9,258 | 55.40 | ▼3.30 |
| BN | Mohammad Foad Haji Mat Isa | 7,453 | 44.60 | ▲3.30 |
| Total valid votes | | 16,711 | 100.00 | |
| Total rejected ballots | | 256 | | |
| Unreturned ballots | | 0 | | |
| Turnout | | 16,967 | 89.10 | ▲8.70 |
| Registered electors | | 19,051 | | |
| Majority | | 1,805 | 10.80 | ▼6.60 |
| PKR hold | | Swing | | |
Source(s) "Federal Government Gazette - Notice of Contested Election, State Legislative Assembly for the State of Penang [P.U. (B) 189/2013]" (PDF). Attorney General's Chambers of Malaysia. 26 April 2013. "Federal Government Gazette - Results of Contested Election and Statements of the Poll after the Official Addition of Votes, State Constituencies for the State of Penang [P.U. (B) 230/2013]" (PDF). Attorney General's Chambers of Malaysia. 22 May 2013.

Penang state election, 2008
| Party | Candidate | Votes | % | ∆% |
|---|---|---|---|---|
| PKR | Maktar Shapee | 6,976 | 58.70 | ▲19.33 |
| BN | Abdul Rashid Abdullah | 4,909 | 41.30 | ▼19.33 |
| Total valid votes | | 11,885 | 100.00 | |
| Total rejected ballots | | 200 | | |
| Unreturned ballots | | 2 | | |
| Turnout | | 12,087 | 80.40 | ▲2.09 |
| Registered electors | | 15,026 | | |
| Majority | | 2,067 | 17.40 | ▼3.86 |
| PKR gain from BN | | Swing | | ? |

Penang state election, 2004
| Party | Candidate | Votes | % | ∆% |
|---|---|---|---|---|
| BN | Abdul Rashid Abdullah | 5,693 | 60.63 | ▲0.72 |
| PKR | Maktar Shapee | 3,697 | 39.37 | ▼0.72 |
| Total valid votes | | 9,390 | 100.00 | |
| Total rejected ballots | | 207 | | |
| Unreturned ballots | | 5 | | |
| Turnout | | 9,602 | 78.31 | ▼0.33 |
| Registered electors | | 12,261 | | |
| Majority | | 2,067 | 21.26 | ▲1.44 |
| BN hold | | Swing | | |

Penang state election, 1999
| Party | Candidate | Votes | % | ∆% |
|---|---|---|---|---|
| BN | Lai Chew Hock | 8,315 | 59.91 | ▲11.57 |
| PKR | Maktar Shapee | 5,564 | 40.09 | ▲40.09 |
| Total valid votes | | 13,879 | 100.00 | |
| Total rejected ballots | | 329 | | |
| Unreturned ballots | | 14 | | |
| Turnout | | 14,222 | 78.64 | ▲14.77 |
| Registered electors | | 18,086 | | |
| Majority | | 2,751 | 19.82 | ▲5.93 |
| BN hold | | Swing | | |

Penang state by-election, 8 November 1997 Upon the death of incumbent, Ooi Theng Bok
| Party | Candidate | Votes | % | ∆% |
|---|---|---|---|---|
| BN | Lai Chew Hock | 5,010 | 48.34 | ▼24.01 |
| DAP | Goh Kheng Huat | 3,570 | 34.45 | ▲6.80 |
| Independent | Abu Harith Ahmad | 1,758 | 16.96 | ▲16.96 |
| Independent | K. Ganesh | 26 | 0.25 | ▲0.25 |
| Total valid votes | | 10,364 | 100.00 | |
| Total rejected ballots | | 230 | | |
| Unreturned ballots | | 0 | | |
| Turnout | | 10,594 | 63.87 | ▼10.66 |
| Registered electors | | 16,589 | | |
| Majority | | 1,440 | 13.89 | ▼30.81 |
| BN hold | | Swing | | |

Penang state election, 1995
| Party | Candidate | Votes | % | ∆% |
|---|---|---|---|---|
| BN | Ooi Theng Bok | 8,621 | 72.35 | ▲7.97 |
| DAP | Abdul Razal Abdul Hamid | 3,294 | 27.65 | ▲27.65 |
| Total valid votes | | 11,915 | 100.00 | |
| Total rejected ballots | | 395 | | |
| Unreturned ballots | | 40 | | |
| Turnout | | 12,350 | 74.53 | ▼3.24 |
| Registered electors | | 16,570 | | |
| Majority | | 5,327 | 44.70 | ▲15.94 |
| BN hold | | Swing | | |

Penang state election, 1990
| Party | Candidate | Votes | % | ∆% |
|---|---|---|---|---|
| BN | Goh Cheng Teik | 6,564 | 64.38 | ▲18.43 |
| S46 | Abu Harith Ahmad | 3,632 | 35.62 | ▲35.62 |
| Total valid votes | | 10,196 | 100.00 | |
| Total rejected ballots | | 357 | | |
| Unreturned ballots | | 9 | | |
| Turnout | | 10,562 | 77.77 | ▲3.81 |
| Registered electors | | 13,581 | | |
| Majority | | 2,935 | 28.76 | ▲21.24 |
| BN hold | | Swing | | |

Penang state election, 1986
| Party | Candidate | Votes | % | ∆% |
|---|---|---|---|---|
| BN | Lim Boon Sho | 4,157 | 45.95 | ▼15.18 |
| Independent | Teoh Kooi Sneah | 3,477 | 38.43 | ▲38.43 |
| PAS | Mangshor Md. Rejab | 1,413 | 15.62 | ▼6.31 |
| Total valid votes | | 9,047 | 100.00 | |
| Total rejected ballots | | 342 | | |
| Unreturned ballots | | 0 | | |
| Turnout | | 9,389 | 73.96 | ▼3.36 |
| Registered electors | | 12,695 | | |
| Majority | | 680 | 7.52 | ▼31.68 |
| BN hold | | Swing | | |

Penang state election, 1982
| Party | Candidate | Votes | % | ∆% |
|---|---|---|---|---|
| BN | Teoh Kooi Sneah | 5,499 | 61.13 | ▲26.45 |
| PAS | Ab. Hamid Darus | 1,973 | 21.93 | ▲15.04 |
| DAP | Lee Hee Seng | 1,524 | 16.94 | ▲12.16 |
| Total valid votes | | 8,996 | 100.00 | |
| Total rejected ballots | | 315 | | |
| Unreturned ballots | | 0 | | |
| Turnout | | 9,311 | 77.32 | ▼1.84 |
| Registered electors | | 12,042 | | |
| Majority | | 3,526 | 39.20 | ▲34.92 |
| BN hold | | Swing | | |

Penang state election, 1978
| Party | Candidate | Votes | % | ∆% |
|---|---|---|---|---|
| BN | Teoh Kooi Sneah | 2,583 | 34.68 | ▼18.09 |
| Independent | Khoo Soo Kheng | 2,264 | 30.40 | ▲30.40 |
| Independent | Yusoff Sulaiman | 1,633 | 21.93 | ▲21.93 |
| PAS | Shaik Adam | 513 | 6.89 | ▲6.89 |
| DAP | Teow Sang Seng | 356 | 4.78 | ▼18.17 |
| SDP | Khor Ewe Tien | 99 | 1.33 | ▲1.33 |
| Total valid votes | | 7,448 | 100.00 | |
| Total rejected ballots | | 452 | | |
| Unreturned ballots | | 0 | | |
| Turnout | | 7,900 | 79.16 | ▼1.84 |
| Registered electors | | 9,980 | | |
| Majority | | 319 | 4.28 | ▼25.54 |
| BN hold | | Swing | | |

Penang state election, 1974
| Party | Candidate | Votes | % | ∆% |
|---|---|---|---|---|
| BN | S.P. Chelliah | 3,350 | 52.77 | ▲23.50 |
| DAP | Khaw Teik Hock | 1,457 | 22.95 | ▲22.95 |
| Parti Rakyat Malaysia | Tan Cheng Teng | 846 | 13.33 | ▲13.33 |
| PEKEMAS | Noor Shaari | 695 | 10.95 | ▲10.95 |
| Total valid votes | | 6,348 | 100.00 | |
| Total rejected ballots | | 393 | | |
| Unreturned ballots | | 0 | | |
| Turnout | | 6,741 | 81.00 | ▲0.40 |
| Registered electors | | 8,344 | | |
| Majority | | 1,893 | 29.82 | ▲7.23 |
| BN gain from GERAKAN | | Swing | | ? |

Penang state election, 1969
| Party | Candidate | Votes | % | ∆% |
|---|---|---|---|---|
| GERAKAN | V. Veerappen | 5,519 | 51.86 | ▲51.86 |
| Alliance | Kee Yong Chin | 3,115 | 29.27 | ▼34.39 |
| Independent | Md. Noor Mahmood | 2,008 | 18.87 | ▲18.87 |
| Total valid votes | | 10,642 | 100.00 | |
| Total rejected ballots | | 633 | | |
| Unreturned ballots | | 80 | | |
| Turnout | | 11,355 | 80.60 | ▼5.00 |
| Registered electors | | 14,085 | | |
| Majority | | 2,484 | 22.59 | ▼4.93 |
| GERAKAN gain from Alliance | | Swing | | ? |

Penang state election, 1964
| Party | Candidate | Votes | % | ∆% |
|---|---|---|---|---|
| Alliance | Kee Yong Chin | 6,303 | 63.76 | ▲16.66 |
| Socialist Front | Shahadat Hussain | 3,583 | 36.24 | ▲1.44 |
| Total valid votes | | 9,886 | 100.00 | |
| Total rejected ballots | | 403 | | |
| Unreturned ballots | | 0 | | |
| Turnout | | 10,289 | 85.60 | ▲8.30 |
| Registered electors | | 12,017 | | |
| Majority | | 2,720 | 27.52 | ▲15.22 |
| Alliance hold | | Swing | | |

Penang state election, 1959
| Party | Candidate | Votes | % |
|---|---|---|---|
| Alliance | Kee Yong Chin | 3,266 | 47.10 |
| Socialist Front | V. Veerappen | 2,413 | 34.80 |
| Independent | Md. Noor Mahmood | 1,255 | 18.10 |
| Total valid votes | | 6,934 | 100.00 |
| Total rejected ballots | | 95 | |
| Unreturned ballots | | 0 | |
| Turnout | | 7,029 | 77.30 |
| Registered electors | | 9,901 | |
| Majority | | 2,720 | 12.30 |
This was a new constituency created.

== See also ==
- Constituencies of Penang
