= Rashidi Zinol =

Malaysian politician

Yang Berhormat Dato' Rashidi Zinol DSPN MLA
- رشيدي زينول

Member of Penang State Executive Council
- Incumbent
- Assumed office 16 August 2023
- Governor: Ahmad Fuzi Abdul Razak (2023–2025); Ramli Ngah Talib (since 2025)
- Chief Minister: Chow Kon Yeow
- Portfolio: Rural Development, Trade & Entrepreneurship Development
- Preceded by: Norlela Ariffin (Rural Development); Abdul Halim Hussain (Trade & Entrepreneurship Development)
- Constituency: Sungai Acheh

Member of the Penang State Legislative Assembly for Sungai Acheh
- Incumbent
- Assumed office 12 August 2023
- Preceded by: Zulkifli Ibrahim (PH–PKR)
- Majority: 124 (2023)

Personal details
- Born: Rashidi bin Zinol
- Citizenship: Malaysian
- Party: United Malays National Organisation (UMNO)
- Other political affiliations: Barisan Nasional (BN)
- Occupation: Politician

Rashidi bin Zinol is a Malaysian politician who has served as Member of the Penang State Executive Council (EXCO) in the Pakatan Harapan (PH) state administration under Chief Minister Chow Kon Yeow and Member of the Penang State Legislative Assembly (MLA) for Sungai Acheh since August 2023. He is a member of the United Malays National Organisation (UMNO), a component party of the Barisan Nasional (BN) coalition. He is also the only BN and UMNO Penang EXCO Member, the first one since 2008 as well as one of the only two BN and UMNO Penang MLAs alongside Bertam MLA Reezal Merican Naina Merican.

== Political career ==
Rashidi was appointed a member of Penang State Executive Council, holding the portfolio of Rural Development, Trade and Entrepreneurial Development after the 2023 Penang state election.

== Election results ==
Penang State Legislative Assembly
Year	Constituency	Candidate	Votes	Pct.	Opponent(s)	Votes	Pct.	Ballots cast	Majority	Turnout
2023	N21 Sungai Acheh	Rashidi Zinol (UMNO)	9,556	50.33%	Zulkifli Ibrahim (BERSATU)	9,432	49.67%	19,138	124	73.45%

== Honours ==
- Penang
  - Officer of the Order of the Defender of State (DSPN) – Dato' (2024)
