= Afif Bahardin =

Malaysian politician

Yang Berhormat Afif Bahardin MLA
- عفيف بحرالدين

Member of the Penang State Executive Council
- In office 9 May 2013 – 4 March 2020
- Governor: Abdul Rahman Abbas
- Chief Minister: Lim Guan Eng (2013–2018); Chow Kon Yeow (2018–2020)
- Portfolio: Agriculture, Agro-based Industries, Rural Development and Health
- Preceded by: Law Choo Kiang (Agriculture, Agro-based Industries & Rural Development); Phee Boon Poh (Health)
- Succeeded by: Norlela Ariffin
- Constituency: Seberang Jaya

Member of the Supreme Council of the Malaysian United Indigenous Party
- Incumbent
- Assumed office 28 January 2024
- President: Muhyiddin Yassin

Vice Youth Chief of the People's Justice Party
- In office 22 August 2014 – 16 November 2018
- President: Wan Azizah Wan Ismail
- Youth Chief: Nik Nazmi Nik Ahmad
- Preceded by: Khairul Anuar Ahmad Zainuddin
- Succeeded by: Muhammad Hilman Idham

Member of the Selangor State Legislative Assembly for Taman Medan
- Incumbent
- Assumed office 12 August 2023
- Preceded by: Syamsul Firdaus Mohamed Supri (PH–PKR)
- Majority: 30 (2023)

Member of the Penang State Legislative Assembly for Seberang Jaya
- In office 5 May 2013 – 6 March 2023
- Preceded by: Arif Shah Omar Shah (BN–UMNO)
- Succeeded by: Izhar Shah Arif Shah (PN–BERSATU)
- Majority: 2,459 (2013); 7,421 (2018)

Faction represented in the Selangor State Legislative Assembly
- 2023–: Perikatan Nasional

Faction represented in the Penang State Legislative Assembly
- 2013–2018: People's Justice Party
- 2018–2020: Pakatan Harapan
- 2020: Malaysian United Indigenous Party
- 2020–2023: Perikatan Nasional

Personal details
- Born: Afif bin Bahardin; 13 May 1985 (age 41) Shah Alam, Selangor, Malaysia
- Citizenship: Malaysia
- Party: People's Justice Party (PKR) (until 2020); Malaysian United Indigenous Party (BERSATU) (since 2020)
- Other political affiliations: Pakatan Rakyat (PR) (until 2015); Pakatan Harapan (PH) (2015–2020); Perikatan Nasional (PN) (since 2020)
- Spouse: Mardhiah Zakaria (m. 2010)
- Children: Aaina Sofea Afif; Ar-Rayyan Afif
- Education: Universiti Teknologi Mara (MBBS)
- Occupation: Politician
- Profession: Physician
- Website: afifbahardin.com

Afif bin Bahardin (born 13 May 1985) is a Malaysian politician and physician who has served as Member of the Selangor State Legislative Assembly (MLA) for Taman Medan since August 2023. He previously served as Member of the Penang State Executive Council (EXCO) in the Pakatan Rakyat (PR) and Pakatan Harapan (PH) state administrations under Chief Ministers Lim Guan Eng and Chow Kon Yeow from May 2013 to his resignation in March 2020 as well as Member of the Penang State Legislative Assembly (MLA) for Seberang Jaya from May 2013 to March 2023.

He is a member of the Malaysian United Indigenous Party (BERSATU), a component party of the Perikatan Nasional (PN) coalition and was a member of the People's Justice Party (PKR), a component party of the PH coalition. He has also served as a Member of the Supreme Council of BERSATU since January 2024 and is the State Secretary of PN of Selangor. He also served as the Vice Youth Chief of PKR from August 2014 to November 2018 and Deputy Division Chief of PKR of Permatang Pauh.

== Personal background ==
He grew up in Shah Alam, Selangor. He received his secondary education at Maktab Rendah Sains MARA Lenggong/Chenderoh in Perak and had his university education at Universiti Teknologi MARA (UiTM), graduated with a bachelor's degree in medicine and surgery.

After leaving university, Afif worked as a medical officer at the Seberang Jaya Hospital and Sungai Buloh Hospital. In October 2010, Afif married Mardhiah Zakaria. The couple have two children.

== Political career ==
=== Member of the Penang State Executive Council (2013–2020) ===
On 9 May 2013, Afif was appointed Penang EXCO Member in charge of Agriculture, Agro-based industries, Rural Development and Health, replacing Law Choo Kiang who had been appointed the new Speaker of the Assembly.

=== Member of the Penang State Legislative Assembly (2013–2023) ===
==== 2013 Penang state election ====
In 2013 Penang state election, Afif made his electoral debut after being nominated by PR to contest the Seberang Jaya state seat. Afif won the seat and was elected to the Penang State Legislative Assembly after defeating Mohammad Nasir Abdullah of the Barisan Nasional (BN) coalition and independent candidate Shamsut Tabrej GM Ismail Maricar by a majority of 2,459 votes.

==== 2018 Penang state election ====
In the 2018 Penang state election, Afif was renominated by PH to defend the Seberang Jaya seat. Afif defended the seat and was reelected to the Penang Assembly after defeating Abu Bakar Sidekh Zainul Abidin of BN and Ahmad Rafaei Rashid of Gagasan Sejahtera (GS) by a majority of 7,421 votes.

==== 2023 disqualification ====
In March 2023, the Seberang Jaya seat held by Afif was declared vacant after he violated the state anti-party hopping law of Penang by Speaker Law.

=== Member of the People's Justice Party ===
In the PKR party elections in 2014, Afif was elected as the Deputy Youth Chief. He took over the position from Khairul Anuar Ahmad Zainuddin.

During the 2018 PKR party elections, Afif contested the PKR Youth Chief position but was defeated by Deputy Presidential candidate Rafizi Ramli loyalist Akmal Nasrullah Mohd Nasir.

On 24 June 2020, he left PKR for BERSATU.

=== Member of the Selangor State Legislative Assembly (since 2023) ===
==== 2023 Selangor state election ====
In the 2023 Selangor state election, Afif was renominated by PN to contest the Taman Medan state seat. Afif won and was elected to the Selangor State Legislative Assembly as Taman Medan MLA for the first term after narrowly defeating Ahmad Akhir Pawan Chik of PH by an extremely small majority of only 30 votes.

=== Member of the Malaysian United Indigenous Party ===
On 24 June 2020, he joined BERSATU.

On 28 January 2024, Afif was appointed Member of the Supreme Council of BERSATU by party president Muhyiddin Yassin alongside Member of Parliament (MP) for Padang Serai Azman Nasrudin and former Perak EXCO Member and former Tualang Sekah MLA Nolee Ashilin Mohammed Radzi.

== Election results ==
Penang State Legislative Assembly
Year	Constituency	Candidate	Votes	Pct	Opponent(s)	Votes	Pct	Ballots cast	Majority	Turnout
2013	N10 Seberang Jaya	Afif Bahardin (PKR)	14,148	54.23%	Mohammad Nasir Abdullah (UMNO)	11,689	44.81%	26,362	2,459	88.20%
2013	N10 Seberang Jaya	Afif Bahardin (PKR)	14,148	54.23%	Shamsut Tabrej GM Ismail Maricar (IND)	251	0.96%	26,362	2,459	88.20%
2018	N10 Seberang Jaya	Afif Bahardin (PKR)	16,014	53.12%	Abu Bakar Sidekh Zainul Abidin (UMNO)	8,593	28.50%	30,496	7,421	85.8%
2018	N10 Seberang Jaya	Afif Bahardin (PKR)	16,014	53.12%	Ahmad Rafaei Rashid (PAS)	5,540	18.38%	30,496	7,421	85.8%

Parliament of Malaysia
Year	Constituency	Candidate	Votes	Pct	Opponent(s)	Votes	Pct	Ballots cast	Majority	Turnout
2022	P108 Shah Alam	Afif Bahardin (BERSATU)	43,314	31.90%	Azli Yusof (AMANAH)	61,409	45.93%	137,082	18,095	81.92%
2022	P108 Shah Alam	Afif Bahardin (BERSATU)	43,314	31.90%	Isham Jalil (UMNO)	28,266	20.82%	137,082	18,095	81.92%
2022	P108 Shah Alam	Afif Bahardin (BERSATU)	43,314	31.90%	Muhammad Rafique Rashid Ali (PEJUANG)	2,781	2.05%	137,082	18,095	81.92%

Selangor State Legislative Assembly
Year	Constituency	Candidate	Votes	Pct	Opponent(s)	Votes	Pct	Ballots cast	Majority	Turnout
2023	N33 Taman Medan	Afif Bahardin (BERSATU)	22,316	50.03%	Ahmad Akhir Pawan Chik (PKR)	22,286	49.97%	44,602	30	71.99%
