= Permatang Pauh (disambiguation) =

Permatang Pauh may refer to:

- Permatang Pauh
- Permatang Pauh (federal constituency), represented in the Dewan Rakyat
- Permatang Pauh (state constituency), formerly represented in the Penang State Legislative Assembly (1959–74), see List of Malaysian State Assembly Representatives (1969–1974)
