= Pirdaus Ismail =

Malaysian politician

Yang Berbahagia Dato' Pirdaus Ismail DSPN

Personal details
- Born: 11 September 1965 (age 61) Penang, Malaysia
- Citizenship: Malaysian
- Party: BN (UMNO)
- Education: Al-Azhar University; Kolej Professional Mara Indera Mahkota

Pirdaus Ismail (11 September 1965) is a Malaysian politician. He was the Imam of the National Mosque of Malaysia and Special Officer former Minister of Home Affairs Hishammuddin Hussein.

== Background ==
Pirdaus received his Diploma in Islamic studies from the Institute of Tahfiz Al-Quran Wal Qiraat, Pusat Islam Malaysia (now Darul Quran) in 1988. Subsequently, he studied at Al-Azhar University, Cairo, Egypt and graduated with a Bachelor degree with Honours in Islamic studies in 1994.

== Career ==
He began his career in the Islamic Services as a lecturer in Islamic Studies at Darul Quran, Jabatan Kemajuan Islam Malaysia (JAKIM) for a period of one year from 1994 to 1995. Thereafter, from 1995 onward, he went on to serve as the officer at JAKIM. Until 2004, he was the Imam in the National Mosque, Kuala Lumpur. In 2005, he was the executive director of Corporate Affairs of WWE Sdn. Bhd.

== Political activity ==
In 2004, he contested in the 11th General Election as the BN parliamentary candidate in Permatang Pauh. He was defeated by Wan Azizah Wan Ismail, the PKR candidate. He also was an Youth Executive Councillor of UMNO. In 2005, he was elected as the deputy chairman, UMNO of Permatang Pauh Parliamentary Constituency in Bukit Mertajam.

In 2008, he contested again in the 12th General Election as the BN parliamentary candidate in the same parliamentary constituency. He was defeated again by the same PKR candidate. In the Permatang Pauh by-election 2008, he was not chosen to contest.

== Election results ==
Parliament of Malaysia
Year	Constituency	Candidate	Votes	Pct	Opponent(s)	Votes	Pct	Ballots cast	Majority	Turnout
2004	P044 Permatang Pauh	Pirdaus Ismail (UMNO)	21,147	49.31%	Wan Azizah Wan Ismail (PKR)	21,373	50.69%	43,734	590	80.93%
2008	P044 Permatang Pauh	Pirdaus Ismail (UMNO)	16,950	35.84%	Wan Azizah Wan Ismail (PKR)	30,338	64.16%	47,442	13,388	81.17%

== Honours ==
- Penang
  - Officer of the Order of the Defender of State (DSPN) – Dato' (2002)
