= 2008 Permatang Pauh by-election =

- 26 August 2008

Seat of Permatang Pauh
- Registered: 58,459
- Turnout: 80.86%
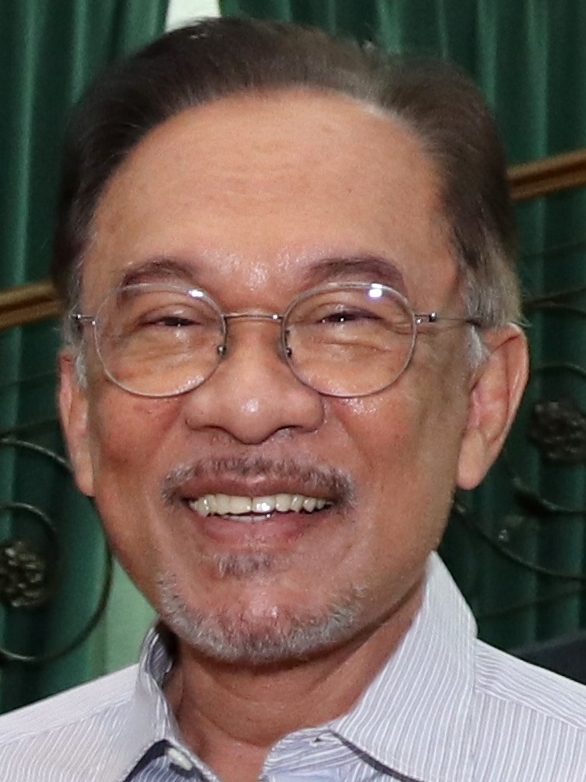
	First party	Second party
		BN
Candidate	Anwar Ibrahim	Arif Shah Omar Shah
Party	PKR	BN
Popular vote	31,195	15,524
Percentage	66.64%	33.16%
Swing	▲2.48%	▼2.68%
MP before election
Wan Azizah Wan Ismail
PKR
Elected MP
Anwar Ibrahim
PKR

A by-election was held for the Dewan Rakyat parliamentary seat of Permatang Pauh on 26 August 2008 with nomination day on 16 August 2008. The seat of Permatang Pauh in the Dewan Rakyat, fell vacant after the resignation of the incumbent, Datuk Seri Wan Azizah Wan Ismail, on 31 July 2008. Wan Azizah was the Leader of the Opposition as well as the President of the Parti Keadilan Rakyat (PKR), a component party of the opposition Pakatan Rakyat (PR) coalition. The by-election was contested by the PR candidate former Deputy Prime Minister Anwar Ibrahim. This election has been dubbed "the mother of all by-elections" by the media due to the potentially significant implication of the election as well as the high profile of Anwar Ibrahim.

Anwar won the election and was sworn into Parliament on 28 August 2008, vowing to topple the government with the help of defectors from Barisan Nasional.

== Background of the by-election ==
On 27 July 2008, Anwar said that he aimed to return to parliament for the first time in a decade later that year if a court ordered a by-election near his home town. The seat mentioned would probably be Kulim-Bandar Baharu constituency next to his hometown of Permatang Pauh in Penang. Anwar Ibrahim on 31 July 2008 said he would contest a by-election for the parliamentary seat of Permatang Pauh vacated by his wife to expedite his return to political office. His wife Wan Azizah said she handed her letter of resignation to the parliament speaker on Thursday 31 July. Party officials said the by-election must be held within 60 days. The Election Commission (EC) had fixed the nomination day for the Permatang Pauh by-election on 16 August, with polling to be held ten days later on 26 August. Some 58,459 voters in the Permatang Pauh constituency would be eligible to vote on 26 August, a working Tuesday, adding that the figure also include 490 postal voters.

Anwar Ibrahim was charged on 7 August 2008 for sodomy under Section 377B of the Penal Code, fueling speculations over a possible conspiracy on the part of the Malaysian government to derail his election campaign.

== Background of Permatang Pauh ==
Parliamentary seat P.44 Permatang Pauh lies in the federal state of Penang. In the 2008 election, Datuk Seri Wan Azizah Wan Ismail of the Parti Keadilan Rakyat (a component party of the Pakatan Rakyat coalition), garnered 30,338 votes, defeating Firdaus Ismail of the United Malay National Organization (UMNO) (a component party of the Barisan Nasional coalition) (16,950 votes) .

== Nominations ==
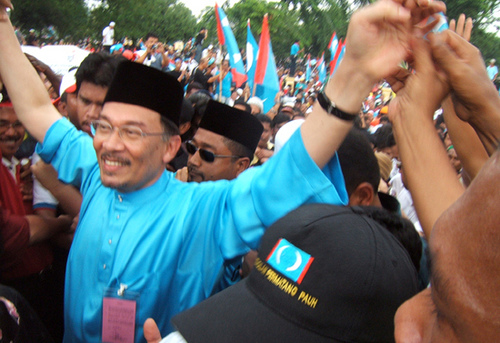
Anwar Ibrahim on the nomination day

Anwar said: "Barisan Nasional is clearly overwhelmed. It's no longer a by-election. It's more than that." Deputy Prime Minister Najib Razak admitted the ruling party was the underdog: "It is going to be an uphill task but nothing is impossible in politics."

== By-election results ==
Early results indicated a landslide victory for Anwar. Reuters reported "Anwar Ibrahim has won with a majority of 16,210 votes. According to news website Malaysiakini: Anwar won 26,646 votes, while the government's Arif Omar won 10,436 votes. Anwar's People's Justice Party spokeswoman Ginie Lim told BBC: "We won already. We are far ahead."

Malaysia's government and ruling coalition declared defeat in a landslide victory in by-election by Anwar Ibrahim. Muhammad Muhammad Taib, information chief of the United Malays National Organisation which leads the Barisan Nasional coalition stated: "Yes of course we have lost . . . we were the underdogs going into this race." Malaysia's Election Commission officials announced Anwar won by an astounding majority against Arif Shah Omar Shah of United Malays National Organisation.

Final results announced by the Election Commission reveals Anwar Ibrahim won 31,195 of the estimated 47,000 votes cast in the district in the northern state of Penang, while rival Arif Shah Omar Shah got only 15,524 votes and a third candidate had 92 votes.

Malaysian general by-election, 26 August 2008: Permatang Pauh The by-election was called due to the resignation of incumbent, Wan Azizah Wan Ismail.
Party	Candidate	Votes	%	∆%
PKR	Anwar Ibrahim	31,195	66.64	+ 2.48
BN	Arif Shah Omar Shah	15,524	33.16	2.68
KITA	Hanafi Mamat	92	0.20	+ 0.20
Total valid votes		46,811	100.00	
Total rejected ballots		447		
Unreturned ballots		10		
Turnout		47,268	80.86	
Registered electors		58,459		
Majority		15,671	33.48	
PKR hold		Swing		
Source(s) "Pilihan Raya Kecil P.044 Permatang Pauh". Election Commission of Malaysia.
