= 2015 Permatang Pauh by-election =

- 7 May 2015

Constituency of Permatang Pauh
- Registered: 71,890
- Turnout: 73.93% (▼14.6%)
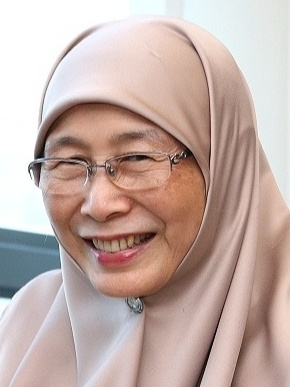
| | | BN |
| Candidate | Wan Azizah Wan Ismail | Suhaimi Sabudin |
| Party | PKR | BN |
| Popular vote | 30,316 | 21,475 |
| Percentage | 58.01% | 41.09% |
| Swing | ▼1.18% | ▲0.60% |
- A map of electoral constituencies within the state of Penang at the time of the by-election, with Permatang Pauh highlighted in yellow.
MP before election
Anwar Ibrahim
PKR
Elected MP
Wan Azizah Wan Ismail
PKR

A by-election was held for the Dewan Rakyat seat of Permatang Pauh on 7 May following the nomination day on 25 April 2015. The seat fell vacant after member of parliament Anwar Ibrahim was disqualified from holding his seat after being found guilty of sodomy in a highly controversial trial. Anwar Ibrahim was a member of the Parti Keadilan Rakyat and leader of the opposition alliance Pakatan Rakyat. In the 2013 general election, Anwar won the seat with a majority of 11,721 votes beating Mazlan Ismail of Barisan Nasional.

The Permatang Pauh by-election was contested by 4 candidates, consisting of former opposition leader, Anwar's wife Wan Azizah Wan Ismail from PKR, UMNO's Suhaimi Sabudin, PRM's Azman Shah Othman and independent candidate Salleh Isahak. There were reports saying that PRM has denied that Azman Shah Othman is a member of their party.

== Campaign ==
Several issues dominate the by-election campaign, with the recently introduced GST being the main issue.

An UMNO branch in Permatang Pauh dissolved during the campaign period, citing neglect by party leadership.

== Results ==
Wan Azizah retained the seat for PR with a majority of just below 9 thousand votes. Mirroring the trend shown in the Rompin by-election two days before, turnout dropped by more than 10% in Permatang Pauh. The lower turnout also means while PKR's majority is lower, their share of popular vote is practically unchanged.

Malaysian general by-election, 7 May 2015: Permatang Pauh The by-election was called due to the disqualification of incumbent, Anwar Ibrahim after being found guilty of sodomy.
| Party | Candidate | Votes | % | ∆% |
|---|---|---|---|---|
| PKR | Wan Azizah Wan Ismail | 30,316 | 58.01 | 1.18 |
| BN | Suhaimi Sabudin | 21,475 | 41.09 | + 0.60 |
| Independent | Salleh Isahak | 367 | 0.70 | + 0.70 |
| Parti Rakyat Malaysia | Azman Shah Othman | 101 | 0.20 | + 0.20 |
| Total valid votes | | 52,259 | 100.00 | |
| Total rejected ballots | | 843 | | |
| Unreturned ballots | | 43 | | |
| Turnout | | 53,145 | 73.93 | |
| Registered electors | | 71,890 | | |
| Majority | | 8,841 | 16.92 | |
| PKR hold | | Swing | | |
Source(s) "Pilihan Raya Kecil P.044 Permatang Pauh". Election Commission of Malaysia. "Federal Government Gazette - Notice of Contested Election - By-election of the Dewan Rakyat of P.044 Permatang Pauh for the State of Penang [P.U. (B) 189/2015]" (PDF). Attorney General's Chambers of Malaysia. 27 April 2015. "P. U. (B) 221/2015 Federal Government Gazette - Results of Contested Election and Statement of the Poll after the Official Addition of Votes for the By-election of P.044 Permatang Pauh" (PDF). Attorney General's Chambers of Malaysia. 13 May 2015.
