= Permatang Pauh (federal constituency) =

Federal constituency of Penang, Malaysia

Permatang Pauh (P044)
Penang constituency

Federal constituency
- Legislature: Dewan Rakyat
- MP: Muhammad Fawwaz Mohamad Jan; PN
- Constituency created: 1974
- First contested: 1974
- Last contested: 2022

Demographics
- Population (2020): 159,989
- Electors (2023): 107,849
- Area (km²): 98
- Pop. density (per km²): 1,632.5

Permatang Pauh is a federal constituency in Central Seberang Perai District, Penang, Malaysia, that has been represented in the Dewan Rakyat since 1974.

The federal constituency was created from parts of the Seberang Tengah constituency in the 1974 redistribution and is mandated to return a single member to the Dewan Rakyat under the first past the post voting system.

The seat was long established as a stronghold of Anwar Ibrahim's family.

Anwar’s father, Ibrahim Abdul Rahman was the Seberang Tengah MP from 1959 to 1969 and the family held the Permatang Pauh seat from 1982 until 2022 when his daughter, Nurul Izzah unexpectedly lost the seat to Perikatan Nasional in the 2022 election.

== Demographics ==
https://live.chinapress.com.my/ge15/parliament/PENANG

Ethnic breakdown of Permatang Pauh's electorate as of 2022
1. Malay (74.2%)
2. Chinese (19.4%)
3. Indian (6.00%)
4. Other ethnicities (0.40%)

As of 2020, Permatang Pauh has a population of 159,989 people.

Age breakdown of Permatang Pauh's electorate as of 2022
1. 18-20 (6.29%)
2. 21-29 (20.9%)
3. 30-39 (21.2%)
4. 40-49 (17.6%)
5. 50-59 (15.7%)
6. 60-69 (11.6%)
7. 70-79 (5.23%)
8. 80-89 (1.32%)
9. above 90 (0.21%)
Gender breakdown of Permatang Pauh's electorate as of 2022
1. Male (49.2%)
2. Female (50.8%)

== History ==
=== Polling districts ===
According to the federal gazette issued on 18 July 2023, the Permatang Pauh constituency is divided into 28 polling districts.

State constituency	Polling districts	Code	Location
Seberang Jaya (N10)	Jalan Sembilang	044/10/01	SMK Seberang Jaya
Seberang Jaya (N10)	Seberang Jaya II	044/10/02	SK Seberang Jaya 2
Seberang Jaya (N10)	Kampong Pertama	044/10/03	SK Permatang To Kandu
Seberang Jaya (N10)	Kampong Belah Dua	044/10/04	SMK Pauh Jaya
Seberang Jaya (N10)	Seberang Jaya I	044/10/05	SK Seberang Jaya
Seberang Jaya (N10)	Jalan Bahru	044/10/06	SK Jalan Bahru Perai
Seberang Jaya (N10)	Simpang Ampat	044/10/07	SMK Permatang Rawa
Seberang Jaya (N10)	Jalan Tuna	044/10/08	SK Seberang Jaya 2
Seberang Jaya (N10)	Taman Tun Hussein Onn	044/10/09	SMK Tun Hussein Onn
Permatang Pasir (N11)	Sama Gagah	044/11/01	SMK Sama Gagah
Permatang Pasir (N11)	Permatang Ara	044/11/02	SK Permatang Pasir
Permatang Pasir (N11)	Permatang Pauh	044/11/03	SK Permatang Pauh
Permatang Pasir (N11)	Bukit Indra Muda	044/11/04	SK Bukit Indera Muda
Permatang Pasir (N11)	Kampong Pelet	044/11/05	SJK (C) Kubang Semang
Permatang Pasir (N11)	Kubang Semang	044/11/06	SK Seri Penanti
Permatang Pasir (N11)	Tanah Liat Mukim 8	044/11/07	SK Seri Penanti
Permatang Pasir (N11)	Kampong Cross Street 2	044/11/08	SM Islam Al-Masriyah
Permatang Pasir (N11)	Permatang Tengah	044/11/09	SJK (C) Lay Keow
Penanti (N12)	Guar Perahu	044/12/01	SMK Guar Perahu
Penanti (N12)	Kuala Mengkuang	044/12/02	SMK Guar Perahu Indah; SK Seri Impian
Penanti (N12)	Telok Wang	044/12/03	Dewan Orang Ramai Kampong Tun Sardon Ara Kuda
Penanti (N12)	Mengkuang	044/12/04	SK Mengkuang
Penanti (N12)	Sungai Lembu	044/12/05	SJK (C) Kg. Sg. Lembu
Penanti (N12)	Penanti	044/12/06	SMK Mengkuang
Penanti (N12)	Kubang Ulu	044/12/07	SMK Penanti
Penanti (N12)	Sungai Semambu	044/12/08	SK Tanah Liat
Penanti (N12)	Tanah Liat Mukim 9	044/12/09	SK Tanah Liat
Penanti (N12)	Berapit Road	044/12/10	SJK (C) Jit Sin A Jalan Berapit; SJK (C) Jit Sin B Jalan Berapit

=== Representation history ===
Members of Parliament for Permatang Pauh
Parliament	No	Years	Member	Party	Vote Share
Constituency created from Seberang Tengah and Seberang Utara
4th	P037	1974–1978	Ariffin Md Daud (عارفين مد داود)	BN (UMNO)	13,645; 78.25%
5th	P037	1978–1982	Zabidi Ali (زبيدي علي)	PAS	11,124; 52.01%
6th	P037	1982–1986	Anwar Ibrahim (أنوار إبراهيم)	BN (UMNO)	18,849; 74.88%
7th	P041	1986–1990	Anwar Ibrahim (أنوار إبراهيم)	BN (UMNO)	17,979; 70.56%
8th	P041	1990–1995	Anwar Ibrahim (أنوار إبراهيم)	BN (UMNO)	23,793; 75.69%
9th	P044	1995–1998	Anwar Ibrahim (أنوار إبراهيم)	BN (UMNO)	27,945; 76.68%
9th	P044	1998–1999	Anwar Ibrahim (أنوار إبراهيم)	Independent	27,945; 76.68%
9th	P044	1999	Vacant		
10th	P044	1999–2004	Wan Azizah Wan Ismail (وان عزيزة وان إسماعيل)	BA (keADILan)	23,820; 61.77%
11th	P044	2004–2008	Wan Azizah Wan Ismail (وان عزيزة وان إسماعيل)	PKR	21,737; 50.69%
12th	P044	2008	Wan Azizah Wan Ismail (وان عزيزة وان إسماعيل)	PR (PKR)	30,348; 64.16%
12th	P044	2008–2013	Anwar Ibrahim (أنوار إبراهيم)	PR (PKR)	31,195; 66.64%
13th	P044	2013–2015	Anwar Ibrahim (أنوار إبراهيم)	PR (PKR)	37,090; 59.19%
13th	P044	2015–2018	Wan Azizah Wan Ismail (وان عزيزة وان إسماعيل)	PH (PKR)	30,316; 58.01%
14th	P044	2018–2022	Nurul Izzah Anwar (نور العزّة أنوار)	PH (PKR)	35,534; 50.89%
15th	P044	2022–present	Muhammad Fawwaz Mohamad Jan (محمّد فوّاز محمد جن)	PN (PAS)	37,638; 43.04%

=== State constituency ===
Parliamentary constituency	State constituency						
Parliamentary constituency	1955–1959*	1959–1974	1974–1986	1986–1995	1995–2004	2004–2018	2018–present
Permatang Pauh			Kubang Semang				
Permatang Pauh			Penanti				
Permatang Pauh				Permatang Pasir			
Permatang Pauh				Seberang Jaya			
Permatang Pauh			Sungai Dua				

=== Historical boundaries ===
State Constituency	Area				
State Constituency	1974	1984	1994	2003	2018
Kubang Semang	Guar Perahu; Permatang Janggus; Permatang Pasir; Permatang Pauh; Permatang To Kandu				
Penanti	Ara Kuda; Mengkuang Titi; Padang Menora; Sungai Lembu; Tanah Liat	Guar Perahu; Mengkuang Titi; Penanti; Sungai Lembu; Tanah Liat	Guar Perahu; Kampung Kuala Mengkuang; Mengkuang Titi; Penanti; Sungai Lembu		
Permatang Pasir		Guar Jering; Permatang Janggus; Permatang Pasir; Permatang Pauh; Permatang To Kandu	Kampung Cross Street; Kubang Semang; Permatang Janggus; Permatang Pasir; Permatang Pauh		
Seberang Jaya		Bandar Perda; Bukit Tengah; Seberang Jaya; Seri Tenggiri; Taman Nagasari	Bandar Perda; Permatang Rawa; Permatang To Kandu; Seberang Jaya; Seri Tenggiri		
Sungai Dua	Ara Rendang; Denai Desa; Padang Tonson; Permatang Buloh; Sungai Dua				

=== Current state assembly members ===
No.	State Constituency	Member	Coalition (Party)
N10	Seberang Jaya	Izhar Shah Arif Shah	PN (BERSATU)
N11	Permatang Pasir	Amir Hamzah Abdul Hashim	PN (PAS)
N12	Penanti	Zulkefli Bakar	PN (BERSATU)

=== Local governments & postcodes ===
No.	State Constituency	Local Government	Postcode
N10	Seberang Jaya	Seberang Perai City Council	13500 Permatang Pauh; 13700 Perai; 14000 Bukit Mertajam; 14400 Kubang Semang
N11	Permatang Pasir	Seberang Perai City Council	13500 Permatang Pauh; 13700 Perai; 14000 Bukit Mertajam; 14400 Kubang Semang
N12	Penanti	Seberang Perai City Council	13500 Permatang Pauh; 13700 Perai; 14000 Bukit Mertajam; 14400 Kubang Semang

== Election results ==
Malaysian general election, 2022
Party	Candidate	Votes	%	∆%
PN	Muhammad Fawwaz Mohamad Jan	37,638	43.04	▲43.04
PH	Nurul Izzah Anwar	32,366	37.01	▼13.88
BN	Mohd Zaidi Mohd Zaid	16,971	19.41	▼9.04
GTA	Mohamad Nasir Osman	473	0.54	▲0.54
Total valid votes		87,448	100.00	
Total rejected ballots		648		
Unreturned ballots		158		
Turnout		88,254	82.34	▼4.08
Registered electors		107,186		
Majority		5,272	6.03	▼16.41
PN gain from PH		Swing		?
Source(s) https://lom.agc.gov.my/ilims/upload/portal/akta/outputp/1753273/PUB609%20(2022).pdf

Malaysian general election, 2018
Party	Candidate	Votes	%	∆%
PH	Nurul Izzah Anwar	35,534	50.89	▲50.89
BN	Mohd Zaidi Mohd Said	19,866	28.45	▼12.64
PAS	Afnan Hamimi Taib Azamudden	14,428	20.66	▲9.49
Total valid votes		69,828	100.00	
Total rejected ballots		658		
Unreturned ballots		200		
Turnout		70,686	86.42	▲12.49
Registered electors		81,789		
Majority		15,668	22.44	▲5.52
PH hold		Swing		
Source(s) "His Majesty's Government Gazette - Notice of Contested Election, Parliament for the State of Penang [P.U. (B) 236/2018]" (PDF). Attorney General's Chambers of Malaysia. 3 May 2018. "Federal Government Gazette - Results of Contested Election and Statements of the Poll after the Official Addition of Votes, Parliamentary Constituencies for the State of Penang [P.U. (B) 310/2018]" (PDF). Attorney General's Chambers of Malaysia. 28 May 2018. "Keputusan PRU-14: Nurul Izzah menang di Parlimen Permatang Pauh". Kosmo! Online. 10 May 2018. Archived from the original on 11 May 2018.

Malaysian general by-election, 7 May 2015 The by-election was called due to the disqualification of incumbent, Anwar Ibrahim after being found guilty of sodomy.
Party	Candidate	Votes	%	∆%
PKR	Wan Azizah Wan Ismail	30,316	58.01	▼1.18
BN	Suhaimi Sabudin	21,475	41.09	▲0.60
Independent	Salleh Isahak	367	0.70	▲0.70
Parti Rakyat Malaysia	Azman Shah Othman	101	0.20	▲0.20
Total valid votes		52,259	100.00	
Total rejected ballots		843		
Unreturned ballots		43		
Turnout		53,145	73.93	▼14.60
Registered electors		71,890		
Majority		8,841	16.92	▼1.78
PKR hold		Swing		
Source(s) "Pilihan Raya Kecil P.044 Permatang Pauh". Election Commission of Malaysia. "Federal Government Gazette - Notice of Contested Election - By-election of the Dewan Rakyat of P.044 Permatang Pauh for the State of Penang [P.U. (B) 189/2015]" (PDF). Attorney General's Chambers of Malaysia. 27 April 2015. Archived from the original (PDF) on 2019-12-29. "P. U. (B) 221/2015 Federal Government Gazette - Results of Contested Election and Statement of the Poll after the Official Addition of Votes for the By-election of P.044 Permatang Pauh" (PDF). Attorney General's Chambers of Malaysia. 13 May 2015.

Malaysian general election, 2013
Party	Candidate	Votes	%	∆%
PKR	Anwar Ibrahim	37,090	59.19	▼7.45
BN	Mazlan Ismail	25,369	40.49	▲7.33
Independent	Abdullah Zawawi Samsudin	201	0.32	▲0.32
Total valid votes		62,660	100.00	
Total rejected ballots		672		
Unreturned ballots		143		
Turnout		63,475	88.53	▲7.67
Registered electors		71,699		
Majority		11,721	18.70	▼14.78
PKR hold		Swing		
Source(s) "Federal Government Gazette - Notice of Contested Election, Parliament for the State of Penang [P.U. (B) 173/2013]" (PDF). Attorney General's Chambers of Malaysia. 26 April 2013. "Federal Government Gazette - Results of Contested Election and Statements of the Poll after the Official Addition of Votes, Parliamentary Constituencies for the State of Penang [P.U. (B) 214/2013]" (PDF). Attorney General's Chambers of Malaysia. 22 May 2013. Archived from the original (PDF) on 22 March 2019.

Malaysian general by-election, 26 August 2008 The by-election was called due to the resignation of incumbent, Wan Azizah Wan Ismail.
Party	Candidate	Votes	%	∆%
PKR	Anwar Ibrahim	31,195	66.64	▲2.48
BN	Arif Shah Omar Shah	15,524	33.16	▼2.68
KITA	Hanafi Mamat	92	0.20	▲0.20
Total valid votes		46,811	100.00	
Total rejected ballots		447		
Unreturned ballots		10		
Turnout		47,268	80.86	▼1.20
Registered electors		58,459		
Majority		15,671	33.48	▲5.16
PKR hold		Swing		
Source(s) "Pilihan Raya Kecil P.044 Permatang Pauh". Election Commission of Malaysia.

Malaysian general election, 2008
Party	Candidate	Votes	%	∆%
PKR	Wan Azizah Wan Ismail	30,348	64.16	▲13.47
BN	Pirdaus Ismail	16,950	35.84	▼13.47
Total valid votes		47,298	100.00	
Total rejected ballots		636		
Unreturned ballots		29		
Turnout		47,963	82.06	▲1.13
Registered electors		58,449		
Majority		13,398	28.32	▲26.94
PKR hold		Swing		

Malaysian general election, 2004
Party	Candidate	Votes	%	∆%
PKR	Wan Azizah Wan Ismail	21,737	50.69	▼11.08
BN	Pirdaus Ismail	21,147	49.31	▲11.08
Total valid votes		42,884	100.00	
Total rejected ballots		665		
Unreturned ballots		185		
Turnout		43,734	80.93	▲1.99
Registered electors		54,039		
Majority		590	1.38	▼22.16
PKR hold		Swing		

Malaysian general election, 1999
Party	Candidate	Votes	%	∆%
PKR	Wan Azizah Wan Ismail	23,820	61.77	▲61.77
BN	Ibrahim Saad	14,743	38.23	▼38.45
Total valid votes		38,563	100.00	
Total rejected ballots		647		
Unreturned ballots		0		
Turnout		39,210	78.94	▲0.64
Registered electors		49,670		
Majority		9,077	23.54	▼40.99
PKR gain from BN		Swing		?

Malaysian general election, 1995
Party	Candidate	Votes	%	∆%
BN	Anwar Ibrahim	27,945	76.68	▲0.99
DAP	Abdul Rahman Manap	4,430	12.15	▲12.15
PAS	Mazani Abdullah	4,071	11.17	▼13.14
Total valid votes		36,446	100.00	
Total rejected ballots		889		
Unreturned ballots		50		
Turnout		37,385	78.30	▼0.02
Registered electors		47,745		
Majority		23,515	64.53	▲13.15
BN hold		Swing		

Malaysian general election, 1990
Party	Candidate	Votes	%	∆%
BN	Anwar Ibrahim	23,793	75.69	▲5.13
PAS	Mahfuz Omar	7,643	24.31	▼5.13
Total valid votes		31,436	100.00	
Total rejected ballots		304		
Unreturned ballots		0		
Turnout		31,740	78.32	▲3.50
Registered electors		40,526		
Majority		16,150	51.38	▲10.26
BN hold		Swing		

Malaysian general election, 1986
Party	Candidate	Votes	%	∆%
BN	Anwar Ibrahim	17,979	70.56	▼4.32
PAS	Mohamad Sabu	7,500	29.44	▲11.57
Total valid votes		25,479	100.00	
Total rejected ballots		619		
Unreturned ballots		0		
Turnout		26,098	74.82	▼5.13
Registered electors		34,879		
Majority		10,479	41.12	▼15.89
BN hold		Swing		

Malaysian general election, 1982
Party	Candidate	Votes	%	∆%
BN	Anwar Ibrahim	18,849	74.88	▲26.89
PAS	Zabidi Ali	4,497	17.87	▼34.14
DAP	Tan Ah Huat	1,825	7.25	▲7.25
Total valid votes		25,171	100.00	
Total rejected ballots		714		
Unreturned ballots		0		
Turnout		25,885	79.95	▼0.86
Registered electors		32,378		
Majority		14,352	57.01	▲52.99
BN gain from PAS		Swing		?

Malaysian general election, 1978
Party	Candidate	Votes	%	∆%
PAS	Zabidi Ali	11,124	52.01	▲52.01
BN	Ariffin Md Daud	10,264	47.99	▼30.26
Total valid votes		21,388	100.00	
Total rejected ballots		849		
Unreturned ballots		0		
Turnout		22,237	80.81	▲0.96
Registered electors		27,516		
Majority		860	4.02	▼63.06
PAS gain from BN		Swing		?

Malaysian general election, 1974
Party	Candidate	Votes	%
BN	Ariffin Md Daud	13,645	78.25
PEKEMAS	Abu Bakar Munir	1,948	11.17
Parti Rakyat Malaysia	Paharuddin Ibrahim	1,844	10.58
Total valid votes		17,437	100.00
Total rejected ballots		659	
Unreturned ballots		0	
Turnout		18,096	79.85
Registered electors		21,942	
Majority		11,697	67.08
This was a new constituency created out of Seberang Tengah which went to Gerakan in the previous election.
