= Seberang Tengah =

Penang constituency

Defunct federal constituency
- Legislature: Dewan Rakyat
- Constituency created: 1958
- Constituency abolished: 1974
- First contested: 1959
- Last contested: 1969

Seberang Tengah was a federal constituency in Penang, Malaysia, that was represented in the Dewan Rakyat from 1959 to 1974.

The federal constituency was created from parts of the Wellesley North constituency in the 1958 redistribution and was mandated to return a single member to the Dewan Rakyat under the first past the post voting system. Its last election was in 1969. It disappeared in the 1974 election and was split into Bukit Mertajam and Permatang Pauh.

== History ==
It was abolished in 1974 when it was redistributed.

=== Representation history ===
Members of Parliament for Seberang Tengah
Parliament	No	Years	Member	Party	Vote Share
Constituency created from Wellesley South
Parliament of the Federation of Malaya
1st	P032	1959–1963	Ibrahim Abdul Rahman (إبراهيم عبدالرحمن)	Alliance (UMNO)	9,187; 45.53%
Parliament of Malaysia
1st	P032	1963–1964	Ibrahim Abdul Rahman (إبراهيم عبدالرحمن)	Alliance (UMNO)	9,187; 45.53%
2nd	P032	1964–1969	Ibrahim Abdul Rahman (إبراهيم عبدالرحمن)	Alliance (UMNO)	15,660; 55.22%
		1969–1971	Parliament was suspended		
3rd	P032	1971–1972	Mustapha Hussain (مصطفى حسين)	GERAKAN	16,808; 58.31%
3rd	P032	1972–1974	Mustapha Hussain (مصطفى حسين)	PEKEMAS	16,808; 58.31%
Constituency abolished, split into Bukit Mertajam and Permatang Pauh

=== State constituency ===
Parliamentary constituency	State constituency						
Parliamentary constituency	1955–1959*	1959–1974	1974–1986	1986–1995	1995–2004	2004–2018	2018–present
Seberang Tengah		Alma					
Seberang Tengah		Bukit Mertajam					
Seberang Tengah		Permatang Pauh					

=== Historical boundaries ===
State Constituency	Area
State Constituency	1959
Alma	Bukit Minyak; Cherok Tok Kun; Machang Bubok; Juru; Permatang Tinggi
Bukit Mertajam	Berapit; Bukit Mertajam; Kampung Cross Street; Taman Bukit Noning; Tanah Liat
Permatang Pauh	Bukit Tengah; Mengkuang Titi; Penanti; Permatang Pasir; Seberang Jaya

== Election results ==
Malaysian general election, 1969: Seberang Tengah
Party	Candidate	Votes	%	∆%
GERAKAN	Mustapha Hussain	16,808	58.31	▲58.31
Alliance	Ibrahim Abdul Rahman	12,017	41.69	▼13.53
Total valid votes		28,825	100.00	
Total rejected ballots		2,516		
Unreturned ballots		0		
Turnout		31,341	75.85	▼6.05
Registered electors		41,319		
Majority		4,791	16.62	▼12.20
GERAKAN gain from Alliance		Swing		?

Malaysian general election, 1964: Seberang Tengah
Party	Candidate	Votes	%	∆%
Alliance	Ibrahim Abdul Rahman	15,660	55.22	▲9.69
Socialist Front	Kam Yau Wah	7,486	26.40	▼12.80
UDP	Ooh Chooi Cheng	5,215	18.39	▲18.39
Total valid votes		28,361	100.00	
Total rejected ballots		943		
Unreturned ballots		0		
Turnout		29,304	81.90	▲5.62
Registered electors		35,780		
Majority		8,174	28.82	▲22.49
Alliance hold		Swing		

Malayan general election, 1959: Seberang Tengah
Party	Candidate	Votes	%
Alliance	Ibrahim Abdul Rahman	9,187	45.53
Socialist Front	Kang Eng Wah	7,910	39.20
PMIP	Abdul Hamid	3,082	15.27
Total valid votes		20,179	100.00
Total rejected ballots		244	
Unreturned ballots		0	
Turnout		20,423	76.28
Registered electors		26,773	
Majority		1,277	6.33
This was a new constituency created out of Wellesley North which went to Alliance in the previous election.
