= Muhammad Fawwaz Mohamad Jan =

Malaysian politician

Yang Berhormat Tuan Haji Muhammad Fawwaz Mohamad Jan MP
- محمّد فوّاز محمد جن

Member of the Malaysian Parliament for Permatang Pauh
- Incumbent
- Assumed office 19 November 2022
- Preceded by: Nurul Izzah Anwar (PH–PKR)
- Majority: 5,272 (2022)

Personal details
- Born: Muhammad Fawwaz bin Mohamad Jan; 1983 (age 42–43) Penang, Malaysia
- Party: Malaysian Islamic Party (PAS)
- Other political affiliations: Perikatan Nasional (PN)
- Spouse(s): Siti Noor Kamariah Ramli; Unimaya Wan Chek
- Children: 11
- Parents: Mohamad Jan Din (father); Kamariah Abdul Latif (mother)
- Education: Al-Azhar University
- Occupation: Politician

Muhammad Fawwaz bin Mohamad Jan is a Malaysian politician who has served as the Member of Parliament (MP) for Permatang Pauh since November 2022. He is a member and the Penang State Information Chief of the Malaysian Islamic Party (PAS), a component party of the Perikatan Nasional (PN) coalition. His victory in the 2022 general election was a significant upset, as he defeated the incumbent MP, Nurul Izzah Anwar, the daughter of Prime Minister Anwar Ibrahim ending the family's 40-year hold on the parliamentary seat. As MP for Permatang Pauh, he has been controversial, attempting to ban the sale of alcohol to non-Muslims at Sunway Carnival Mall and making seditious remarks on social media. Additionally, he sparked outrage in Parliament by claiming that low-income students have ‘big appetite’ and are resorting to sugar dating.

== Election results ==
Parliament of Malaysia
Year	Constituency	Candidate	Votes	Pct	Opponent(s)	Votes	Pct	Ballots cast	Majority	Turnout
2022	P044 Permatang Pauh	Muhammad Fawwaz Mohamad Jan (PAS)	37,638	43.04%	Nurul Izzah Anwar (PKR)	32,366	37.01%	87,448	5,272	81.59%
2022	P044 Permatang Pauh	Muhammad Fawwaz Mohamad Jan (PAS)	37,638	43.04%	Mohd Zaidi Mohd Zaid (UMNO)	16,971	19.41%	87,448	5,272	81.59%
2022	P044 Permatang Pauh	Muhammad Fawwaz Mohamad Jan (PAS)	37,638	43.04%	Mohamad Nasir Osman (PUTRA)	473	0.54%	87,448	5,272	81.59%

Penang State Legislative Assembly
Year	Constituency	Candidate	Votes	%	Opponent(s)	Votes	%	Ballots cast	Majority	Turnout
2018	N12 Penanti	Muhammad Fawwaz Mohamad Jan (PAS)	4,791	26.20%	Norlela Ariffin (PKR)	8,221	44.95%	18,526	2,944	86.40%
2018	N12 Penanti	Muhammad Fawwaz Mohamad Jan (PAS)	4,791	26.20%	Suhaimi Sabudin (UMNO)	5,277	28.85%	18,526	2,944	86.40%

== Honours ==
=== Honours of Malaysia ===
- Malaysia
  - Recipient of the 17th Yang di-Pertuan Agong Installation Medal (2024)
