= Arif Shah Omar Shah =

Malaysian politician

Yang Berbahagia Datuk Arif Shah Omar Shah DMSM PJK
- عارف شاه عمر شاه

Member of the Penang State Legislative Assembly for Seberang Jaya
- In office 2004–2013
- Preceded by: Raden Muhamad Amin Raden Hadi Munir (BN–UMNO)
- Succeeded by: Afif Bahardin (PR–PKR)
- Majority: 4,464 (2004); 533 (2008)

Personal details
- Born: 2 November 1956 (age 69)
- Citizenship: Malaysia
- Party: United Malays National Organisation (UMNO)
- Other political affiliations: Barisan Nasional (BN)
- Spouse: Datin Latifah Asmawi
- Children: Izhar Shah Arif Shah

Yang Berbahagia Datuk Arif Shah bin Haji Omar Shah (born 2 November 1956) is a Malaysian politician. He had served as Member of Penang State Legislative Assembly for Seberang Jaya from 2004 to 2013. He is a member of the United Malays National Organisation (UMNO), a component party of Barisan Nasional (BN). He was nicknamed by the local Chinese community as "pek moh" (白毛), meaning "white hair" in Hokkien, because he was full of white hair.

== Early life and education ==
Arif Shah was born on 2 November 1956. Arif Shah can speak Mandarin and Hokkien due to his early education at SRJK(C) Hun Lian, Taiping, Perak and followed by primary school extension at SRJK(C) Chong Hwa Wei Sin, Kuala Terengganu, Terengganu. He then continued his education at SMJK(C) Chong Hwa Wei Sin, Kuala Terengganu and continued his studies at Chong Hwa High School, Gombak, Kuala Lumpur. After his graduation from the high school, he studied at the Federal Institute of Technology majoring in civil engineering, then to Graber International, California, United States in the department of building materials.

== Misidentification ==
On 15 March 2008, a demonstration was held in front of the Komtar building, Penang. The demonstration was broadcast by TV3 and RTM. They were orchestrated by the opposition in the Penang State Legislative Assembly. There was a newspaper that wrongly reported that Arif Shah was also present in this gathering, because the picture showed a white-haired man who was thought to be Arif Shah, but was actually Musa Sheikh Fadzir. They objected to the announcement of then-Chief Minister of Penang, Lim Guan Eng to abolish the New Economic Policy and replaced it with the Malaysian Economic Agenda.

== Election results ==
Penang State Legislative Assembly
Year	Constituency	Candidate	Votes	Pct	Opponent(s)	Votes	Pct	Ballots cast	Majority	Turnout
2004	N10 Seberang Jaya	Arif Shah Omar Shah (UMNO)	10,113	64.16%	Mansor Othman (PKR)	5,649	35.84%	15,962	4,464	79.48%
2008	N10 Seberang Jaya	Arif Shah Omar Shah (UMNO)	9,395	51.50%	Ramli Bulat (PKR)	8,862	48.50%	18,493	533	81.54%

Parliament of Malaysia
Year	Constituency	Candidate	Votes	Pct	Opponent(s)	Votes	Pct	Ballots cast	Majority	Turnout
2008	P044 Permatang Pauh	Arif Shah Omar Shah (UMNO)	15,524	33.16%	Anwar Ibrahim (PKR)	31,195	66.64%	47,258	15,671	80.84%
2008	P044 Permatang Pauh	Arif Shah Omar Shah (UMNO)	15,524	33.16%	Hanafi Mamat (AKIM)	92	0.20%	47,258	15,671	80.84%

== Honours ==
=== Honours of Malaysia ===
- Penang
  - Meritorious Service Medal (PJK)
- Malacca
  - Companion Class I of the Exalted Order of Malacca (DMSM) – Datuk (2007)
