= Zulkefli Bakar =

Malaysian politician

Yang Berhormat Tuan Zulkefli Bakar MLA
- ذولكفلي بكر

Member of the Penang State Legislative Assembly for Penanti
- Incumbent
- Assumed office 12 August 2023
- Preceded by: Norlela Ariffin (PH–PKR)
- Majority: 3,575 (2023)

Personal details
- Born: Zulkefli bin Bakar
- Citizenship: Malaysian
- Party: Malaysian United Indigenous Party (BERSATU)
- Other political affiliations: Perikatan Nasional (PN)
- Occupation: Politician

Zulkefli bin Bakar is a Malaysian politician who served as Member of the Penang State Legislative Assembly (MLA) for Penanti since August 2023. He is a member of Malaysian United Indigenous Party (BERSATU), a component party of Perikatan Nasional (PN) coalitions.

== Political career ==
Zulkefli is currently the Chairman of BERSATU Penang and BERSATU Permatang Pauh division.

== Election results ==
Penang State Legislative Assembly
Year	Constituency	Candidate	Votes	Pct	Opponent(s)	Votes	Pct	Ballots cast	Majority	Turnout
2023	N12 Penanti	Zulkefli Bakar (BERSATU)	12,586	58.28%	Rohsidi Hussain (PKR)	9,011	41.72%	21,745	3,575	77.16%
