= Seberang Jaya (state constituency) =

State constituency in Penang, Malaysia

Seberang Jaya (N10)
Penang constituency

State constituency
- Legislature: Penang State Legislative Assembly
MLA
Izhar Shah Arif Shah
PN
- Constituency created: 1986
- First contested: 1986
- Last contested: 2023

Demographics
- Population (2020): 93,836
- Electors (2023): 49,215
- Area (km²): 22

Seberang Jaya is a state constituency in Penang, Malaysia, that has been represented in the Penang State Legislative Assembly.

The state constituency was first contested in 1986 and is mandated to return a single Assemblyman to the Penang State Legislative Assembly under the first-past-the-post voting system.

== Definition ==
=== Polling districts ===
According to the federal gazette issued on 30 March 2018, the Seberang Jaya constituency is divided into 9 polling districts.

State constituency	Polling districts	Code	Location
Seberang Jaya (N10)	Jalan Sembilang	044/10/01	SMK Seberang Jaya
Seberang Jaya (N10)	Seberang Jaya II	044/10/02	SK Seberang Jaya 2
Seberang Jaya (N10)	Kampong Pertama	044/10/03	SK Permatang To Kandu
Seberang Jaya (N10)	Kampong Belah Dua	044/10/04	SMK Pauh Jaya
Seberang Jaya (N10)	Seberang Jaya I	044/10/05	SK Seberang Jaya
Seberang Jaya (N10)	Jalan Bahru	044/10/06	SK Jalan Bahru Perai
Seberang Jaya (N10)	Simpang Ampat	044/10/07	SMK Permatang Rawa
Seberang Jaya (N10)	Jalan Tuna	044/10/08	SK Seberang Jaya 2
Seberang Jaya (N10)	Taman Tun Hussein Onn	044/10/09	SMK Tun Hussein Onn

== Demographics ==
Ethnic breakdown of Seberang Jaya's electorate as of 2023
1. Malay (68.5%)
2. Chinese (18.2%)
3. Indian (12.1%)
4. Other ethnicities (1.11%)

Total electors by polling district in 2016
Polling district	Electors
Jalan Sembilang	4,144
Seberang Jaya II	3,749
Kampong Pertama	1,966
Kampong Belah Dua	2,931
Seberang Jaya I	3,627
Jalan Bahru	3,949
Simpang Ampat	4,183
Jalan Tuna	3,564
Taman Tun Hussien Onn	3,140
Total	31,253
Source: Malaysian Election Commission

== History ==
Penang State Legislative Assemblyman for Seberang Jaya
Assembly	No	Years	Member	Party
Constituency split from Bukit Tengah
7th	N10	1986 – 1990	Ibrahim Saad	BN (UMNO)
8th	N10	1990 – 1995	Ibrahim Saad	BN (UMNO)
9th	N10	1995 – 1999	Abdul Latiff S. Mirasa	BN (UMNO)
10th	N10	1999 – 2004	Radin Muhamad Amin Radin Hadi Munir	BN (UMNO)
11th	N10	2004 – 2008	Arif Shah Omar Shah	BN (UMNO)
12th	N10	2008 – 2013	Arif Shah Omar Shah	BN (UMNO)
13th	N10	2013 – 2015	Afif Bahardin	PR (PKR)
13th	N10	2015 – 2018	Afif Bahardin	PH (PKR)
14th	N10	2018 – 2020	Afif Bahardin	PH (PKR)
14th	N10	2020 – 2023	Afif Bahardin	PN (BERSATU)
14th	N10	2023	Vacant (Note: Vacant from 6 March 2023 until the 2023 state election due to the incumbent was vacated from his seat in an approved motion in the Penang State Assembly along with 3 other BERSATU assemblymen.)	
15th	N10	2023–present	Izhar Shah Arif Shah	PN (BERSATU)

== Election results ==
Penang state election, 2023
Party	Candidate	Votes	%	∆%
PN	Izhar Shah Arif Shah	20,877	56.69	▲56.69
PH	Johari Kassim	15,951	43.31	▼9.79
Total valid votes		36,828	100.00	
Total rejected ballots		173		
Unreturned ballots		53		
Turnout		37,054	75.29	▼10.51
Registered electors		49,215		
Majority		4,926	13.38	▼11.22
PN gain from PKR		Swing		?

Penang state election, 2018
Party	Candidate	Votes	%	∆%
PKR	Afif Bahardin	16,014	53.10	▼1.10
BN	Abu Bakar Sidekh Zainul Abidin	8,593	28.50	▼16.30
PAS	Ahmad Rafaei Rashid	5,540	18.40	▲18.40
Total valid votes		30,147	100.00	
Total rejected ballots		268		
Unreturned ballots		81		
Turnout		30,496	85.80	▼2.20
Registered electors		35,541		
Majority		7,421	24.60	▲15.20
PKR hold		Swing		
Source(s) "His Majesty's Government Gazette - Notice of Contested Election, State Legislative Assembly for the State of Penang [P.U. (B) 252/2018]" (PDF). Attorney General's Chambers of Malaysia. 3 May 2018. "Federal Government Gazette - Results of Contested Election and Statements of the Poll after the Official Addition of Votes, State Constituencies for the State of Penang [P.U. (B) 326/2018]" (PDF). Attorney General's Chambers of Malaysia. 28 May 2018.

Penang state election, 2013
Party	Candidate	Votes	%	∆%
PKR	Afif Bahardin	14,148	54.20	▲5.70
BN	Mohammad Nasir Abdullah	11,689	44.80	▼6.70
Independent	Shamsut Tabrej Ismail Maricar	251	1.00	▲1.00
Total valid votes		26,088	100.00	
Total rejected ballots		274		
Unreturned ballots		0		
Turnout		26,362	88.00	▲6.46
Registered electors		29,964		
Majority		2,459	9.40	▲6.40
PKR gain from BN		Swing		?
Source(s) "Federal Government Gazette - Notice of Contested Election, State Legislative Assembly for the State of Penang [P.U. (B) 189/2013]" (PDF). Attorney General's Chambers of Malaysia. 26 April 2013. "Federal Government Gazette - Results of Contested Election and Statements of the Poll after the Official Addition of Votes, State Constituencies for the State of Penang [P.U. (B) 230/2013]" (PDF). Attorney General's Chambers of Malaysia. 22 May 2013. Archived from the original (PDF) on 2019-03-22.

Penang state election, 2008
Party	Candidate	Votes	%	∆%
BN	Arif Shah Omar Shah	9,395	51.50	▼12.66
PKR	Ramli Bulat	8,862	48.50	▲12.66
Total valid votes		18,257	100.00	
Total rejected ballots		222		
Unreturned ballots		14		
Turnout		18,493	81.54	▲2.06
Registered electors		22,171		
Majority		533	3.00	▼25.32
BN hold		Swing		

Penang state election, 2004
Party	Candidate	Votes	%	∆%
BN	Arif Shah Omar Shah	10,113	64.16	▲11.11
PKR	Mansor Othman	5,649	35.84	▼11.11
Total valid votes		15,762	100.00	
Total rejected ballots		178		
Unreturned ballots		22		
Turnout		15,962	79.48	▲1.75
Registered electors		20,084		
Majority		4,464	28.32	▲22.22
BN hold		Swing		

Penang state election, 1999
Party	Candidate	Votes	%	∆%
BN	Radin Muhamad Amin Radin Hadi Munir	7,423	53.05	▼31.04
PKR	Hairuddin Othman	6,570	46.95	▲46.95
Total valid votes		13,993	100.00	
Total rejected ballots		209		
Unreturned ballots		3		
Turnout		14,205	77.73	▼0.34
Registered electors		18,275		
Majority		853	6.10	▼62.08
BN hold		Swing		

Penang state election, 1995
Party	Candidate	Votes	%	∆%
BN	Abdul Latiff S. Mirasa	11,063	84.09	▲11.04
DAP	Noor Halil Abd Ghani	2,093	15.91	▼11.04
Total valid votes		13,156	100.00	
Total rejected ballots		372		
Unreturned ballots		26		
Turnout		13,554	78.07	▼0.40
Registered electors		17,362		
Majority		8,970	68.18	▲22.08
BN hold		Swing		

Penang state election, 1990
Party	Candidate	Votes	%	∆%
BN	Ibrahim Saad	8,757	73.05	▲14.67
DAP	Yeow Yu Beng	3,230	26.95	▼2.42
Total valid votes		11,987	100.00	
Total rejected ballots		396		
Unreturned ballots		0		
Turnout		12,383	78.47	▲4.22
Registered electors		15,781		
Majority		5,527	46.10	▲17.09
BN hold		Swing		

Penang state election, 1986
Party	Candidate	Votes	%
BN	Ibrahim Saad	4,939	58.38
DAP	Yeow Yu Beng	2,485	29.37
PAS	Koh Ah Toung @ Kamal Koh Abdullah	1,036	12.25
Total valid votes		8,460	100.00
Total rejected ballots		189	
Unreturned ballots		0	
Turnout		8,649	74.25
Registered electors		11,649	
Majority		2,454	29.01
This was a new constituency created.

== See also ==
- Constituencies of Penang
