= Norlela Ariffin =

Malaysian politician

Yang Berbahagia Dato' Dr. Norlela Ariffin DSPN
- نورليلة عارفين

Member of the Penang State Legislative Assembly for Penanti
- In office 5 May 2013 – 12 August 2023
- Preceded by: Mansor Othman (PR–PKR)
- Succeeded by: Zulkefli Bakar (PN–BERSATU)
- Majority: 2,339 (2013); 2,944 (2018)

Member of the Penang State Executive Council
- 2020–2023: Chairwoman of the Agriculture, Agro-based Industries, Rural Development and Health

Faction represented in the Penang State Legislative Assembly
- 2013–2018: People's Justice Party
- 2018–2023: Pakatan Harapan

Personal details
- Born: Norlela binti Ariffin; 5 April 1963 (age 63) Penang, Federation of Malaya
- Citizenship: Malaysian
- Party: People's Justice Party (PKR)
- Other political affiliations: Pakatan Harapan (PH); Pakatan Rakyat (PR)
- Occupation: Politician

Norlela binti Ariffin (born 5 April 1963) is a Malaysian politician who served as Member of the Penang State Executive Council (EXCO) in the Pakatan Harapan (PH) state administration under Chief Minister Chow Kon Yeow from 2020 to 2023 and Member of the Penang State Legislative Assembly (MLA) for Penanti from May 2013 to August 2023. She is a member of the People's Justice Party (PKR), a component party of the PH and formerly Pakatan Rakyat (PR) coalitions.

== Election results ==
Penang State Legislative Assembly
Year	Constituency	Candidate	Votes	Pct	Opponent(s)	Votes	Pxt	Ballots cast	Majority	Turnout
2013	N12 Penanti	Norlela Ariffin (PKR)	9,387	57.12%	Ibrahim Ahmad (UMNO)	7,048	42.88%	16,626	2,339	88.50%
2018	N12 Penanti	Norlela Ariffin (PKR)	8,221	44.95%	Suhaimi Sabudin (UMNO)	5,277	28.85%	18,526	2,944	86.40%
2018	N12 Penanti	Norlela Ariffin (PKR)	8,221	44.95%	Muhammad Fawwaz Mohamad Jan (PAS)	4,791	26.20%	18,526	2,944	86.40%

== Honours ==
- Penang
  - Officer of the Order of the Defender of State (DSPN) – Dato' (2023)
