= Wan Azizah Wan Ismail =

Malaysian politician (born 1952)

Yang Berhormat Dato' Seri Dr Wan Azizah Wan Ismail DPPN MP
- وان عزيزة وان إسماعيل
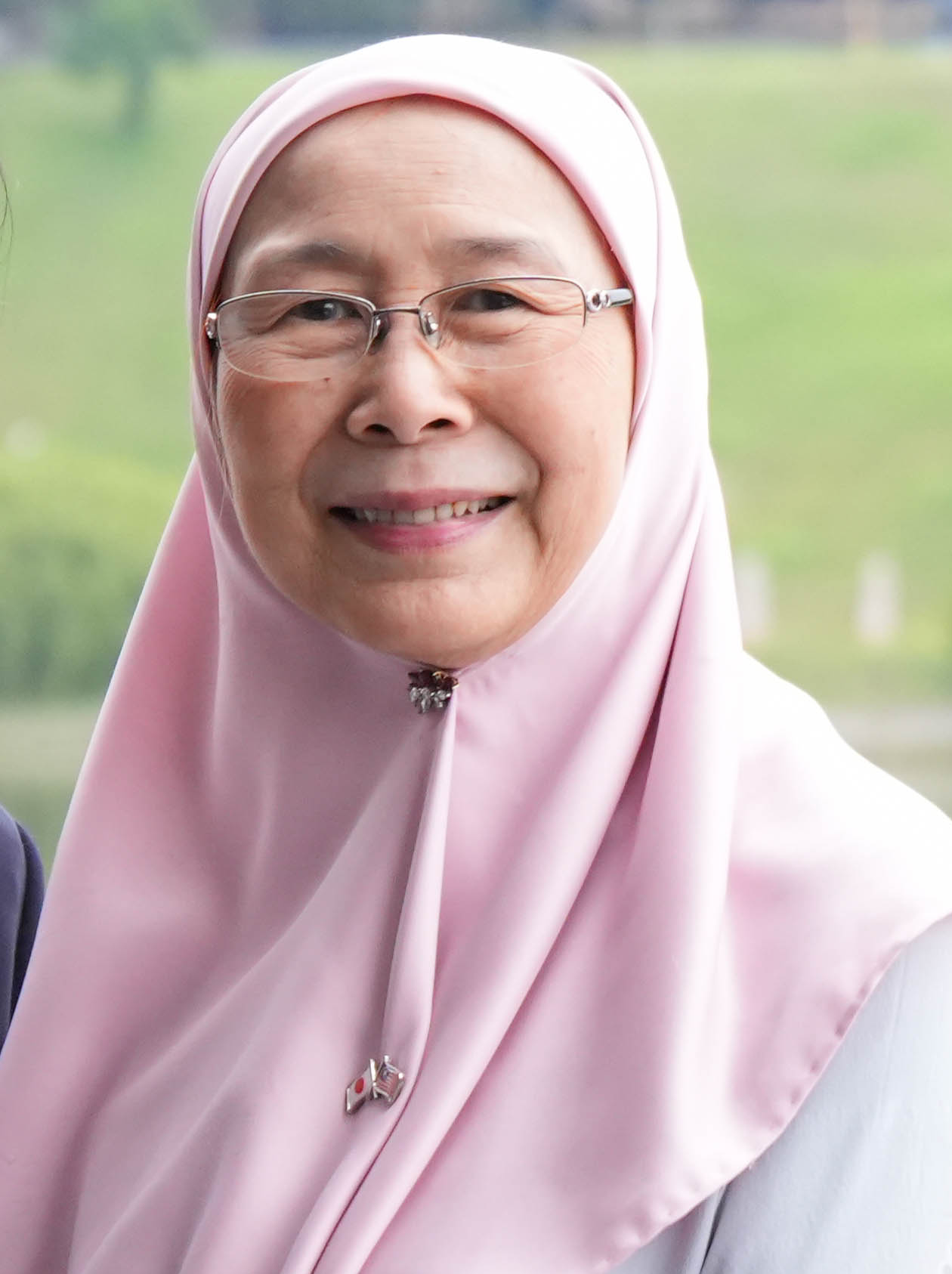
- Wan Azizah in 2025

Spouse of the Prime Minister of Malaysia
- Incumbent
- Assumed role 24 November 2022
- Prime Minister: Anwar Ibrahim
- Preceded by: Muhaini Zainal Abidin

12th Deputy Prime Minister of Malaysia (Note: Serving simultaneously as the Minister of Women, Family and Community Development.)
- In office 21 May 2018 – 25 February 2020
- Monarchs: Muhammad V (2018–2019); Abdullah (2019–2020)
- Prime Minister: Mahathir Mohamad
- Preceded by: Ahmad Zahid Hamidi
- Succeeded by: Ismail Sabri Yaakob

11th and 13th Leader of the Opposition
- In office 18 May 2015 – 10 May 2018
- Monarchs: Abdul Halim (2015–2016); Muhammad V (2016–2019)
- Prime Minister: Najib Razak
- Preceded by: Anwar Ibrahim
- Succeeded by: Ahmad Zahid Hamidi
- Constituency: Permatang Pauh
- In office 9 March 2008 – 28 August 2008
- Monarch: Mizan Zainal Abidin
- Prime Minister: Abdullah Ahmad Badawi
- Preceded by: Lim Kit Siang
- Succeeded by: Anwar Ibrahim
- Constituency: Permatang Pauh

Spouse of the Deputy Prime Minister of Malaysia
- In role 1 December 1993 – 2 September 1998
- Prime Minister: Mahathir Mohamad
- Deputy: Anwar Ibrahim
- Preceded by: Dayang Heryati Abdul Rahim
- Succeeded by: Endon Mahmood
Party leadership
1st President of the Pakatan Harapan
Incumbent
Assumed office 14 July 2017
Deputy	Lim Guan Eng (2017–2022); Anthony Loke (since 2022); Mohamad Sabu; Wilfred Madius Tangau (2021–2023); Ewon Benedick (2023–2025)
Chairman	Mahathir Mohamad (2017–2020); Anwar Ibrahim (since 2020)
Preceded by	Position established
1st President of the People's Justice Party
In office 4 April 1999 – 17 November 2018
Deputy	Chandra Muzaffar (1999–2001); Syed Husin Ali (2003–2010); Azmin Ali (2010–2018)
Preceded by	Position established
Succeeded by	Anwar Ibrahim
Parliamentary offices
Member of the Malaysian Parliament for Bandar Tun Razak
Incumbent
Assumed office 19 November 2022
Preceded by	Kamaruddin Jaafar
Majority	9,817 (2022)
Member of the Malaysian Parliament for Pandan
In office 9 May 2018 – 19 November 2022
Preceded by	Rafizi Ramli
Succeeded by	Rafizi Ramli
Majority	52,543 (2018)
Member of the Malaysian Parliament for Permatang Pauh
In office 7 May 2015 – 9 May 2018
Preceded by	Anwar Ibrahim
Succeeded by	Nurul Izzah Anwar
Majority	8,841 (2015)
In office 29 November 1999 – 31 July 2008
Preceded by	Anwar Ibrahim
Succeeded by	Anwar Ibrahim
Majority	9,077 (1999); 590 (2004); 13,388 (2008)
Member of the Selangor State Legislative Assembly for Kajang
In office 7 April 2014 – 9 May 2018
Preceded by	Lee Chin Cheh
Succeeded by	Hee Loy Sian
Majority	5,379 (2014)

Personal details
- Born: 3 December 1952 (age 73) Colony of Singapore
- Citizenship: Malaysia
- Party: Keadilan (1999–2003); People's Justice Party (2003–present)
- Spouse: Anwar Ibrahim (m. 1980)
- Relations: Ibrahim Abdul Rahman (father-in-law)
- Children: 6, including Nurul Izzah
- Education: Royal College of Surgeons in Ireland
- Occupation: Politician; ophthalmologist

Wan Azizah binti Wan Ismail (Note: Jawi: وان عزيزة وان إسماعيل) (born 3 December 1952) is a Malaysian politician and the current spouse of the prime minister of Malaysia as the wife of Anwar Ibrahim. She first entered parliament in 1999, and has served as Member of Parliament (MP) for Bandar Tun Razak since 2022 as a member of the People's Justice Party. She is the first woman to serve as deputy prime minister of Malaysia, a position she held from 2018 to 2020.

Born in the Colony of Singapore, Wan Azizah graduated from the Royal College of Surgeons in Ireland. She practised medicine, specialised in ophthalmology, and served as a government doctor for 14 years before leaving in 1993. Entering politics in 1998 after her husband's dismissal as the 7th deputy prime minister of Malaysia, she led the Reformasi movement and founded the National Justice Party (PKN), later People's Justice Party (PKR), becoming the second woman to lead a parliamentary party in Malaysia. She won the Permatang Pauh seat in 1999, retained it in 2004, and briefly stepped aside in 2008 for her husband's return, but continued to lead PKR as it grew into an opposition force.

Wan Azizah became Malaysia's first female leader of the Opposition in April 2008, but resigned later that year to allow her husband to succeed her. During her time in opposition, she spoke out on human rights issues, and was active in domestic debates on Malay supremacy, governance, and land issues. She continued her political career, winning the Kajang by-election in 2014 and later reclaiming Permatang Pauh in 2015. She won the Pandan seat in 2018 and became Malaysia's first female deputy prime minister, while also serving as minister of women, family and community development. She left office during the 2020 political crisis but returned to the Dewan Rakyat in 2022 after winning the Bandar Tun Razak seat. Following her husband's appointment as prime minister that year, she became the spouse of the prime minister.

== Early life and education ==
Wan Azizah was born on 3 December 1952 in Singapore. Her father was Wan Ismail Wan Mahmood, and her mother, Mariah Khamis, raised her along with her three sisters and one brother. She is of Peranakan Chinese descent and was raised as a Malay Muslim. She began her education at St. Nicholas Convent School before continuing her secondary studies at Tunku Kurshiah College. She went on to study medicine at the Royal College of Surgeons in Ireland, where she received a gold medal in obstetrics and gynaecology.

Wan Azizah established a medical practice where she primarily treated women, later specialising in ophthalmology. She served as a government doctor for 14 years before resigning in 1993. That same year, she shifted from her medical career to roles more closely associated with political life, taking on honorary positions, hosting visiting dignitaries, and becoming a patron of the National Cancer Council.

== Early political career ==
Wan Azizah entered politics in September 1998 following the dismissal and arrest of her husband Anwar Ibrahim on charges of sodomy and corruption. The event drew widespread domestic and international criticism and led her to assume leadership of the Reformasi movement. (Note: Reformasi was a political movement that evolved into a wider push for democracy, human rights, and political reform in Malaysia.) She founded the Social Justice Movement, later named the National Justice Party (PKN) in April 1999. She was the second woman in Malaysia to lead a political party and the first to do so with parliamentary representation after winning the Permatang Pauh seat with a 9,077-vote majority that year.

She promoted reform and attempted to unite opposition forces to confront Mahathir's government, although she was unsuccessful in preventing his party from retaining a supermajority in the 1999 general election. Wan Azizah rejected the idea of Malay unity as the central political issue following the election. Instead, she argued that Malay support had shifted to the opposition due to disillusionment with leadership, abuses of power, corruption, police brutality, mismanagement of the economy, and a judiciary that was seen to lack independence.

In August 2003, PKN merged with the Malaysian People's Party (PRM) to become the People's Justice Party (PKR), with Wan Azizah as president. She contested the 2004 general election on the ticket of the new party and retained the Permatang Pauh seat by a margin of 590 votes and became the PKR's sole representative in Parliament. In 2007, Wan Azizah indicated her readiness to vacate the party presidency when Anwar announced his intention to return to politics despite being legally barred. She also relinquished the Permatang Pauh parliamentary seat, allowing Anwar, running as a PKR candidate, to win the by-election. Under her continued leadership, the PKR won 31 seats in the 2008 general election, during which she defended her Permatang Pauh seat with a majority of 13,388 votes.

== Leader of the Opposition ==
On 30 April 2008, Wan Azizah became the first woman to hold the post of Leader of the Opposition. Her position was acknowledged during coalition negotiations by the Malaysian United Indigenous Party, led by Mahathir Mohamad and Muhyiddin Yassin. This recognition helped sustain the PKR's leadership role within the opposition despite internal divisions and uncertainty over succession. That same year, Wan Azizah sent a letter to Myanmar's ambassador expressing concern over the military junta's decision to proceed with a constitutional referendum despite the ongoing Cyclone Nargis crisis. She submitted a motion urging Speaker Pandikar Amin Mulia to call for a postponement of the vote, to prioritise relief efforts and to press the regime to grant greater access to aid workers. She also called on the Malaysian government to use its influence to advocate for a delay, though the motion was rejected on the grounds of Malaysia's policy of neutrality and noninterference. Her tenure as opposition leader ended on 28 August 2008, when she resigned to make way for her husband, who succeeded her.

In 2010, Wan Azizah Wan Ismail called for the abolition of Malay supremacy, highlighting its exploitation by a small elite and advocating for Malaysian children to grow up as "Malay of Integrity." In June 2011, she faced a RM200 million defamation suit filed by Federal Land Development Authority (Felda) over articles in Suara Keadilan, with the High Court deciding her case would be heard separately from a related suit against former deputy minister Tan Kee Kwong. In April 2012, she urged Felda to return 306,000 acres (124,000 ha) of Sabah land, arguing the agency had failed to develop it for settlers and had converted it into profitable palm oil plantations. In 2013, she confirmed she would not contest the general election, focusing instead on the PKR's campaign and engaging women voters.

In 2014, the High Court ruled in favour of Felda, raising the defamation damages Wan Azizah and her co-defendants were required to pay from RM70,000 to RM2 million. Later that year, on 9 March, the PKR selected Wan Azizah as its candidate for the Kajang by-election, and she won the seat on 23 March with a majority of 5,379 votes. In August, she received support from the Pan-Malaysian Islamic Party to lead Selangor, a move by the opposition to challenge the long-ruling UMNO-led Barisan Nasional (BN) coalition, which had faced criticism over governance and ethnic policies.

Wan Azizah later contested the Permatang Pauh seat for the PKR, winning with a majority of 8,841 votes, and was sworn in as opposition leader on 18 May 2015, reclaiming the seat vacated by Anwar following his imprisonment in February. In 2016, she helped forge an alliance between the opposition coalition and Mahathir's Malaysian United Indigenous Party. By January 2018, the coalition, known as the Alliance of Hope, designated Mahathir as its prime ministerial candidate and Wan Azizah as his prospective deputy, uniting diverse factions and contributing to BN's defeat in the 2018 general election. Wan Azizah subsequently contested and won the Pandan seat with a majority of 52,543 votes.

== Deputy Prime Minister ==
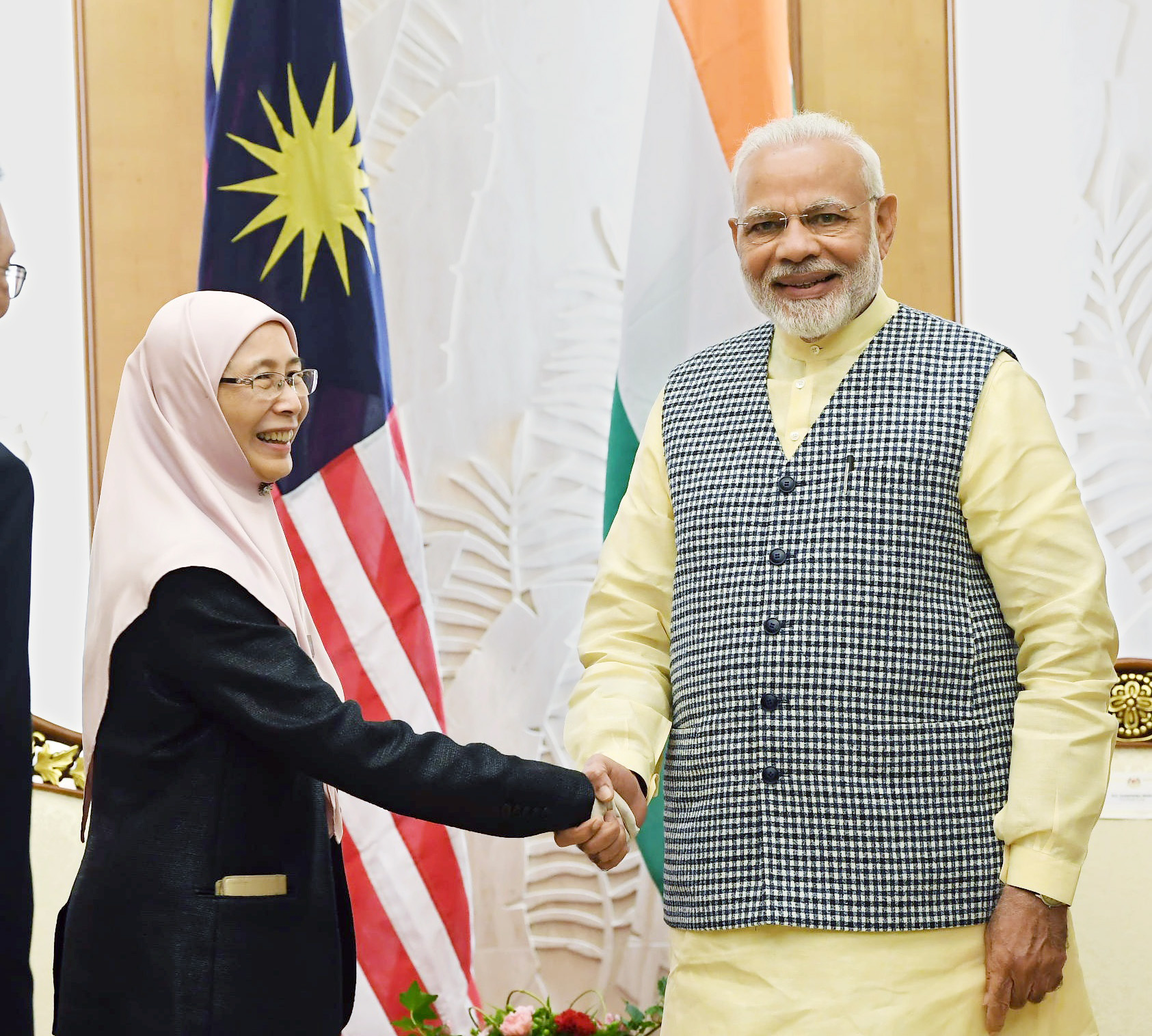
Wan Azizah and Narendra Modi in 2018

Following the general election, she was appointed as deputy prime minister in the seventh Mahathir cabinet and took office on 21 May 2018 after securing 64,733 votes. She became the first woman to hold the position and was sworn in before Muhammad V of Kelantan at Istana Negara, alongside 13 other cabinet ministers, while also serving concurrently as minister of women, family and community development.

During her time in office, Wan Azizah made several diplomatic visits. On 26 February 2019, she held a meeting with Hassanal Bolkiah during her first official visit to Brunei. Later that year, on 9 July, she met with Vice President of China Wang Qishan at Zhongnanhai. On 12 February 2020, she publicly honoured three women whistle-blowers from the Auditor General's Office for exposing tampering in the 1MDB audit report, praising their courage and calling for greater female involvement in anti-corruption efforts. On the following day, she urged women's empowerment and greater engagement at an APEC symposium in Putrajaya, highlighting the need for education, advocacy, and safe reporting channels to combat corruption.

According to former attorney-general Tommy Thomas, Wan Azizah was the preferred candidate of Abdullah of Pahang for interim prime minister following Mahathir's resignation in February 2020. She officially left office on 25 February 2020. Her tenure as deputy prime minister ended when Abdullah dissolved the cabinet on Mahathir's advice, amid the 2020 political crisis, which involved the resignation and interim reinstatement of the prime minister. Her successor, Ismail Sabri Yaakob, was appointed later, in July 2021, by Prime Minister Muhyiddin.

== Spouse of Prime Minister ==
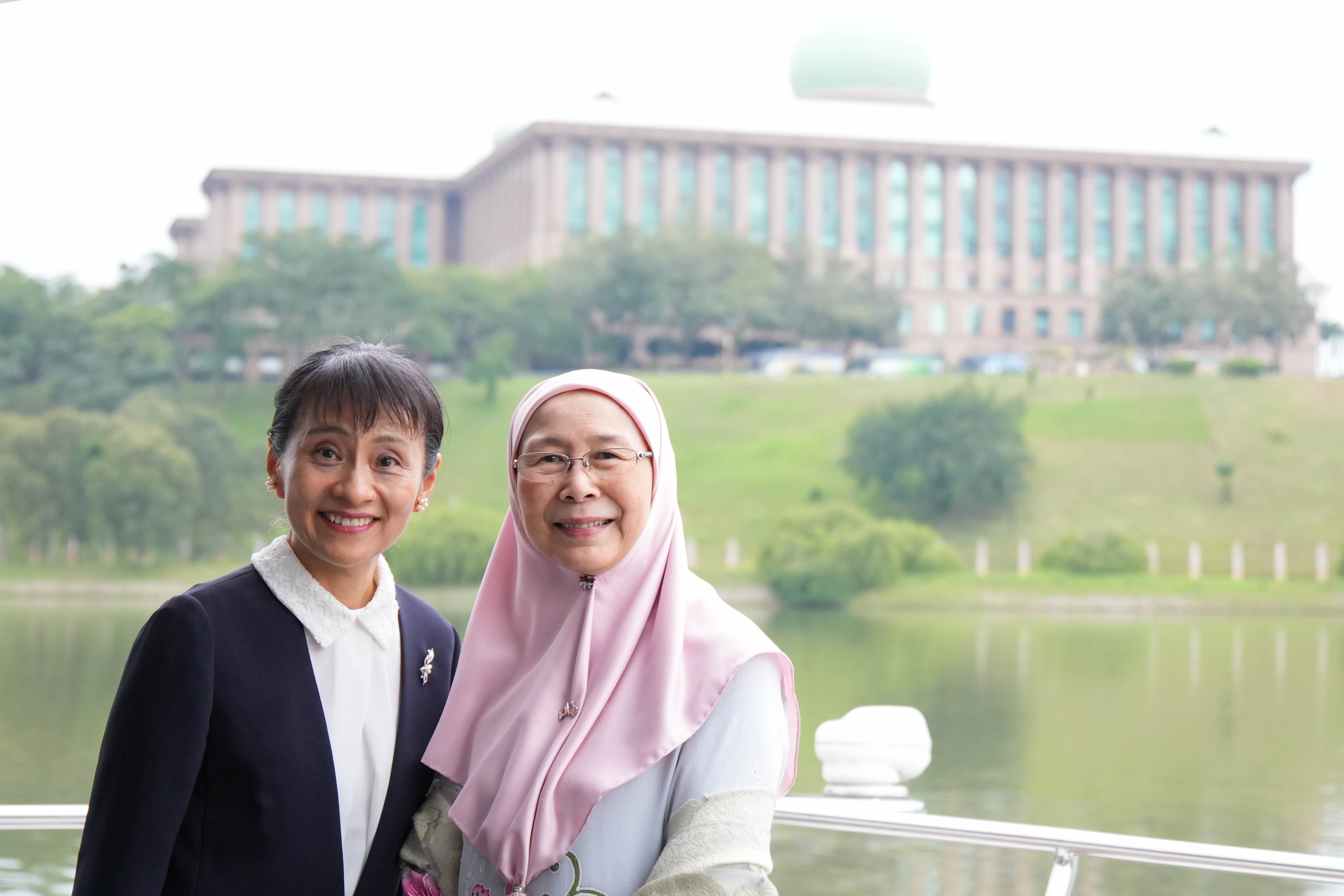
Yoshiko Ishiba and Wan Azizah in 2025

In the 2022 general election on 19 November, Wan Azizah won the Bandar Tun Razak parliamentary seat with a majority of 9,817 votes, defeating candidates from Perikatan Nasional and BN. Her husband was sworn in as Malaysia's prime minister on 24 November 2022, making her the spouse of the Prime Minister of Malaysia. She later participated in a mental health discussion at the APEC United States 2023 on 17 November, hosted by Jill Biden, where she highlighted concerns over artificial intelligence and data privacy's impact on mental well-being. On 9 September 2024, Wan Azizah called for global action to end the Gaza war and prioritise rebuilding educational institutions, emphasising that education is a fundamental right and vital for children's survival. On 10 January 2025, she welcomed Yoshiko Ishiba, wife of Shigeru Ishiba, in Putrajaya.

== Personal life ==
Wan Azizah married Anwar Ibrahim on 28 February 1980, and the couple have six children, the eldest being Nurul Izzah, a member of parliament. In November 2022, she declared assets worth about RM1.4 million, including RM1 million in cash and savings and four vehicles valued at RM360,000, with no debts, property, or other investments. She accompanied her husband to perform Umrah on 12 November 2023, where they also prayed for peace and prosperity in Palestine following the OIC Extraordinary Summit in Riyadh. In October 2024, Wan Azizah underwent a medical procedure at Sultan Idris Shah Hospital in Serdang.

== Election results ==
Parliament of Malaysia
Year	Constituency	Candidate	Votes	Pct	Opponent(s)	Votes	Pct	Ballots cast	Majority	Turnout
1999	P044 Permatang Pauh	Wan Azizah Wan Ismail (keADILan)	23,820	61.77%	Ibrahim Saad (UMNO)	14,743	38.23%	39,210	9,077	78.94%
2004	P044 Permatang Pauh	Wan Azizah Wan Ismail (PKR)	21,737	50.69%	Pirdaus Ismail (UMNO)	21,147	49.31%	43,734	590	80.93%
2008	P044 Permatang Pauh	Wan Azizah Wan Ismail (PKR)	30,338	64.16%	Pirdaus Ismail (UMNO)	16,950	35.84%	47,442	13,388	81.17%
2015	P044 Permatang Pauh	Wan Azizah Wan Ismail (PKR)	30,316	57.09%	Suhaimi Sabudin (UMNO)	21,475	40.44%	53,102	8,841	74.53%
2018	P100 Pandan	Wan Azizah Wan Ismail (PKR)	64,733	75.47%	Leong Kok Wee (MCA)	12,190	14.21%	85,774	52,543	84.66%
2018	P100 Pandan	Wan Azizah Wan Ismail (PKR)	64,733	75.47%	Mohamed Sukri Omar (PAS)	8,335	9.72%	85,774	52,543	84.66%
2018	P100 Pandan	Wan Azizah Wan Ismail (PKR)	64,733	75.47%	Lee Ying Ha (PRM)	442	0.52%	85,774	52,543	84.66%
2018	P100 Pandan	Wan Azizah Wan Ismail (PKR)	64,733	75.47%	Wan Muhd Azri Wan Deris (IND)	73	0.09%	85,774	52,543	84.66%
2022	P124 Bandar Tun Razak	Wan Azizah Wan Ismail (PKR)	43,476	46.74%	Kamarudin Jaffar (BERSATU)	33,659	36.18%	93,021	9,817	78.74%
2022	P124 Bandar Tun Razak	Wan Azizah Wan Ismail (PKR)	43,476	46.74%	Chew Yin Keen (MCA)	15,886	17.08%	93,021	9,817	78.74%

Selangor State Legislative Assembly
Year	Constituency	Candidate	Votes	Pct	Opponent(s)	Votes	Pct	Ballots cast	Majority	Turnout
2014	N25 Kajang	Wan Azizah Wan Ismail (PKR)	16,741	59.57%	Chew Mei Fun (MCA)	11,362	40.43%	28,314	5,379	72.09%

== Awards and honours ==
In 2008, Wan Azizah was awarded the Order of the Defender of State, carrying the title Datuk Seri, during Penang's state honours in recognition of her contributions to public service and leadership. She later received an honorary fellowship from the Academy of Medicine Malaysia on 7 July 2023, followed by an honorary Doctorate of Philosophy in Political and Social Sciences from the University of Selangor on 9 September 2023. She also had a new orchid hybrid named after her, during the launch of Orkid Putrajaya 2023, on 14 December of that year.

On 26 April 2025, she was awarded the Lifetime Achievement Award in Ophthalmology by the Malaysian Society of Ophthalmology for her contributions to eye care and medical education. On 14 June 2025, she was conferred the Eminent Educator Award by Nazrin Shah of Perak for her role in advancing medical education and the Parallel Pathway training programme in Malaysia.

- Penang
  - Grand Commander of the Order of the Defender of State (DPPN) – Dato' Seri (2008)

== Notes ==
Party political offices
Preceded by Position established	President of the People's Justice Party; 1999–2018	Succeeded by Anwar Ibrahim
Preceded by Position established	Leader of the People's Pact; 2008	Succeeded by Anwar Ibrahim
Parliament of Malaysia
Preceded by Anwar Ibrahim	Member of the Dewan Rakyat for Permatang Pauh; 1999–2008	Succeeded by Anwar Ibrahim
Preceded by Anwar Ibrahim	Member of the Dewan Rakyat for Permatang Pauh; 2015–2018	Succeeded by Nurul Izzah Anwar
Preceded by Rafizi Ramli	Member of the Dewan Rakyat for Pandan; 2018–present	Incumbent
Political offices
Preceded by Lim Kit Siang	Leader of the Opposition; 2008, 2015–2018	Succeeded by Anwar Ibrahim
Preceded by Anwar Ibrahim	Leader of the Opposition; 2008, 2015–2018	Succeeded by Ahmad Zahid Hamidi
Preceded by Ahmad Zahid Hamidi	Deputy Prime Minister of Malaysia; 2018–2020	Succeeded by Ismail Sabri Yaakob
