= Penanti (state constituency) =

State constituency in Penang, Malaysia

Penanti (N12)
Penang constituency

State constituency
- Legislature: Penang State Legislative Assembly
MLA
Zulkefli Bakar
PN
- Constituency created: 1974
- First contested: 1974
- Last contested: 2023

Demographics
- Electors (2023): 28,170
- Area (km²): 47

Penanti is a state constituency in Penang, Malaysia, that has been represented in the Penang State Legislative Assembly.

The state constituency was first contested in 1974 and is mandated to return a single Assemblyman to the Penang State Legislative Assembly under the first-past-the-post voting system. Since 2013, the State Assemblywoman for Penanti is Norlela Ariffin from the Parti Keadilan Rakyat (PKR), which is part of the state's ruling coalition, Pakatan Harapan (PH).

== Definition ==
=== Polling districts ===
According to the federal gazette issued on 30 March 2018, the Penanti constituency is divided into 12 polling districts.

State constituency	Polling districts	Code	Location
Penanti (N12)	Guar Perahu	044/12/01	SMK Guar Perahu
Penanti (N12)	Kuala Mengkuang	044/12/02	SMK Guar Perahu Indah
Penanti (N12)	Telok Wang	044/12/03	Dewan Orang Ramai Kampong Tun Sardon Ara Kuda
Penanti (N12)	Mengkuang	044/12/04	SK Mengkuang
Penanti (N12)	Sungai Lembu	044/12/05	SJK (C) Kg. Sg. Lembu
Penanti (N12)	Penanti	044/12/06	SMK Mengkuang
Penanti (N12)	Kubang Ulu	044/12/07	SMK Penanti
Penanti (N12)	Sungai Semambu	044/12/08	SK Tanah Liat
Penanti (N12)	Tanah Liat Mukim 9	044/12/09	SK Tanah Liat
Penanti (N12)	Berapit Road	044/12/10	SJK (C) Jit Sin A Jalan Berapit; SJK (C) Jit Sin B Jalan Berapit

== Demographics ==
Ethnic breakdown of Penanti's electorate as of 2023
1. Malay (79.8%)
2. Chinese (17.8%)
3. Indian (1.65%)
4. Other ethnicities (0.78%)

Total electors by polling district in 2016
Polling district	Electors
Guar Perahu	2,395
Kuala Mengkuang	4,234
Telok Wang	692
Mengkuang	2,524
Sungai Lembu	529
Penanti	1,207
Kubang Ulu	1,651
Sungai Semambu	2,188
Tanah Liat Mukim 9	2,352
Berapit Road	1,563
Total	19,335
Source: Malaysian Election Commission

== History ==
Penang State Legislative Assemblyman for Penanti
Assembly	No	Years	Member	Party
Constituency created from Permatang Pauh, Tasek Glugor and Bukit Mertajam
4th	N09	1974 – 1978	Abdullah Mohamad @ Mahmud	BN (UMNO)
5th	N09	1978 – 1982	Abdullah Mohamad @ Mahmud	BN (UMNO)
6th	N09	1982 – 1986	Jusoh @ Yusoff Helmi Shafie	BN (UMNO)
7th	N12	1986 – 1990	Yahaya Jamaluddin	BN (UMNO)
8th	N12	1990 – 1995	Ahmad Saad	BN (UMNO)
9th	N12	1995 – 1999	Daud Taha	BN (UMNO)
10th	N12	1999 – 2004	Abdul Rahman Abdul Kadir	BA (KeADILan)
11th	N12	2004 – 2008	Abdul Jalil Abdul Majid	BN (UMNO)
12th	N12	2008 – 2009	Mohammad Fairus Khairuddin	PR (PKR)
12th	N12	2009 - 2013	Mansor Othman	PR (PKR)
13th	N12	2013 – 2015	Norlela Ariffin	PR (PKR)
13th	N12	2015 – 2018	Norlela Ariffin	PH (PKR)
14th	N12	2018 – 2023	Norlela Ariffin	PH (PKR)
15th	N12	2023–present	Zulkefli Bakar	PN (BERSATU)

== Election results ==
The electoral results for the Penanti state constituency are as follows.

Penang state election, 2023
Party	Candidate	Votes	%	∆%
PN	Zulkefli Bakar	12,586	58.28	▲58.28
PH	Ustaz Rohsidi Hussain	9,011	41.72	▼3.28
Total valid votes		21,597	100.00	
Total rejected ballots		110		
Unreturned ballots		28		
Turnout		21,745	77.16	▼9.24
Registered electors		28,170		
Majority		3,575	16.56	▲0.36
PN gain from PKR		Swing		?

Penang state election, 2018
Party	Candidate	Votes	%	∆%
PKR	Norlela Ariffin	8,221	45.00	▼12.10
BN	Suhaimi Sabudin	5,277	28.80	▼14.10
PAS	Muhammad Fawwaz Mohamad Jan	4,791	26.20	▲26.20
Total valid votes		18,289	100.00	
Total rejected ballots		176		
Unreturned ballots		61		
Turnout		18,526	86.40	▼2.10
Registered electors		21,437		
Majority		2,944	16.20	▲2.00
PKR hold		Swing		
Source(s) "His Majesty's Government Gazette - Notice of Contested Election, State Legislative Assembly for the State of Penang [P.U. (B) 252/2018]" (PDF). Attorney General's Chambers of Malaysia. 3 May 2018. "Federal Government Gazette - Results of Contested Election and Statements of the Poll after the Official Addition of Votes, State Constituencies for the State of Penang [P.U. (B) 326/2018]" (PDF). Attorney General's Chambers of Malaysia. 28 May 2018. Archived from the original (PDF) on 29 August 2019.

Penang state election, 2013
Party	Candidate	Votes	%	∆%
PKR	Norlela Ariffin	9,387	57.10	▼29.43
BN	Ibrahim Ahmad	7,048	42.90	▲42.90
Total valid votes		16,435	100.00	
Total rejected ballots		230		
Unreturned ballots		0		
Turnout		16,665	88.50	▲42.34
Registered electors		18,830		
Majority		2,339	14.20	▼65.27
PKR hold		Swing		
Source(s) "Federal Government Gazette - Notice of Contested Election, State Legislative Assembly for the State of Penang [P.U. (B) 189/2013]" (PDF). Attorney General's Chambers of Malaysia. 26 April 2013. "Federal Government Gazette - Results of Contested Election and Statements of the Poll after the Official Addition of Votes, State Constituencies for the State of Penang [P.U. (B) 230/2013]" (PDF). Attorney General's Chambers of Malaysia. 22 May 2013. Archived from the original (PDF) on 22 March 2019.

Penang state by-election, 31 May 2009 The by-election was called due to the resignation of incumbent, Mohammad Fairus Khairuddin.
Party	Candidate	Votes	%	∆%
PKR	Mansor Othman	6,052	86.53	▲27.63
Independent	Nai Khan Ari Nai Keow	494	7.06	▲7.06
Independent	Aminah Abdullah	392	5.60	▲5.60
Independent	Kamarul Ramizu Idris	56	0.80	▲0.80
Total valid votes		6,994	100.00	
Total rejected ballots		107		
Unreturned ballots		1		
Turnout		7,102	46.16	▼35.94
Registered electors		15,384		
Majority		5,558	79.47	▲61.67
PKR hold		Swing		
Source(s) "Pilihan Raya Kecil N.12 Penanti". Election Commission of Malaysia.

Penang state election, 2008
Party	Candidate	Votes	%	∆%
PKR	Mohammad Fairus Khairuddin	7,346	58.90	▲11.74
BN	Abdul Jalil Abdul Majid	5,127	41.10	▼11.74
Total valid votes		12,473	100.00	
Total rejected ballots		184		
Unreturned ballots		10		
Turnout		12,667	82.10	▲1.64
Registered electors		15,421		
Majority		2,219	17.80	▲12.12
PKR gain from BN		Swing		?

Penang state election, 2004
Party	Candidate	Votes	%	∆%
BN	Abdul Jalil Abdul Majid	6,195	52.84	▲12.00
PKR	Anuar Shaari	5,528	47.16	▼12.00
Total valid votes		11,723	100.00	
Total rejected ballots		192		
Unreturned ballots		0		
Turnout		11,915	80.46	▲1.85
Registered electors		14,808		
Majority		667	5.68	▼12.64
BN gain from PKR		Swing		?

Penang state election, 1999
Party	Candidate	Votes	%	∆%
PKR	Abdul Rahman Abdul Kadir	6,405	59.16	▲59.16
BN	Zukefly Bakar	4,422	40.84	▼42.14
Total valid votes		10,827	100.00	
Total rejected ballots		267		
Unreturned ballots		0		
Turnout		11,094	78.61	▲0.55
Registered electors		14,112		
Majority		1,983	18.32	▼47.64
PKR gain from BN		Swing		?

Penang state election, 1995
Party	Candidate	Votes	%	∆%
BN	Daud Taha	8,577	82.98	▲7.86
S46	Adil Ismail	1,759	17.02	▼7.86
Total valid votes		10,336	100.00	
Total rejected ballots		292		
Unreturned ballots		0		
Turnout		10,641	78.06	▼0.38
Registered electors		13,631		
Majority		6,818	65.96	▲15.66
BN hold		Swing		

Penang state election, 1990
Party	Candidate	Votes	%	∆%
BN	Ahmad Saad	6,685	75.12	▲5.30
S46	Mohd. Salleh Din	2,214	24.82	▲24.82
Total valid votes		8,899	100.00	
Total rejected ballots		265		
Unreturned ballots		0		
Turnout		9,171	78.44	▲5.91
Registered electors		11,691		
Majority		4,471	50.30	▲11.66
BN hold		Swing		

Penang state election, 1986
Party	Candidate	Votes	%	∆%
BN	Yahaya Jamaluddin	5,467	69.82	▲3.48
PAS	Mazani Abdullah	2,363	31.18	▼3.48
Total valid votes		7,830	100.00	
Total rejected ballots		261		
Unreturned ballots		0		
Turnout		8,091	72.53	▼5.23
Registered electors		11,156		
Majority		3,104	38.64	▲5.96
BN hold		Swing		

Penang state election, 1982
Party	Candidate	Votes	%	∆%
BN	Jusoh @ Yusoff Helmi Shafie	5,604	66.34	▲16.13
PAS	Mohamad Sabu	2,844	33.66	▼10.52
Total valid votes		8,448	100.00	
Total rejected ballots		244		
Unreturned ballots		0		
Turnout		8,692	77.76	▼0.20
Registered electors		11,178		
Majority		2,760	32.68	▲26.65
BN hold		Swing		

Penang state election, 1978
Party	Candidate	Votes	%	∆%
BN	Abdullah Mohamad @ Mahmud	3,488	50.21	▼19.50
PAS	Md. Jamil Hassan	3,069	44.18	▲44.18
Kesatuan Insaf Tanah Air	Jaafar Ahmad	390	5.61	▼8.83
Total valid votes		6,947	100.00	
Total rejected ballots		416		
Unreturned ballots		0		
Turnout		7,363	77.96	▲2.66
Registered electors		9,445		
Majority		419	6.03	▼49.24
BN hold		Swing		

Penang state election, 1974
Party	Candidate	Votes	%
BN	Abdullah Mohamad @ Mahmud	3,997	69.71
Kesatuan Insaf Tanah Air	Tan Thai Kim	828	14.44
Parti Sosialis Rakyat Malaysia	Paharuddin Ibrahim	605	10.55
PEKEMAS	Ismail Helmy	304	5.30
Total valid votes		5,734	100.00
Total rejected ballots		836	
Unreturned ballots		0	
Turnout		6,070	75.30
Registered electors		7,942	
Majority		3,169	55.27
This was a new constituency created.

== See also ==
- Constituencies of Penang
