= Izhar Shah Arif Shah =

Malaysian politician

Yang Berbahagia Tuan Izhar Shah Arif Shah MLA
- إظهار شاه عارف شاه

Member of the Penang State Legislative Assembly for Seberang Jaya
- Incumbent
- Assumed office 12 August 2023
- Preceded by: Afif Bahardin (PH–PKR)
- Majority: 4,926 (2023)

Personal details
- Born: 14 July 1993 (age 32)
- Citizenship: Malaysia
- Party: Malaysian United Indigenous Party (BERSATU)
- Other political affiliations: Perikatan Nasional (PN)
- Parent: Arif Shah Omar Shah (father)
- Occupation: Politician

Yang Berbahagia Tuan Izhar Shah bin Datuk Arif Shah (born 14 July 1993) is a Malaysian politician who served as Member of Penang State Legislative Assembly for Seberang Jaya since August 2023. He is a member of the Malaysian United Indigenous Party (BERSATU), a component party of Perikatan Nasional (PN). He is the son of former Seberang Jaya MLA, Arif Shah Omar Shah.

== Election results ==
Penang State Legislative Assembly
Year	Constituency	Candidate	Votes	Pct	Opponent(s)	Votes	Pct	Ballots cast	Majority	Turnout
2023	N10 Seberang Jaya	Izhar Shah Arif Shah (BERSATU)	20,877	56.69%	Johari Kassim (PKR)	15,951	43.31%	37,054	4,926	75.29%
