= Permatang Pauh =

- Suburb of Seberang Perai
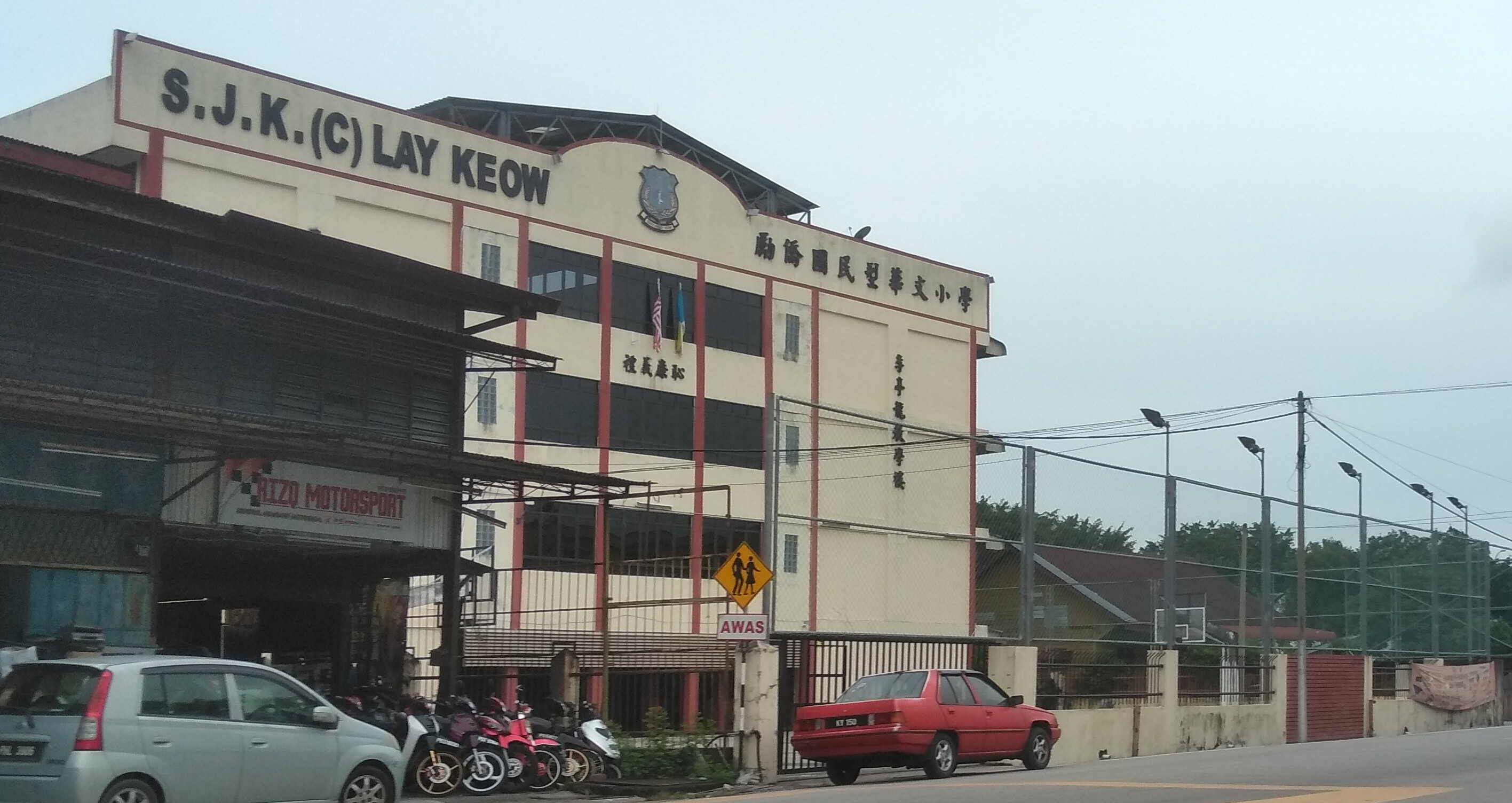
- SJK (C) Lay Keow

- Location within Seberang Perai in Penang
- Coordinates: 5°24′0″N 100°24′0″E
- Country: Malaysia
- State: Penang
- City: Seberang Perai
- District: Central Seberang Perai

Area
  - Total: 8.3 km^{2} (3.2 sq mi)

Population (2020)
  - Total: 5,557
  - Density: 670/km^{2} (1,700/sq mi)

Demographics
  - Ethnic groups: 63.0% Bumiputera; 62.9% Malay; 0.1% indigenous groups from Sabah and Sarawak; 34.4% Chinese; 1.1% Indian; 0.1% Other ethnicities; 1.5% Non-citizens
- Time zone: UTC+8 (MST)
  - Summer (DST): Not observed
- Postal code: 135xx

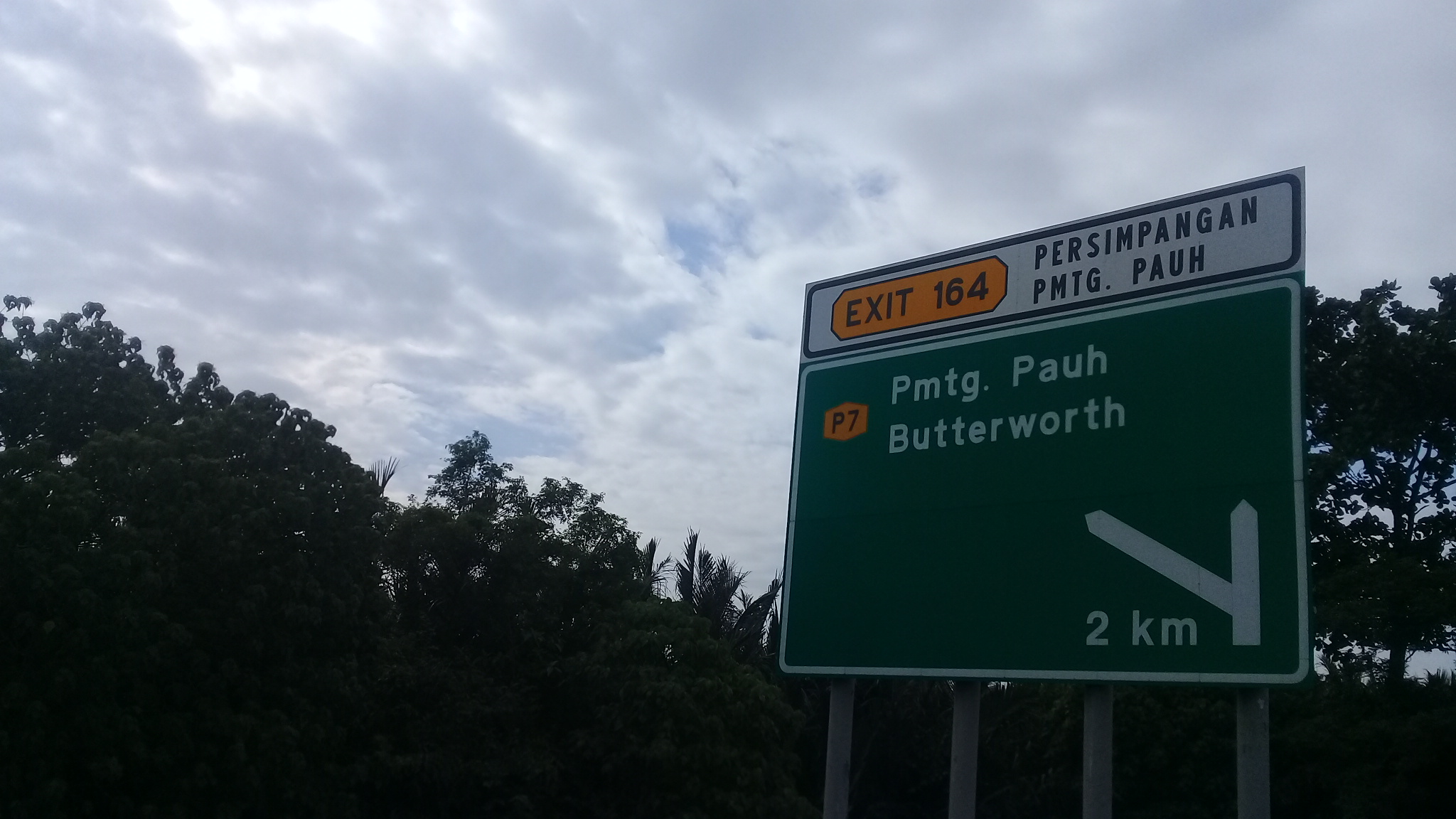
Permatang Pauh Interchange

Permatang Pauh is a suburb of Seberang Perai in the Malaysian state of Penang. There are two institutions of higher learning located in Permatang Pauh, namely a campus of Universiti Teknologi MARA (UiTM) and Politeknik Seberang Perai at Bandar Perda.

Permatang Pauh is beside the longest expressway in Malaysia, in Penang. It is located in the centre of Penang state, in the middle of the Bukit Mertajam and Kepala Batas. The Permatang Pauh highway is a flyover highway and a diamond shaped interchange.

The trunk road to Ipoh and Bukit Mertajam is also found here. It is located 160 kilometres from Ipoh and 10 kilometres from Bukit Mertajam, while with the expressway, it is 335 kilometres from Kuala Lumpur and 90 kilometres to Alor Star. People drive onto the Seberang Jaya highway flyover to go down to the capital after coming out of Permatang Pauh Interchange.

== Geography ==
Map of Permatang Pauh.
Click link at the top right corner to zoom in.
1 Samagagah Market
2 Permatang Rambai

== Demographics ==
Ethnicities within Permatang Pauh in 2020
Ethnicities / Nationality	Percentage
Malays	62.9%
Other Bumiputeras	0.1%
Chinese	34.4%
Indians	1.1%
Others	0.1%
Non-Malaysians	1.5%

As of 2020, Mukim 2, the subdivision that contains Permatang Pauh, was home to a population of 5,557. Malays formed nearly 63% of the population, followed by Chinese at 34%.

== Places in Permatang Pauh ==
- Permatang Pasir
- Taman Pauh & Taman Pauh Jaya
- Permatang Janggus
- Kampung Pertama
- Kampung Sama Gagah
