= Bagan Dalam =

Suburb in Seberang Perai, Penang, Malaysia

- Neighbourhood
- Location within Seberang Perai in Penang
- Coordinates: 5°23′0″N 100°22′0″E
- Country: Malaysia
- State: Penang
- City: Seberang Perai
- District: North Seberang Perai
- Time zone: UTC+8 (MST)
  - Summer (DST): Not observed
- Postal code: 12100

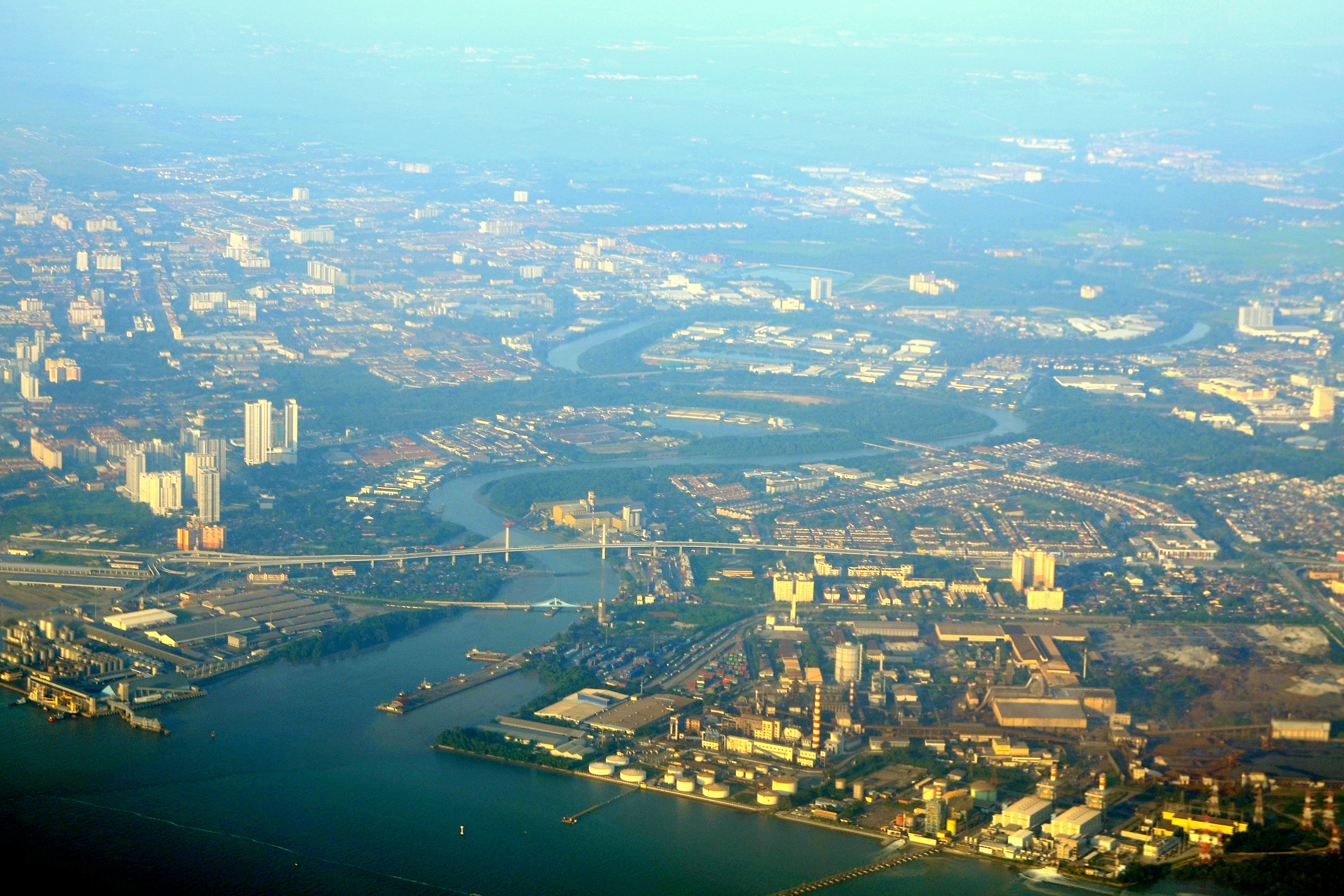
Aerial view of the Perai River estuary with Bagan Dalam (left) and Perai (right)

Bagan Dalam is a residential neighbourhood within the city of Seberang Perai in the Malaysian state of Penang. The place is named after Kampung Bagan Dalam which is a village situated within the core of the same area. Bagan Dalam means "inner jetty" in the Malay language. It is located near the Butterworth Wharves, also known as Dermaga Dalam in the Malay language. Bagan Dalam is connected to Perai, a major industrial area in the Seberang Perai region over the Perai River by the Prai River Bridge and the older Tunku Abdul Rahman Bridge.

== Transportation ==
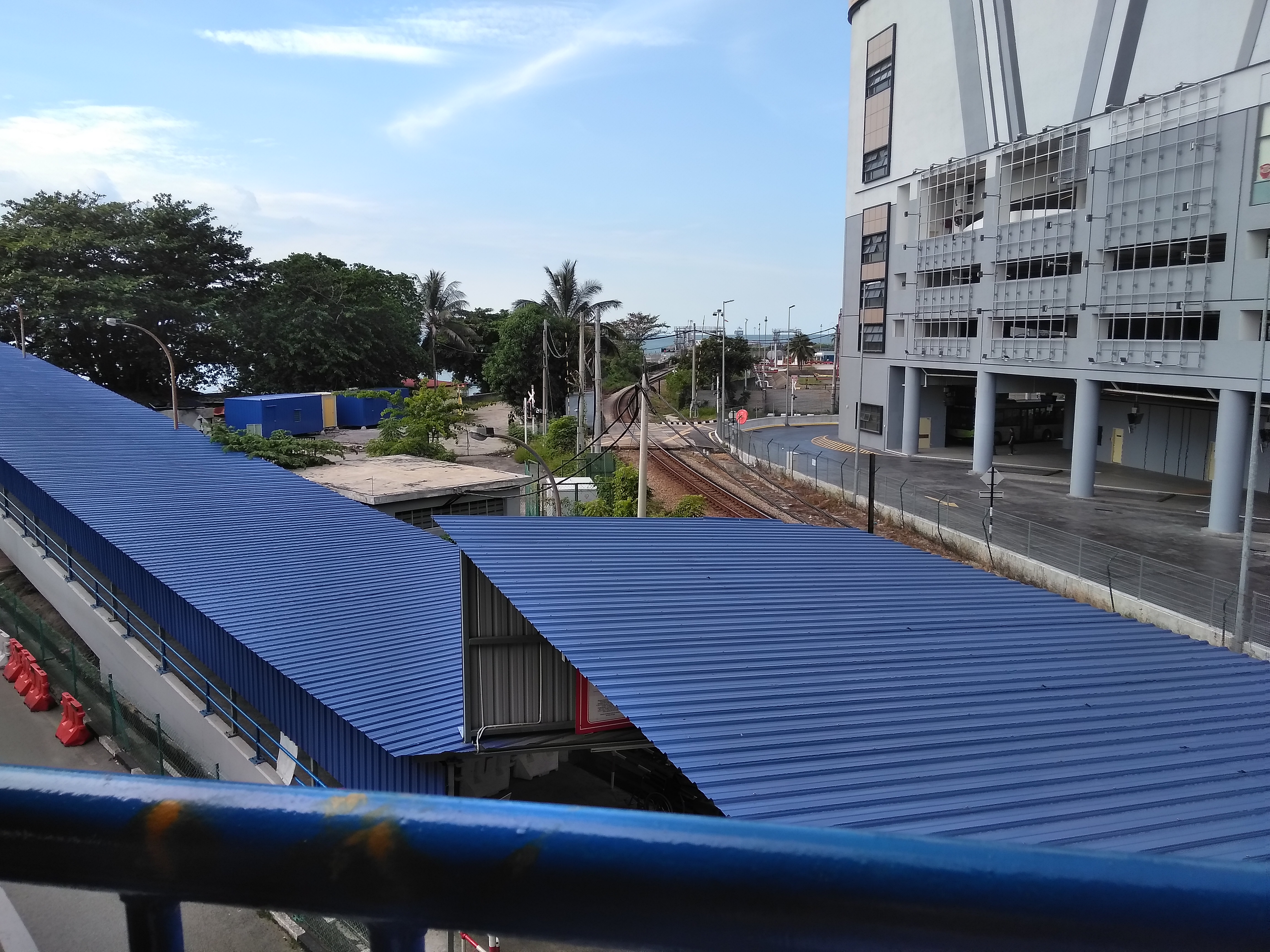
The KTM track and Penang Sentral station beside, looking from the pedestrian linkway to ferry terminal.

Bagan Dalam has major transportation hubs in Butterworth, Penang (Seberang Perai at a larger extent) such as the Penang Sentral which is integrated with Butterworth railway station and the Sultan Abdul Halim Ferry Terminal.

== Demographics ==
According to the voter statistics released by the Election Commission of Malaysia (EC), of the total 18,613 voters, 51% are Chinese, followed by 25% Malay and 24% Indian.

== Religion ==
Among the key religious places of worship located here include

Masjid Jamek Bagan Dalam is the only Mosque in the Bagan Dalam.

Butterworth Mariamman Temple is one of the oldest place of worship in Butterworth.

Gurdwara Butterworth (Sikh temple) was operated from the old building in New Ferry Road, before moving in to new building in Seberang Jaya.

Church of the Nativity of the Blessed Virgin Mary is one of the largest church in Butterworth.

== Education ==
=== Primary schools ===
- SK Kuala Perai
- SK Assumption
- SK Convent, Butterworth
- SK Sungai Nyior, Butterworth
- SK St Mark, Butterworth
- SJK (C) Chung Hwa 2

=== Secondary school ===
- SMK Convent Butterworth

== See also ==
- Bagan Ajam
- Bagan Jermal
- Bagan Luar
- Butterworth, Penang
