= Bagan Luar =

- Neighbourhood of Seberang Perai
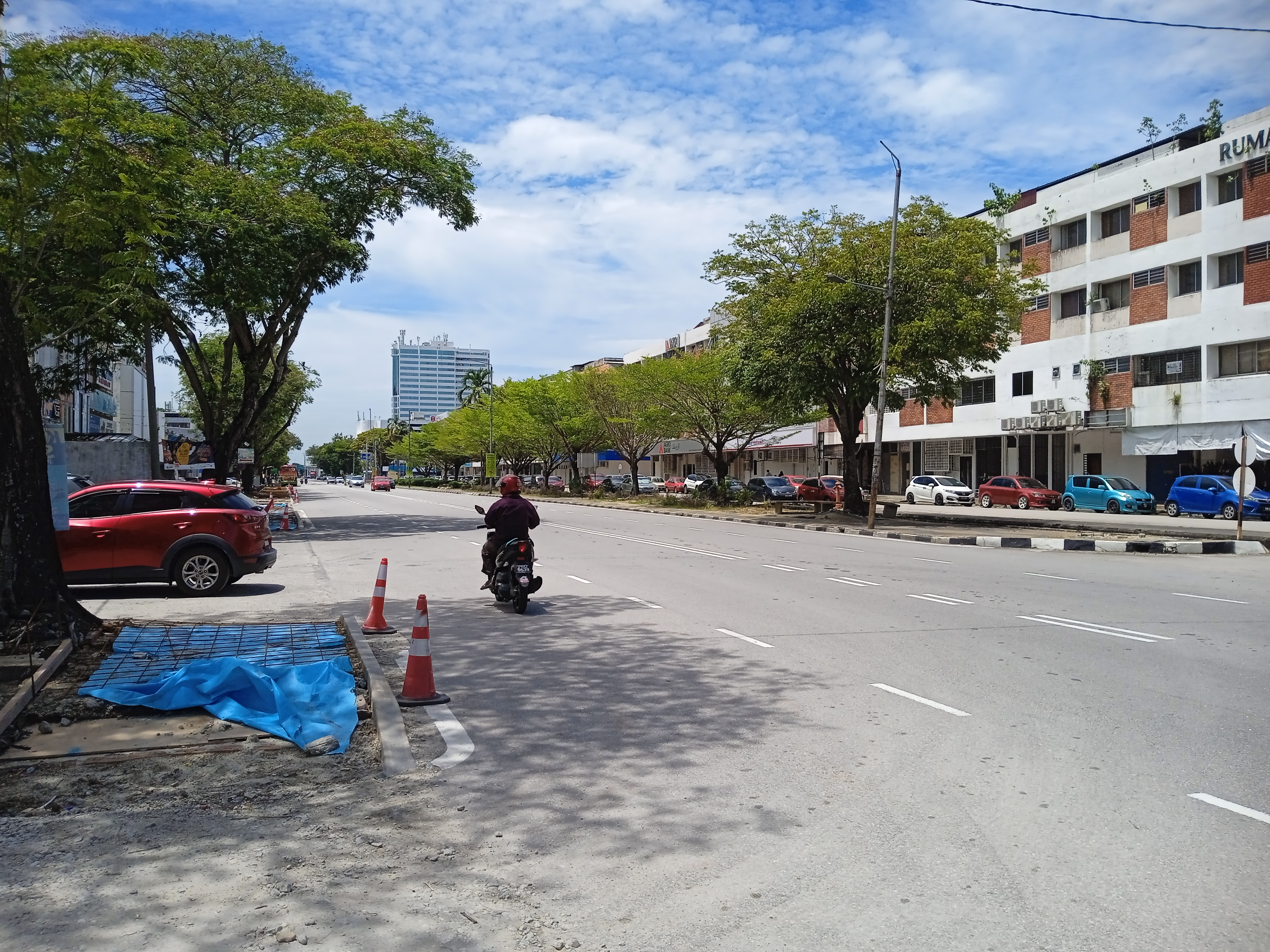

- Location within Seberang Perai in Penang
- Coordinates: 5°24′0″N 100°22′0″E
- Country: Malaysia
- State: Penang
- City: Seberang Perai
- District: North Seberang Perai
- Time zone: UTC+8 (MST)
  - Summer (DST): Not observed
- Postal code: 12000

Bagan Luar is an area of the town of Butterworth, Penang, Malaysia, between Bagan Jermal to the north and Bagan Dalam to the south. It is named after Kampung Bagan Luar, a former village in the area. Jalan Bagan Luar, or Bagan Luar Road, is a major road that runs through the centre of the area. The area is bordered by Butterworth Outer Ring Road (BORR) to the west, Jalan Telaga Air to the north, Jalan Chain Ferry to the south and Jalan Siram and Jalan Sungai Nyior to the east. Kampung Benggali and Kampung Jawa are villages in the area.

Notable landmarks include Dewan Haji Ahmad Badawi, Padang MPSP (Dataran Pemuda Merdeka), St. Mark's Church, Maha Mariamman Devasthanam Temple, Tian Gong Tan Temple, Seberang Perai Majistrate's Court, the Penang Dental College at NB Tower and the former headquarters of the Seberang Perai Municipal Council (MPSP).

== See also ==
- Butterworth, Penang
- Bagan Dalam
- Bagan Jermal, Butterworth
- Bagan Ajam
