= Kepala Batas, Seberang Perai =

Kepala Batas
- Suburb of Seberang Perai and district capital
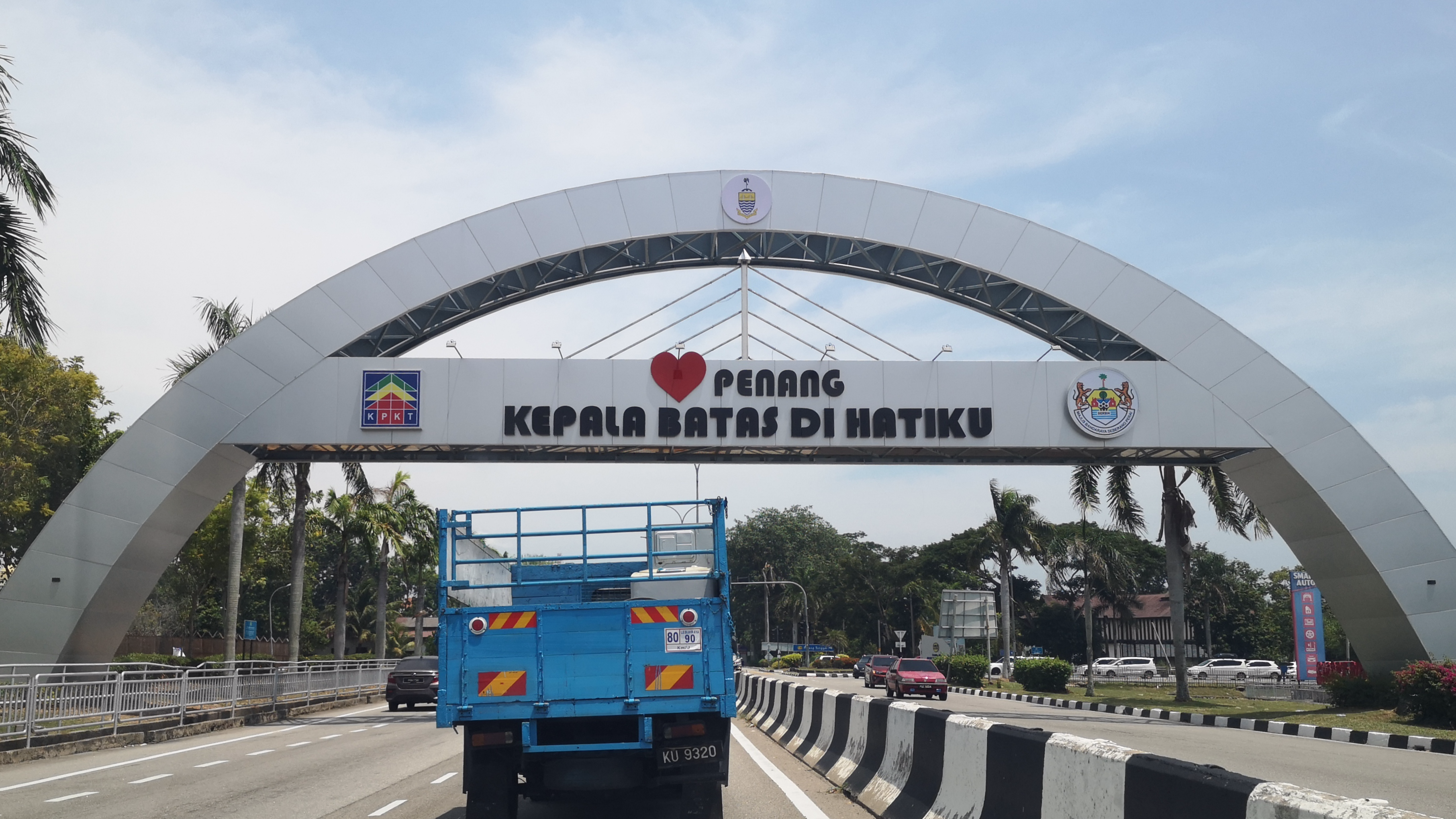
- Interactive map of Kepala Batas
- Location within Seberang Perai in Penang
- Coordinates: 5°31′0″N 100°25′0″E
- Country: Malaysia
- State: Penang
- City: Seberang Perai
- District: North Seberang Perai

Area
  - Total: 0.2 km^{2} (0.077 sq mi)

Population (2020)
  - Total: 361
  - Density: 1,800/km^{2} (4,700/sq mi)

Demographics
  - Ethnic groups: 36.3% Chinese; 35.7% Bumiputera; 35.7% Malay; 27.7% Indian; 0.3% Non-citizens
- Time zone: UTC+8 (MST)
  - Summer (DST): Not observed
- Postal code: 13200

Kepala Batas (UK: /ˌkəpɑːlɑː bɑːtɑːs/, Malay: [kəpala batas]) is a suburb of Seberang Perai and the seat of the Northern Seberang Perai District in the Malaysian state of Penang. It lies about 10 km (6.2 mi) northeast of Butterworth and 15km (9.3 mi) southwest of Sungai Petani.

== Etymology ==
Kepala Batas means "front end of the paddy field" in Malay; Kepala is the top or front end of something, and Batas is the earthern dykes bordering a paddy field.

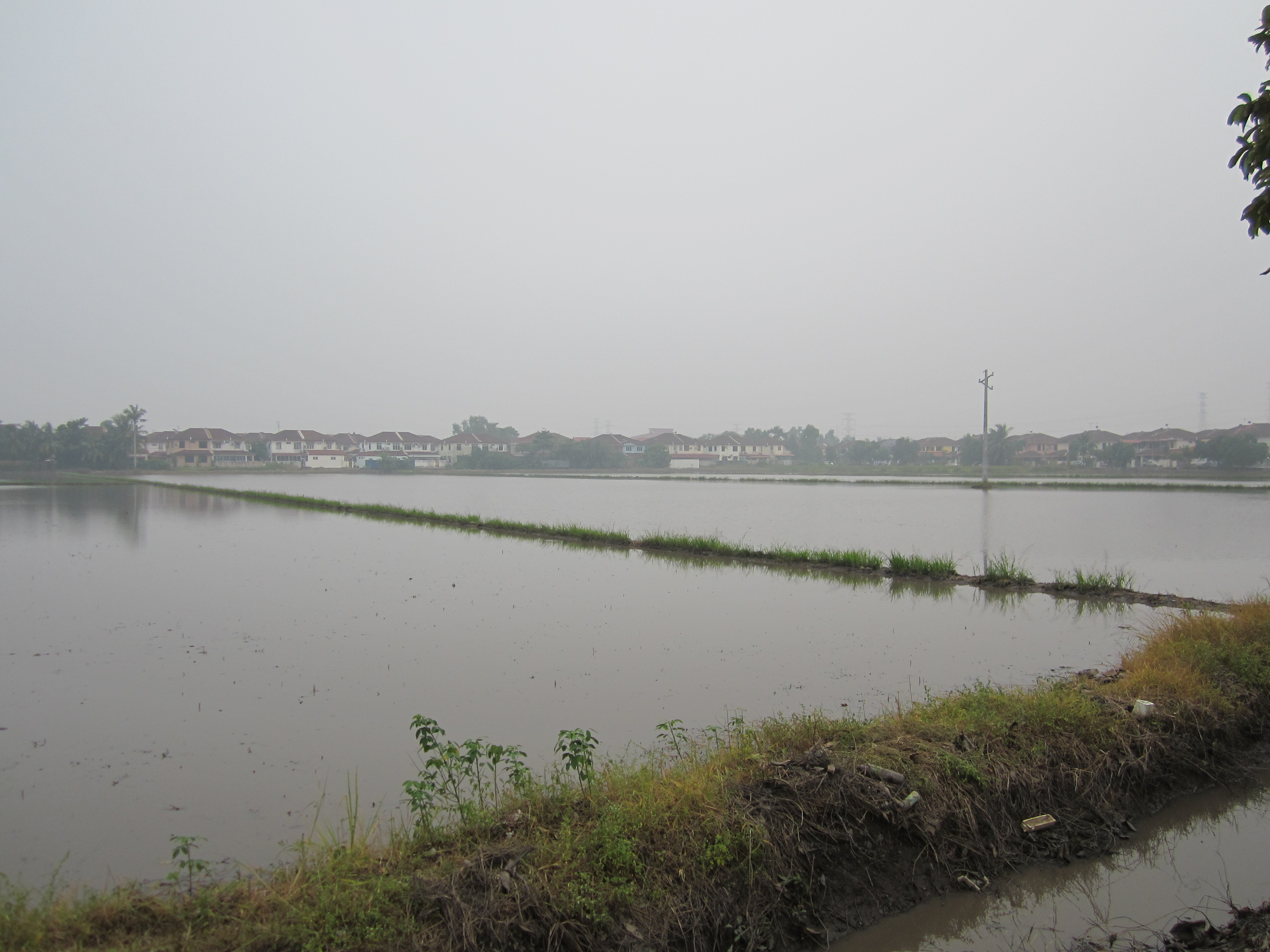
Dykes in a Malaysian paddy field.

Kepala Batas is mostly a muddy region, where paddy cultivation became a major agricultural activity for its residents. The abundance of paddy fields in the area thus gave rise to the place's name.

== Geography ==
Map of Kepala Batas.
Click link at the top right corner to zoom in.

== Demographics ==
Ethnicities within Kepala Batas in 2020
Ethnicities / Nationality	Percentage
Chinese	36.3%
Malays	35.7%
Indians	27.7%
Non-Malaysians	0.3%

As of 2020, Kepala Batas had a population of 361. Chinese and Malays each formed about 36% of the population, followed by Indians at 27%.

== Transport ==
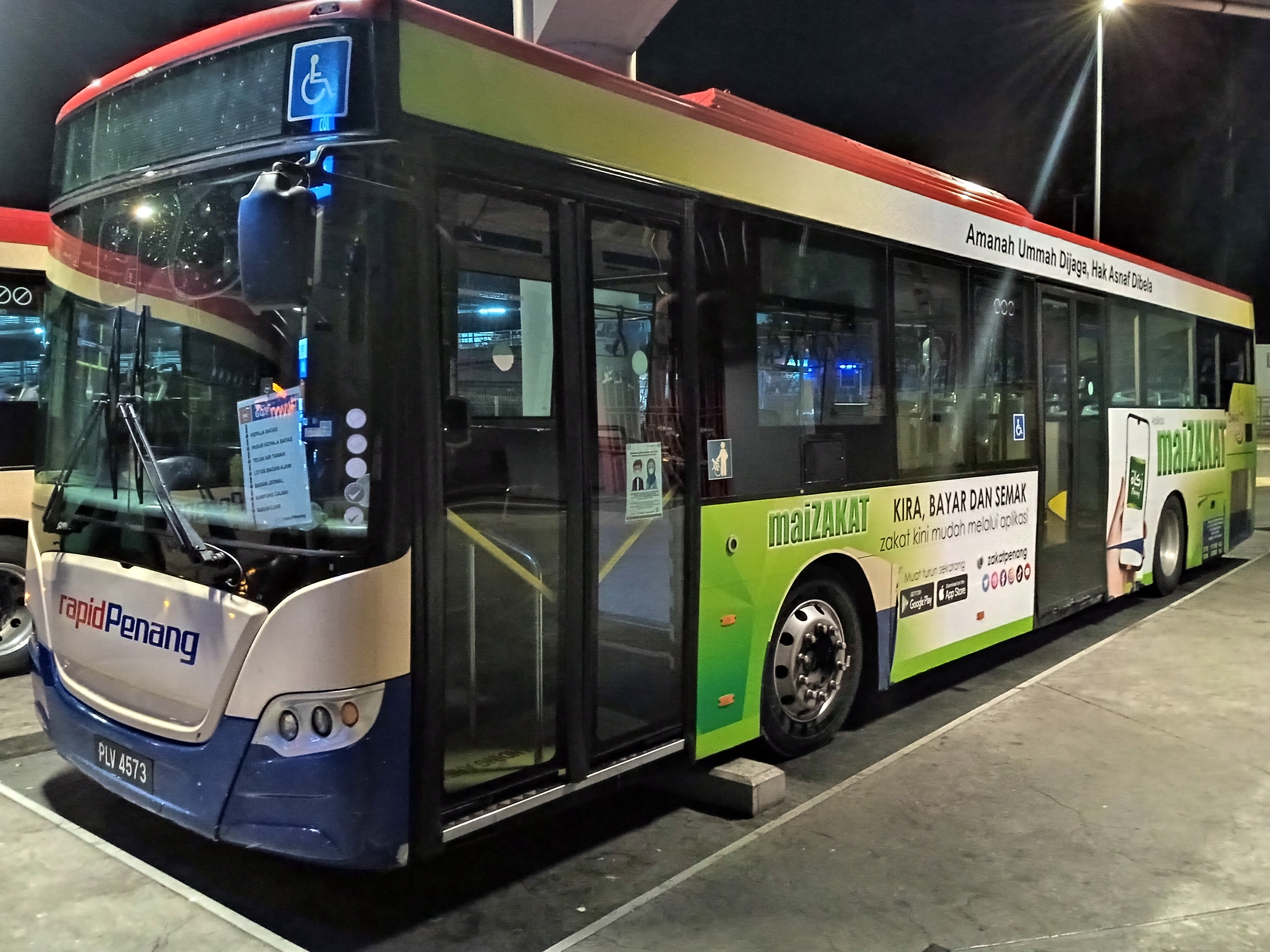
Rapid Penang bus route 601 at Penang Sentral

The area is accessible by Rapid Penang bus route 601 (Penang Sentral Bus Terminal–Kepala Batas).

== In popular culture ==
- A British plantation bungalow in Kepala Batas, the Bertam House, was featured in A House Of its Time, a documentary series created by Freestate Productions and broadcast by Mediacorp.

== Notable people ==
- Abdullah bin Haji Ahmad Badawi, 5th Prime Minister of Malaysia (31 October 2003 – 3 April 2009).
- Abdul Rahman Abbas, 7th Yang di-Pertua Negeri of the state of Penang, Malaysia (2001–2021).
- Nor Mohamed Yakcop, former Malaysian Minister in the Prime Minister's Department and Minister of Finance II.
- Reezal Merican bin Naina Merican, Deputy Minister of Foreign Affairs (29 July 2015 - 9 May 2018), Minister of Youth and Sports (10 March 2020 - 16 August 2021), Minister of Housing and Local Government (30 August 2021 - 24 November 2022), Member of the Parliament of Malaysia for the seat of Kepala Batas (2013-2022) in the state of Penang and Member of the Penang State Legislative Assembly for the seat of Bertam (since 2023).
