= Bagan Jermal, Butterworth =

Bagan Jermal
- Neighbourhood
- Location within Seberang Perai in Penang
- Coordinates: 5°32′0″N 100°22′0″E
- Country: Malaysia
- State: Penang
- City: Seberang Perai
- District: North Seberang Perai
- Time zone: UTC+8 (MST)
  - Summer (DST): Not observed
- Postal code: 12300

Bagan Jermal is a residential neighbourhood within the city of Seberang Perai in the Malaysian state of Penang. It is located just north of Bagan Luar, south of Bagan Ajam and west of Jalan Raja Uda. The place is named after Kampung Bagan Jermal, a village which is located within the same area. The state seat of Bagan is located within the Parliament seat of Bagan. Other villages located nearby include Kampung Kubang Buaya, Kampung Paya, Kampung Gajah and Kampung Kastam. Notable buildings located here include the Butterworth Majistrate's Court and the Tenaga Nasional Quarters. Schools that are located here are SJK(C) Chung Hwa Pusat, SMK Kampung Kastam, SK Bagan Tuan Kechil and SK Bagan Jermal.

== Demographics ==
According to the statistics provided by the Election Commission of Malaysia (EC), the state seat of Bagan Jermal has a total number of 24,608 voters, which consists of 68% Chinese, 17% Malay and 15% Indian.

== Penang ==
Another Bagan Jermal area is in Penang. The Penang Chinese Girls High School and Phor Tay Institution are also located in Jalan Bagan Jermal, Penang. There are also a special school called St. Nicholas located in Bagan Jermal. Secondly, there are several luxury condominiums can be seen there. The Super Condo of Penang is completed near Bagan Jermal, Penang. The Gurney Plaza and the newly opened Gurney Paragon also situated near Bagan Jermal, Penang Island.

Bagan Jermal is very near to tourist attractions in Penang. For example, the Botanical Garden, Batu Feringgi beach and the slept monk is situated near Jalan Bagan Jermal only. In the middle of Jalan Bagan Jermal, there are also plenty of the floor restaurants for the students there. Another places are in Bandar Baru Air Itam and Tun Dr Lim Chong Eu expressway near Tesco Glugor.

== See also ==
- Butterworth, Penang
- Bagan Dalam
- Bagan Luar
- Bagan Ajam
