= Kepala Batas (federal constituency) =

Federal constituency of Penang, Malaysia

Kepala Batas (P041)
Penang constituency

Federal constituency
- Legislature: Dewan Rakyat
- MP: Siti Mastura Mohamad; PN
- Constituency created: 1974
- First contested: 1974
- Last contested: 2022

Demographics
- Population (2020): 117,043
- Electors (2023): 84,190
- Area (km²): 138
- Pop. density (per km²): 848.1

Kepala Batas is a federal constituency in North Seberang Perai District, Penang, Malaysia, that has been represented in the Dewan Rakyat since 1974.

The federal constituency was created in the 1974 redistribution and is mandated to return a single member to the Dewan Rakyat under the first past the post voting system.

== Demographics ==
https://live.chinapress.com.my/ge15/parliament/PENANG

Ethnic breakdown of Kepala Batas's electorate as of 2022
1. Malay (87.2%)
2. Chinese (9.00%)
3. Indian (3.60%)
4. Other ethnicities (0.20%)

As 2020, Kepala Batas has a population of 117,043 people.

Age breakdown of Kepala Batas's electorate as of 2022
1. 18-20 (7.50%)
2. 21-29 (23.3%)
3. 30-39 (20.5%)
4. 40-49 (17.4%)
5. 50-59 (14.9%)
6. 60-69 (9.63%)
7. 70-79 (5.00%)
8. 80-89 (1.49%)
9. above 90 (0.20%)
Gender breakdown of Kepala Batas's electorate as of 2022
1. Male (49.4%)
2. Female (50.6%)

== History ==
=== Polling districts ===
According to the federal gazette issued on 18 July 2023, the Kepala Batas constituency is divided into 29 polling districts.

State constituency	Polling districts	Code	Location
Penaga (N01)	Kuala Muda	041/01/01	SK Kuala Muda
Penaga (N01)	Pulau Mertajam	041/01/02	SK Pulau Mertajam
Penaga (N01)	Pasir Gebu	041/01/03	SK Pasir Gebu
Penaga (N01)	Penaga	041/01/04	SK Penaga; SK Penaga Jaya
Penaga (N01)	Kota Aur	041/01/05	SMK Dato' Haji Hassan Noh
Penaga (N01)	Permatang Janggus	041/01/06	SK Permatang Janggus
Penaga (N01)	Guar Kepah	041/01/07	Pusat Penempatan Banjir Pengkalan Bongor
Penaga (N01)	Permatang Tiga Ringgit	041/01/08	SK Lahar Kepar
Penaga (N01)	Lahar Kepar	041/01/09	SK Lahar Kepar
Bertam (N02)	Padang Benggali	041/02/01	SA Rakyat Al-Falah Padang Benggali
Bertam (N02)	Permatang Berah	041/02/02	SJK (C) Aik Keow
Bertam (N02)	Permatang Rambai	041/02/03	SA Rakyat Maahad Al-Huda
Bertam (N02)	Permatang Sintok	041/02/04	SK Permatang Sintok
Bertam (N02)	Permatang Pak Elong	041/03/05	SJK (C) Sin Chung
Bertam (N02)	Permatang Bertam	041/02/06	SK Permatang Bertam
Bertam (N02)	Kepala Batas	041/02/07	SK Hashim Awang
Bertam (N02)	Jalan Kedah	041/02/08	SJK (C) Pei Yu
Bertam (N02)	Pongsu Seribu	041/02/09	SMK Kepala Batas; SMK Datuk Haji Ahmad Badawi
Pinang Tunggal (N03)	Bumbung Lima	041/03/01	SK Bumbong Lima
Pinang Tunggal (N03)	Paya Keladi	041/03/02	SMK Bertam Perdana; SK Paya Keladi
Pinang Tunggal (N03)	Bertam Indah	041/03/03	SMK Bertam Indah
Pinang Tunggal (N03)	Ladang Malakoff	041/03/04	SJK (T) Ladang Malakoff
Pinang Tunggal (N03)	Kampong To'Bedu	041/03/05	SK Kampong To' Bedor
Pinang Tunggal (N03)	Permatang Langsat	041/03/06	SMK Dato' Kailan
Pinang Tunggal (N03)	Pinang Tunggal	041/03/07	SK Pinang Tunggal
Pinang Tunggal (N03)	Kampong Baharu	041/03/08	SK Mohd Shah
Pinang Tunggal (N03)	Kampong Selamat Utara	041/03/09	SJK (C) Mah Hua
Pinang Tunggal (N03)	Kubang Menerong	041/03/10	Madrasah Al-Yatumiah Al-Islamiah Kubang Menerong
Pinang Tunggal (N03)	Kampong Selamat Selatan	041/03/11	SK Kampung Selamat

=== Representation history ===
Members of Parliament for Kepala Batas
Parliament	No	Years	Member	Party	Vote Share
Constituency created, renamed from Seberang Utara
4th	P035	1974–1978	Mohamed Sopiee Sheikh Ibrahim (محمد شڤيعي شيخ إبراهيم)	BN (UMNO)	Uncontested
5th	P035	1978–1982	Abdullah Ahmad Badawi (عبدالله أحمد بدوي)	BN (UMNO)	12,645; 62.41%
6th	P035	1982–1986	Abdullah Ahmad Badawi (عبدالله أحمد بدوي)	BN (UMNO)	16,659; 68.51%
7th	P038	1986–1990	Abdullah Ahmad Badawi (عبدالله أحمد بدوي)	BN (UMNO)	15,463; 69.33%
8th	P038	1990–1995	Abdullah Ahmad Badawi (عبدالله أحمد بدوي)	BN (UMNO)	17,025; 70.35%
9th	P041	1995–1999	Abdullah Ahmad Badawi (عبدالله أحمد بدوي)	BN (UMNO)	22,521; 82.77%
10th	P041	1999–2004	Abdullah Ahmad Badawi (عبدالله أحمد بدوي)	BN (UMNO)	19,985; 69.40%
11th	P041	2004–2008	Abdullah Ahmad Badawi (عبدالله أحمد بدوي)	BN (UMNO)	25,403; 77.72%
12th	P041	2008–2013	Abdullah Ahmad Badawi (عبدالله أحمد بدوي)	BN (UMNO)	23,445; 65.78%
13th	P041	2013–2018	Reezal Merican Naina Merican (ريزال ماريکان ناينا ماريکان)	BN (UMNO)	25,128; 54.53%
14th	P041	2018–2022	Reezal Merican Naina Merican (ريزال ماريکان ناينا ماريکان)	BN (UMNO)	22,459; 42.94%
15th	P041	2022–present	Siti Mastura Muhammad (سيتي مستورة محمّد)	PN (PAS)	28,604; 41.27%

=== State constituency ===
Parliamentary constituency	State constituency						
Parliamentary constituency	1955–1959*	1959–1974	1974–1986	1986–1995	1995–2004	2004–2018	2018–present
Kepala Batas			Bertam				
Kepala Batas			Penaga				
Kepala Batas				Pinang Tunggal			
Kepala Batas			Tasek Gelugor				

=== Historical boundaries ===
State Constituency	State constituency				
State Constituency	1974	1984	1994	2003	2018
Bertam	Bumbung Lima; Kepala Batas; Lahar Kepar; Paya Keladi; Permatang Sintok	Bertam; Bumbung Lima; Kepala Batas; Paya Keladi; Permatang Sintok	Bertam; Kepala Batas; Permatang Rambai; Permatang Sintok; Taman Sepakat		
Penaga	Kuala Muda; Pasir Gebu; Permatang Janggus; Permatang Sintok; Penanga	Kuala Muda; Lahar Kepar; Pasir Gebu; Permatang Janggus; Penanga			
Pinang Tunggal		Kampung Selamat; Kubang Menerong; Permatang Berangan; Permatang Langsat; Pinang Tunggal	Bumbung Lima; Kampung Selamat; Kubang Menerong; Permatang Langsat; Pinang Tunggal		
Tasek Gelugor	Kampung Selamat; Kubang Menerong; Permatang Berangan; Permatang Langsat; Tasek Gelugor				

=== Current state assembly members ===
No.	State Constituency	Member	Coalition (Party)
N01	Penaga	Mohd Yusni Mat Piah	PN (PAS)
N02	Bertam	Reezal Merican Naina Merican	BN (UMNO)
N03	Pinang Tunggal	Bukhori Ghazali	PN (PAS)

=== Local governments & postcodes ===
No.	State Constituency	Local Government	Postcode
N01	Penaga	Seberang Perai City Council	13100, 13110 Penaga; 13200, 13210 Kepala Batas; 13300 Tasek Gelugor
N02	Bertam	Seberang Perai City Council	13100, 13110 Penaga; 13200, 13210 Kepala Batas; 13300 Tasek Gelugor
N03	Pinang Tunggal	Seberang Perai City Council	13100, 13110 Penaga; 13200, 13210 Kepala Batas; 13300 Tasek Gelugor

== Election results ==
Malaysian general election, 2022
Party	Candidate	Votes	%	∆%
PN	Siti Mastura Muhammad	28,604	41.27	▲41.27
BN	Reezal Merican Naina Merican	25,737	37.14	▼5.80
MUDA	Muhammad Danial Abdul Majeed	14,214	20.51	▲20.51
PEJUANG	Hamidi Abu Hassan	747	1.08	▲1.08
Total valid votes		69,302	100.00	
Total rejected ballots		714		
Unreturned ballots		134		
Turnout		70,150	83.41	▼4.37
Registered electors		83,081		
Majority		2,867	4.13	▼4.92
PN gain from BN		Swing		?
Source(s) https://lom.agc.gov.my/ilims/upload/portal/akta/outputp/1753273/PUB609%20(2022).pdf

Malaysian general election, 2018
Party	Candidate	Votes	%	∆%
BN	Reezal Merican Naina Merican	22,459	42.94	▼11.59
PKR	Zaidi Zakaria	17,723	33.89	▲33.89
PAS	Siti Mastura Muhammad	12,120	23.17	▼22.30
Total valid votes		52,302	100.00	
Total rejected ballots		715		
Unreturned ballots		110		
Turnout		53,127	87.78	▼2.74
Registered electors		60,523		
Majority		4,736	9.05	▼0.01
BN hold		Swing		
Source(s) "His Majesty's Government Gazette - Notice of Contested Election, Parliament for the State of Penang [P.U. (B) 236/2018]" (PDF). Attorney General's Chambers of Malaysia. 3 May 2018. "Federal Government Gazette - Results of Contested Election and Statements of the Poll after the Official Addition of Votes, Parliamentary Constituencies for the State of Penang [P.U. (B) 310/2018]" (PDF). Attorney General's Chambers of Malaysia. 28 May 2018.

Malaysian general election, 2013
Party	Candidate	Votes	%	∆%
BN	Reezal Merican Naina Merican	25,128	54.53	▼11.25
PAS	Afnan Hamimi Taib Azamudden	20,952	45.47	▲11.25
Total valid votes		46,080	100.00	
Total rejected ballots		585		
Unreturned ballots		75		
Turnout		46,740	90.52	▲6.07
Registered electors		51,635		
Majority		4,176	9.06	▼22.50
BN hold		Swing		
Source(s) "Federal Government Gazette - Notice of Contested Election, Parliament for the State of Penang [P.U. (B) 173/2013]" (PDF). Attorney General's Chambers of Malaysia. 26 April 2013. "Federal Government Gazette - Results of Contested Election and Statements of the Poll after the Official Addition of Votes, Parliamentary Constituencies for the State of Penang [P.U. (B) 214/2013]" (PDF). Attorney General's Chambers of Malaysia. 22 May 2013. Archived from the original (PDF) on 2019-03-22.

Malaysian general election, 2008
Party	Candidate	Votes	%	∆%
BN	Abdullah Ahmad Badawi	23,445	65.78	▼11.94
PAS	Subri Md. Arshad	12,199	34.22	▲11.94
Total valid votes		35,644	100.00	
Total rejected ballots		634		
Unreturned ballots		50		
Turnout		36,328	84.45	▲0.26
Registered electors		43,019		
Majority		11,246	31.56	▼23.88
BN hold		Swing		

Malaysian general election, 2004
Party	Candidate	Votes	%	∆%
BN	Abdullah Ahmad Badawi	25,403	77.72	▲8.32
PAS	Abd Khalid Rasid	7,281	22.28	▼8.32
Total valid votes		32,684	100.00	
Total rejected ballots		672		
Unreturned ballots		0		
Turnout		33,356	84.19	▲2.80
Registered electors		39,619		
Majority		18,122	55.44	▲16.64
BN hold		Swing		

Malaysian general election, 1999
Party	Candidate	Votes	%	∆%
BN	Abdullah Ahmad Badawi	19,985	69.40	▼13.77
PAS	Abd Khalid Rasid	8,810	30.60	▲30.60
Total valid votes		28,795	100.00	
Total rejected ballots		618		
Unreturned ballots		64		
Turnout		29,477	81.39	▲2.92
Registered electors		36,180		
Majority		11,175	38.80	▼26.74
BN hold		Swing		

Malaysian general election, 1995
Party	Candidate	Votes	%	∆%
BN	Abdullah Ahmad Badawi	22,521	82.77	▲12.42
S46	Naser Mohd. Razi	4,687	17.23	▼12.42
Total valid votes		27,208	100.00	
Total rejected ballots		1,093		
Unreturned ballots		31		
Turnout		28,332	78.47	▼1.78
Registered electors		36,105		
Majority		17,834	65.54	▲24.84
BN hold		Swing		

Malaysian general election, 1990
Party	Candidate	Votes	%	∆%
BN	Abdullah Ahmad Badawi	17,025	70.35	▲1.02
S46	Ahmad Awang	7,174	29.65	▲29.65
Total valid votes		24,199	100.00	
Total rejected ballots		732		
Unreturned ballots		0		
Turnout		24,931	80.25	▲4.44
Registered electors		31,068		
Majority		9,851	40.70	▲2.04
BN hold		Swing		

Malaysian general election, 1986
Party	Candidate	Votes	%	∆%
BN	Abdullah Ahmad Badawi	15,463	69.33	▲0.82
PAS	Ahmad Hasan Salahuddin	6,841	30.67	▲13.85
Total valid votes		22,304	100.00	
Total rejected ballots		596		
Unreturned ballots		0		
Turnout		22,900	75.81	▼4.48
Registered electors		30,209		
Majority		8,622	38.66	▼13.03
BN hold		Swing		

Malaysian general election, 1982
Party	Candidate	Votes	%	∆%
BN	Abdullah Ahmad Badawi	16,759	68.51	▲6.10
PAS	Mohamad Sabu	4,115	16.82	▼20.77
DAP	Khoo Soo Hoe	3,589	14.67	▲14.67
Total valid votes		24,463	100.00	
Total rejected ballots		814		
Unreturned ballots		0		
Turnout		25,277	80.29	▼1.52
Registered electors		31,481		
Majority		12,644	51.69	▲26.87
BN hold		Swing		

Malaysian general election, 1978
Party	Candidate	Votes	%	∆%
BN	Abdullah Ahmad Badawi	12,645	62.41	
PAS	Musa Mohd. Yatim	7,616	37.59	
Total valid votes		20,261	100.00	
Total rejected ballots		1,230		
Unreturned ballots		0		
Turnout		21,491	81.81	
Registered electors		26,269		
Majority		5,029	24.82	
BN hold		Swing		

Malaysian general election, 1974
Party	Candidate	Votes	%	∆%
On the nomination day, Mohamed Sopiee Sheikh Ibrahim won uncontested.
BN	Mohamed Sopiee Sheikh Ibrahim			
Total valid votes			100.00	
Total rejected ballots				
Unreturned ballots				
Turnout				
Registered electors		22,843		
Majority				
This was a new constituency created.
