= Butterworth, Seberang Perai =

City centre of Seberang Perai in Penang, Malaysia

Butterworth Bagan
- City centre of Seberang Perai
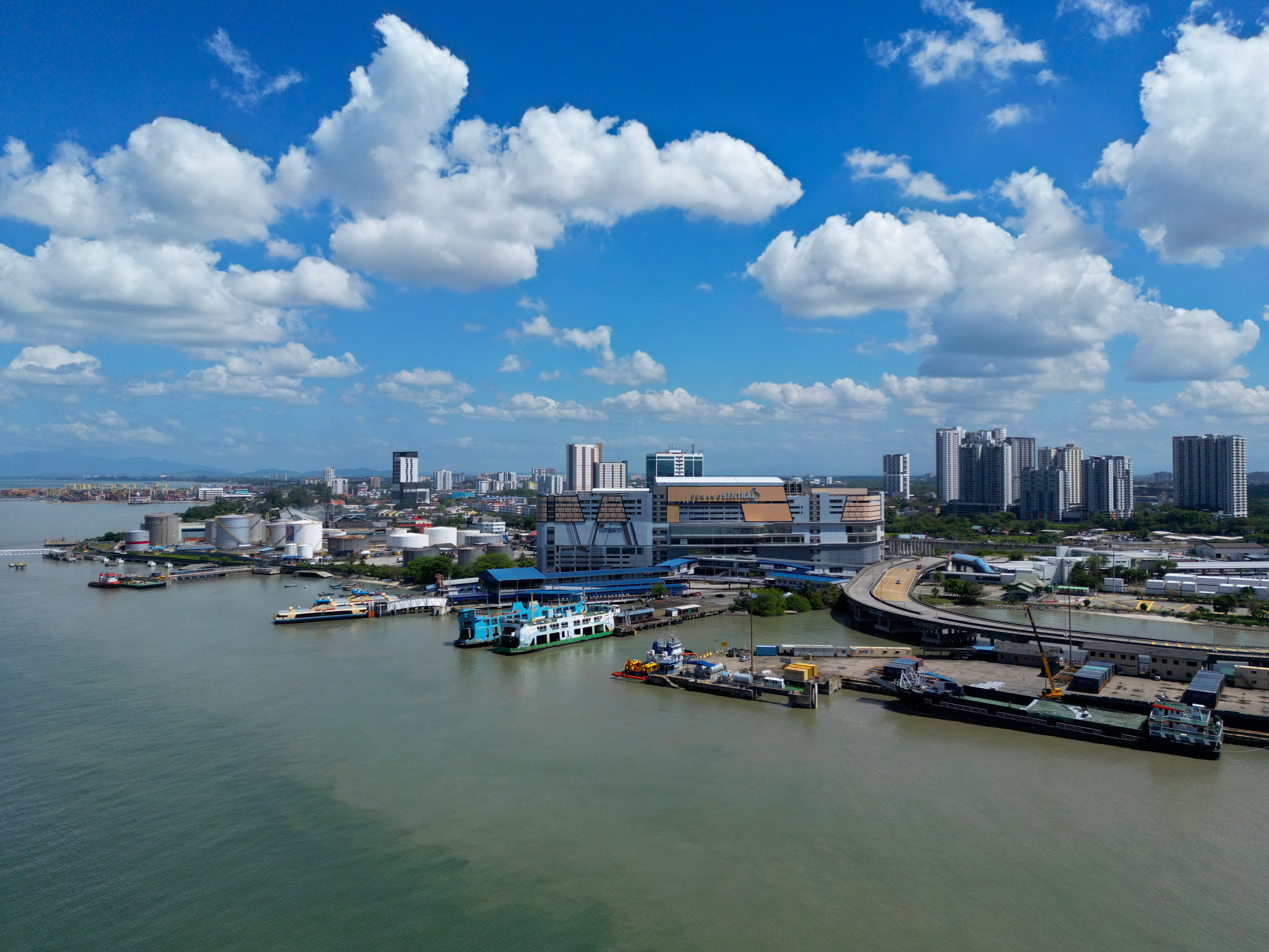
- Etymology: William John Butterworth
- Interactive map of Butterworth
- Location within Seberang Perai in Penang
- Coordinates: 5°23′39″N 100°21′59″E
- Country: Malaysia
- State: Penang
- City: Seberang Perai
- District: North Seberang Perai

Area
  - Total: 14.6 km^{2} (5.6 sq mi)

Population (2020)
  - Total: 80,378
  - Density: 5,510/km^{2} (14,300/sq mi)

Demographics
  - Ethnic groups: 51.6% Chinese; 24.3% Bumiputera; 24.1% Malay; 0.3% indigenous groups from Sabah and Sarawak; 14.1% Indian; 0.5% Other ethnicities; 9.5% Non-citizens
- Time zone: UTC+8 (MST)
  - Summer (DST): Not observed
- Postal code: 120xx to 134xx

Butterworth is the city centre of Seberang Perai in the Malaysian state of Penang. It lies about 3 km (1.9 mi) east of George Town, the capital city of Penang, across the Penang Strait. As of 2020, Butterworth had a total population of 80,378 residents.

Butterworth was named after William John Butterworth, a former Governor of the Straits Settlements during the mid-19th century. Under the British Raj, the town came into being as a transportation hub, due to its proximity to George Town. While the British East India Company initially obtained Seberang Perai (then named Province Wellesley) for agricultural purposes, Butterworth has also witnessed massive industrialisation during the latter half of the 20th century. In 1974, the Port of Penang was relocated into the town.

A cross-strait ferry service provides a direct link between Butterworth and George Town. The Port of Penang handled 1.52 million TEUs of cargo as of 2017, making it one of the busiest seaports in Malaysia. In addition, the Butterworth railway station, situated adjacent to the town's ferry terminal, is a major Malayan Railway station, with train services operated by both the Malayan Railway and the State Railway of Thailand.

== Etymology ==
The town of Butterworth was named after William John Butterworth, who was the Governor of the Straits Settlements from 1843 to 1855.

== History ==
Historical Affiliations	Period
British East India Company	1831–1857
British Raj	1857–1867
Straits Settlements	1831–1941; 1945–1946
Empire of Japan	1941–1945
Malayan Union	1946–1948
Federation of Malaya	1948–1963
Malaysia	1963–Present

A fishing village named Bagan had existed prior to the acquisition of the area by the British East India Company. The town of Butterworth only came into being in the British Raj and was concurrently named after the then Governor of the Straits Settlements, William John Butterworth.

Butterworth was developed as a mainland counterpart to the bustling entrepôt of George Town on Penang Island, directly across the Penang Strait. During the British Raj, Butterworth grew into a major transportation hub. Passengers and goods were transported across the strait by sampans, and in 1894, the first cross-strait ferry service between Butterworth and George Town was introduced. By 1900, a nascent railway line running the length of British Malaya was extended to Butterworth. These developments allowed tin to be transported more efficiently to Butterworth, which functioned as a transit point whereby the tin would then be shipped to George Town for smelting and export.

As with the rest of Penang, Butterworth was occupied by the Japanese between December 1941 and September 1945. During the early days of the Japanese invasion of Malaya, the Royal Air Force and the Royal Australian Air Force units stationed at RAF Butterworth struggled to counter Japanese air raids over Penang and took heavy casualties. These Allied units had to withdraw southwards by 15 December, while RAF Butterworth was seized by the Imperial Japanese 25th Army on 20 December.

After Malaya's independence in 1957, as part of an effort to advocate import substitution industries in the 1960s, the Alliance-led Penang state government, led by the then Chief Minister Wong Pow Nee, developed Mak Mandin as the first industrial estate in Penang. The Mak Mandin Industrial Estate was founded in 1961. In 1974, the Port of Penang was relocated from George Town to Butterworth, substantially boosting the town's economy.

The Butterworth Town Council had been established in 1953. However, the town council was amalgamated with the Seberang Perai North Rural District Council in 1962. The local governments in Seberang Perai were eventually merged and upgraded into the Seberang Perai Municipal Council in 1976.

Towards the end of the 20th century, Butterworth underwent a period of decline. The town suffered significantly due to administrative decentralisation. The North Seberang Perai District Office, along with the district's police headquarters and a government-run hospital, was moved out of the town. By the time of the relocation of the Seberang Perai Municipal Council from Butterworth to Bukit Mertajam in 2006, the town's infrastructure had deteriorated extensively. In 1988, the passenger platform of the town's ferry terminal collapsed, costing 32 lives, while in 2001, a fire destroyed a three-storey bus station near the ferry terminal.

In recent years, more efforts have been undertaken to revive the town's fortunes. At present, the ongoing infrastructure projects within Butterworth include Penang Sentral, which is mooted as the main transportation hub within the State of Penang, and by extension, northern Malaysia. Plans to rejuvenate parts of the town centre through the promotion of arts and culture have also been implemented through public-private partnerships.

== Geography ==
Butterworth lies at the southernmost tip of the North Seberang Perai District, between the Perai River to the south and the Penang Strait to the west. The Perai River forms a natural boundary between Butterworth and the neighbouring suburb of Perai, with the latter situated on the southern banks of the river. Both areas are connected via the Prai River Bridge, which spans the width of the Perai River. Butterworth spans an area of 14.6 km^{2} (5.6 sq mi), and includes neighbourhoods such as Bagan Ajam, Bagan Dalam, Bagan Jermal and Bagan Luar.

Map of Butterworth.
Click link at the top right corner to zoom in.
1 North Butterworth Container Terminal (NBCT)
2 Butterworth Wharves
3 Ferry terminal
4 Penang Sentral
5 Butterworth railway station
6 High court
7 Bagan Ajam
8 Bagan Jermal
9 Bagan Dalam
10 Bagan Luar
11 Bagan Specialist Centre
12 Penang International Dental College (PIDC)
13 Bagan Luar Hindu Temple
14 Tow Boo Kong Temple
15 Butterworth Arena
16 Prai River Bridge

== Demographics ==
Ethnicities within Butterworth in 2020
Ethnicities / Nationality	Percentage
Chinese	51.6%
Malays	24.1%
Other Bumiputeras	0.3%
Indians	14.1%
Others	0.5%
Non-Malaysians	9.5%

As of 2020, Butterworth was home to a population of 80,378, resulting in a population density of 5,505/km^{2} (14,260/sq mi). Ethnic Chinese constituted more than half of the city centre's population, while Malays formed another 24%. Indians also comprised over 14% of the population, followed by non-citizens at nearly 10%.

== Economy ==
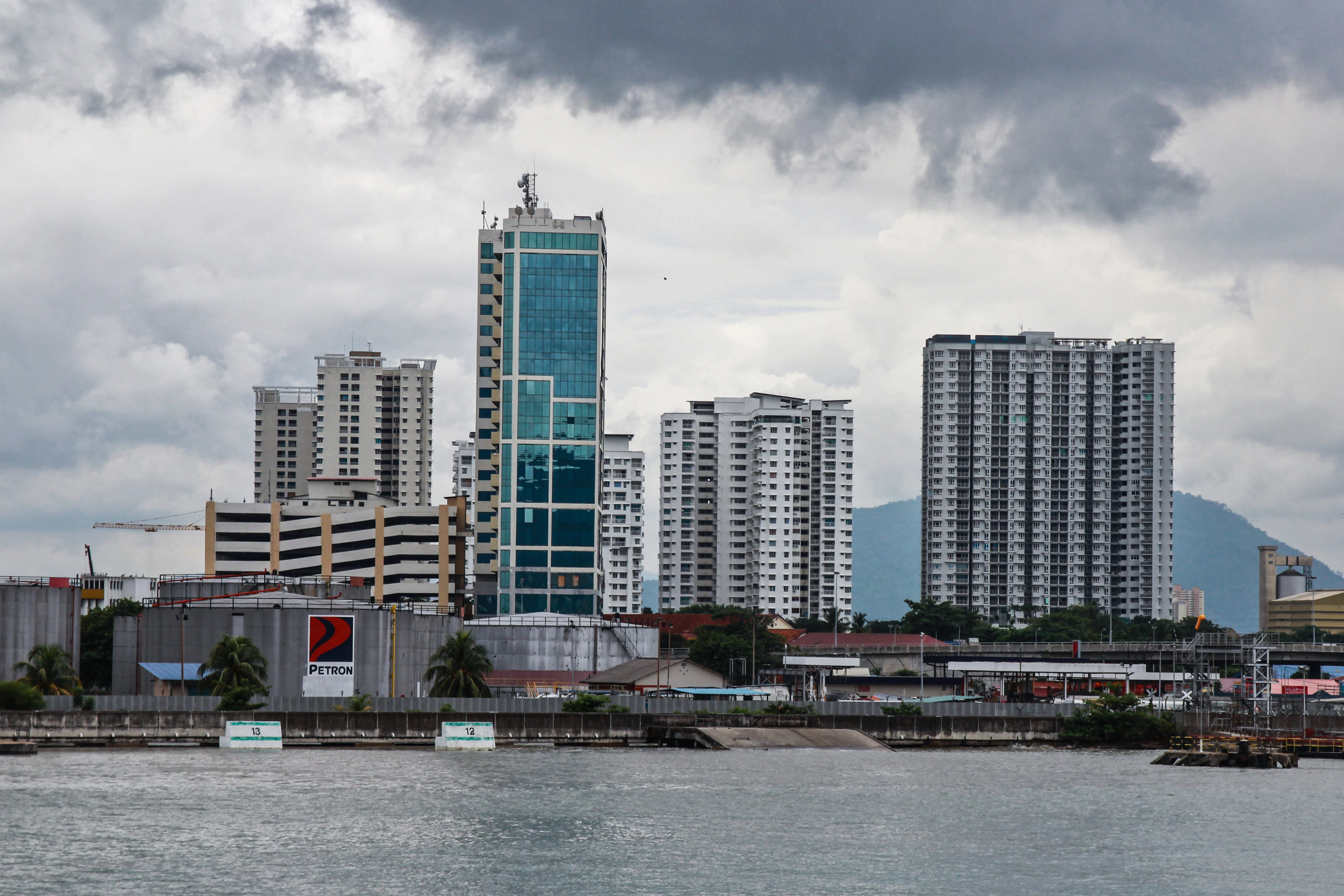
Butterworth as seen from the Penang Strait

The economy of Butterworth is primarily driven by its industries and the maritime trade at the Port of Penang. The Mak Mandin Industrial Estate forms the heart of Butterworth's manufacturing sector and is home to a number of major local firms, including Federal Oats Mills, Fujikura Federal Cables and Zenman Industries. In addition, Butterworth has active steel and tin industries. The former includes steel fabrication, and smaller businesses dealing with automotive parts and scrap metal. The town's tin industry players include Malaysia Smelting Corporation, the world's second largest supplier of tin and a subsidiary of the Singapore-listed Straits Trading Company.

Meanwhile, the Port of Penang is the third busiest seaport in Malaysia, handling 1.52 million TEUs of container in 2017. The Port's strategic location enabled it to service not just northern Malaysia, but also southern Thailand.

== Transportation ==
Butterworth is the main transportation hub within the State of Penang, due to its location by the Penang Strait and its close proximity to George Town on Penang Island.

=== Sea ===
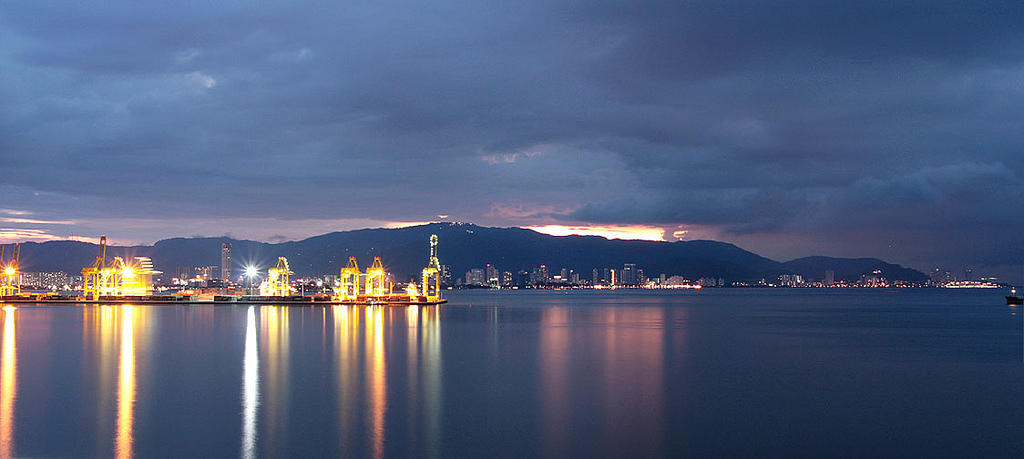
View of the Port of Penang and George Town in the background.

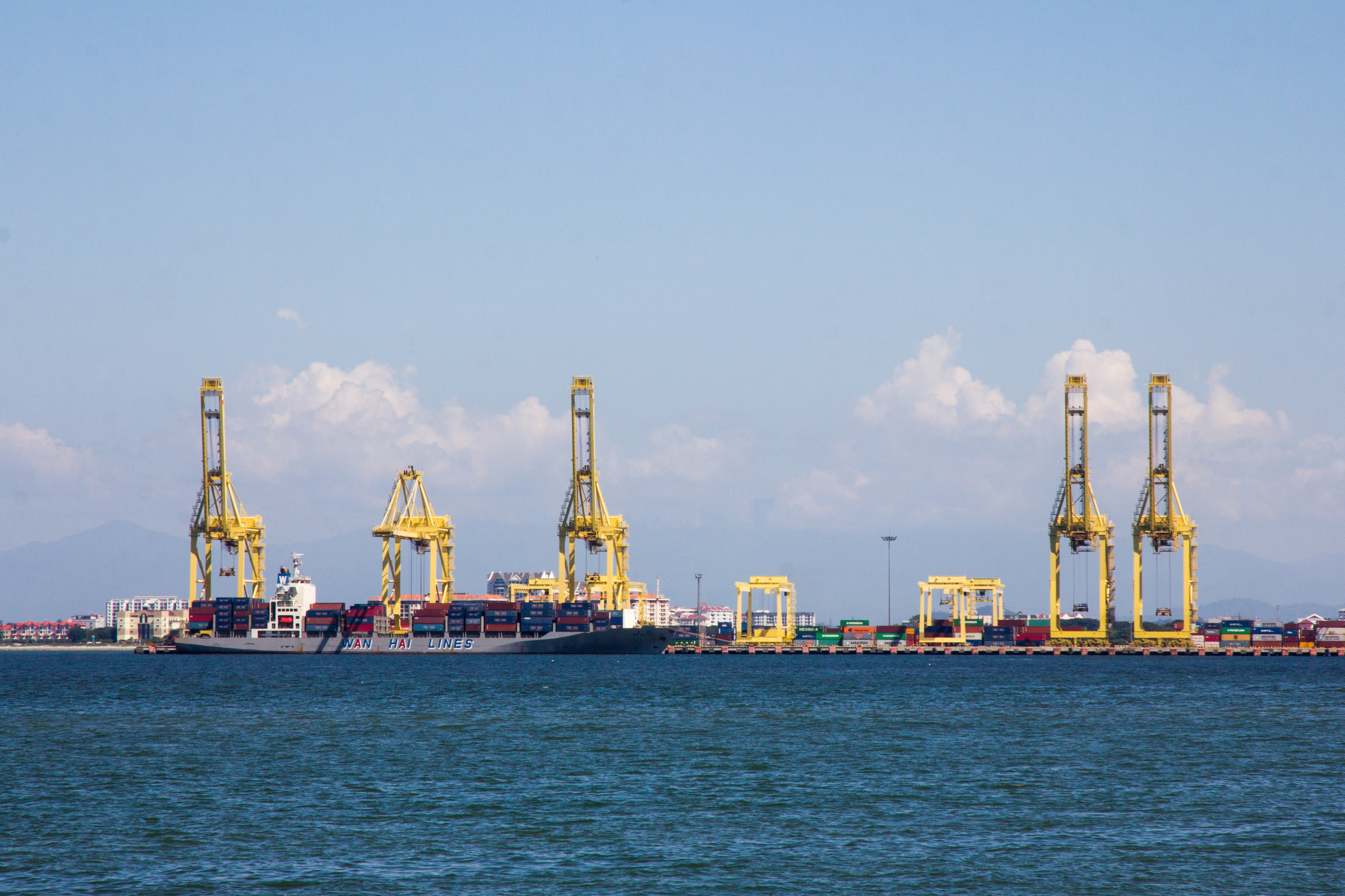
North Butterworth Container Terminal of the Port of Penang

In 1974, the Port of Penang moved its cargo and container operations from George Town on Penang Island to Butterworth. Currently the most important harbour within northern Malaysia, the Port of Penang now operates four facilities within Butterworth.

- North Butterworth Container Terminal
- Butterworth Wharves
- Vegetable oil tanker pier
- Bagan Dalam Dockyard

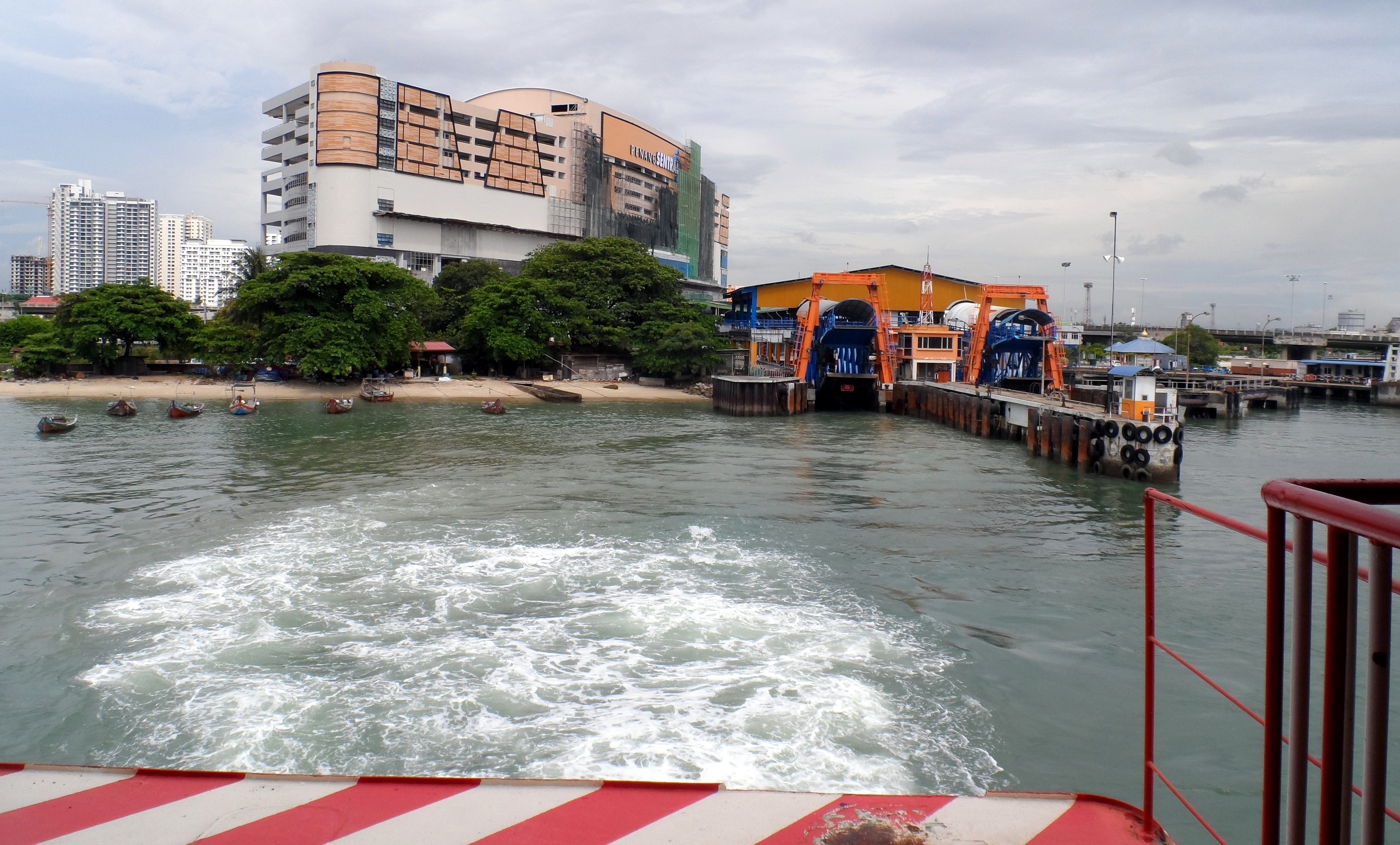
Penang Sentral and Sultan Abdul Halim Ferry Terminal

Penang Ferry is a shuttle ferry service that links Butterworth with George Town. The oldest ferry service in Malaysia commenced operations in 1894, and to this day, serves as a convenient mode of transportation across the Penang Strait for the residents of Butterworth. At present, six ferries ply the Penang Strait between the Sultan Abdul Halim Ferry Terminal in Butterworth and George Town daily.

=== Land ===
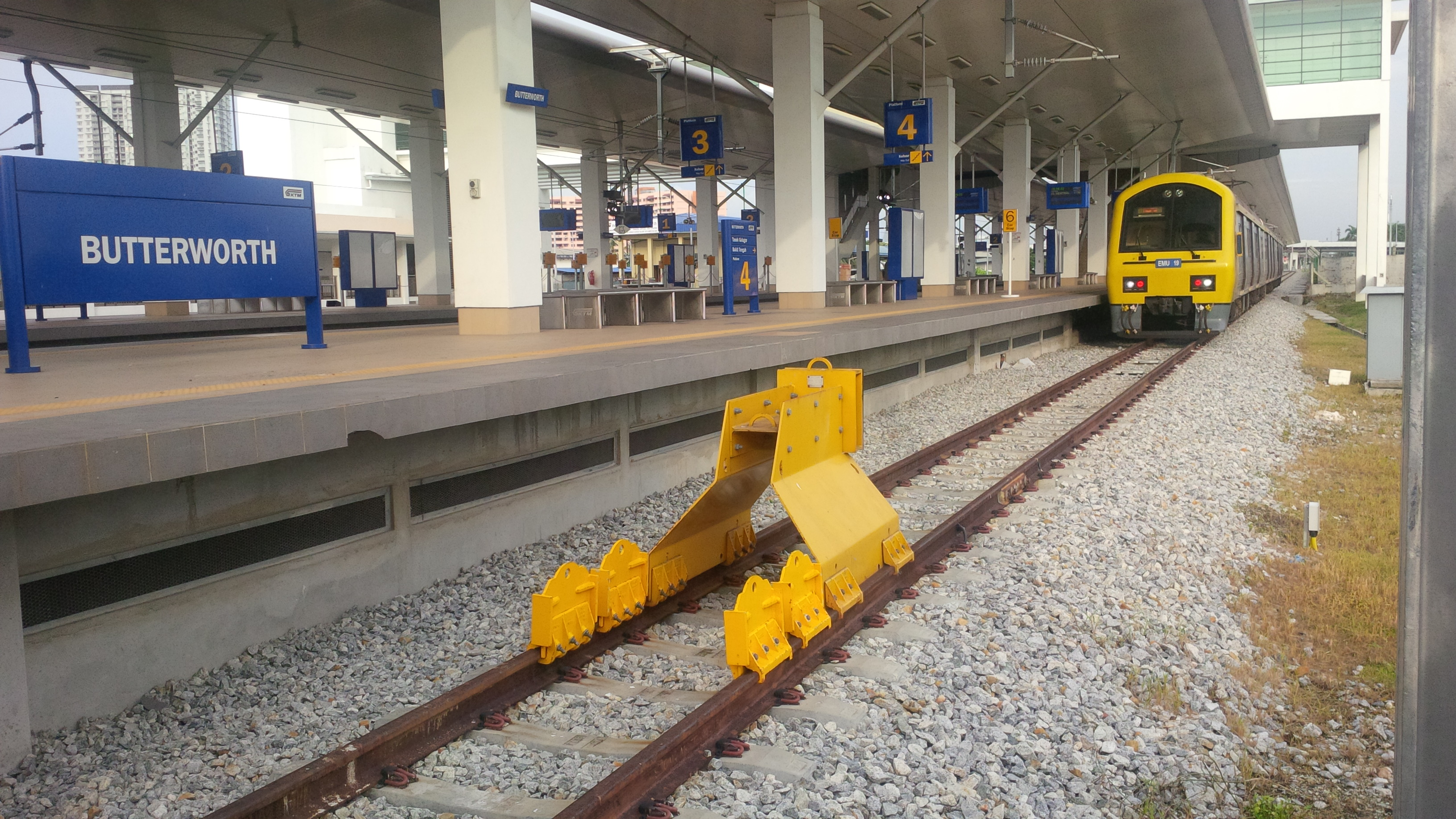
The Butterworth railway station is one of the major train stations in Peninsular Malaysia.

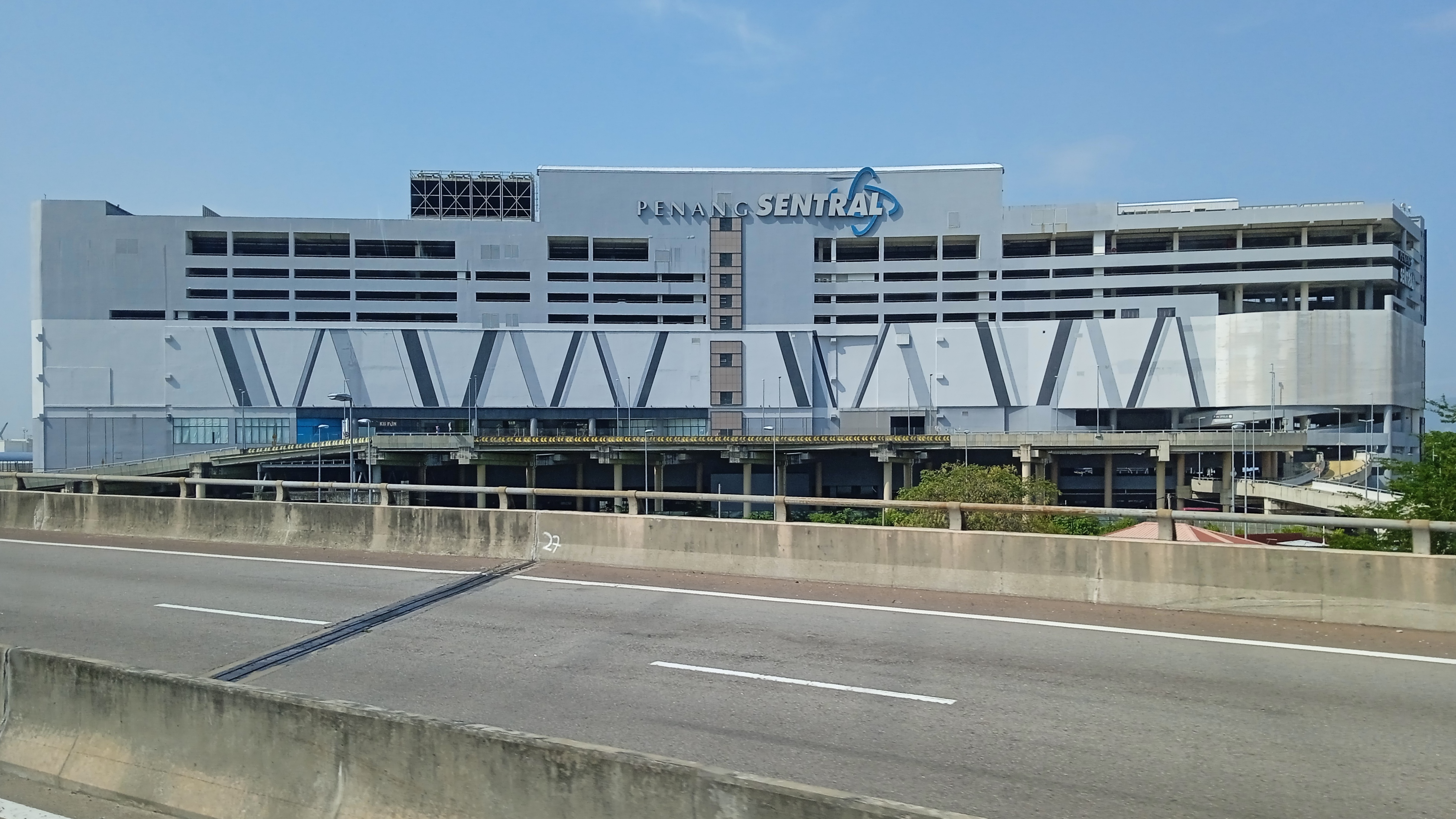
Penang Sentral.

The Butterworth railway station is one of the major stations along the Malayan Railway's west coast route. As such, regular Malayan Railway services are available to other cities along western Peninsular Malaysia, including Ipoh, Kuala Lumpur, Malacca and Johor Bahru, as well as on to Woodlands in northern Singapore. Aside from these, the Butterworth railway station is also the terminus of the State Railway of Thailand's Southern Line (via Padang Besar) and the International Express from Bangkok. Notably, the train station is one of the main stops of the Eastern & Oriental Express service between Bangkok and Singapore as well.

In recent years, the Penang Sentral project has been underway at a site adjacent to both the Butterworth railway station and Sultan Abdul Halim Ferry Terminal. Mooted as the main transportation hub in the State of Penang and as Penang's answer to Kuala Lumpur Sentral, Penang Sentral is intended to serve as a termini for both public bus and longer-distance intercity bus services.

Public bus services are provided by two firms - Rapid Penang and Cityliner. Due to Butterworth's importance as a transportation hub, most of the Rapid Penang's routes originate and terminate within the town. Rapid Penang's bus routes 601, 602, 603, 604, 605, 608, 701, 702, 703, 709 and 801 connect Butterworth with other towns within Seberang Perai, including Perai, Bukit Mertajam, Kepala Batas and Nibong Tebal, whilst the company's Intercity routes link Butterworth with Sungai Petani in Kedah and Parit Buntar in Perak. Cityliner operates another six bus routes which link Butterworth with a handful of destinations in Seberang Perai, Kedah and Perak.

Meanwhile, the Butterworth Outer Ring Road (BORR) was completed in 2005 in order to reduce traffic congestion along the North–South Expressway east of the town, as well as facilitating traffic dispersion within Butterworth itself. The BORR includes the Prai River Bridge, a cable-stayed bridge that links Butterworth and Perai to the south. Another major expressway within Butterworth is the Butterworth–Kulim Expressway, an interstate highway that connects Butterworth with Kulim in Kedah.

== Education ==
Butterworth contains a total of 20 primary schools, nine Secondary schools, a government-run vocational college and three private tertiary institutions.

Primary schools

- SRK Assumption
- SRK Convent Butterworth
- SRK Bagan Ajam
- SRK Bagan Jermal
- SRK Bagan Tuan Kechil
- SRK Kuala Perai
- SRK Mak Mandin
- SRK Seri Gemilang
- SRK St Mark
- SRK Sungai Nyior
- SRK Sungai Puyu
- SRK Taman Senangan
- SRK Telok Ayer Tawar
- SRJK (C) Chung Hwa 1
- SRJK (C) CHung Hwa 2
- SJK (C) Chung Hwa Pusat
- SRJK (C) Kwang Hua
- SRJK (C) Li Hwa
- SRJK (C) Mak Mandin
- SRJK (T) Mak Mandin

Secondary schools

- Bagan Jaya National Secondary School
- SMK Datuk Onn
- SMK Gemilang
- SMK Kampong Kastam
- SMK Mak Mandin
- SMK Telok Ayer Tawar
- Convent Butterworth
- St. Mark's Secondary School
- Chung Ling Butterworth High School

Vocational college

- Butterworth Vocational College

Private colleges

- Penang International Dental College
- Golden Chef College of Culinary Arts
- Surya College

== Health care ==
Butterworth is served by one private hospital - the Bagan Specialist Centre. Established in 1988, the 150-bed hospital also contains nine operating theatres and offers, among others, orthopaedic and endocrinology treatments.

== Tourist attractions ==
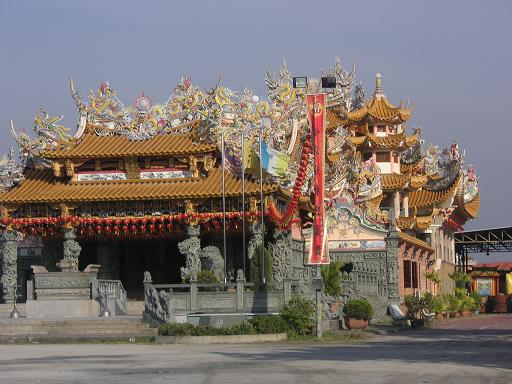
Tow Boo Kong Temple at Jalan Raja Uda

The Tow Boo Kong Temple is a Taoist temple which is dedicated to the Taoist principal Deity, Doumu and the Nine Emperor Gods. Built in stages between the 1970s and 2009, the temple at Jalan Raja Uda now serves as a focal point for the grand celebration of Nine Emperor Gods Festival, which occurs annually on the ninth day of the ninth lunar month in the Chinese calendar.

The Sree Maha Mariamman Devasthanam Temple, at Bagan Luar, is the oldest Hindu temple in Butterworth. Founded in 1853, the temple is dedicated to the Hindu deity, Mariamman, a goddess of rain. Urban legend has it that the temple was built when a statue of Mariamman was found by the seaside.

As part of efforts to revive the fortunes of Butterworth, a number of alleys within the town centre have been decorated with wall murals, similar in style to the street art in George Town. In addition, the Butterworth Fringe Festival, inaugurated in 2015 as a spin-off to the George Town Festival, is an annual arts festival held within the town centre every August.

== Military ==
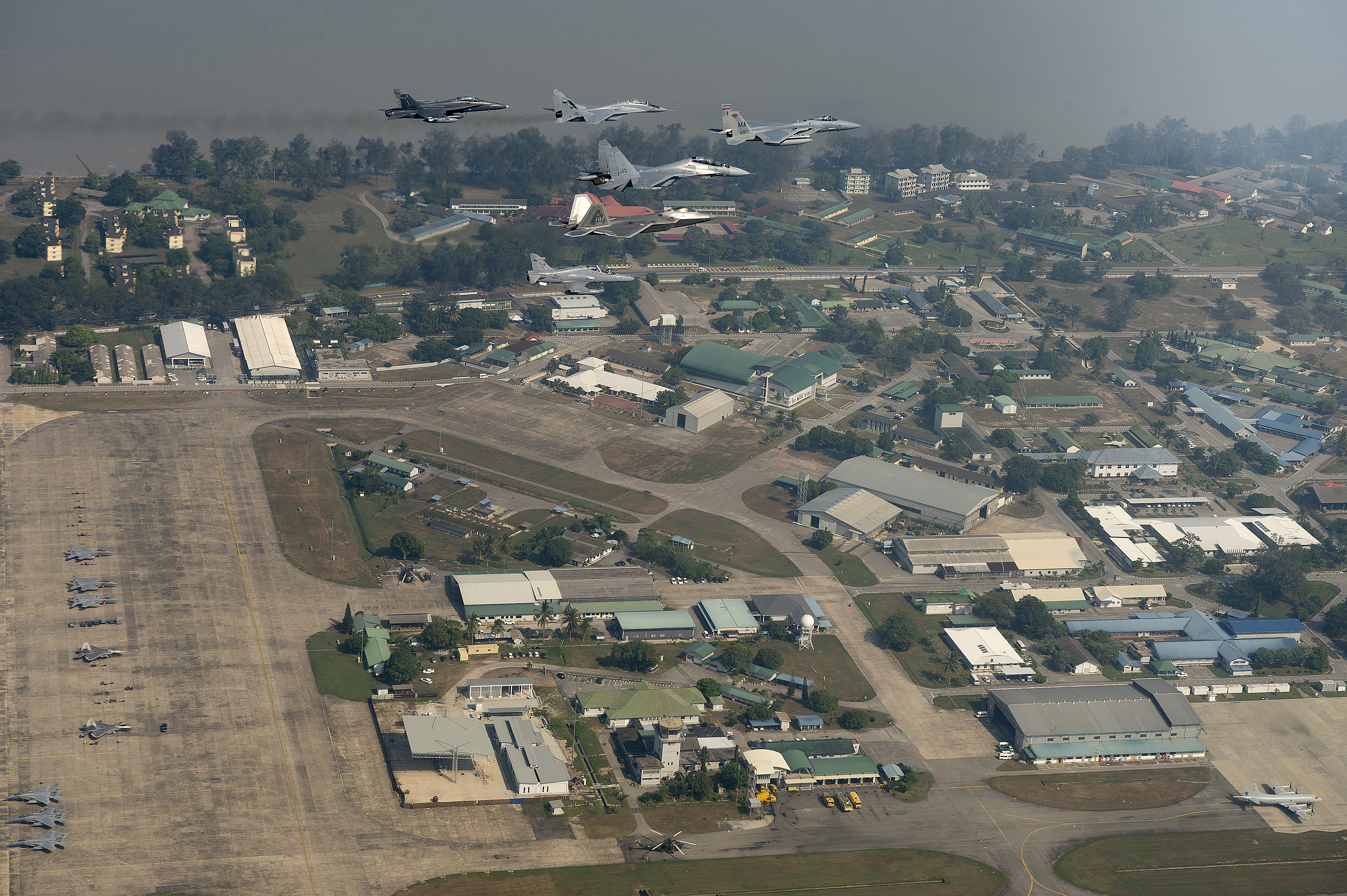
Fighter jets of the Royal Malaysian Air Force and the United States Air Force over RMAF Butterworth

A Royal Malaysian Air Force airfield - RMAF Butterworth - is located to the north of Butterworth proper. Completed by the British in 1941 just prior to the Japanese invasion of Malaya, the airfield served both the Royal Air Force and Royal Australian Air Force squadrons tasked with defending the airspace over Penang. However, the Japanese immediately gained air superiority, damaging the Butterworth airfield in the process. The station was then captured by the Imperial Japanese 25th Army on 20 December 1941.

During the post-war period, the Butterworth airfield was put to use by the Royal Air Force, and subsequently, the Royal Australian Air Force, to combat the communist threat in Malaya at the time. The Australian squadrons based in Butterworth also saw action during the Indonesian Confrontation in the 1960s.

In 1988, the Butterworth airfield was handed over to the Royal Malaysian Air Force. Now renamed as RMAF Butterworth, the airfield housed the headquarters of the Integrated Area Defence System that covers both Malaysia and Singapore under the Five Power Defence Arrangements.

== Neighbourhoods ==
The following neighbourhoods are situated within Butterworth.

- Bagan Ajam
- Bagan Dalam
- Bagan Luar
- Bagan Jermal
