= Siti Mastura Muhammad =

Malaysian politician

Yang Berhormat Dr. Siti Mastura Muhammad MP
- سيتي مستورا محمد
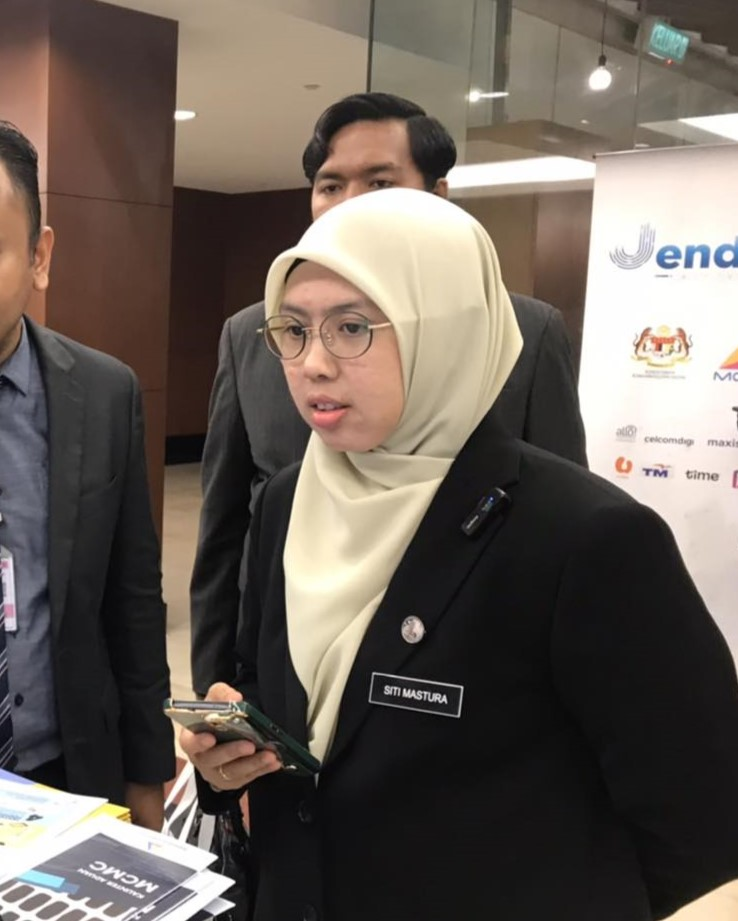
- Siti Mastura in 2023

Member of the Malaysian Parliament for Kepala Batas
- Incumbent
- Assumed office 19 November 2022
- Preceded by: Reezal Merican Naina Merican (BN–UMNO)
- Majority: 2,867 (2022)

Personal details
- Born: Siti Mastura binti Muhammad; 27 August 1989 (age 36) Permatang Tinggi C, Pinang Tunggal, North Seberang Perai District, Penang, Malaysia
- Party: Malaysian Islamic Party (PAS)
- Other political affiliations: Perikatan Nasional (PN)
- Spouse: Asyrul Firdaus Hasnul
- Children: 1
- Parent(s): Muhammad Kassim (father); Masnah L. Hamid (mother)
- Occupation: Politician

Siti Mastura binti Muhammad (born 27 August 1989) is a Malaysian politician who has served as the Member of Parliament (MP) for Kepala Batas since November 2022. At the grassroots level, she is the deputy head of the Penang State PAS Muslimat Council.

== Controversy ==
During her tenure as Member of Parliament for Kepala Batas, she made allegations against Lim Guan Eng on his family ties with the first Singaporean Prime Minister Lee Kuan Yew and Malayan Communist Party leader Chin Peng. In November 2023, Siti Mastura made the claim in her 46-minute speech to the PAS Muslimat and the Kemaman PAS young women wing members ahead of the upcoming Kemaman by-election. Aside from alleged family relations with Chin and Lee, Siti Mastura also claimed that Lim is related to other DAP leaders such as secretary-general Anthony Loke, Nga Kor Ming, Ngeh Koo Ham, and Teresa Kok.

Lim criticised Siti Mastura's claim, stating "This is not just a personal attack but has racial undertones as well. It is a spiteful allegation against my father (DAP veteran Lim Kit Siang) and me”. After both parties failed to reach an agreement at a court-ordered mediation, the case is set for trial in September 2024 with Siti Mastura as the defendant and Lim Kit Siang, Lim Guan Eng, and Teresa Kok as plaintiffs. Siti Mastura maintained that her allegations are true, citing statements from a Barisan Nasional election pamphlet as evidence. However, she has not addressed criticism over her mispronunciation of Lee Kuan Yew's surname as "Lim" instead of "Lee," an error widely mocked as an attempt to associate the late Singaporean prime minister with the unrelated Lim political family.

In December 2024, the Penang High Court ruled that Siti Mastura's statements were defamatory and unsupported by evidence. She was ordered to pay a total of RM750,000 in damages and RM25,000 as costs to the plaintiffs. Siti Mastura appealed the decision but it was dismissed by the Court of Appeal.

== Election results ==
Parliament of Malaysia
Year	Constituency	Candidate	Votes	Pct	Opponent(s)	Votes	Pct	Ballots cast	Majority	Turnout
2018	P041 Kepala Batas	Siti Mastura Muhammad (PAS)	12,120	23.17%	Reezal Merican Naina Merican (UMNO)	22,459	42.94%	53,127	4,736	87.78%
2018	P041 Kepala Batas	Siti Mastura Muhammad (PAS)	12,120	23.17%	Zaidi Zakaria (AMANAH)	17,723	33.89%	53,127	4,736	87.78%
2022	P041 Kepala Batas	Siti Mastura Muhammad (PAS)	28,604	41.27%	Reezal Merican Naina Merican (UMNO)	25,737	37.14%	69,302	2,867	83.41%
2022	P041 Kepala Batas	Siti Mastura Muhammad (PAS)	28,604	41.27%	Muhammad Daniel Abdul Majeed (MUDA)	14,214	20.51%	69,302	2,867	83.41%
2022	P041 Kepala Batas	Siti Mastura Muhammad (PAS)	28,604	41.27%	Hamidi Abu Hassan (PEJUANG)	747	1.08%	69,302	2,867	83.41%

== Honours ==
=== Honours of Malaysia ===
- Malaysia
  - Recipient of the 17th Yang di-Pertuan Agong Installation Medal (2024)
