= Bagan Jermal =

Bagan Jermal may refer to:

- Bagan Jermal, Butterworth, area within the town of Butterworth, Penang, Malaysia
- Bagan Jermal (state constituency), state constituency in Penang, Malaysia
