= Reezal Merican Naina Merican =

Malaysian politician and banker

Yang Berhormat Dato' Seri Reezal Merican Naina Merican SSAP DGPN DIMP MLA
- ريزال ماريکان ناينا ماريکان
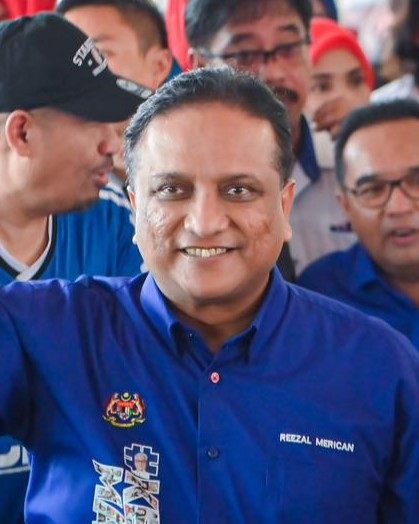
- Reezal Merican in 2022

9th chairman of the Malaysia External Trade Development Corporation
- Incumbent
- Assumed office 1 May 2023
- Minister: Tengku Zafrul Aziz
- Chief Executive Officer: Mohd Mustafa Abdul Aziz

Minister of Housing and Local Government
- In office 30 August 2021 – 24 November 2022
- Monarch: Abdullah
- Prime Minister: Ismail Sabri Yaakob
- Deputy: Ismail Muttalib
- Preceded by: Zuraida Kamaruddin
- Succeeded by: Nga Kor Ming (Minister of Local Government Development)
- Constituency: Kepala Batas

Minister of Youth and Sports
- In office 10 March 2020 – 16 August 2021
- Monarch: Abdullah
- Prime Minister: Muhyiddin Yassin
- Deputy: Wan Ahmad Fayhsal Wan Ahmad Kamal
- Preceded by: Syed Saddiq Syed Abdul Rahman
- Succeeded by: Ahmad Faizal Azumu
- Constituency: Kepala Batas

Deputy Minister of Foreign Affairs
- In office 29 July 2015 – 10 May 2018
- Monarchs: Abdul Halim (2015–2016); Muhammad V (2016–2018)
- Prime Minister: Najib Razak
- Minister: Anifah Aman
- Preceded by: Hamzah Zainudin
- Succeeded by: Marzuki Yahya
- Constituency: Kepala Batas

Chief of the Elections Department of the United Malays National Organisation
- Incumbent
- Assumed office 22 March 2023
- President: Ahmad Zahid Hamidi

Member of the Penang State Legislative Assembly for Bertam
- Incumbent
- Assumed office 12 August 2023
- Preceded by: Khaliq Mehtab Mohd Ishaq (PH–BERSATU)
- Majority: 2,321 (2023)

Member of the Malaysian Parliament for Kepala Batas
- In office 5 May 2013 – 19 November 2022
- Preceded by: Abdullah Ahmad Badawi (BN–UMNO)
- Succeeded by: Siti Mastura Muhammad (PN–PAS)
- Majority: 4,176 (2013); 4,736 (2018)

Faction represented in Penang State Legislative Assembly
- 2023–: Barisan Nasional

Faction represented in Dewan Rakyat
- 2013–2022: Barisan Nasional

Personal details
- Born: Reezal Merican bin Naina Merican; 29 July 1972 (age 54) Kepala Batas, Seberang Perai Utara, Penang, Malaysia
- Citizenship: Malaysian
- Party: United Malays National Organisation (UMNO)
- Other political affiliations: Barisan Nasional (BN)
- Spouse(s): Ismalina Ismail, Sharifah Norhaslinda
- Education: International Islamic University Malaysia

Reezal Merican bin Naina Merican (Jawi: ريزال ماريکان بن ناينا ماريکان; born 29 July 1972) is a Malaysian politician and banker who has served as the 9th chairman of the Malaysia External Trade Development Corporation (MATRADE) since May 2023 and member of the Penang State Legislative Assembly (MLA) for Bertam since August 2023. He served as the minister of housing and local government in the Barisan Nasional (BN) administration under former prime minister Ismail Sabri Yaakob from August 2021 to the collapse of the BN administration in November 2022, the minister of youth and sports in the Perikatan Nasional (PN) administration under former prime minister Muhyiddin Yassin from March 2020 to the collapse of the PN administration in August 2021 and the member of parliament (MP) for Kepala Batas from the retirement of 5th and former prime minister Abdullah Ahmad Badawi as the MP from politics in May 2013 to his electoral defeat in November 2022. He is also a member and division chief of Kepala Batas of the Supreme Council of the United Malays National Organisation (UMNO), a component party of the BN coalition and one of the only two Penang BN and UMNO MLAs alongside MLA for Sungai Acheh Rashidi Zinol. He has also served as chief of the Elections Department of UMNO since March 2023. He is an ethnic Malay of mixed Indian descent.

== Early and political career ==
Before entering Parliament, Reezal worked in the bank sector. Reezal took over Abdullah as the party's division head of Kepala Batas and as the Barisan Nasional (BN) candidate for the parliamentary seat. Reezal won the seat in the 2013 Malaysian general election while defeated a candidate from the Malaysian Islamic Party (PAS) by 4,176 majority of the votes. In October 2013, he was elected to Supreme Council of UMNO, the highest-ranking body of the party. In a cabinet reshuffle on 28 July 2015, Reezal was picked as Deputy Minister of Foreign Affairs by former prime minister Najib Razak. Despite winning the majority to defend his seat in his parliamentary constituency, Reezal lost his cabinet post following the results of the 2018 Malaysian general election. At the 2023 Penang state election, he alongside Rashidi Zinol are the only Malay representatives in the PH-BN Unity Government elected from the mainland Seberang Perai part of Penang.

== Controversy ==
On 29 August 2015, Reezal intimidated Malaysians participating in the Bersih 4 demonstrations abroad that the Foreign Ministry would gather their information for eventual legal action against them, without even citing which law the citizen abroad violated.

== Personal life ==
After first wife Ismalina Ismail and second wife Sharifah Norhaslinda which once filed for divorce with Reezal but retracted.

== Election results ==
Parliament of Malaysia
Year	Constituency	Candidate	Votes	Pct	Opponent(s)	Votes	Pct	Ballots cast	Majority	Turnout
2013	P041 Kepala Batas	Reezal Merican Naina Merican (UMNO)	25,128	54.53%	Afnan Hamimi Taib Azamudden (PAS)	20,952	45.47%	46,738	4,176	90.52%
2018	P041 Kepala Batas	Reezal Merican Naina Merican (UMNO)	22,459	42.94%	Zaidi Zakaria (AMANAH)	17,723	33.89%	53,127	4,736	87.78%
2018	P041 Kepala Batas	Reezal Merican Naina Merican (UMNO)	22,459	42.94%	Siti Mastura Muhammad (PAS)	12,120	23.17%	53,127	4,736	87.78%
2022	P041 Kepala Batas	Reezal Merican Naina Merican (UMNO)	25,737	37.14%	Siti Mastura Muhammad (PAS)	28,604	41.27%	69,302	2,867	83.41%
2022	P041 Kepala Batas	Reezal Merican Naina Merican (UMNO)	25,737	37.14%	Muhammad Daniel Abdul Majeed (MUDA)	14,214	20.51%	69,302	2,867	83.41%
2022	P041 Kepala Batas	Reezal Merican Naina Merican (UMNO)	25,737	37.14%	Hamidi Abu Hassan (PEJUANG)	747	1.08%	69,302	2,867	83.41%

Penang State Legislative Assembly
Year	Constituency	Candidate	Votes	Pct	Opponent(s)	Votes	Pct	Ballots cast	Majority	Turnout
2023	N02 Bertam	Reezal Merican Naina Merican (UMNO)	10,453	56.24%	Khaliq Mehtab Mohd Ishaq (BERSATU)	8,132	43.76%	18,711	2,321	77.44%

== Honours ==
- Pahang
  - Knight Grand Companion of the Order of Sultan Ahmad Shah of Pahang (SSAP) – Dato' Sri (2008)
  - Knight Companion of the Order of the Crown of Pahang (DIMP) – Dato' (2006)
- Penang
  - Commander of the Order of the Defender of State (DGPN) – Dato' Seri (2023)

== See also ==
- Kepala Batas (federal constituency)
- Bertam (state constituency)
