= Sree Maha Mariamman Devasthanam Temple, Butterworth =

Hindu temple in Bagan Luar, Penang, Malaysia

Bagan Luar Shree Maha Mariamman Temple
- Location in Malaysia

Religion
- Affiliation: Hinduism
- District: Butterworth
- Deity: Mariamman

Location
- Location: Bagan Luar
- State: Penang
- Country: Malaysia
- Interactive map of Bagan Luar Shree Maha Mariamman Temple
- Coordinates: 5°24′45″N 100°22′12″E

Architecture
- Type: Dravidian architecture

Sree Maha Mariamman Devasthanam Temple is a Hindu temple in Bagan Luar, Penang, Malaysia. It is in fact the biggest and probably oldest Hindu temple in Butterworth. Maha Mariamman Devasthanam, a temple dedicated to the mother deity Amman, is the temple for the Hindu community that dwells along Jalan Jeti Lama. The area within the vicinity is a Hindu settlement called Kampung Benggali. Today, there is still a substantial Hindu population living in the area The Hindus are mostly associated with the Butterworth port. They either worked directly there, or provided supporting trades such as opening sundry shop and food outlets.

The Maha Mariamman Devasthanam Temple is noted for its impressive gopuram which towers over the buildings in the vicinity.

== History ==
The Butterworth Sree Maha Mariamman temple was founded back in 1853. Ambal's idol was found by the seaside on 1853 and a small hut was built consecutively to place Ambal's idol for worship. In 1903, Ponnusami Pillai constructed a temple on the same spot and the 1st consecration ceremony (Kumbabishegam) took place. The current temple structure was built in 1980's with the consecration ceremony taking place on 1988. On 2002, after some minor renovation works, another consecration ceremony took place.

== See also ==
- List of Hindu temples in Malaysia
