= Hilmi Abdul Rashid =

Malaysian politician

Yang Berbahagia Dato' Hilmi Abdul Rashid DIMP DSPN DJN PKT

Member of the Penang State Legislative Assembly for Bertam
- In office 25 April 1995 – 8 March 2008
- Preceded by: Abdul Rahman Abbas (BN–UMNO)
- Succeeded by: Zabariah Wahab (BN–UMNO)
- Majority: 5,402 (1995); 3,790 (1999); 5,265 (2004)

Personal details
- Born: Kampung Permatang Bertam, Bertam, Penang
- Party: United Malays National Organisation (UMNO)
- Other political affiliations: Barisan Nasional (BN)

Hilmi bin Abdul Rashid is a Malaysian politician who served as Member of the Penang State Legislative Assembly (MLA) for Bertam from April 1995 to March 2008. He is a member of United Malays National Organisation (UMNO), a component party of Barisan Nasional (BN).

== Election results ==
Penang State Legislative Assembly
Year	Constituency	Candidate	Votes	Pct	Opponent(s)	Votes	Pct	Ballots cast	Majority	Turnout
1995	N02 Bertam	Hilmi Abdul Rashid (UMNO)	6,632	84.36%	Jamilah Khaton Zainal Abidin (S46)	1,230	15.64%	8,082	5,402	71.09%
1999	N02 Bertam	Hilmi Abdul Rashid (UMNO)	6,256	71.73%	Md Ariffin Mas Nayeem (keADILan)	2,466	28.27%	8,973	3,790	79.28%
2004	N02 Bertam	Hilmi Abdul Rashid (UMNO)	7,615	76.42%	Mahamad Rashim (PKR)	2,350	23.58%	10,159	5,265	81.94%

== Honours ==
- Pahang
  - Knight Companion of the Order of the Crown of Pahang (DIMP) – Dato' (2002)
- Penang
  - Officer of the Order of the Defender of State (DSPN) – Dato' (2005)
  - Member of the Order of the Defender of State (DJN) (2001)
  - Recipient of the Distinguished Conduct Medal (PKT) (1999)
