= Khaliq Mehtab Mohd Ishaq =

Malaysian politician, businessman and lawyer

- خالق مهتاب محمد إسحاق

Member of the Supreme Council of the Malaysian United Indigenous Party
- In office 18 January 2025 – 29 October 2025
- President: Muhyiddin Yassin

10th Chairman of the Penang Regional Development Authority
- In office 21 May 2020 – 3 December 2022
- Preceded by: Mohamed Haniff Khatri Abdulla
- Succeeded by: Shaik Hussein Mydin

Member of the Penang State Legislative Assembly for Bertam
- In office 9 May 2018 – 6 March 2023
- Preceded by: Shariful Azhar Othman (BN–UMNO)
- Succeeded by: Reezal Merican Naina Merican (BN–UMNO)
- Majority: 217 (2018)

Personal details
- Born: Khaliq Mehtab bin Mohd Ishaq; 25 June 1976 (age 50) Malaysia
- Citizenship: Malaysian
- Party: Malaysian United Indigenous Party (BERSATU) (2016–2026); National Vision Party (WAWASAN) (since 2026)
- Other political affiliations: Pakatan Harapan (PH) (2017–2020); Perikatan Nasional (PN) (since 2020)
- Spouse: Nor Azizurahmah Abdul Aziz
- Relations: Azlina Mehtab (sister)
- Occupation: Politician; businessman
- Profession: Lawyer

Khaliq Mehtab bin Mohd Ishaq (born 25 June 1976) is a Malaysian politician, businessman and lawyer who served as Member of the Penang State Legislative Assembly (MLA) for Bertam from May 2018 to March 2023 and 10th Chairman of the Penang Regional Development Authority (PERDA) from May 2020 to December 2022. He is a member of the National Vision Party (WAWASAN) and was a member of the Malaysian United Indigenous Party (BERSATU), a component party of the Perikatan Nasional (PN) and formerly the Pakatan Harapan (PH) coalitions.

== Personal life ==
He is the younger brother of Azlina Mehtab, former Women's Chief of UMNO in Penang. His mother is a Chinese and he communicates with his mother using Hokkien since he was young, although he cannot speak Mandarin Chinese.

== Career ==
He is a lawyer in Messrs. Azlina Mehtab & Associates.

He was appointed as the Chairman of Penang Regional Development Authority on 21 May 2020 to replace Mohamed Haniff Khatri Abdulla.

== Politics ==
He joined BERSATU in September 2016. He competed for Bertam in 2018 Malaysian general election and won the seat.

== Election results ==
Penang State Legislative Assembly
Year	Constituency	Candidate	Votes	Pct	Opponent(s)	Votes	Pct	Ballots cast	Majority	Turnout
2018	N02 Bertam	Khaliq Mehtab Mohd Ishaq (BERSATU)	6,485	40.57%	Shariful Azhar Othman (UMNO)	6,268	39.21%	15,984	217	86.97%
2018	N02 Bertam	Khaliq Mehtab Mohd Ishaq (BERSATU)	6,485	40.57%	Moktar Ramly (PAS)	2,986	18.68%	15,984	217	86.97%
2023	N02 Bertam	Khaliq Mehtab Mohd Ishaq (BERSATU)	8,132	43.76%	Reezal Merican Naina Merican (UMNO)	10,453	56.24%	18,585	2,321	77.44%
