= Bagan Jaya National Secondary School =

- Sekolah Menengah Kebangsaan Bagan Jaya (in Malay) 峇眼再也国民中学 (in Chinese)
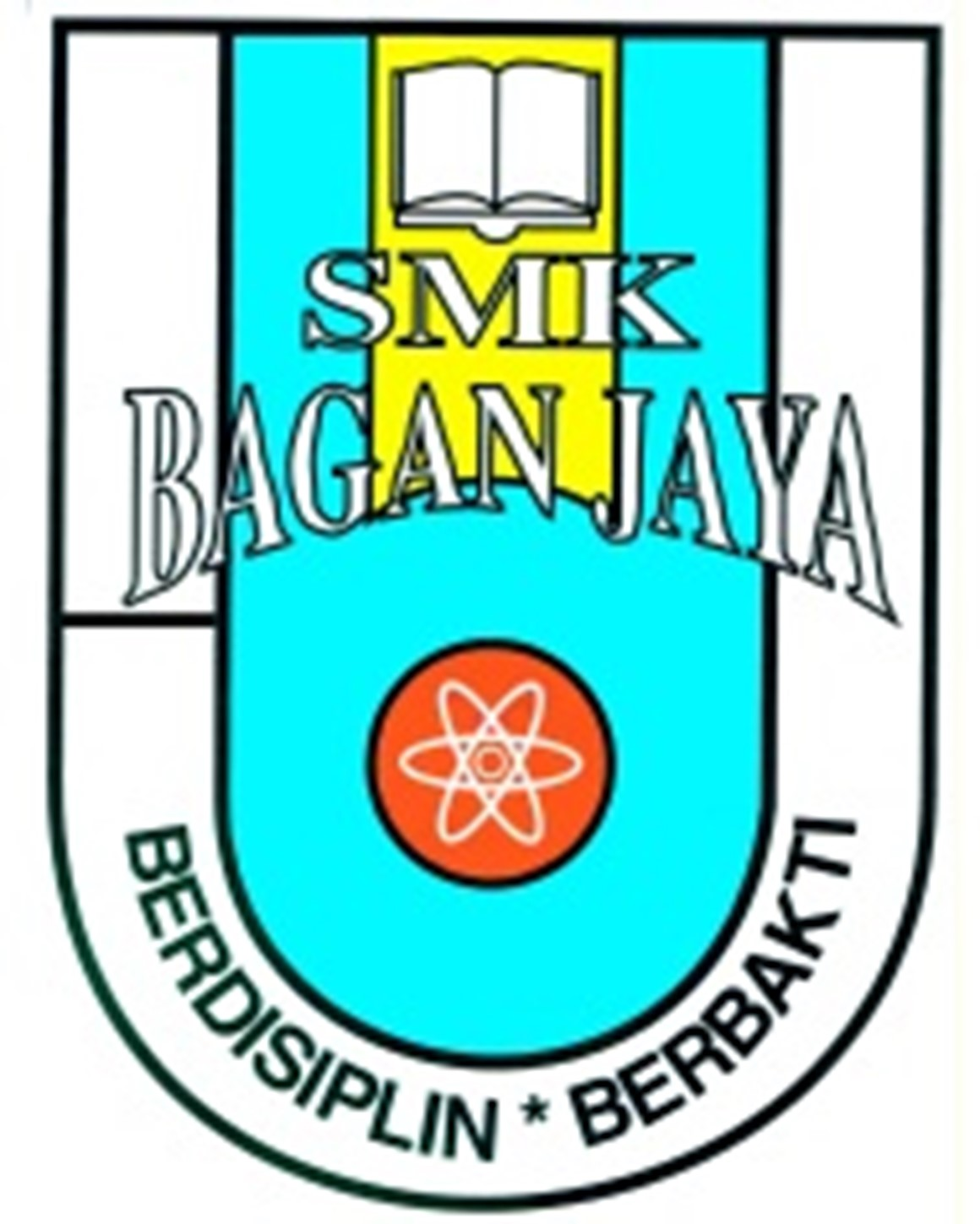

Location
- Jalan Ong Yi How,13400, Butterworth, Penang, Malaysia; 5.42767°N 100.39217°E

Information
- Type: Public school
- Motto: Berdisiplin, Berbakti (Disciplined, Devoted)
- Founded: 1998
- Principal: Pn Hor Siau Eng
- Grades: Remove, Form 1-5
- Enrolment: 2000++
- Classes offered: Science, Commerce, Arts and Gas Welding
- Houses: Blue, Green, Yellow, Red
- Website: SMK Bagan Jaya Official Facebook

Bagan Jaya National Secondary School (Malay: Sekolah Menengah Kebangsaan Bagan Jaya; Chinese: 峇眼再也国民中学; pinyin: Bā yǎn zài yě guómín zhōngxué; Pe̍h-ōe-jī: Bagan chài iā Kok-bîn Tiong-o̍h), formerly known as Kampung Simpah National Secondary School, is a national secondary school in Mak Mandin, Seberang Perai, Penang, Malaysia. Due to the school's location within a Chinese-majority area, majority of its students are ethnic Chinese, despite bearing the term National in its name. It provides secondary education to students from Remove Class up until Form 5.
