= Bagan Ajam =

- Neighbourhood
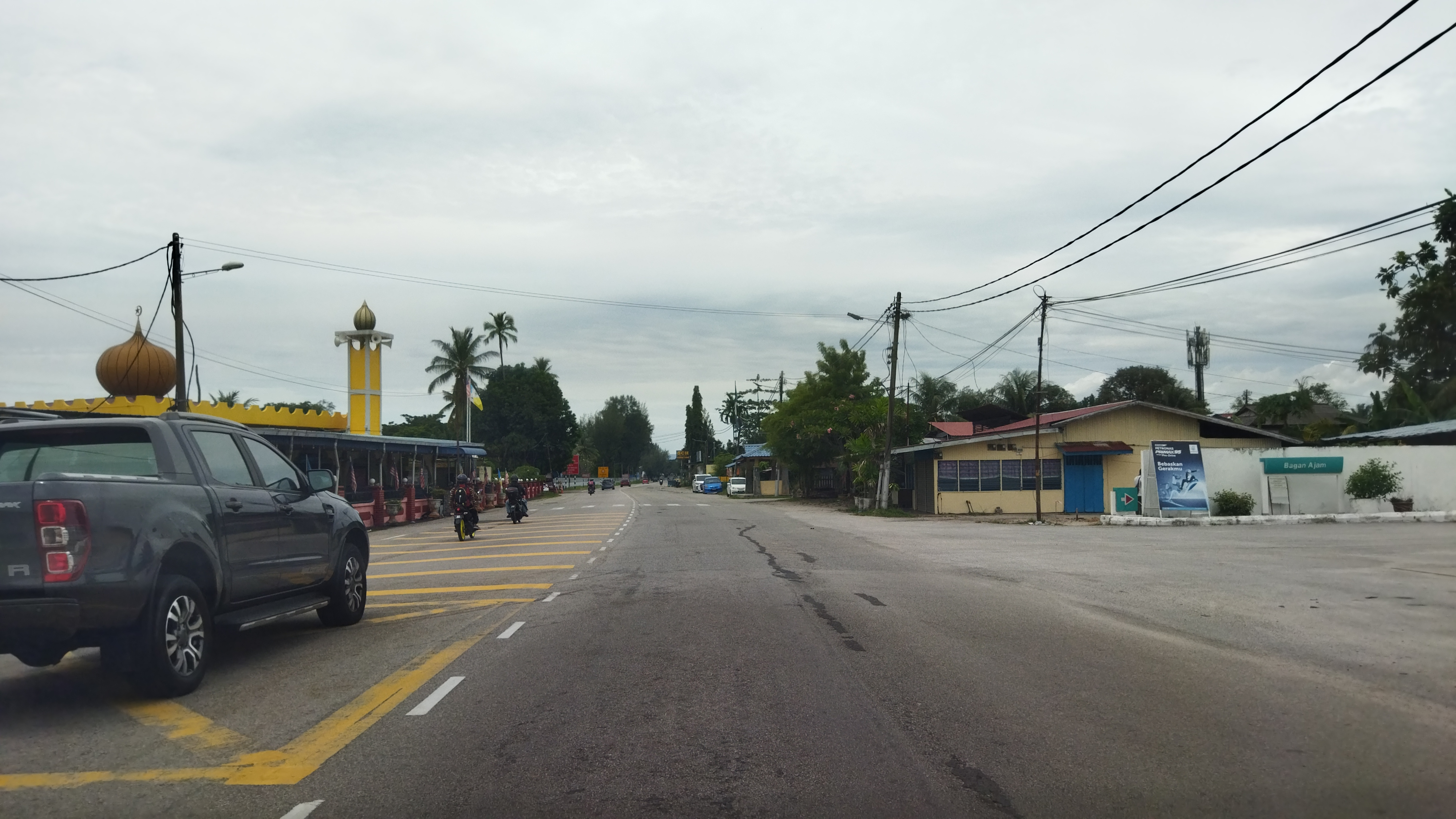

- Location within Seberang Perai in Penang
- Coordinates: 5°26′35.4″N 100°22′48.3″E
- County: Malaysia
- State: Penang
- City: Seberang Perai
- District: North Seberang Perai
- Time zone: UTC+8 (MST)
  - Summer (DST): Not observed

Bagan Ajam is a residential neighbourhood within the city of Seberang Perai in the Malaysian state of Penang. It is best known for its morning market, where most residents will be, especially on weekends. Pantai Bagan Ajam is a beach here that is popular among the locals. Bagan Ajam and the whole of Butterworth have gone through changes with construction of the Butterworth Outer Ring Road.

The road was completed in 2006. A Bagan Ajam rest and service area is located on the highway. This outer ring road was built very near to the sea only. Travelers can enjoy a seaview here and some cargo ships sightseeing. Bagan Ajam also has a toll plaza with 15 toll booths. There is one Touch 'n Go lane and one Smart TAG lane because Bagan Ajam is a residential area.

Bagan Ajam is located 3 kilometers from Butterworth and 160 kilometres from Ipoh.

The Malaysia first undersea tunnel also planned to be constructed here to shorten the hours for the people to go to Penang and Butterworth. Construction is expected to start in the 2020s.

The Butterworth military airport, RMAF Butterworth, is also found there.
