= Bertam =

State constituency in Penang, Malaysia

Bertam (N02)
Penang constituency

State constituency
- Legislature: Penang State Legislative Assembly
MLA
Reezal Merican Naina Merican
BN
- Constituency abolished: 1974
- First contested: 1974
- Last contested: 2023

Demographics
- Electors (2023): 23,999
- Area (km²): 24

Bertam is a state constituency in Penang, Malaysia, that has been represented in the Penang State Legislative Assembly.

The state constituency was first contested in 1974 and is mandated to return a single Assemblyman to the Penang State Legislative Assembly under the first-past-the-post voting system.

== Definition ==
=== Polling districts ===
According to the federal gazette issued on 30 March 2018, the Bertam constituency is divided into 9 polling districts.

State constituency	Polling districts	Code	Location
Bertam (N02)	Padang Benggali	041/02/01	SA Rakyat Al-Falah Padang Benggali
Bertam (N02)	Permatang Berah	041/02/02	SJK (C) Aik Keow
Bertam (N02)	Permatang Rambai	041/02/03	Al-Madrasatul Ibtidaiyah Permatang Rambai Penaga
Bertam (N02)	Permatang Sintok	041/02/04	SK Permatang Sintok
Bertam (N02)	Permatang Pak Elong	041/03/05	SJK (C) Sin Chung
Bertam (N02)	Permatang Bertam	041/02/06	SK Permatang Bertam
Bertam (N02)	Kepala Batas	041/02/07	SK Hashim Awang
Bertam (N02)	Jalan Kedah	041/02/08	SJK (C) Pei Yu
Bertam (N02)	Pongsu Seribu	041/02/09	SMK Datuk Haji Ahmad Badawi

== Demographics ==
Ethnic breakdown of Bertam's electorate as of 2023
1. Malay (68.9%)
2. Chinese (21.8%)
3. Indian (8.70%)
4. Other ethnicities (0.60%)

Total electors by polling district in 2016
Polling district	Electors
Padang Benggali	752
Permatang Berah	1,421
Permatang Rambai	1,804
Permatang Sintok	979
Permatang Pak Elong	588
Permatang Bertam	2,182
Kepala Batas	886
Jalan Kedah	3,527
Pongsu Seribu	4,482
Total	16,621
Source: Malaysian Election Commission

== History ==
Penang State Legislative Assemblyman for Bertam
Assembly	No	Years	Member	Party
Constituency created from Muda, Tasek Glugor and Kepala Batas
4th	N02	1974–1977	Ahmad Abdullah	BN (UMNO)
4th	N02	1977–1978	Abdul Rahman Abbas	BN (UMNO)
5th	N02	1978–1982	Abdul Rahman Abbas	BN (UMNO)
6th	N02	1982–1986	Abdul Rahman Abbas	BN (UMNO)
7th	N02	1986–1990	Abdul Rahman Abbas	BN (UMNO)
8th	N02	1990–1995	Abdul Rahman Abbas	BN (UMNO)
9th	N02	1995–1999	Hilmi Abdul Rashid	BN (UMNO)
10th	N02	1999–2004	Hilmi Abdul Rashid	BN (UMNO)
11th	N02	2004–2008	Hilmi Abdul Rashid	BN (UMNO)
12th	N02	2008–2013	Zabariah Abdul Wahab	BN (UMNO)
13th	N02	2013–2018	Shariful Azhar Othman	BN (UMNO)
14th	N02	2018–2020	Khaliq Mehtab Mohd Ishaq	PH (BERSATU)
14th	N02	2020–2023	Khaliq Mehtab Mohd Ishaq	PN (BERSATU)
14th	N02	2023	Vacant (Note: Vacant from 6 March 2023 until the 2023 state election due to the incumbent was vacated from his seat in an approved motion in the Penang State Assembly along with 3 other BERSATU assemblymen.)	
15th	N02	2023–present	Reezal Merican Naina Merican	BN (UMNO)

== Election results ==
Penang state election, 2023: Bertam
Party	Candidate	Votes	%	∆%
BN	Reezal Merican Naina Merican	10,453	56.24	▲16.44
PN	Khaliq Mehtab Mohd Ishaq	8,132	43.76	▲43.76
Total valid votes		18,585	100.00	
Total rejected ballots		126		
Unreturned ballots		28		
Turnout		18,739	78.08	▼8.92
Registered electors		23,999		
Majority		2,321	12.48	▲11.08
BN gain from PKR		Swing		?

Penang state election, 2018: Bertam
Party	Candidate	Votes	%	∆%
PKR	Khaliq Mehtab Mohd Ishaq	6,485	41.20	▼3.00
BN	Shariful Azhar Othman	6,268	39.80	▼16.80
PAS	Moktar Ramly	2,986	19.00	▲19.00
Total valid votes		15,739	100.00	
Total rejected ballots		211		
Unreturned ballots		34		
Turnout		15,984	87.00	▼2.20
Registered electors		18,378		
Majority		217	1.40	▼10.20
PKR gain from BN		Swing		?
Source(s) "His Majesty's Government Gazette - Notice of Contested Election, State Legislative Assembly for the State of Penang [P.U. (B) 252/2018]" (PDF). Attorney General's Chambers of Malaysia. 3 May 2018. "Federal Government Gazette - Results of Contested Election and Statements of the Poll after the Official Addition of Votes, State Constituencies for the State of Penang [P.U. (B) 326/2018]" (PDF). Attorney General's Chambers of Malaysia. 28 May 2018. Archived from the original (PDF) on 29 August 2019.

Penang state election, 2013: Bertam
Party	Candidate	Votes	%	∆%
BN	Shariful Azhar Othman	7,939	55.80	▲6.30
PKR	Syed Mikael Rizal Aidid	6,297	44.20	▼6.30
Total valid votes		14,236	100.00	
Total rejected ballots		235		
Unreturned ballots		0		
Turnout		14,471	89.20	▲7.00
Registered electors		16,221		
Majority		1,642	11.60	▼12.60
BN hold		Swing		
Source(s) "Federal Government Gazette - Notice of Contested Election, State Legislative Assembly for the State of Penang [P.U. (B) 189/2013]" (PDF). Attorney General's Chambers of Malaysia. 26 April 2013. "Federal Government Gazette - Results of Contested Election and Statements of the Poll after the Official Addition of Votes, State Constituencies for the State of Penang [P.U. (B) 230/2013]" (PDF). Attorney General's Chambers of Malaysia. 22 May 2013. Archived from the original (PDF) on 22 March 2019.

Penang state election, 2008: Bertam
Party	Candidate	Votes	%	∆%
BN	Zabariah Abdul Wahab	6,794	62.10	▼14.32
PKR	Noorsiah Ashad	4,142	37.90	▲14.32
Total valid votes		10,936	100.00	
Total rejected ballots		261		
Unreturned ballots		36		
Turnout		11,233	82.20	▲0.26
Registered electors		13,660		
Majority		2,652	24.20	▼28.64
BN hold		Swing		

Penang state election, 2004: Bertam
Party	Candidate	Votes	%	∆%
BN	Hilmi Abdul Rashid	7,615	76.42	▲4.69
PKR	Mahamad Rashim	2,350	23.58	▼4.69
Total valid votes		9,965	100.00	
Total rejected ballots		193		
Unreturned ballots		1		
Turnout		10,159	81.94	▲2.66
Registered electors		12,398		
Majority		5,265	52.84	▲9.38
BN hold		Swing		

Penang state election, 1999: Bertam
Party	Candidate	Votes	%	∆%
BN	Hilmi Abdul Rashid	6,256	71.73	▼12.63
PKR	Md Ariffin Mas Nayeem	2,466	28.27	▲28.27
Total valid votes		8,722	100.00	
Total rejected ballots		251		
Unreturned ballots		0		
Turnout		8,973	79.28	▲8.19
Registered electors		11,318		
Majority		3,790	43.46	▼25.26
BN hold		Swing		

Penang state election, 1995: Bertam
Party	Candidate	Votes	%	∆%
BN	Hilmi Abdul Rashid	6,632	84.36	▲15.16
S46	Jamilah Khaton Zainal Abidin	1,230	15.64	▼15.16
Total valid votes		7,860	100.00	
Total rejected ballots		215		
Unreturned ballots		5		
Turnout		8,082	71.09	▼7.59
Registered electors		11,369		
Majority		5,402	68.72	▲31.32
BN hold		Swing		

Penang state election, 1990: Bertam
Party	Candidate	Votes	%	∆%
BN	Abdul Rahman Abbas	7,306	69.20	▼1.52
S46	Mohd. Nor Samad	3,252	31.80	▲31.80
Total valid votes		10,558	100.00	
Total rejected ballots		342		
Unreturned ballots		0		
Turnout		10,900	78.68	▲4.87
Registered electors		13,854		
Majority		4,054	37.40	▼4.04
BN hold		Swing		

Penang state election, 1986: Bertam
Party	Candidate	Votes	%	∆%
BN	Abdul Rahman Abbas	6,776	70.72	▲1.69
PAS	Md Jamil Abd Rahman	2,806	29.28	▲16.61
Total valid votes		9,582	100.00	
Total rejected ballots		301		
Unreturned ballots		0		
Turnout		9,883	73.81	▼5.89
Registered electors		13,390		
Majority		3,970	41.44	▼9.29
BN hold		Swing		

Penang state election, 1982: Bertam
Party	Candidate	Votes	%	∆%
BN	Abdul Rahman Abbas	5,568	69.03	▲7.59
DAP	Khoo Soo Hoe	1,476	18.30	▲18.30
PAS	Md Jamil Abd Rahman	1,022	12.67	▼25.89
Total valid votes		8,066	100.00	
Total rejected ballots		178		
Unreturned ballots		0		
Turnout		8,244	79.70	▲4.09
Registered electors		10,344		
Majority		4,092	50.73	▲27.85
BN hold		Swing		

Penang state election, 1978: Bertam
Party	Candidate	Votes	%	∆%
BN	Abdul Rahman Abbas	3,645	61.44	▲61.44
PAS	Said Taib	2,288	38.56	▲38.56
Total valid votes		5,933	100.00	
Total rejected ballots		430		
Unreturned ballots		0		
Turnout		6,363	75.61	
Registered electors		8,415		
Majority		1,357	22.88	
BN hold		Swing		

Penang state by-election, 16 June 1977: Bertam Upon the death of the incumbent, Ahmad Abdullah
Party	Candidate	Votes	%	∆%
On the nomination day, Abdul Rahman Abbas won uncontested.
BN	Abdul Rahman Abbas			
Total valid votes				
Total rejected ballots				
Unreturned ballots				
Turnout				
Registered electors		0		
Majority				
BN hold		Swing		

Penang state election, 1974: Bertam
Party	Candidate	Votes	%
On Nomination Day, Ahmad Abdullah won uncontested.
BN	Ahmad Abdullah		
Total valid votes			100.00
Total rejected ballots			
Unreturned ballots			
Turnout			
Registered electors		7,076	
Majority			
This was a new constituency created.

== See also ==
- Constituencies of Penang
