= List of cities in Malaysia =

In Malaysia, cities (Malay: bandaraya) are officially designated under the governance of city councils (Malay: Majlis bandaraya), although there are several exceptions. As of 2024, 20 areas in the country are officially termed cities by law. Among them, 16 are from Peninsular Malaysia, while 3 are from East Malaysia. George Town, the capital city of Penang, was declared a city on 1 January 1957 by Elizabeth II, Queen of the United Kingdom, making it the first city in the country, and the only city declared before Malayan independence. George Town remained the sole city of Malaya until 1963, when Singapore was formally incorporated into Malaysia. However, Singapore's expulsion in 1965 meant that George Town would remain Malaysia's only city until Kuala Lumpur's declaration as a city in 1972, by Abdul Halim of Kedah, the fifth Yang di-Pertuan Agong of Malaysia. In 1988, Kuching was chartered as the first city in East Malaysia. Klang is the most recent municipality in the country declared a city, doing so on 5 February 2024.

There are also highly urbanised and populated areas across the country that did not attain city status, but are sometimes referred as cities. Officially, these areas are classified as municipalities or townships.

== Cities in Malaysia ==
=== Current cities ===
General information			Administrative				Notes
Name	Image	State	Local governments		Date of declaration	Pop.	Notes
Name	Image	State	Flag	Seal	Date of declaration	Pop.	Notes
George Town; City of Penang Island; Bandaraya Pulau Pinang		Penang: Northeast District (since 1957); Southwest District (since 2015)	Penang Island City Council; Majlis Bandaraya Pulau Pinang		1 January 1957 by Elizabeth II, Queen of the United Kingdom, as the City of George Town 31 March 2015 by Abdul Halim of Kedah, Yang di-Pertuan Agong XIV, as the City of Penang Island	794,313	
Kuala Lumpur; Federal Territories of Kuala Lumpur; Wilayah Persekutuan Kuala Lumpur		Selangor: Kuala Lumpur District (1972–1974); Federal Territories: Federal Territory of Kuala Lumpur (since 1974)	Kuala Lumpur City Hall; Dewan Bandaraya Kuala Lumpur		1 February 1972 by Abdul Halim of Kedah, Yang di-Pertuan Agong V, as the City of Kuala Lumpur	1,982,112	
Ipoh; City of Ipoh; Bandaraya Ipoh		Perak: Kinta District	Ipoh City Council; Majlis Bandaraya Ipoh		27 May 1988 by Azlan Shah of Perak, 34th Sultan of Perak, as the City of Ipoh	759,952	
Kuching; City of Kuching; Bandaraya Kuching		Sarawak: Kuching Division	Commission of Kuching; North City Hall; Suruhanjaya Dewan Bandaraya Kuching Utara		1 August 1988 by Iskandar of Johor, Yang di-Pertuan Agong VIII, as the City of Kuching	349,147	
Kuching; City of Kuching; Bandaraya Kuching		Sarawak: Kuching Division	–		1 August 1988 by Iskandar of Johor, Yang di-Pertuan Agong VIII, as the City of Kuching	349,147	
Kuching; City of Kuching; Bandaraya Kuching		Sarawak: Kuching Division	Council of the City of Kuching South; Majlis Bandaraya Kuching Selatan		1 August 1988 by Iskandar of Johor, Yang di-Pertuan Agong VIII, as the City of Kuching	349,147	
Kuching; City of Kuching; Bandaraya Kuching		Sarawak: Kuching Division	–		1 August 1988 by Iskandar of Johor, Yang di-Pertuan Agong VIII, as the City of Kuching	349,147	
Johor Bahru; City of Johor Bahru; Bandaraya Johor Bahru		Johor: Johor Bahru District	Johor Bahru City Council; Majlis Bandaraya Johor Bahru		1 January 1994 by Iskandar of Johor, 24th Sultan of Johor, as the City of Johor Bahru	858,118	
Putrajaya; Federal Territory of Putrajaya; Wilayah Persekutuan Putrajaya		Federal Territories: Federal Territory of Putrajaya	Putrajaya Corporation; Perbadanan Putrajaya		1 October 1995 by Ja'afar of Negeri Sembilan, Yang di-Pertuan Agong X, as the Federal Territory of Putrajaya	109,202	
Kota Kinabalu; City of Kota Kinabalu; Bandaraya Kota Kinabalu		Sabah: West Coast Division	Kota Kinabalu City Hall; Dewan Bandaraya Kota Kinabalu		2 February 2000 by Salahuddin of Selangor, Yang di-Pertuan Agong XI, as the City of Kota Kinabalu	500,425	
Shah Alam; City of Shah Alam; Bandaraya Shah Alam		Selangor: Petaling District	Shah Alam City Council; Majlis Bandaraya Shah Alam		10 October 2000 by Salahuddin of Selangor, Yang di-Pertuan Agong XI, as the City of Shah Alam	812,327	
Malacca City; City of Malacca; Bandaraya Melaka		Malacca: Melaka Tengah District	Malacca City Council; Majlis Bandaraya Melaka		15 April 2003 by Sirajuddin of Perlis, Yang di-Pertuan Agong XII, as the City of Malacca	453,904	
Malacca City; City of Malacca; Bandaraya Melaka		Malacca: Melaka Tengah District	–		15 April 2003 by Sirajuddin of Perlis, Yang di-Pertuan Agong XII, as the City of Malacca	453,904	
Alor Setar; City of Alor Setar; Bandaraya Alor Setar		Kedah: Kota Setar District	Alor Setar City Council; Majlis Bandaraya Alor Setar		21 December 2003 by Sirajuddin of Perlis, Yang di-Pertuan Agong XII, as the City of Alor Setar	423,868	
Miri; City of Miri; Bandaraya Miri		Sarawak: Miri Division	Miri City Council; Majlis Bandaraya Miri		20 May 2005 by Abang Muhammad Salahuddin, 6th Governor of Sarawak, as the City of Miri	248,877	
Miri; City of Miri; Bandaraya Miri		Sarawak: Miri Division	–		20 May 2005 by Abang Muhammad Salahuddin, 6th Governor of Sarawak, as the City of Miri	248,877	
Petaling Jaya; City of Petaling Jaya; Bandaraya Petaling Jaya		Selangor: Petaling District	Petaling Jaya City Council; Majlis Bandaraya Petaling Jaya		20 June 2006 by Sharafuddin of Selangor, 9th Sultan of Selangor, as the City of Petaling Jaya	771,687	
Petaling Jaya; City of Petaling Jaya; Bandaraya Petaling Jaya		Selangor: Petaling District	–		20 June 2006 by Sharafuddin of Selangor, 9th Sultan of Selangor, as the City of Petaling Jaya	771,687	
Kuala Terengganu; City of Kuala Terengganu; Bandaraya Kuala Terengganu		Terengganu: Kuala Terengganu District; Kuala Nerus District (since 2014)	Kuala Terengganu City Council; Majlis Bandaraya Kuala Terengganu		1 January 2008 by Tengku Muhammad Ismail, Crown Prince of Terengganu, as the City of Kuala Terengganu	375,424	
Iskandar Puteri; City of Iskandar Puteri; Bandaraya Iskandar Puteri		Johor: Johor Bahru District	Iskandar Puteri City Council; Majlis Bandaraya Iskandar Puteri		22 November 2017 by Ibrahim Ismail of Johor, 25th Sultan of Johor, as the City of Iskandar Puteri	575,977	
Iskandar Puteri; City of Iskandar Puteri; Bandaraya Iskandar Puteri		Johor: Johor Bahru District	–		22 November 2017 by Ibrahim Ismail of Johor, 25th Sultan of Johor, as the City of Iskandar Puteri	575,977	
Seberang Perai; City of Seberang Perai; Bandaraya Seberang Perai		Penang: North Seberang Perai District; Central Seberang Perai District; South Seberang Perai District	Seberang Perai City Council; Majlis Bandaraya Seberang Perai		16 September 2019 by Abdul Rahman Abbas, 7th Governor of Penang, as the City of Seberang Perai	946,092	
Seremban; City of Seremban; Bandaraya Seremban		Negeri Sembilan: Seremban District	Seremban City Council; Majlis Bandaraya Seremban		1 January 2020 by Muhriz of Negeri Sembilan, 11th Yamtuan Besar, as the City of Seremban	681,541	
Subang Jaya; City of Subang Jaya; Bandaraya Subang Jaya		Selangor: Petaling District	Subang Jaya City Council; Majlis Bandaraya Subang Jaya		20 October 2020 by Sharafuddin of Selangor, 9th Sultan of Selangor, as the City of Subang Jaya	902,086	
Pasir Gudang; City of Pasir Gudang; Bandaraya Pasir Gudang		Johor: Johor Bahru District	Pasir Gudang City Council; Majlis Bandaraya Pasir Gudang		22 November 2020 by Ibrahim Ismail of Johor, 25th Sultan of Johor, as the City of Pasir Gudang	312,437	
Kuantan; City of Kuantan; Bandaraya Kuantan		Pahang: Kuantan District	Kuantan City Council; Majlis Bandaraya Kuantan		21 February 2021 by Abdullah of Pahang, Yang di-Pertuan Agong XVI, as the City of Kuantan	548,014	
Kuantan; City of Kuantan; Bandaraya Kuantan		Pahang: Kuantan District	–		21 February 2021 by Abdullah of Pahang, Yang di-Pertuan Agong XVI, as the City of Kuantan	548,014	
Klang; Royal City of Klang; Bandaraya Diraja Klang		Selangor: Klang District	Klang Royal City Council; Majlis Bandaraya Diraja Klang		5 February 2024 by Sharafuddin of Selangor, 9th Sultan of Selangor, as the Royal City of Klang	902,025	
Klang; Royal City of Klang; Bandaraya Diraja Klang		Selangor: Klang District	–		5 February 2024 by Sharafuddin of Selangor, 9th Sultan of Selangor, as the Royal City of Klang	902,025	

=== Former cities ===
General information			Administrative				Notes
Name	Image	State	Local governments		Date of declaration	Date of abolishment	Notes
Name	Image	State	Flag	Seal	Date of declaration	Date of abolishment	Notes
Singapore; City of Singapore; Bandaraya Singapura		State of Singapore: Central Area (1951–1965)	City Council of Singapore; Majlis Bandaraya Singapura		22 September 1951 by George VI, King of the United Kingdom, as the City of Singapore	9 August 1965 (expelled from Malaysia)	
Singapore; City of Singapore; Bandaraya Singapura		State of Singapore: Central Area (1951–1965)	–	–	22 September 1951 by George VI, King of the United Kingdom, as the City of Singapore	9 August 1965 (expelled from Malaysia)	

== History ==
=== Penang ===
George Town became a city on 1 January 1957 by a royal charter granted by Her Majesty Queen Elizabeth II, becoming the first town in the Federation of Malaya to become a city (Singapore became a city in 1951). The royal charter stated that:

... the said Municipality of George Town shall on the First Day of January in the year of Our Lord One thousand nine hundred and fifty-seven and forever after that be a city and shall be called and styled the CITY OF GEORGE TOWN instead of the Municipality of George Town and shall thenceforth have all such rank, liberties, privileges and immunities as are incident to a City.

However, local government elections were abolished by the federal government in 1965, and the functions of the City Council were transferred to the Chief Minister of Penang in 1966. A Municipal Council for the whole of Penang Island, the Penang Island Municipal Council, was set up between 1974 and 1976.

Although the city status of George Town was never officially revoked, George Town's existence as a corporate entity was in doubt, let alone as a city. This is similar to the position of the former city of Rochester in England, the site of England's second-oldest cathedral, which had been a city from 1211 until 1998 when it was merged with a neighbouring borough. As the new council was not granted city status, and the city, through oversight, failed to appoint charter trustees to inherit the city charter, the city ceased to exist.

Most residents disagreed with this view and held that as George Town's city status has never been revoked, it remains a city to this day. According to lawyer Datuk Anwar Fazal, George Town "legally has been and is still a city because the City of George Town Ordinance 1957 had not been repealed".^{[3]} As city status is a matter of law, the actual legal position will depend on an analysis of the City Council of Penang (Transfer of Functions) Order 1966 and the Local Government Act 1976.

On 1 January 2015, the Malaysian federal government upgraded the Penang Island Municipal Council into the present-day Penang Island City Council, thereby expanding the city limit of George Town to encompass the entirety of Penang Island, as well as a handful of surrounding islets.

=== Subsequent cities ===
The royal charters for Kuala Lumpur, Kuching, Kota Kinabalu, Shah Alam, Malacca City, Alor Setar and Miri were from the Malaysian head of state, the Yang di-Pertuan Agong, while Ipoh, Johor Bahru, Iskandar Puteri and Subang Jaya were granted by their respective state sultans.

Kuala Lumpur, the largest city, is the national capital and a federal territory, but as of 2012, most government ministries have relocated to the new administrative capital of Putrajaya.

=== Criteria ===
Local governments or local authorities in Malaysia (Malay: pihak berkuasa tempatan, abbreviated PBT) are placed under the jurisdiction of their respective state governments. On the other hand, the Ministry of Housing and Local Government (Malay: Kementerian Perumahan dan Kerajaan Tempatan, abbreviated as KPKT) handles the classification and standardisation of local governments while providing them with consultation services (i.e. technical consultancy and federal funding). For the Federal Territories, their respective local governments are monitored by the Ministry of Federal Territories and Urban Wellbeing (Malay: Kementerian Wilayah Persekutuan, abbreviated KWP). The National Council of Local Governments (Malay: Majlis Negara Kerajaan Tempatan, abbreviated as MNKT), formed in 1960 by the federal government, is tasked on handling policies and laws related to local governments.

KPKT formally classifies local governments in three different categories: city councils, municipal councils, and district councils, with exceptions equivalent to the three respective categories. These categories are separated by certain requirements related to urban population, finances, and infrastructural developments. The 60th meeting of the MNKT, held on 3 June 2008, approved updated criterion on the selection process for the granting of city status on a local government:

1. The local government must administer a region that is an administrative centre of a state;
2. The region must have a population of more than 500-thousand people;
3. The local government must be financially sustainable, with an annual income of not less than 100-million ringgit, and has the ability to afford stable administrative expenditures;
4. The local government must have an efficient bureaucratic structure, while maintaining public services at the highest-level, e.g. tax collection, development approvals, legal enforcement, and other necessary functions;
5. Urban developments planned by the local government should be sustainable;
6. The local government should give further emphasis on resolving social issues, i.e. squatting, pollution, safety, affordable housing, and environmental conservation. Studies conducted by the Malaysian Urban Indicators Network (MURNInet) would also be taken account of.
7. The local government must promote an urban image that is applicable towards the national identity as a representation of the country's heritage, and preserve any local objects or places of historical, cultural, or artistic significance;
8. The region must contain adequate resources and institutions of finance and industry to easily facilitate trade and foreign investments;
9. The region must be a local hub of education, complete with universities, colleges, museums and public libraries;
10. The region must be a centre of culture, sports, and recreation;
11. The local government should have the ability to host conventions of national and international level;
12. The infrastructure of the region should be complete, with sufficient public utilities (e.g. disabled-persons friendly-public parks, public transportation, traffic management systems, road networks, computer services), and;
13. The region must achieve nationwide or international recognition equivalent to those of other cities worldwide.

== Locations of cities ==
Locations of cities in Malaysia

== Population ==
Kuala Lumpur –the capital city of Malaysia– is by far the largest municipality in the country. This is followed by Kajang, which is the second largest municipality in Malaysia. Other prominent municipalities include Seberang Perai, Subang Jaya, Klang, and Johor Bahru, which is the largest state capital city in Malaysia.

The following table shows the largest municipalities by population in Malaysia.

Largest cities and municipalities in Malaysia Department of Statistics, Malaysia (2020)
Rank	Name	State	Pop.	Rank	Name	State	Pop.
1	Kuala Lumpur	Federal Territory	1,982,112	11	Ipoh	Perak	759,952
2	Kajang	Selangor	1,047,356	12	Seremban	Negeri Sembilan	681,541
3	Seberang Perai	Penang	946,092	13	Iskandar Puteri	Johor	575,977
4	Subang Jaya	Selangor	902,086	14	Kuantan	Pahang	548,014
5	Klang	Selangor	902,025	15	Sungai Petani	Kedah	545,053
6	Johor Bahru	Johor	858,118	16	Ampang Jaya	Selangor	531,904
7	Shah Alam	Selangor	812,327	17	Kota Kinabalu	Sabah	500,425
8	George Town	Penang	794,313	18	Malacca City	Malacca	453,904
9	Petaling Jaya	Selangor	771,687	19	Sandakan	Sabah	439,050
10	Selayang	Selangor	764,327	20	Alor Setar	Kedah	423,868

== See also ==
- List of cities and towns in Malaysia by population
- List of local governments in Malaysia
- List of capitals in Malaysia
