= North Seberang Perai District =

District in Seberang Perai, Penang, Malaysia

- District of Penang
- Daerah Seberang Perai Utara
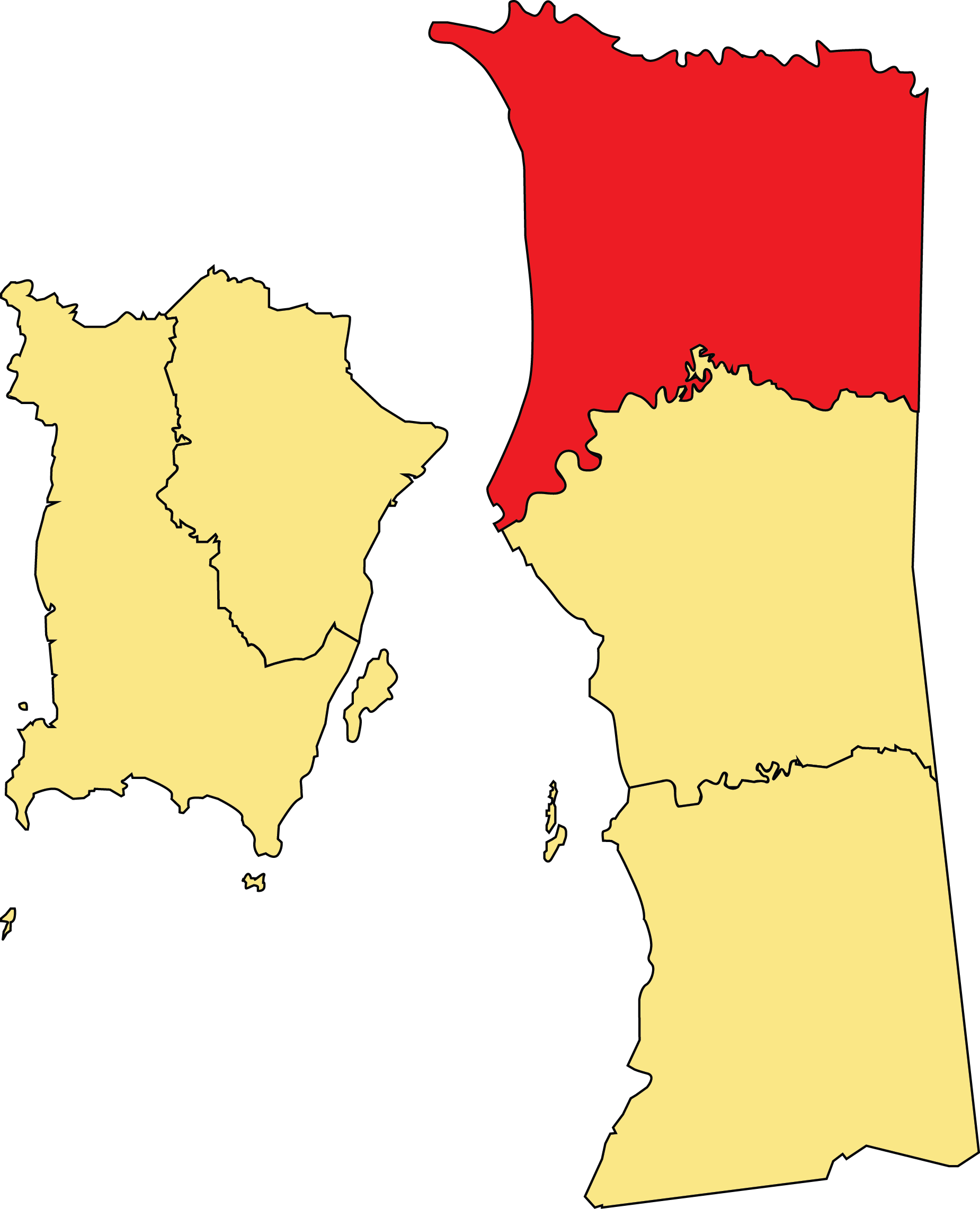
- North Seberang Perai within Penang
- Country: Malaysia
- State: Penang
- City: Seberang Perai
- Seat: Kepala Batas

Government
  - Local government: Seberang Perai City Council

Area
  - Total: 268.7 km^{2} (103.7 sq mi)

Population (2020)
  - Total: 339,095
  - Density: 1,262/km^{2} (3,270/sq mi)
- Postal code: 120xx–138xx
- Website: portalpdt.penang.gov.my/index.php/ms/services/daerah-seberang-perai-utara-new-3

The North Seberang Perai District is a district in Seberang Perai within the Malaysian state of Penang. The district covers the northern third of Seberang Perai, including the city centre of Butterworth. It borders Kedah to the north and east, and Central Seberang Perai to the south. The district, along with the Central and South Seberang Perai districts, falls under the jurisdiction of the Seberang Perai City Council.

== Administrative divisions ==
The North Seberang Perai District is further divided into 17 subdivisions, officially known as mukims.

Population density by subdivisions in Northern Seberang Perai
Subdivision	Population (2020)	Area (km^{2})	Population density (/km^{2})
Mukim 1	8,430	9.1	926
Mukim 2	6,464	16.4	394
Mukim 3	10,288	26.6	387
Mukim 4	13,366	10.5	1,273
Mukim 5	8,357	18	464
Mukim 6	53,069	39	1,361
Mukim 7	21,202	12.5	1,696
Mukim 8	18,035	12.4	1,454
Mukim 9	12,376	7.2	1,719
Mukim 10	4,746	10.8	439
Mukim 11	22,153	15.6	1,420
Mukim 12	31,160	38	820
Mukim 13	10,692	28	382
Mukim 14	21,938	2.9	7,565
Mukim 16	16,080	6.9	2,330
Butterworth	80,378	14.6	5,505
Kepala Batas	361	0.2	1,805

== See also ==
- Northeast Penang Island District
- Southwest Penang Island District
