= List of Hindu temples in Malaysia =

This is a list of Hindu temples in Malaysia.

== Federal territories ==
=== Kuala Lumpur ===
- Sri Kshemankhari Durgai Amman Alayam, Taman Kepong Baru Tambahan (Mr. Keshwean Nair - Founder, President and Senior Spiritual Advisor)
- Sri Navagraha Nayagi Durgai Amman Alayam – Kepong, Taman Sri Sinar
- Sri Veera Muniswarar Alayam, Batu 5, Jalan Ipoh
- Sri Paranjothi Vinayagar Temple, Jalan Ipoh
- Sri Maha Mariamman Temple, Jalan Tun H. S. Lee
- Sri Ganesar Aalayam, Kampong Pandan
- Sri Aiynareeswarar Temple, Taman Melawati, Setapak
- Sri Maha Mariamman Temple, Sri Segambut, Taman Cuepecs
- Sri Karumariamman Temple, Jalan Sentul
- Sri Nageswary Amman Temple, Bangsar
- Sri Maha Kaliamman Temple, Jalan Kasipillay, Jalan Ipoh
- Sri Kamakshi Ambal Alayam, Jalan Bukit Bangsar Off Lorong Maarof, Bangsar
- Sri Arulmigu Devi Sri Raja Kaliamman Kovil, Brickfields
- Angkasapuri Sri Maha Kaliamman Alayam
- Kuil Sri Kamatchi Amman Aalayam, Jalan Perkasa Satu, Taman Maluri, Cheras
- Sri Thohaiyadi Vinayagar Kovil, Jalan Cheras
- Sri Kandaswamy Kovil – Scott Road, Brickfields
- Sri Maha Eeswaran Temple – Kg. Bumi Hijau, Setapak
- Sri Kottumalai Pillayar Temple – Pudu
- Sri Thandayuthapani Temple, Jalan Ipoh
- Sri Muneeswarar Temple – 60 Jalan Perkasa, Kampung Pandan
- Sri Shakti Vinayagar Temple – Brickfields
- Sree Veera Hanuman Temple – Scott Road, Brickfields
- Sri Sakthi Maha Mariamman Alayam – Jalan Robson Off Jalan Seputeh, Brickfields
- Sri Sidthi Vinayagar Kovil Paripalana Sangam – Jalan Brunei
- Kuil Sri Maha Muneswarar – Jalan Scott, Brickfields
- Kuil Sri Krishna Temple, Jalan Scott, Brickfields
- Murugan Temple, Jalan Tebing, Brickfields
- Arulmigu Kailayanaathar Sivan Temple – Pangkalan TUDM, Sg Besi
- Sri Laxmi Narayan Mandir, Jalan Kasipillay, off Jalan Ipoh
- Arulmigu Muneeswarar Thirukovil, Jalan Seberau, Batu 4 Cheras
- Sri Muthumariamman Temple, Setapak, Air Panas
- Om Sri Maha Kaliamman Alayam, Jalan Berhala, Brickfields
- Sri Maha Mariamman Alayam Bukit Kiara, TTDI
- Ahthi Eeswaran Templ, Sentul
- Om Jay Maha Muni Pathie Amma Alayam - Segambut
- Dewi Sri Pathra Kaliamman, Jalan Masjid India
- Om Sri Maha Veera Jada Muniswaran Aalaya, Jalan E3/1, Taman Ehsan, Kepong
- Sri Arulmighu Maha Kaliamman Alayam, Bandar Baru Sentul
- Sri Maha Veera Muniswarar Alayam, Jalan Ang Seng, Brickfields
- Shree Durga Devi, Gurkha Mandhir, Kampung Batu Muda, Jalan Ipoh
- Pertubuhan Persatuan Kovil Sri Maha Munesswarar Lorong Raja Muda Abdul Aziz
- Muniswaran Temple, Pusat Latihan Polis, Jalan Sultan Yahya Petra

== West Malaysia ==
=== Perlis ===
- Arau Muniswaran Temple, Arau (அரவு முனீஸ்வரன் கோவில்)
- Arulmigu Arumugaswamy Dhevasthanam, Pusat Bandar Kangar, Kangar ( அருள்மிகு ஆறுமுக சுவாமி தேவஸ்தானம்/Kangar Hindu Temple)
- Kuil Sri Maha Veera Kaliamman, Kampung Bukit Lagi, Kangar (குயில் ஸ்ரீ மகா வீர காளியம்மன்)
- Kuil Sree Veera Maha Batra Kali Amman, Pauh, Arau (கோயில் ஸ்ரீ வீர மகா பத்ர காளி அம்மன்)
- Kuil Sri Muniswarar, Kampung Kolam, Padang Besar (ஸ்ரீ முனீஸ்வரர் கோவில்)
- Sri Kamatchi Amman Koil, Stesen keretapi Padang Besar, Padang Besar (ஸ்ரீ காமாட்சி அம்மன் கோயில்)
- Sri Maha Mariamman Devasthana Sabha Temple, Jalan Besar Pauh, Arau (ஸ்ரீ மகா மாரியம்மன் தேவஸ்தான சபை ஆலயம்)
- Sri Maha Muniswara Aalayam, Taman Pangkalan Asam, Kangar (ஸ்ரீ மஹா முனீஸ்வரர் ஆலயம்)
- Sri Kaliammaa Temple, Padang Besar (ஸ்ரீ காளியம்மன் கோயில்)
- Sri Maha Muniswarar Alayam, Kaki Bukit, Padang Besar (ஸ்ரீ மகா முனீஸ்வரர் ஆலயம்)

=== Kedah ===
- Sri Ruthra Veeramuthu Maha Mariamman Devasthanam (U. P.), Sungai Petani
- Sri Thandayuthabany Nattukottai Chettiar Temple, Jalan Tunku Putra, Kulim
- Sri Maha Karumariamman Thirukkovil Taman Permaipura (Riverside), Bedong
- Sri Thandayuthapani Kovil, Alor Setar
- Sri Maha Mariamman Devasthanam, Alor Setar
- Sri Maha Mariamman Devasthanam, Pokok Sena
- Sri Maha Mariamman Temple, Sungai Petani
- Sri Subramaniyar Temple, Sungai Petani
- Sri Agasa Mariamman Devasthanam, Anak Bukit
- Sri Sithi Vinayagar Temple, Sungai Petani
- Sri Siddhi Vinayagar Temple, Bedong
- Harvard Div 1 Sri Muthu Mariamman Temple, Bedong
- Sri Maha Mariamman Devasthanam, Sungai Tok Pawang, Bedong
- Sri Arasa Maratthu Mariamman Kovil, Sungai Tok Pawang
- Sri Muniswarar Alayam, Central Kedah, Sungai Tok Pawang
- Sri Subramaniam Devasthanam, Baling
- Sri Shivasakthi Alayam, Sungai Petani
- Sri Thurgaiamman Temple, Sungai Petani
- Shirdi Baba Center, Sungai Petani
- Sri Muniswarar Temple, Sungai Petani
- Nandi Asramam Temple, Sungai Petani
- Sri Aiyanar Alayam, Sungai Tukang, Sungai Petani
- Sri Maha Mariamman Devastanam, Batu 2, Jalan Kuala Ketil, Sungai Petani
- Sri Maha Mariamman Kampung Air Hitam, Serdang
- Arulmigu Sri Siva Muniswarar Alayam Air Merah, Kulim
- Sri Pathinettam Padi Iyappan, Kg. Paya Besar, Paya Besar, Lunas
- Sri Amirtheswary Sametha Chandramowlisvarar Temple, Kg. Paya Besar, Lunas
- Sri Bhagavathi Amman Alayam, Paya Besar
- Sri Sivasakthi Muniswarar alayam, Batu Putih, Karangan
- Sri Subramaniam Devastanam, Serdang
- Arulmigu Annai Karumariamman Alayam, Paya Besar, Lunas
- Sri Thulasi Amman Devastaanam, Jalan Nuri, Sungai Petani
- Sree Mutu Mariamman Temple, Lunas
- Sri Maha Mariamman Temple, Ladang Lubok Segintah, Kuala Ketil, Bukit Selambau
- Sri Ramar Temple, Sungai Batu Estate, Taman Lembah Bujang, Bedong
- Arulmigu Sri Maha Karumariamman Alayam, Kampung Permatang Samak, Bedong
- Arulmigu Devi Nageshwari Amman Temple.Pokok Sena Kedah .

=== Penang ===
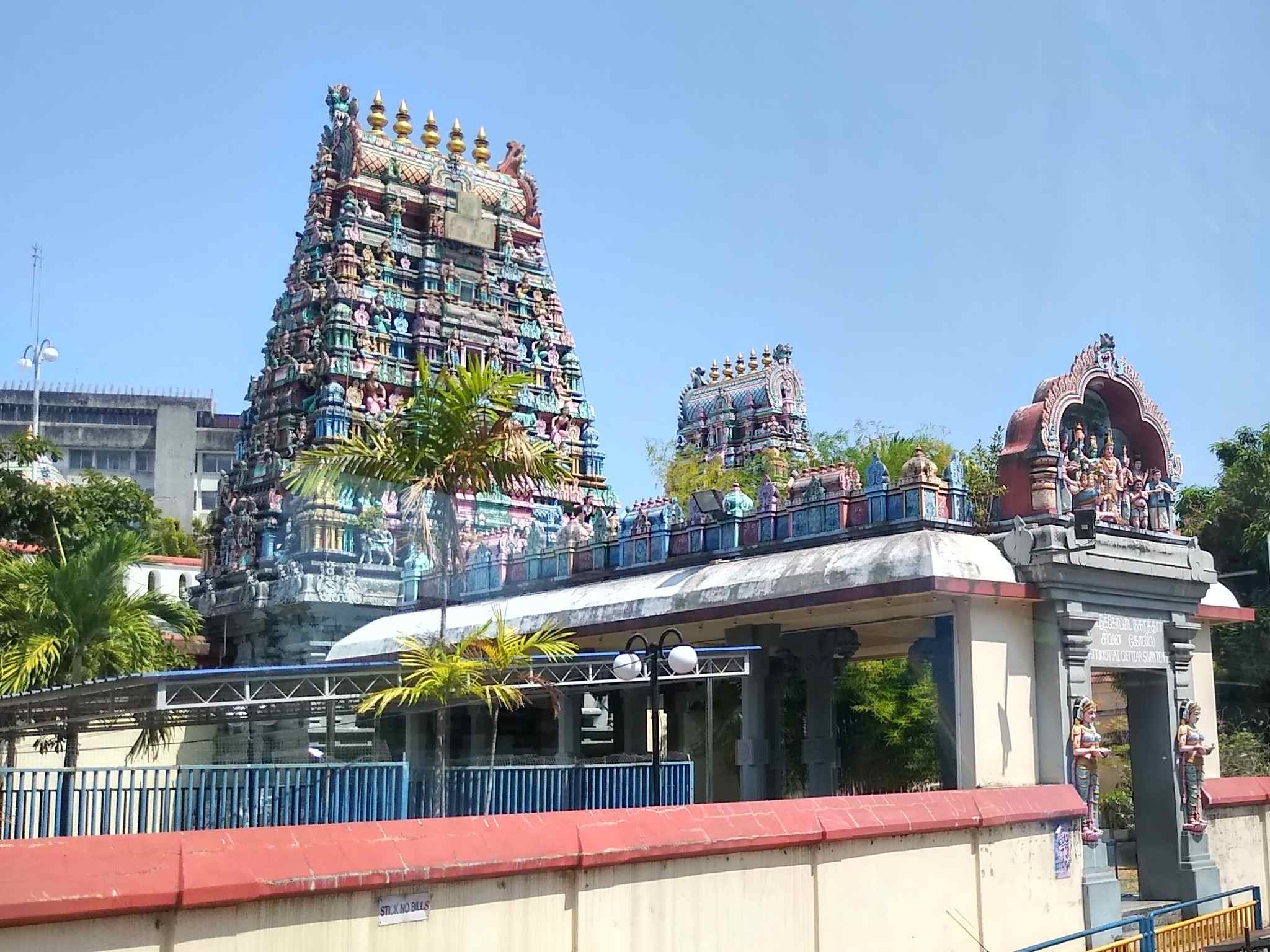
Nagarathar Sivan Temple, George Town

- Arulmigu Balathandayuthapani Temple, Penang, George Town
- Arulmigu Sri Maha Mariamman Temple, George Town
- Arulmigu Ganesar Temple, Jalan Air Terjun (Waterfall Road), George Town
- Nattukkottai Chettiar Temple, Penang, George Town
- Kovil Arulmigu Devi Sri Kaliamman Temple, Permatang Sintok, Penaga
- Kovil Sri Gangatharan Shiva Peruman, Butterworth
- Sri Meenakshi Sundaraeswarar Temple, Jalan Air Terjun (Waterfall Road), George Town
- Sri Muneeswaran Temple, Jalan Air Terjun (Waterfall Road), George Town
- Sri Kunj Bihari Temple, George Town
- Nagarathar Sivan Temple, Jalan Dato Keramat, George Town
- Sri Kamatchi Amman Temple, Jalan Dato Keramat, George Town
- Sri Raja Mariamman Temple, Jalan Kampung Jawa Baru, George Town
- Sri Poongka Munneswarar Temple, Jalan Kampung Jawa Baru, George Town
- Sri Madurai Veeran Temple, Jalan Timah, George Town
- Sri Kamatchi Amman Temple, Jalan Sungai Pinang, George Town
- Sri Muniswarar Temple, Jalan Jkr, Sungai Pinang, George Town
- Sri Balamurugar Temple, Jalan Kajang, George Town
- Sri Muthu Mariamman Temple, Lorong Kulit, George Town
- Sri Karumariamman Temple, Dhoby Ghaut, George Town
- Sri Ramar Temple, Solok York, George Town
- Sri Muthu Mariamman Temple, Solok York, George Town
- Sri Aatrangkarai Vinayagar Temple, Solok York, George Town
- Sri Jadamuneeswarar Temple, Solok York, George Town
- Sti Throubathai Amman Temple, Solok York, George Town
- Sri Sivasakthi Amman Temple, Jalan Air Itam, George Town
- Sri Ambakarathoor Pathrakaliamman Temple, Jalan Air Itam, George Town
- Sri Rudra Veera Muthu Maha Mariamman Temple, Jalan Air Itam, George Town
- Sri Maha Muneeswarar Temple, Jalan Pokok Cherry, George Town
- Sri Aruloli Thirumurugan Temple, Bukit Bendera, George Town
- Sri Rokku Malai Muneeswarar Temple, Paya Terubong, George Town
- Sri Sivasakthi Aiyappar Temple, Jalan Mount Erskine, George Town
- Sri Sakthi Vinayagar Temple, Jalan Fettes, Tanjung Tokong, George Town
- Sri Maha Mariamman Temple, Tanjung Bunga, George Town
- Sri Kadalora Kaliamman Temple, Tanjung Bunga, George Town
- Sri Singamuga Kaliamman Temple, Teluk Bahang
- Sri Munesswaran Temple, Teluk Bahang
- Shree Maha Letchumi Temple, Macallum Street, Georgetown
- Sri Muthu Mariamman Thandayuthapani Temple, Balik Pulau
- Sri Manalmedu Muthu Mariamman Temple, Balik Pulau
- Sri Muthu Mariamman Muneeswarar Temple, Bayan Lepas
- Sri Visvanathar Visalatchi Temple, Jalan Tokong Ular, Bayan Baru
- Sri Veera Kaliamman Temple, Batu Uban, George Town
- Sri Krishnar Temple, Sungai Dua, George Town
- Sri Veera Makaliamman Temple, Gelugor, George Town
- Sri Muneeswarar Temple, Jalan Tengku Kudin (Udini Road), George Town
- Sri Aathi Baghavathi Temple, Bukit Gelugur, George Town
- Sri Ragunatha Swami Madalayam, Bukit Gelugur, George Town
- Sri Veera Makaliamman Temple, Lorong Ipoh, Jelutong, George Town
- Sri Vazhividum Murugar Temple, Jalan Gurdwara, George Town
- Sri Ashtambar Muneeswarar Temple, Jalan Gurdwara, George Town
- Sri Murugar Temple, Sungai Ara
- Sri Maha Kaliamman Temple, Jalan Batu Gantung, George Town
- Sri Aghora Veerapathra Temple, Jalan Batu Gantung, George Town
- Sri Dharma Muneeeswarar Temple, Jalan Kampung Pisang, George Town
- Sri Muneeswarar Temple, Jalan Kelawai, Pulau Tikus, George Town
- Sri Dhurga Devi Temple, Jalan Kelawai, Pulau Tikus, George Town
- Sri SivaShakti Durgaiamman, George Town
- Sri Saiva Muneeswarar Alayam, Island Glades
- Sree Maha Mariamman Devasthanam Temple, Butterworth
- Arulmigu Sri Muthu Mariamman Temple Sungai Puyu, Butterworth
- Dewi Sree Veerapathra Maha Kaliamman Temple, Butterworth
- Sri Radha Krishna Temple, Butterworth
- Sri Maha Mariamman Temple, Kepala Batas, Penang
- Sri Thandayuthapani Kovil, Jawi
- Sri Thiruthani Kalyana Murugan Temple, Nibong Tebal, Seberang Perai Selatan
- Sri Thandayuthapani Kovil, Bukit Mertajam
- Sri Sangilikarrupar Kaliamman Temple, Butterworth
- Sri Angalla Paramesvary Temple No. 1864/2, Jalan Assumption, Butterworth
- Sri Mangalanayagi Amman Temple, Bukit Tengah
- Sri Maha Kopara Muniswaran Temple, Bukit Tengah
- Sri Mangalanayagi Amman Devasthanam, Bukit Mertajam
- Arulmigu Karumariamman Temple, Seberang Jaya
- Jalan Baru Sri Muniswarar Temple, Perai
- Sri Kaalikambal Amman Temple, Perai
- Sri Selva Vinayagar Temple, Perai
- Sri Meenakshi Amman Kovil, Simpang Ampat
- Sree Sithi Vinayager Devasthanam, Nibong Tebal, Seberang Perai Selatan
- Sri Saiva Muniswarar-Naga Karumariamman Temple, Jalan Heng Choon Thian, Butterworth
- Throwpathi Amman Temple, Pokok Machang, Butterworth
- Sri Jadah Muniswaran Temple, Bagan Lebai Tahir, Butterworth
- Sri Akni Muniswarar Temple, Permatang Tinggi
- Sri Muniswaran Alayam, Penanti
- Sri Maha Mutthalaman Alayam, Simpang Ampat
- Arulmigu Sri Kolavizhiamman Temple, Telok Air Tawar, Butterworth

=== Perak ===
- Arulmigu Sri Subramaniar Alayam, Langkap
- Sri Maha Sivalayam Aulong, Taiping
- Arulmigu Sri Maha Amman Temple, Jalan Kota, Taiping
- Shri Maha Ganesha Temple, Jalan Stesen, Taiping
- Sivan Temple, Taiping
- Sri Navanetha Krishna Temple, Taiping
- Sri Tendhayuthapani Murugan Temple, Taiping
- Kallu Malai Murugan Temple, Bukit Larut (Maxwell), Taiping
- Shri Maha Kaliamman Temple, Jalan Kota Taiping.
- Sri Sithi Vinaygar Temple, Pokok Assam, Taiping
- Marathandavar Muniswaran Temple, Jalan Tupai, Taiping
- Sri Arulandan Muniswaran Sivan, Mariamman Temple, Simpang Halt Taiping
- Sri Mariaman Temple, Kg Expo, Kamunting, Taiping
- Sree Senthil Vel Murugan Aalayam, Tong Wah Estate, Tapah
- Sree Maha Muthu Mariamman, TRP Taiping
- Sri Maha Lechumy Amman Alayam, Slim River
- Sri Meenachiamman Alayam, Slim River
- Arulmigu Annai Devi Sri Karumariamman Alayam, Bedford/Slim Village, Slim River
- Sree Bathra Kaliamman Temple, Fair Park, Ipoh
- Arulmigu Thandayuthabani Alayam Teluk Intan
- Sri Venkateswara Devastanamu Sungai Sumun, Hutan Melintang, Teluk Intan
- Aruligu Mariaman Alayam Kg Kilang, Beruas
- Arulmigu Sri Subramaniar Alayam, Beruas
- Om Sri Maha Nagakanniamman Temple, Changkat, Batu Gajah
- Sri Subramaniyar Swamy Temple, Batu Gajah
- Arulmigu Sri Maha Mariamman Temple, Buntong Ipoh
- Sri Maha Kaliamman Temple, Buntong Ipoh
- Kallumalai Arulmigu Sri Subramaniyar Temple, Gunong Cheroh, Ipoh
- Arulmigu Sri Maha Batrakaliamman Temple, Batu Gajah
- Arulmigu Nagammal Paripalana Sabah
- Sri Kaliamman Temple, Jalan Tanjung Tualang, Batu Gajah
- Sri Sithi Vinayagar Temple, Bidor, Perak
- Sri Maha Mariamman Temple, MTD Batu Gajah
- Arulmigu Sri Muthu Mariamman Temple, Changkat Batu Gajah
- Om Sri Arulmigu Sivasakthi Alayam Changkat Batu Gajah
- Sri Ayyanar Temple, Ulu Sepetang
- Sri Buloh Kali Ammah Alayam, Batu 24, Jalan Bagan Datoh, Selekoh, Perak
- Sri Anantha Nadarajar Alayam, (Hindu Sabah Sivan Koyil) No 1152, Jalan Syed Abu Bakar, Teluk Intan
- Sri Seethala Maha Mariamman Alayam, Batu 4, Teluk Intan
- Arulmigu Sri Maha Mariamman Alayam, Kota Baharu, Gopeng
- Om Sri Laksmi Sameithe Sri Sunderajar Perumal Kovil, Jalan Lahat, Ipoh
- Om Sri Veeramuthukaliamman (Kunggumangi), Kg Chekkadi, Buntong, Ipoh
- Sri Thiroubathi Amman Temple Ladang Kalumpong Bagan Serai
- Sree Maha Muthu Mari Amman Temple Ladang Jin Seng Bagan Serai
- Sri Ramar Temple, Lumut, Perak (Naval Base)
- Arulmigu Sri Raja Rajeswari Amman Temple, Menglembu, Ipoh

=== Selangor ===
- Batu Caves
- Sri Maha Muniswarar Alayam, Taman Seri Berembang, Pelabuhan Klang
- Kuil Sri Perumal Simpang Morib Banting Kuala Langat
- Sri maha mariamman tample, Taman Glenmarie, U1/80, Jalan Subang, Batu 3, Shah Alam
- Devi Sri Maha Karumariamman, Sri Muniswarar, Sri Kottai Muniandy Temple, Batu 2 Jalan Langat, Klang
- Sungai Buloh Sri 18 Bhagavathi Amman Temple
- Arulmigu Sri Subramaniyar Alayam, Rawang
- Sri Devi Padaivetri Maha Mariamman Kovil, Bt 5 1/2 Meru, Klang
- Sri Maha Mariamman Temple, Bandar Baru Salak Tinggi, Sepang
- Sri Maha Mariamman Alayam, Bukit Kemuning 12 km, Shah Alam
- Sri Subramaniam Kovil
- Sri Subramaniar Alayam, Sepang, Selangor
- Sri Sitthi Vinayagar Kovil, Petaling Jaya
- Sri Sakthi Easwari Kovil, Petaling Jaya
- Sri Shivan Temple, Bukit Gasing
- Sri Subramaniar Kovil, Petaling Jaya
- Sri Subramania Swamy Kovil, Klang
- Sri Sivan Kovil, Kota Road, Klang
- Sri Maha Mariamman Kovil, Klang
- Sri Maha Mariamman Kovil, Sungai Buloh
- Sri Selva Vinayagar Kovil, Klang
- Sri Raja Rajeswary Kovil, Ampang
- Sri Sakthi Vinayagar Alayam, Ampang
- Sri Thruga Parameswary Amman Alayam, Kampung Tumbuk, Tanjong Sepat, Selangor
- Sri Subramaniaswami Temple Paribalana Sabai, Kajang
- Sri Sundaraja Perumal Kovil, Klang
- Sri Maha Mariamman Temple, Telok Panglima Garang, Banting
- Sri Maha Mariamman Temple, Klang
- Sri Maha Mariamman Alayam, Kg Muhibah, Rawang
- Sri Vartharaja Perumal Temple, SS 13 Subang Jaya
- Sri Veerakathy Vinayagar Temple, Rawang
- sri subramaniam swamy kovil, Jalan reko kajang
- Sri Maha Mariamman Temple, Jalan Anggerik Vanilla, Kota Kemuning, Shah Alam
- Seafield Sri Maha Mariamman Temple, UEP Subang Jaya
- Sri Murugan Temple, Persiaran Selangor, Shah Alam (CSR Sugar)
- Sri Murugan Temple Bandar Sunway, Subang Jaya
- Sri Vengadachalapathy Temple, Puchong, Subang Jaya
- Sri Maha Maheswari Kaliamman Temple, Batu 14 Puchong
- Sri Maha Mariamman Temple, Batu 14 Puchong
- Sri Srinivasa Perumal Temple, Pusat Bandar Puchong
- Sri Naga Nageswary Amman Temple, Puchong
- Sri Maha Kaliamman Temple, Seafield, Subang Jaya (demolished)
- Sri Subramaniar Aalaya, Semenyih
- Sri Maha Kaliamman Temple, Kampung Sireh, Semenyih
- Sri Maha Mariamman Temple, Ladang Rinching, Semenyih
- Sri Veppilaikari Mariamman Aalayam, Sa-ringgit Est, Semenyih
- Sri Maha Mariamman Temple, HICOM, Shah Alam
- Om Sri Maha Veera Jada Muneswarar Alayam (Jalan E3/1), Taman Ehsan, Kepong
- Sri Rajarajeswari Alayam, Taman Sri Sentosa, Klang
- Sri Subramaniar Kovil, Port Klang
- Sri Maha Muneeswarar Aalayam, Jalan Klang Banting, Klang Selangor
- Sri Muniswaran Temple, Bukit Tinggi, Klang
- Arulmigu Sri Subramaniar Temple, Kerling
- Sri Sithivinayagar Temple Jalan Pahang, Kuala Kubu Bharu
- Sri Pottu Veerar Aalayam, Batu Belah, Meru, Klang
- sri thurobathai amman alayam, tongkah, Banting
- Arulmigu Om Sri Muneeswaran Alayam, Tepi Sungai Klang
- Arulmigu Om Sri Raaja Muniswarar Alayam, Jalan Besar, Pandamaran
- Sri Sitthi Vinayagar, Taman Kim Chuan, Pandamaran, Klang
- Om Sri Maha Mariamman Alayam, Pandamaran, Klang
- Om Sri Vettaikara Pandimuni Kaliamman Alayam, Pandamaran, Klang
- Sri VeeraBhatra Kaliammal Temple, Sg.Jelok, Kajang
- Arulmigu Agora Veerabathirar-Sanggili Karuppar Alayam, Kg. Benggali, Rawang
- Anggala Parameswari / Pechayi Amman Temple, Ladang Bukit Talang, Kuala Selangor
- Sri Muneerwaran Temple, Ladang Tuan Mee
- Sri Rama Baktha Raja PanjaMukha Aanjaneyar Temple (Taman Sentosa Klang and Vanarai Padai Urumi Melam Members)
- Sri Balasubramaniar Alayam Sungai Tinggi Estate Batang Berjuntai
- Kuil Sri Maha Muniswarar, Ampang Local Council, Bandar Baru Ampang
- Kuil Aum Siva Sri Muneeswarar, Kampung Benggali, Rawang
- Sri Maha Mariamman Old temple Bukit Rajah New Division, Klang
- Sri Maha Mariamman, Kg. Kayu Ara, Damansara, Petaling Jaya
- Sri Sithi Vinayagar Tanjung Karang
- Kuil Sri Maha Kaligambaal Muneeswarar Puchong Utama
- Arulmigu Sri Ayyappaswamy Devasthanam, Batu Caves
- Sri Raja Kaliamman alayam, Taman Sentosa, Klang
- Sri Maha Maariyamman alayam, Bandar Rinching, 43500 Semenyih Selangor
- Sri Maha Karumaariyamman Alayam, Taman Batu Untong, 42800 Tanjung Sepat
- Sri Jegan Matha Sri Veeravettaikara Muniandy Alayam, Pandamaran, Port Klang
- SriSakthitriyambaganathar Kovil Veedu/ Srisakthitriyambaganathar Shiva Peedam, Shah alam Seksyen 27
- Om Agilandha Aathi Muniswarar Alayam, No 17 Lorong Awan 2, Kuala Ampang
- Sri Veerabathra Kaaliamman Temple, Kajang
- Sri Maha Karumariamman Temple, Banting
- Sri Maha Marriamman Temple, Ladang Dominion, Semenyih
- Sri Ayinariswar Temple, Jalan Genting Kelang Setapak

=== Terengganu ===
- Sri Maha Mariamman Temple, Chukai, Kemaman
- Sri Maha Mariamman Temple, Kerteh, Kemaman
- Sri Kailasa Nathar Alayam, Jalan Cherong Lanjut, Kuala Terengganu

=== Negeri Sembilan ===
- Rasah Sri Mahamariamman Temple, Jalan Dr Muthu, Seremban
- Sri Bala Thandayuthapani Temple, Paul Street
- Om Sri Anjaneyar Aalayam, Jalan Pantai, Port Dickson
- Sri Maha Mariamman, Port Dickson
- Sri Palanimalai Murugan Temple, Ulu Temiang, Seremban
- Sri Maha Mariamman Aalayam, Dusun Nyior Seremban
- Sri Puthu Vinayagar temple, Bukit Tembok
- Sri Maha Mariamman Temple, Bukit Tembok
- Sri Durga Temple, Taman Senawang Jaya Senawang
- Sri Kanthasamy Temple, Kuala Pilah, Negeri Sembilan
- Sri Maha Raja Rajeswarar Temple Tmn Tuanku Jaafar NSDK (Sivan Alayam)
- Sri Rajakaliamman Sri Dato Alayam, Seremban
- Sri Muneeswarar Alayam, Taman Labu Jaya, Seremban
- Sri Mahamariamman Temple, Taman Rasah Jaya
- Dewi Sri Maha Mariamman Thiruthondar Peravai, Pajam, Mantin
- Sri Maha Mariamman Temple, Jalan Besar, Mantin
- Sri Murugan Temple, Siliau, Port Dickson
- Sri Balathandayuthapani Temple, Rantau
- Arulmighu Maha Sapthakaniga Devi Temple, Bukit Kepayang 2
- Sri Kottai Muniswaran Temple, Taman Minang, Port Dickson
- Arulmighu Maha Sapthakanniga Devi Temple, Kanni Koil
- Taman Sri Permata Mariamman Temple, Sungai Ujong
- Sri Murugan Temple, Mambau Seremban
- Sri Muniswarar Temple, Loco Railway Qrts, Rasah Seremban
- Arulmigu Om Sri Muneeswaran Alayam, T Springhill
- Dewi Sri Naagaputru Karumariamman Temple, Lukut, Port Dickson
- Sri Subramaniayar Bala Thendayuthapani Lobak, Jalan Tan Sri Manicavasagam, Seremban
- Sri Raja Kottai Muniswarar, Taman Sri Senawang, Tuanku Jaafar
- Dewi Sri Maha Mariamman Temple Pajam
- Sri Maha Kaliamman Temple, Kg. Benggali, Port Dickson
- Sri Sivasanggara Valmuni Vanamuni Alayam, Rantau
- Arulmigu Subramaniar Temple
- Sri Ambal Alayam, Kampung Arab, Port Dickson

=== Malacca ===
- Sri Mathuraiveeran, Raja Karumariamman & Tuak Pek Kong Temple Jasin, Melaka Chindian Temple
- Sri Subramaniar Thuropathai Amman Alayam, Gajah Berang
- Sri mani Alayam, Batu Berendam
- Sri Mutu Mariam Alayam, Bukit Beruang
- Sri Maha Mariamman Temple, Gajah Berang
- Sri Maha Mariamman Temple, Pengakalan Rama
- Sri Maa Veeran Temple (Madurai Veeran Temple)
- Sri Maha Mariamman Temple, Taman Sri Sebang, Pulau Sebang, Alor Gajah
- Sri Maha Mariamman Temple, Kampung Pulau Sebang, Jalan Simpang Empat, Pulau Sebang, Alor Gajah
- Sri Kailasanathar Temple
- Sri Bala Thandayudabani Temple, Naning division, Simpat Empat
- Sri Mookambikai Temple, Simpang Empat, Alor Gajah
- Arulmigu Sannasimalai Andavar Temple, Cheng
- Sundaramoorti Vinayagar Temple
- Sri Maha Kaaliamman Temple, Jalan Hutan Percha, Alor Gajah
- Sri Astha Thasa Bhuja Kaliamman, Durian Tunggal
- Sri Nondi Samy Alayam Temple, Jalan Pengkalan, Alor Gajah
- Sri Poyatha Moorthi Temple, Jalan Tokong
- Devi Sri Karu Maha Kaliamman Temple, Jasin
- Sri Maha Karumariamman Estate Air Panas, Alor Gajah
- Sri Sithi Vinayagar Temple, Alor Gajah
- Sri Maha Mariamman Estate Kemuning Kru, Alor Gajah
- Sri Subramaniar Alayam Bertam Estate, Durian Tunggal
- Dewi Sri Maha Karumariamman Temple (Kuturai Kovil), Cheng
- Shree Ambaji Temple, Ujong Pasir Melaka
- Sri Kuil Arulmigu Sannasimalai Andavar, Cheng
- Sri Sivan Aalayam, Jasin (Jalan Jasin)
- Sri Mahaa Maariamman Aalayam, Jasin (Jalan Jasin)
- Sri Vanathandavar Alayam, Sungai Udang Melaka (Army Temple)

=== Johor ===
- Persatuan Penganut Maha Mariamman - Taman Megah Ria / Kota Puteri, Masai
- Arulmigu Sri Siva Sakhti Chinna Karupar Alayam, Bandar Seri Alam
- Arulmigu Sri Muniswarar Sri Mariamman Alayam, Kangkar Tebrau
- Sri Vallitheivanai Murugan, Panchor, Muar
- Arulmigu Menaatchi Amman Alaiyam, Kampung Oren, Ulu Tiram
- Sri Devi Karumariamman Temple, Taman Dato Chellam, Ulu Tiram
- Sri Muthu Mariamman Temple – Muar, Muar District
- Sri Nagamalai Koil Alaiyam – Bukit Pasir, Muar, Muar District
- Arulmigu Sri Maha Mariamman Muttapan Alayam – Batu Anam
- Sri Subramaniar Temple – Labis, Segamat District
- Sri Devi Karumariamman Temple – Kg.Boopathi, Chaah, Segamat
- Sri Maha Mariamman Alayam – Chua Estate Ladang Sungai, Labis, Segamat District
- Aathiparasakhti Aalayam – Labis, Segamat District
- Sri Muniswarar Thiru Kovil – Lorong Mempelam, Jalan Skudai, Tampoi
- Arulmigu Sri Raja Mariamman Devasthanam – Jalan Ungku Puan, Bandaraya, Johor Bahru
- Sri Maha Subramaniam Kovil – Skudai
- Thandayuthabani Kovil – Wadi Hana, Johor Bahru
- Sri Maha Kaliamman Kovil – Wadi Hana, Johor Bahru
- Sri Subramaniam Kovil – Masai, Johor Bahru District
- Persatuan Penganut Arulmigu Dewi Sri Maha Karumariamman Temple, Taman Tanjong Puteri Resort, Pasir Gudang
- Sri Muneswaran Kovil – Masai, Johor Bahru
- Maha Kaliamman Kovil – Masai, Johor Bahru
- Dewa Sri Hanumar Thiru Kovil – Tmn Damai Jaya, Skudai, Johor Bahru
- Arulmigu Sri Maha NagaKarumariamman Alayam – Tmn Damai Jaya, Skudai
- Kuil Sri Subramaniar Tangkak Johor
- Arulmigu Sithi Vinayagar Thirukkovil – Johor Jaya
- Arulmigu Sri Athi Siva Sakthi Kanthariswarar Temple – Kampung Melayu Niyor, Kluang
- Sri Maha Mariamman Temple – Jalan Hospital Kluang, Kluang
- Sri Vel Murugan Alayam - Jalan Satu, Taman Bersatu, Kluang
- Aathi Parasakthi Temple - Jalan Mengkibol, Kluang
- Sri Jeya Subramaniar Alayam – Kampung MIC, Sri Lalang Jalan Batu Pahat, Kluang
- Sri ThiruMurugan Alayam - Kem Geresan, Kluang
- Sri Durgaiamman Alayam, Kampung Majid, Kluang
- Sri Nagakani Alayam, Padang Tembak, Kluang, Johor
- Sri Bathrakaliamman Alayam, Kluang Estate,
- Sri Raja Rajeswari Temple, Kluang
- Arulmigu Sri Raja Kaliamman Glass Temple – Bandaraya Johor Bahru
- Sri Mahamariammam Temple – Tai Tak Kota Tinggi
- Sri Maha Marriamman – Ladang New Pogoh, Segamat District
- Sri Karumariamman, Alayam – Ladang Sagil
- Arulmigu Sri Thandayuthapani Alayam, Segamat District
- Sri Maha Mariamman Alayam, Segamat District
- Sri Maha Karumariamman Alayam – Sungai Senarut, Batu Anam
- Maha Mariamman Alayam – Kg. Kenangan, Batu Anam
- Sri Maha Kaliamman Alayam – Batu Anam
- Dewi Sri Meenachi Amman- Ladang Mount Austin, Taman Seri Austin
- Persatuan Sri Rama Thootha Baktha Hanuman Alayam Senai Kampung Sepakat
- Shree Rama Bhaktha Hanuman Temple
- Sri Ayyapan Devasthanam, Desa Tebrau
- Sri Maha Kaliamman Alayam Jalan Genuang Segamat
- Sri Mariamman Temple Pari Palana Saba Jalan Kluang, Batu Pahat
- Arulmigu Menenatchy Sundareswarar (Maragathalingeswar) Thirukovil Jalan Kluang, Batu Pahat
- Persatuan Penganut Dewa Om Sri Mangkadu Veera Kaliamman Alayam Jalan Tanjung Laboh, Batu Pahat

=== Pahang ===
- Sri Maha Mariamman Alayam - Jalan Chamang, Bentong
- Sri Maha Mariamman Temple – Jalan Kemunting, Kuantan
- Sri Sitti Vinayagar Temple – Bukit Ubi, Kuantan
- Sri Subramaniar Aalayam – Jalan Sungai Lembing, Kuantan
- Sri Maha Mariamman Temple – Tanah Ratah, Cameron Highlands
- Sri Maha Mariamman Temple – Bue Valley, Cameron Highlands
- Sri Subramaniyar Temple – Tanah Rata, Cameron Highlands
- Sri Subramaniyar Temple – Ringlet, Cameron Highlands
- Sri Subramaniyar Temple – Kuala Terla, Cameron Highlands
- Sri Thandayuthabani Temple – Brinchang, Cameron Highlands
- Sri Maha Mariaman Temple – Boh Tea Estate, Cameron Highlands
- Sri Maha Mariamman Temple – Sungai Palas Estate, Cameron Highlands
- Thanggala Kaliamman Alayam – Ladang Kelapa Sawit, Bukit Koman, Raub
- Sri Subramaniyar Alayam – Raub
- Sri Maha Mariamman Alayam – Rotan Tunggal, Raub
- Kallukori Sri Kaliamman Alayam – Mentakab
- Sri Maha Mariamman Alayam – Mentakab
- Sri Subramaniar Alayam – Mentakab
- Sri Maha Mariammam Temple Mentakab Estate – Mentakab
- Sri Maha Mariamman Temple – Temerloh
- Sri Marathandavar Bala Dhandayuthapani Alayam, Maran
- Kuil Arulmigu Sri Batumalai Andavar, Batu 18, Jalan Lipis/Raub, Benta
- Kuil Sri Maha Mariamman Ladang Benta, Benta
- Sri Attur Amman Alayam – Benta 10 Pahang, Kuala Lipis
- Sri Subramaniar Aalayam, Jalan Benta, Kuala Lipis
- Sri Maha Mariamman Temple – Budu Estate Benta, Kuala Lipis
- sri maha muthumariamman aalayam – Jengka 16
- sri sithi vinayagar aalayam – Jengka 21
- sri maha mariamman – Jengka 13
- sri maha muniyandhi aalayam – Mentakab
- Dewi Sri Maha Chamundeswary – Kampung Sri Jaya, Maran

=== Kelantan ===
- Sri Maha Karumariamman Temple, Karumaripuram, Kerilla Estate, Tanah Merah
- Sri Marthanda Vilva Muniswarar Alayam, Kuala Krai
- Sri Maha Muthu Mariamman Temple, Tumpat
- Sivasubramaniyam Temple, Kota Bharu
- Thiru Murugan Temple, Kuala Krai
- Shri Maha Kaliaman Alayam, Taman Guchil Jaya, Kuala Krai
- Sri Subramaniasamy Temple, Gua Musang
- Sri Marthanda Vilva Muniswarar Alayam, Kuala Krai

== East Malaysia ==
=== Sabah ===
- Sri Subramaniar Temple – Kem Lok Kawi, Lot 100 Jalan Lama Penampang - Kinarut, Kota Kinabalu
- Sri Pasupathinath Alayam (with Murugan Sannithi) – Jalan Khidmat, Kota Kinabalu
- Thirumurugan Temple – Tawau
- Sri Sivan Kovil (with Murugan Sannithi) – Camp Paradise, Kota Belud
- Sri Sithi Vinayagar Temple, Sandakan

=== Sarawak ===
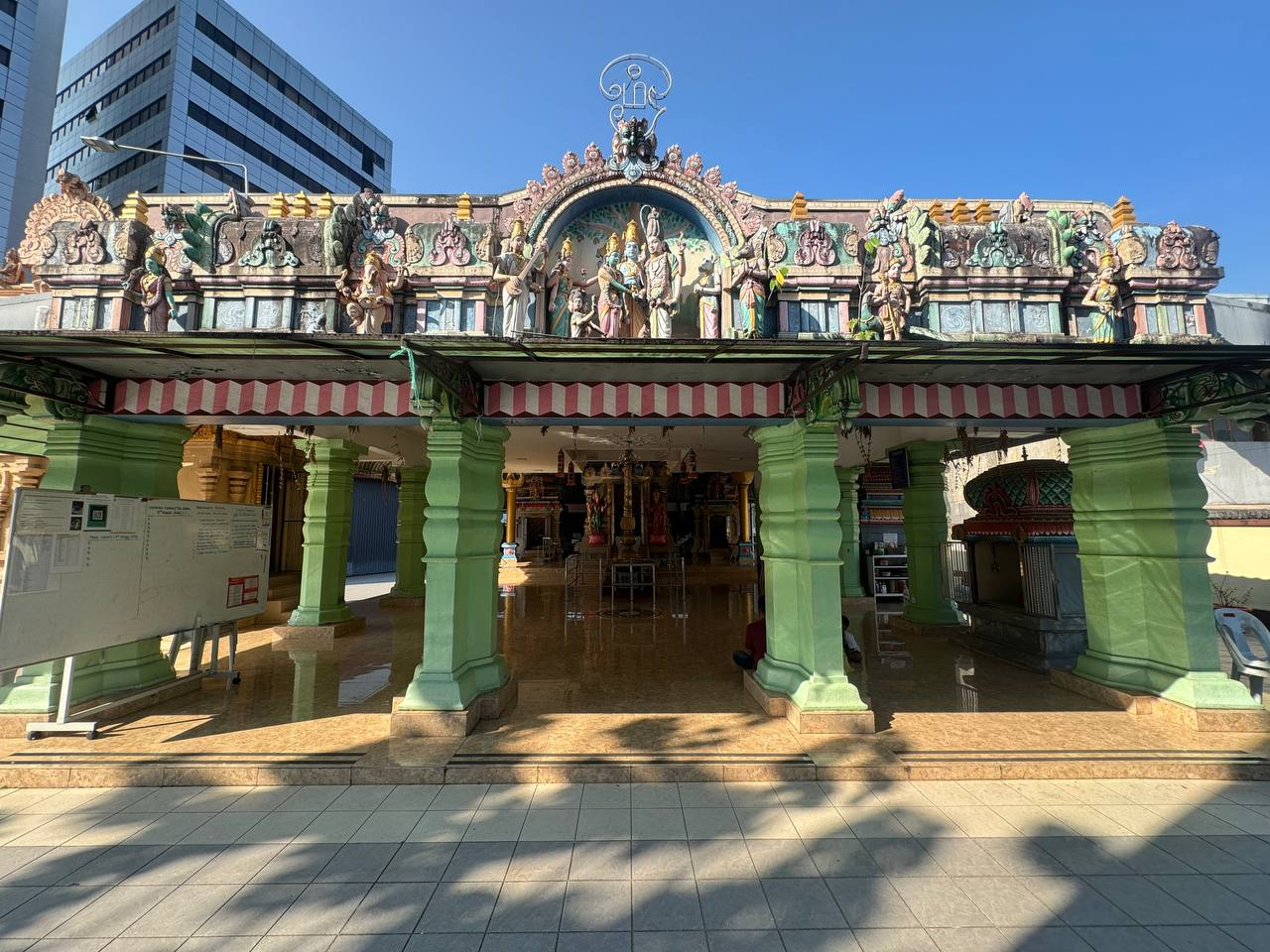
Sri Srinivasagar Kaliamman Temple.

- Sri Maha Mariamman Temple, Mount Matang, Kuching
- Sri Srinivasagar Kaliamman Temple – Ban Hock Road, Kuching
- Sri Maha Mariamman Temple – Batu Lintang, Kuching
- Sri Maha Mariamman Temple – Jalan Orchid, Sibu
- Sri Kamini Durga Eswari Amman Temple - Taman Tunku, Miri

=== Labuan ===
- Thiru Murugan Temple – Pangkalan Udara Labuan, Membedai

== See also ==
- Lists of Hindu temples
