= Jalan Panching =

Road in Malaysia

Federal Route 1488
- Jalan Panching

Route information
- Maintained by Malaysian Public Works Department

Major junctions
- North end: Sungai Atong
- FT 231 Jalan Sungai Lembing; FT 2 Gambang-Kuantan Highway
- South end: Kampung Batu Sepuluh

Location
- Country: Malaysia
- Primary destinations: Sungai Lembing; Panching

Highway system
- Highways in Malaysia; Expressways; Federal; State

Jalan Panching, Federal Route 1488, is a federal road in Pahang, Malaysia.

At most sections, the Federal Route 1488 was built under the JKR R5 road standard, with a speed limit of 90 km/h.

== List of junctions ==
Km	Exit	Junctions	To	Remarks
		Sungai Atong	FT 231 Jalan Sungai Lembing West; Sungai Lembing; Sungai Lembing Museum East; Kuantan; Bandar Indera Mahkota; East Coast Expressway East Coast Expressway; Kuala Terengganu; Kuala Lumpur	T-junctions
		Kampung Danau		
		Kampung Sungai Panching Utara		
		Kampung Sungai Panching Timur		
		Kampung Desa Wawasan		
		FELDA Sungai Panching Selatan		
		Sungai Panching bridge		
		Batu Sepuluh Kuantan Army Camp		
		Kampung Batu Sepuluh	FT 2 Gambang-Kuantan Highway West; Gambang; Maran; Segamat; East Coast Expressway East Coast Expressway; Kuala Lumpur; Temerloh East; Kuantan; Pekan; Sultan Haji Ahmad Shah Airport; East Coast Expressway East Coast Expressway; Kuala Terengganu	T-junctions
