= Balathandayuthapani Temple =

Arulmigu Shree Balathandayuthapani Temple
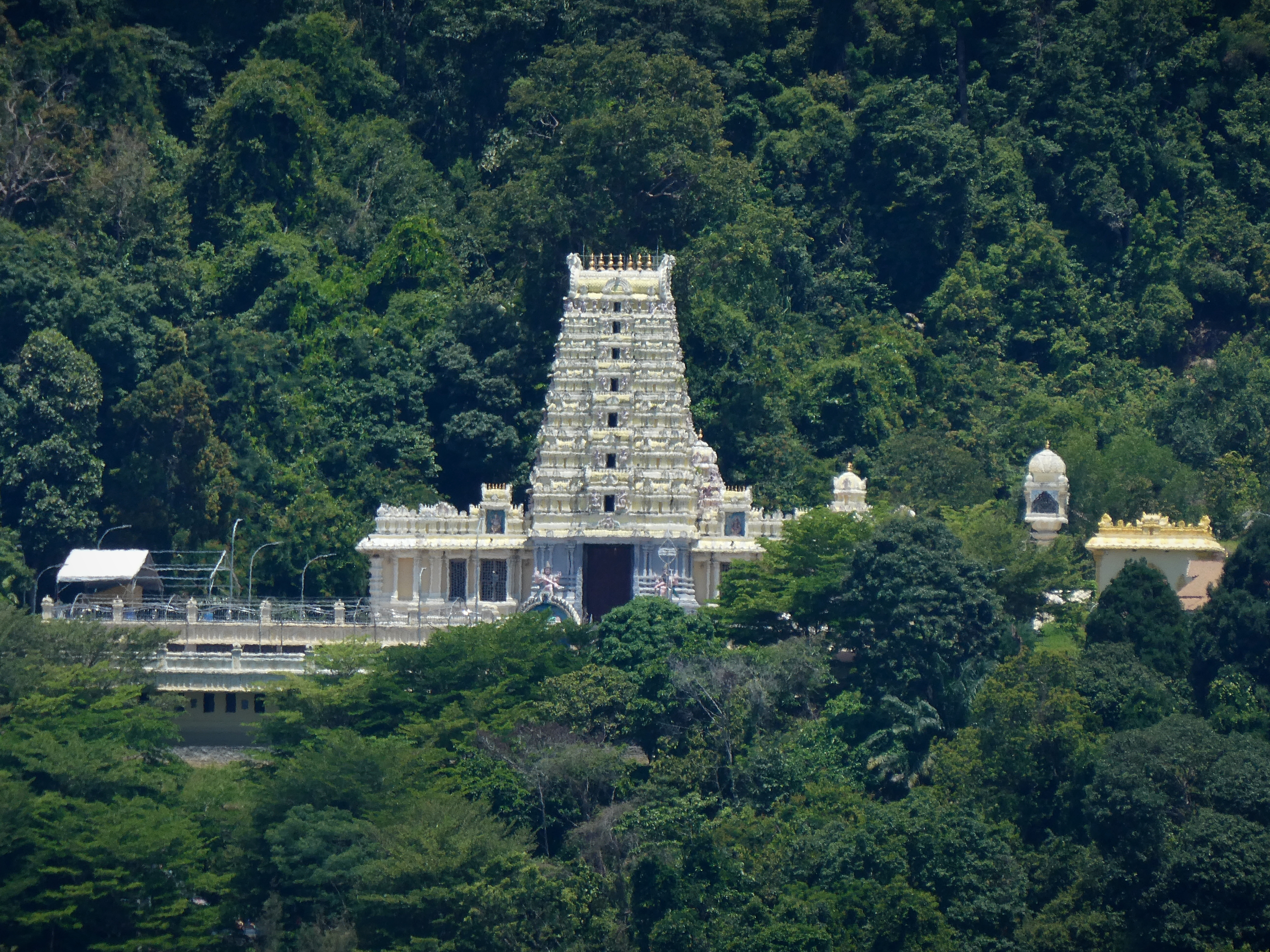

- Location within George Town

Religion
- Affiliation: Hinduism
- Deity: Murugan
- Festivals: Thaipusam, Chitra Pournami, Kantha Sasti, Peria Karthigai and Aadi Karthigai
- Status: Active

Location
- Location: Jalan Kebun Bunga, George Town
- State: Penang
- Country: Malaysia
- Coordinates: 5.434044°N 100.295807°E

Architecture
- Type: Tamil architecture
- Creator: Penang Hindu Endowment Board
- Completed: 1782
- Temple: 5

The Arulmigu Balathandayuthapani Temple, also known as the Waterfall Hilltop Temple, is a Hindu temple in George Town in the Malaysian state of Penang. Dedicated to Murugan, the hilltop temple, with its seven-storey 21.6 m-tall gopuram (main tower), has been touted as the largest Murugan temple outside India. It is sited comparatively higher above ground than Batu Caves, with devotees having to climb 513 steps to access the place of worship.

The temple is also a major focal point for the Hindu festival of Thaipusam in Malaysia. Devotees would customarily embark on a pilgrimage from Lorong Kulit to the temple with offerings of milk pots, or while carrying the Vel Kavadis, considered the highest form of offering to Murugan.

== History ==
=== Golden Chariot ===
A RM3mil golden chariot hit the streets on the eve of Thaipusam on 8 February 2017. The 1.6-tonne golden chariot measuring 4.3m-high and 4m-wide will feature four golden horses in the front with several statues adorning the kalasam (tower). The chariot bearing Lord Muruga's vel (spear) will move on rubberised wheels pulled by devotees. The inner frame of the chariot was made in Karaikudi and shipped to Penang, where it was assembled.

The golden chariot's journey will be from the Arulmigu Sri Maha Mariamman Temple in Queen Street to the Arulmigu Sri Ganesha Temple in Jalan Kebun Bunga. The chariot would be placed at the Sri Ganesha Temple for two days, on Thaipusam eve and on Thaipusam day.

An 18-day puja (special prayers) session will be conducted for The 0.9m-tall golden vel at Queen Street Maha Mariamman Temple. The story goes that the vel was created by Lord Shiva's consort Parasakthi who is also Lord Murugan's mother. Parasakthi appeared in 18 forms before merging into a single indestructible vel which was handed to Lord Murugan during the Poosa natchathiram on Pournami Day (full moon) in the month of Thai (January to February). After receiving a blessing from the Lord's mother, the vel will be sent back to Lord Murugan on the golden chariot on Thaipusam eve.

The golden chariot successfully completed its first trial run for Thaipusam on 2 February 2017 about two hours through George Town in the presence of a large throng of devotees seeing it for the first time. The chariot went 3 km along Jalan Kebun Bunga, Lorong Air Terjun, Jalan Tunku Abdul Rahman, Jalan Macalister, Jalan Residensi and Jalan Utama before returning to the temple.

== Temples and Halls ==
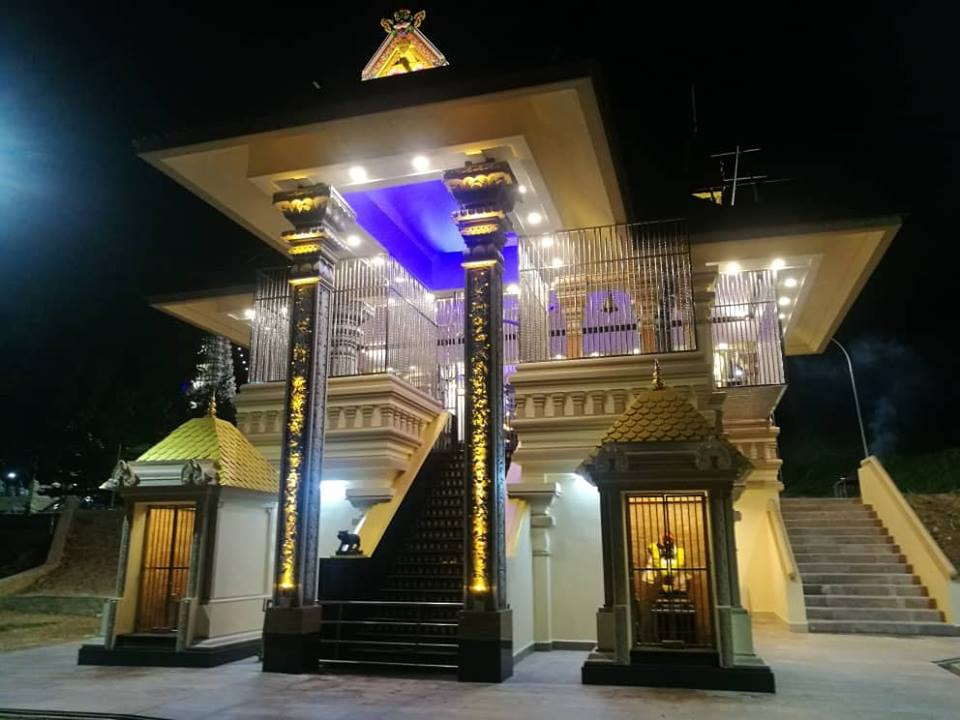
Thannermalai Sri Ayyappan Swamy Temple

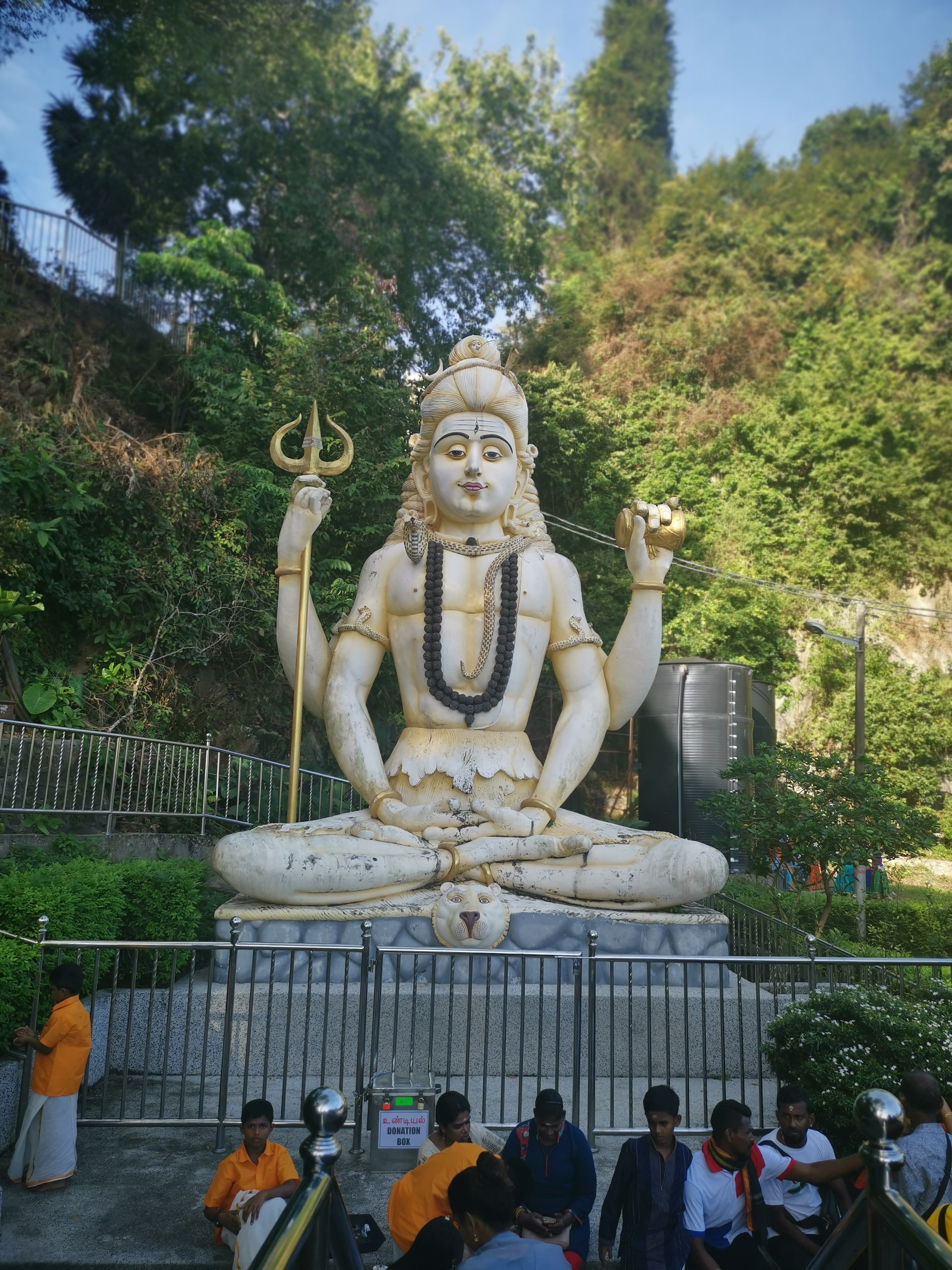
Shiva Statue of Balathandayuthapani Temple

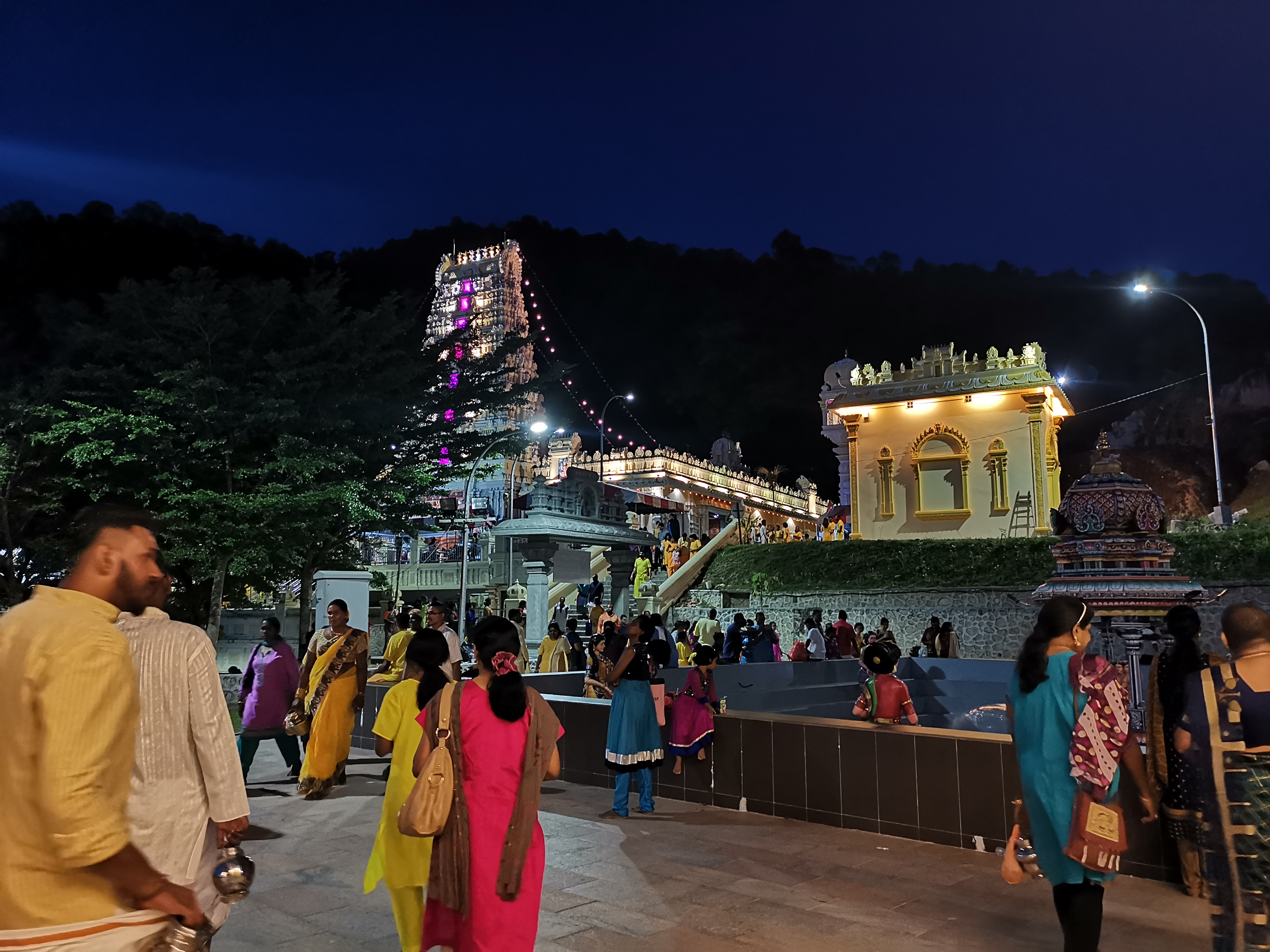
View of main temple from Thannermalai Sri Ayyappan Swamy Temple

=== Arulmigu Balathandayuthapani Temple (Main Temple) ===
The main temple inside the complex. Devotees need to climb 513 steps to reach the temple. The temple is 70,000 sq ft grounds large and built at the cost of RM10 million.

=== Thannermalai Sri Ayyappan Swamy Temple ===
Another temple on the hill. Located beside the main temple

=== Arulmigu Sree Ganeshar Temple ===
Another temple of the Arulmigu Balathandayuthapani Temple complex is dedicated to lord Ganesha. The temple located on the foothill and first temple to visit before climbing up to the main temple. Arulmigu Sree Ganeshar was constructed in 1951 by the Hindu Mahajana Sangam.

=== Arulmigu Naga Naathar Temple ===
A small shine dedicated to Naga Naathar or King Cobra.

=== Shiva Statue of Balathandayuthapani Temple ===
8.23m-tall statue of Lord Shiva at the foot of the hill.

=== Hindu Mahajana Sangam Madam ===
See Also : Hindu Mahajana Sangam

Hindi Mahajana Sangam or also known as Gandhiji Ashram among locals, is a community hall at the foot of the Balathandayuthapani Temple. The hall was built by the early Indian settlers who were the waterfront workers in late 1920s and was originally known as Madaalayam or Kootakadai Madam. The Sangam intends to preserve the Dewan Mahatma Gandhi building as a heritage building as in our view this is the only building that exist today which is based on the South Indian Architecture left in the whole of Malaysia.

== Chithra Pournami (Chitraparuvam) ==
The Hindu Mahajana Sangam, with notable among the festivals, the annual Chitraparuvam Festival which is celebrated in the Tamil month of Chithirai (April/May) every year, is organised with a chariot procession of the panchaloha deity of Lord Subramaniyaswami from Queen Street Sri Mahamariamman Temple. It is the day of the first full moon of the first Tamil month. In early years, the festival starts with special pooja and ubayam for the Hindu Mahajana Sangam Koota Kadai in Queen Street Mahamariamman Temple, the chariot procession commences in the early morning 7.00 am and reached Waterfall Dewan Mahatma Gandhi (Gandhiji Ashram) in the afternoon, the deity then carried and placed in the ashram until the return journey of the chariot to Queen Street Sri Mahamariamman temple in the evening of the same day.

Since the early 1970s, this festival is celebrated for three days. The deity of Lord Subramaiyaswami is brought in procession from the Queen Street Sri Mahamariamman temple passing through many street and roads before reaching the Waterfall Arulmigu Sri Ganesha temple. The deity is carried up to the Hilltop Arulmigu Sri Balathadayuthapani Temple. On the second day is the Chitraparuvam Festival where the deity is taken in procession around the hilltop temple compound in the evening. On the third day evening, the deity is carried down and placed on the chariot procession journey back to the Queen Street Sri Mahamariamman temple. In 1992, the Hindu Mahajana Sangam imported a new chariot from India, for the annual Chitraparuvam Festival celebration to replace the old chariot which was found to be not road worthy and in a decaying condition.

== See also ==
- List of Hindu temples in Malaysia
- Thaipusam
- Malaysian Indian
