= Jalan Bukit Goh =

Road in Malaysia

Bukit Goh Road
- Bukit Goh Road
- Jalan Bukit Goh

Route information
- Maintained by Malaysian Public Works Department

Major junctions
- South end: Kampung Padang Perdana
- FT 231 Jalan Sungai Lembing; FT 1487 Jalan Bukit Kuantan
- North end: Kampung Bukit Goh

Location
- Country: Malaysia
- Primary destinations: FELDA Bukit Goh; Bukit Kuantan; Jabur

Highway system
- Highways in Malaysia; Expressways; Federal; State

Jalan Bukit Goh, Federal Route 1486, is a federal road in Pahang, Malaysia.

At most sections, the Federal Route 1486 was built under the JKR R5 road standard, with a speed limit of 90 km/h.

It stretches from Kampung Padang Perdana to Kampung Bukit Goh.

There are planned improvements to this highway in 2027. The improvements span from Bukit Goh traffic light Junction to KotaSAS.

== List of junctions ==
Km	Exit	Junctions	To	Remarks
		Kampung Padang Perdana	FT 231 Jalan Sungai Lembing; West; Sungai Lembing; Sungai Lembing Museum; East Coast Expressway East Coast Expressway; Kuala Lumpur; Kuala Terengganu East; Kuantan; Bandar Indera Mahkota; Sultan Haji Ahmad Shah Airport	T-junctions
		Jalan Bukit Kuantan	North; FT 1487 Jalan Bukit Kuantan; FELDA Bukit Goh; Bukit Kuantan; Jabur	T-junctions
		Kampung Bukit Goh		
