= Malaysia Federal Route 231 =

Road in Malaysia

Federal Route 231
- Jalan Sungai Lembing

Route information
- Maintained by Malaysian Public Works Department
- Length: 35.97 km (22.35 mi)

Major junctions
- West end: Sungai Lembing
- FT 1488 Jalan Panching North–South Expressway Southern Route / AH141; FT 1486 Jalan Bukit Goh FT 3 / AH18 Kuantan Bypass; FT 2 Federal Route 2
- East end: Kuantan

Location
- Country: Malaysia
- Primary destinations: Jabur, Bandar Indera Mahkota, Kuantan Port, Cherating, Kuala Terengganu

Highway system
- Highways in Malaysia; Expressways; Federal; State

Jalan Sungai Lembing, Federal Route 231 (formerly Pahang State Route C4), is a major highway in Kuantan, Pahang, Malaysia. It is also a main route to East Coast Expressway via Kuantan Interchange. The Kilometre Zero of the Federal Route 231 starts at Kuantan.

At most sections, the Federal Route 231 was built under the JKR R5 road standard, allowing maximum speed limit of up to 90 km/h.

== Junction lists ==
The entire route is located in Kuantan District, Pahang.

Legend:

- I/C - Interchange, I/S - Intersection, RSA - Rest and service area, OBR - Overhead bridge restaurant, R/R - Restaurant and rest plaza, L/B - Layby, V/P - Vista point, TN - tunnel, T/P - Toll plaza, BR - Bridge
- C - Cloverleaf, S - Stack, T-A - Trumpet-A, T-B - Trumpet-B, DT - Directional-T/Y, SDT - Semi-Directional-T/Y, P-Y - Partial-Y, D - Diamond, P-C - Partial cloverleaf, D-D - Diverging diamond, D-R - Direct ramp

Location	km	mi	Name	Destinations	Notes
Sungai Lembing	47.0	29.2	Sungai Lembing	Sungai Lembing – Myan, Sungai Pandan Waterfall, Sungai Lembing Museum	T-junctions
Sungai Lembing			Kolek		
Sungai Lembing			Panching	Gua Panching, Gua Charah	T-junctions
Sungai Lembing			Kampung Ah Tong		
Sungai Lembing			Kampung Danau		
Sungai Lembing			Kampung Sungai Besar		
Sungai Lembing			Sungai Atong	Kampung Ah Tong	
Sungai Lembing			Jalan Panching	FT 1488 Jalan Panching – FELDA Sungai Panching Utara, FELDA Sungai Panching Timur, FELDA Sungai Panching Selatan, Gambang	T-junctions
Sungai Lembing			Sungai Danau		
Sungai Lembing			Sungai Kuantan bridge		
Sungai Lembing			Bukit Kuin		
Sungai Lembing			Sungai Riau bridge		
Bandar Indera Mahkota			Kuantan-ECE	Malaysian Highway Authority East Coast Regional Office East Coast Expressway / AH141 – Kuala Lumpur, Maran, Gambang, Jabur, Chukai, Kuala Terengganu	T-junctions
Bandar Indera Mahkota			Kampung Padang Perdana	FT 1486 Jalan Bukit Goh – Bukit Goh, FELDA Bukit Goh, Bukit Kuantan, Jabur, KotaSAS	T-junctions
Bandar Indera Mahkota			Kampung Padang Darat		
Bandar Indera Mahkota			Kampung Padang		
Bandar Indera Mahkota			Sungai Pinang bridge		
Bandar Indera Mahkota			Sungai Pinang		
Bandar Indera Mahkota			Bandar Indera Mahkota; Indera Mahkota 14 and 15	Jalan Sultan Abdullah – Indera Mahkota 14 and 15	T-junctions
Bandar Indera Mahkota			Bandar Indera Mahkota; Indera Mahkota 13	Astana Golf and Country Club	T-junctions
Bandar Indera Mahkota			Start/End of dual carriageway		
Bandar Indera Mahkota			Bandar Indera Mahkota; Kuantan Bypass I/C	FT 3 / AH18 Kuantan Bypass – Kuantan Port, Kuala Terengganu, Chukai, Cherating, Sultan Haji Ahmad Shah Airport, Kuala Lumpur, Gambang, Johor Bahru, Terminal Kuantan Sentral	Cloverleaf interchange
Bandar Indera Mahkota			Persiaran KWSP	Persiaran KWSP – Ministry of Home Affairs (KDN) Complex (Pahang Branch)), Pahang EPF Building, International School of Kuantan (ISK), Kuantan Town Park	
Bandar Indera Mahkota			Kuantan Medical Centre	Kuantan Medical Centre	
Bandar Indera Mahkota			Bandar Indera Mahkota; Indera Mahkota I/S	Jalan Sultan Ahmad Shah – Indera Mahkota 8, International Islamic University Malaysia (IIUM) Kuantan Campus, Hospital UIAM (IIUM Medical Centre); Persiaran Sultan Abu Bakar – Indera Mahkota 2 until 14	Junctions
Bandar Indera Mahkota			Bandar Indera Mahkota; Indera Mahkota 1	Taman Mahkota Putra – Tengku Ampuan Afzan Mosque	
Kuantan			Taman Sungai Charu		
Kuantan			Bukit Ubi		
Kuantan			Kuantan; Jalan Dato Lim Hoe Lek	Jalan Dato Lim Hoe Lek – Darul Makmur Stadium	T-junctions
Kuantan			Kuantan; Jalan Wong Ah Jang	Jalan Tun Dr Ismail – Beserah, Kuantan Bus and Taxi Terminal; Jalan Dato Wong Ah Jang – Tanah Putih, Gambang	Junctions
Kuantan			Kuantan; Jalan Gambut	Jalan Gambut	T-junctions; Exit only
Kuantan			Kuantan; Jalan Masjid	Jalan Masjid – Jalan Gambut, Federal Building, Sultan Ahmad Shah Mosque	T-junctions
Kuantan	0.0	0.0	Kuantan; Jalan Mahkota	FT 2 Jalan Mahkota – Tanjung Lumpur, Pekan, Gambang, Teluk Cempedak, Beserah	Start/End of dual carriageway T-junctions
1.000 mi = 1.609 km; 1.000 km = 0.621 mi
