= Jalan Baru Sri Muniswarar Temple =

Hindu temple in Malaysia

Sri Muniswarar Temple Jalan Baru Temple
- Malay: Kuil Sri Muniswarar; Tamil: முனீஸ்வரர் கோவில் ஜாலான் பாரு கோவில்
- Location in Malaysia

Religion
- Affiliation: Hinduism
- District: Prai
- Deity: Muniswarar

Location
- Location: Jalan Baru
- State: Penang
- Country: Malaysia
- Interactive map of Sri Muniswarar Temple; Jalan Baru Temple
- Coordinates: 5°22′48″N 100°23′41″E

Architecture
- Type: Dravidian architecture
- Creator: Indian Immigrants working with the East India Company
- Completed: 1870

Website
- www.srimuniswararperai.com

The Jalan Baru Sri Muniswarar Temple is a Hindu temple in Jalan Baru, Prai, Penang, Malaysia. The temple is dedicated to, Muniswarar. This temple was one of the most famous temple in Malaysia. Today, Shree Muniswarar Temple is most famous for blessing newly purchased cars. It attracts a constant stream of car owners, including many Chinese and non Hindus, to have their cars blessed by the temple priest.

== History ==
The temple was established in the 1870s by a group of Indian immigrants working with the East India Company. The temple was known as Sri Muniandy Temple when it was started. Later the name of the temple was changed to Sri Muniswarar Temple. Initially the temple was only a small attap hut, no cement floor and other facilities, such as piped water and electricity. The temple became famous among the Hindu devotees in Malaysia, Singapore, Indonesia, Thailand, Myanmar, Bangladesh, Cambodia, Japan and India as well as Hindu devotees residing in Australia, Britain, Canada and US. The temple is patronised by many nationalities and religions especially the Hindus, Buddhists, Christians, Sikhs and others. Many Chinese devotees too patronise this temple. The deities at the temple are well known for protection, justice, truth and benevolence.

The deities at the Main Altar are Lord Sri MUNIANDY Sri Ganesha and Lord Muruga. In front of the Main Altar stands Lord MADURAI VEERAN majestically with an "Arivaal" (அரிவாள்-Sword) in one hand. There two white horses beside him, one on the right and another on the left. There is also a dog. It is believed that he used to roam the areas at night after midnight on his white horse with an "Arivaal" and a cigar in his mouth, a turban on his head and attired like an ancient Indian prince. Many devotees who are gifted have seen his apparition, and one among them was a Chinese who saw him entering the temple compound on a white horse in full white Indian attire and was astounded by what he saw. After witnessing such an incident, the said Chinese assisted financially to build a small altar on the present site. The devotees whose vows are fulfilled make offerings or poojas according to their means. Some will offer "prasatham",(பிரசாதம்) some offer live cockerel or goats, others sacrifice goats or cockerel and perform "padaiyal"(படையல்). The non-vegetarian pooja/padayal is offered to "Lord Madurai Veeran".

A book has also been written recently by a Singapore writer highlighting the growing importance of the deities. Those who bring their vehicles to the temple for blessing are given protection from accident and other incidents. Apart from Indians, many Chinese devotees bring their new and old cars to be blessed at the Temple. They also sacrifice goats and cockerel when their vows are fulfilled especially matters related business, health, children education and so forth.

== See also ==
- List of Hindu temples in Malaysia
