= Jalan Bukit Kuantan =

Road in Malaysia

Federal Route 1487
- Jalan Bukit Kuantan

Route information
- Maintained by Malaysian Public Works Department

Major junctions
- South end: Kampung Bukit Goh
- FT 1486 Jalan Bukit Goh; FT 14 Jerangau Highway
- North end: Jabur

Location
- Country: Malaysia
- Primary destinations: FELDA Bukit Goh; Bukit Sagu; Bukit Kuantan

Highway system
- Highways in Malaysia; Expressways; Federal; State

Jalan Bukit Kuantan, Federal Route 1487, is a federal road in Pahang, Malaysia.

At most sections, the Federal Route 1487 was built under the JKR R5 road standard, with a speed limit of 90 km/h.

== List of junctions ==
Km	Exit	Junctions	To	Remarks
		Kampung Bukit Goh	FT 1486 Jalan Bukit Goh; Northeast; Kampung Bukit Goh South; Kuantan; Sungai Lembing; East Coast Expressway East Coast Expressway; Kuala Lumpur; Kuala Terengganu	T-junctions
		FELDA Bukit Goh		
		Bukit Sagu		
		Bukit Kuantan		
		Bukit Ketam		
Pahang Darul Makmur; Kuantan district border
Pahang-Terengganu border
Terengganu Darul Iman; Kemaman district border
		FELDA Neram Satu		
		Jabur	FT 14 Jerangau Highway; North; Kuala Terengganu; Jerangau; Bandar Al-Muktafi Billah Shah; Bandar Chenih Bahru South; Kuantan; Kuantan Port	T-junctions
