= Hindu Mahajana Sangam =

- இந்து மகாஜன சங்கம்

Religion
- Affiliation: Hinduism

Location
- Location: George Town
- State: Penang
- Country: Malaysia

Architecture
- Creator: Kootakadai
- Completed: 1935

Website
- Hindu Mahajana Sangam

The Hindu Mahajana Sangam (Tamil: இந்து மகாஜன சங்கம்) is an association of Indian workers. It is an Indian non-profitable organization at Penang, Malaysia and was officially established in 1935 by waterfronts workers. Before 1935, it known as Kootakkadai (Tamil: கூட்டக்கடை).

The name Mahajana comes from two words, maha meaning great and jana meaning people. So Mahajana can be translated as great people in Tamil, though in Sanskrit it is translated as great vehicle. The Indian workers who founded the organization were farmers back home. They preferred to call themselves Kootakadai, because they worked as a kootam (Tamil: கூட்டம்), which is a gang or group, rather than calling themselves coolies or labourers.

The Hindu Mahajana Sangam was established in 1935 following the first consecration of the Sri Muthu Mariamman Temple on Queen Street in 1933. It was established for religious observances, to promote education, to encourage social and cultural development, and to participate in the administration and development of the Sri Muthu Mariamman and Arulmigu Balathandayuthapani and act as union for the workers.

The sangam's madam (hall), located at 674, Jalan Kebun Bunga (formerly known as Waterfall Road) near the foothill of the Waterfall Arulmigu Balathandayuthapani hilltop temple, is named as Gandhiji Ashram in remembrance of Mohandas Karamchand Gandhi on 22 Feb 1948.

== History ==
The Indian farmers came to Penang from South India in the early 18th Century to work in the Penang waterfront as labourers. They worked for the Indian merchants there and contributed to the development of import and export spice trade in the Island.

There were also Tamil Indian freedom fighters Maruthu Pandiyar relatives and 72 soldiers were deported to Penang in the year 1802 by the Madras Presidency Government (British India Government).

=== Koottakadai ===
There were more than 2,000 workers and their dependents lived in the prewar houses in the town centre than known as simpang lelong or elam muchanthi in Tamil, today this area is known as Little India. They worked in groups/gangs (kootam in Tamil) each gang consist of 50 to 30 workers with a head (Thandal in Tamil) and a clerk (Kanakku Pillai in Tamil) in charge of daily working income account which will be divided and distributed to the workers at the end of the month. They worked for the Indian merchant houses in handling their goods in the import/export trade. These workers are referred to as Kootakadai as they work as a group (Kootam). There were more than 50 groups operating in the Weld Quay waterfront handling cargo in the tongkangs or wooden barges in the import and export trade. In the many open concrete fields in the town, some of the workers were involved in storing; drying and re-bagging of betel nuts imported from Indonesia for re-export. For the workers relaxation in the evening, the authorities operated 2 government toddy shops in the town centre, one in Market Lane/Muda Lane junction which still exist today and the other in King Street which was bombed by the Japanese during the 2nd World War, this site have been since rebuilt into a warehouse for the customs department. During the War many workers joined the Indian National Army. They also had a unique form of a gathering to raise emergency funds for their needs call Needs (Thaevai in Tamil) where each worker contribute and his amount and name recorded and same amount return to him in another function.

=== Sri Muthu Mariamman Temple ===
In 1833 the workers founded the Queen Street Sri Muthu Mariamman Temple (The temple was renamed Arulmigu Mahamariamman Temple in 1980 by the Hindu Endowment Board). The waterfront workers contributed to the development, construction and management of the Queen Street and Waterfall temples. The inner city Hindu population was mostly waterfront workers who established the Hindu Mahajana Sangam in 1935. The sangam was established with the main purpose of managing the Queen Street and Waterfall hilltop temples. The Queen street temple which was then managed by a few trustees appointed by the Board. One of these trustees was Mr K.V. Karuppiah Thandal, who became the inaugural secretary of the sangam.

The sangam was also involved in promoting religious observance, developing Tamil education and Indian culture. It was also involved in arbitrating disputes within the community which served as an avenue to discuss and address social problems affecting Indian workers. It set up a panchayat committee to solve these problems. The sangam started Tamil schools to educate the Tamil children, and was active in promoting cultural activities and religious practices.

=== Union for the workers ===
The Hindu Mahajana Sangam was a channel in bring up the grievances of the Indian community to the proper authorities and acted as a union for the workers until 1950, when the Waterfront Workers Union was formed. This later became known as the Weld Quay Workers Union. In the early 1970s, when the Government established the Penang Labour Board, the Weld Quay Workers Union was amalgamated with the Prai Cargo Handlers and the Penang Stevedores Union to form the Penang Port Workers Union, with its office in King Street.

The sangam's Hon. Secretary, the late K. V. Karuppiah Thandal, the head of one of the numerous groups of workers was a trustee of the Queen Street Sri Muthu Mariamman temple and the sangam members were regularly appointed to the Hindu Endowment Board and the members held various positions in the temples management committees and contributed to the temples development.

The sangam's president, the late Mr. M. Doraisamy Thevar JP, PJK was the last Hindu Endowment Board member representing the Hindu Mahajana Sangam and was also the chairman of the Temples Management Committee, which carried out the 2nd consecration ceremony of the Queen Street, Sri Muthu Mariamman Temple.

Between 1960s and 70s many of the workers living in the inner city became jobless due to the Indonesian confrontation and also because the Indian merchants began to reduce the usage of the tongkangs/barges in transporting cargo to vessels and used the newly built PPC Butterworth deepwater wharves in the mainland to be cost effective. Therefore, many of the workers due to lack of job opportunities and their expanded families gradually left the town centre for economic reasons to various parts of the Island, to the slums in the Weld Quay reclamation area, Noordin Street Flats, mainland and far South, some of them even left Penang permanently to settle in India.

=== Building ===
The Hindu Mahajana Sangam operated out of 47 Church Street from 1935 until 1947, when it moved to 40 Church Street. The sangam moved out of 40 Church Street in 1988 after the property was sold. It was then that it moved to its own building, the Gandhiji Ashram, at 674 Jalan Kebun Bunga.

Today it is based at the Gandhiji Ashram, a community hall at the foot of the Balathandayuthapani Temple near the Penang Botanic Gardens. The hall was built by the early Indian settles who were the waterfront workers in late 1920s and was originally known as Madaalayam or Kootakadai Madam. The Sangam intends to preserve the Dewan Mahatma Gandhi building as a heritage building as in our view this is the only building that exist today which is based on the South Indian Architecture left in the whole of Malaysia. This building is of significant historic value need to be preserved for our future generation to appreciate our heritage.

== Contributions ==
The Sangam to strengthen the religious beliefs in the community every year organizes various festivals and celebrations in Queen Street Sri Maha Mariamman Temple, Waterfall Sri Bala Thendayuthapani Hilltop temple, Penang Road Sri Kunj Bihari Krishna Temple and Dewan Mahatma Gandhi.

=== Dewan Mahatma Gandhi ===
The members of the Sangam built the hall (madam in Tamil) in the Waterfall Balathandayuthapani Temple compound to cater for the devotees attending the annual Thaipusam (during Jan/Feb) and the annual Chitraparuvam Festivals (during April/May). This is a rare heritage building representing the South Indian architecture. Not only Dewan Mahatma Gandhi is used as a religious retreat, it also provides shelter to estate workers who come to Penang during the festivals. Due to lack of transport and accommodation in the earlier years, the sangam provided free temporary accommodation for the devotees from outstation attending the festivals and free vegetarian lunch to the public. This tradition is still being carried out by the Sangam members till today. On 22 February 1948 during a condolences gathering for the late Mahatma Gandhi, the members unanimously named the Sangam's hall Dewan Mahatma Gandhi (Ganhdhiji Ashram). On 5 October 2008, A ceremony was held at the Gandhiji Ashram to unveil a life size statue of Mahatma Gandhi. The ceremony was also to celebrate United Nations' International Day against violence and to commemorate the birthday of Mahatma Gandhi. Beginning from August 2013, an exhibit of rare photographs of Mahatma Gandhi is open to the public from 10:00 am to 1:00 pm, on every Fridays, Saturdays and Sundays.

=== Pillaiyar Temple ===
In 1951 the Sangam built the Pillaiyar Temple in the Waterfall Temple compound and held its first consecration ceremony. In the late 1970s the Hindu Endowment Board rebuilt this temple and renamed it Arulmigu Sri Ganesar Temple.

=== Chitraparuvam ===
The Hindu Mahajana Sangam, with notable among the festivals, the annual Chitraparuvam Festival which is celebrated in the Tamil month of Chithirai (April/May) every year, is organised with a chariot procession of the Panchaloha (Tamil: ஐம்பொன்) deity of Lord Subramaniyaswami from Queen Street Sri Mahamariamman Temple. It is the day of the first full moon of the first Tamil month. In early years, the festival starts with special pooja and ubayam for the Hindu Mahajana Sangam (Koota Kadai) in Queen Street Sri Mahamariamman temple, the chariot procession commences in the early morning 7.00 am and reached Waterfall Dewan Mahatma Gandhi (Gandhiji Ashram) in the afternoon, the deity then carried and placed in the ashram until the return journey of the chariot to Queen Street Sri Mahamariamman temple in the evening of the same day.

Since the early 1970s this festival is celebrated for three days. The deity of Lord Subramaiyaswami is brought in procession from the Queen Street Sri Mahamariamman temple passing through many street and roads before reaching the Waterfall Arulmigu Sri Ganesha temple. The deity is carried up to the Hilltop Arulmigu Sri Balathadayuthapani Temple. On the second day is the Chitraparuvam Festival where the deity is taken in procession around the hilltop temple compound in the evening. On the third day evening, the deity is carried down and placed on the chariot procession journey back to the Queen Street Sri Mahamariamman temple. In 1992, the Hindu Mahajana Sangam imported a new chariot from India, for the annual Chitraparuvam festival celebration to replace the old chariot which was found to be not road worthy and in a decaying condition.

On the first day, the chariot passes through Queen Street, Chulia Street, Chulia Street Ghaut, Victoria Street, Prangin Road Ghaut, C. Y. Choy Road, Magazine Road, Dato Keramat Road, Western Road and Waterfall Road before reaching the Ganesar Temple. The chariot stops at Kamatchi Amman Temple, Sivan Temple and Muneeswarar Temple along the way. Then the Lord Subramaniyaswami is carried up to the Sri Balathandayuthapani Temple at the hilltop.

On the return journey, the Lord Subramaniyaswami is carried down and the chariot passes through Waterfall Road, Gottlieb Road, Tunku Abdul Rahman Road, Macalister Road, Anson Road, Burma Road, Transfer Road, Sri Bahari Road, Penang Road, Kimberley Street, Carnarvon Street, Chulia Street, Pitt Street, Church Street, Queen Street, China Street, King Street, Light Street, Penang Street, Chulia Street, King Street, China Street, Beach Street, Market Street and Queen Street before reaching the Sri Mahamariamman Temple. The chariot stops at Balathandayuthapani Temple, Meenatchi Sundaraeswarar Temple, ISKCON Centre, Muneeswarar Temple and Kunj Bihari Temple along the way.

=== Navarathiri ===
The Navarathiri festival begins with the lion flag raising ceremony and ends with a procession where the Panchaloha (Tamil: ஐம்பொன்) deity of Mahamariamman is paraded in a decorated wooden chariot through the streets of Little India. Navarathiri is nine nights' vegetarian festival. According to the Hindu Puranas, the festival is held to commemorate the victory of Goddess Adi Parashakti over the demon king Mahishasuran. It was stated that the evil king ill-treated the people that they turned to the goddess, who is the consort of Lord Shiva, to save them. Goddess Adi Parasakthi fought a battle for nine days and ultimately destroyed him on the 10th day, which is known as Vijayadashami.

Various Indian organisations and communities would sponsor the prayers for each of the nights. On the Final tenth day of the celebration, Vijayadashami is celebrated by Hindu Mahajana Sangam. The sangam organised the chariot procession for many years from Queen Street, Sri Mahamariamman Temple to Dhoby Ghaut. The festival celebration is concluded after shooting of arrows from the chariot in the evening in the Dhoby Ghaut. The chariot returns to the temple at about midnight the same day. Since the late 1970s, the organisation of the chariot procession had been taken over from the sangam by the Temple committee and the Hindu Endowments Board. The chariot procession is now confined to Fort Cornwallis area, nearby the Kedah Pier Muneeswarar Temple in the Esplanade. However, the sangam still continues to celebrate the annual Navarathiri festival's final tenth day Vijayadashami Ubayam every year without fail.

=== Vaikunda Ekadhasi ===
The celebration the annual Vaikunda Ekadhasi festival in the Sri Kunj Bihari Temple, Penang Road since the early 1900s. This festival falls in December/January every year and is celebrated with a special ubayam and pooja at night, followed by the procession of the Panchaloha (Tamil: ஐம்பொன்) deities Krishna along with Rukmini and Satyabhama are carried out around within the temple premises. Religious hymns (Bhajan) will be conducted until the following morning in the main hall of the temple. The celebration is concluded with a special Pooja in the early morning of the following day. The devotees break their fast and our members serve vegetarian meal after the prayers.

=== Thaipusam ===
The annual Thaipusam festival is celebrated in the Gandhiji Hall (Dewan Mahatma Gandhi) Waterfall, from the eve of the Festival day. Free lunch is provided on the day before, in the evening light food and drinks served to the public. On Thaipusam day, free breakfast, lunch and dinner is served to the public.

The Hindu Mahajana Sangam members carry a traditional kavadi weighing approximately 80 kilos known as Atta Kavadi since 1927 from Queen Street Sri Mahamariamman temple in the evening to Dewan Mahatma Gandhi in the Arulmigu Balathandayuthapani Temple, Penang compound with traditional Nadhaswaram accompanying the Atta Kavadi. A late night dinner is served in the Dewan Mahatma Gandhi after the arrival of the Atta Kavadi. In the early years the arrival of the Atta Kavadi signifies the conclusion of the annual Thaipusam festival celebration for the day and devotees are not expected to carry any kavadi after the Atta Kavadi reaches the Waterfall temple compound.

In the last few years our sangam had been organizing exhibitions on Hindu religious practices where various organizations participated. Anti Dadah and health exhibitions were held. These exhibitions were officiated by YB Dato' Dr. K. Rajapathy, the Hindu Endowment Board chairman during the festivals.

=== Non-violence Day ===
The Hindu Mahajana Sangam and Taiping Peace Initiative will jointly organize the United Nations International Day of Non-Violence commemorating the birthday of Mahatma Gandhi.

== Activities and future plans ==
In the past 15 years, the sangam has enhanced its activities with the cooperation of NGOs in Penang by providing free medical camp, yoga for health, weekly evening lectures on Hinduism, weekly education class for children and charity for the underprivileged. Since early 1999, the sangam started to revamp it is activities in line with its objectives and refurbished the hall to incorporate various facilities. It now has a library, a computer lab, meeting room and toilet facilities. The sangam with help of the volunteers organize religious and Tamil class for children on every Sunday afternoon. Tuition and computer classes for children in the primary school every Sunday morning.

Religious class for adults is conducted on every Monday evening on the Art of Living by Swamiji H. H. Sri Brahmanada Saraswathi from Kulim Diyana Mandram. The sangam provides vegetarian light food after the discourse. On every Tuesday and Wednesday evenings with the cooperation of Ananda Marga Society, the Sangam organizes Yoga for Health for all races from 7:40pm to 9:30pm. On Thursday evening the sangam conducts basic Tamil Language for adults from 7:45 pm to 9:00pm. The sangam's future plan is to focus on developing traditional Art, Music and other cultural activities to preserve our diverse identity with the hope of creating a vibrant Bangsa Malaysia.

Since 2008, the sangam has come to the aid of the less fortunate and underprivileged. In conjunction with Deepavali, poor families received hampers consisting of grocery essentials such as rice, oil, milk, noodles and biscuits as well as cash packets from the association at its premises.

== Getting there ==
The nearest bus stop is along Jalan Kebun Bunga, which is served by Rapid Penang bus 10.

== See also ==
- Sri Mahamariamman Temple, Penang
- Arulmigu Balathandayuthapani Temple, Penang
- History of Penang
- Tamil Malaysians
