= Sri Mahamariamman Temple, Penang =

Hindu temple in George Town, Penang, Malaysia

Sri Mahamariamman Temple
- Arulmigu Sri Mahamariamman Temple; Malay: Kuil Sri Mahamariamman; Tamil: அருள்மிகு ஸ்ரீ மகா மாரியம்மன் கோவில்
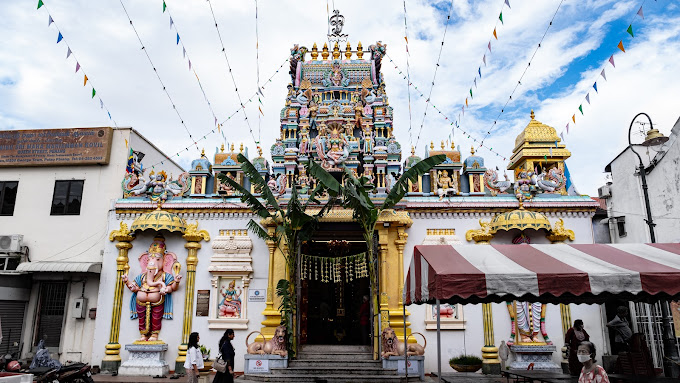

- Location within George Town

Religion
- Affiliation: Hinduism
- Deity: Mahamariamman
- Status: Active

Location
- Location: Queen Street, George Town
- State: Penang
- Country: Malaysia
- Coordinates: 5°25′2.1″N 100°20′17.736″E

Architecture
- Type: Dravidian architecture
- Creator: Unknown
- Completed: 1833

The Arulmigu Sri Mahamariamman Temple is a Hindu temple within George Town in the Malaysian state of Penang. The oldest Hindu temple in the state, it was built in 1833, and features sculptures of gods and goddesses over its main entrance and facade.

== Festivals ==
=== Navarathiri ===
Various Indian organisations and communities would sponsor the prayers for each nights. On the Final tenth day of the celebration, Vijayadashami is celebrated by Hindu Mahajana Sangam. The sangam organised the chariot procession for many years from Queen Street, Sri Mahamariamman Temple to Dhoby Ghaut. The festival celebration is concluded after shooting of arrows from the chariot in the evening in the Dhoby Ghaut. The chariot returns to the temple at about midnight the same day. Since the late 1970s, the organisation of the chariot procession had been taken over from the sangam by the Temple committee and the Hindu Endowments Board. The chariot procession is now confined to Fort Cornwallis area, nearby the Kedah Pier Muneeswarar Temple in the Esplanade. However, the sangam still continues to celebrate the annual Navarathiri festival's final tenth day Vijayadashami Ubayam every year without fail.

=== Chithra Pournami (Chitraparuvam) ===
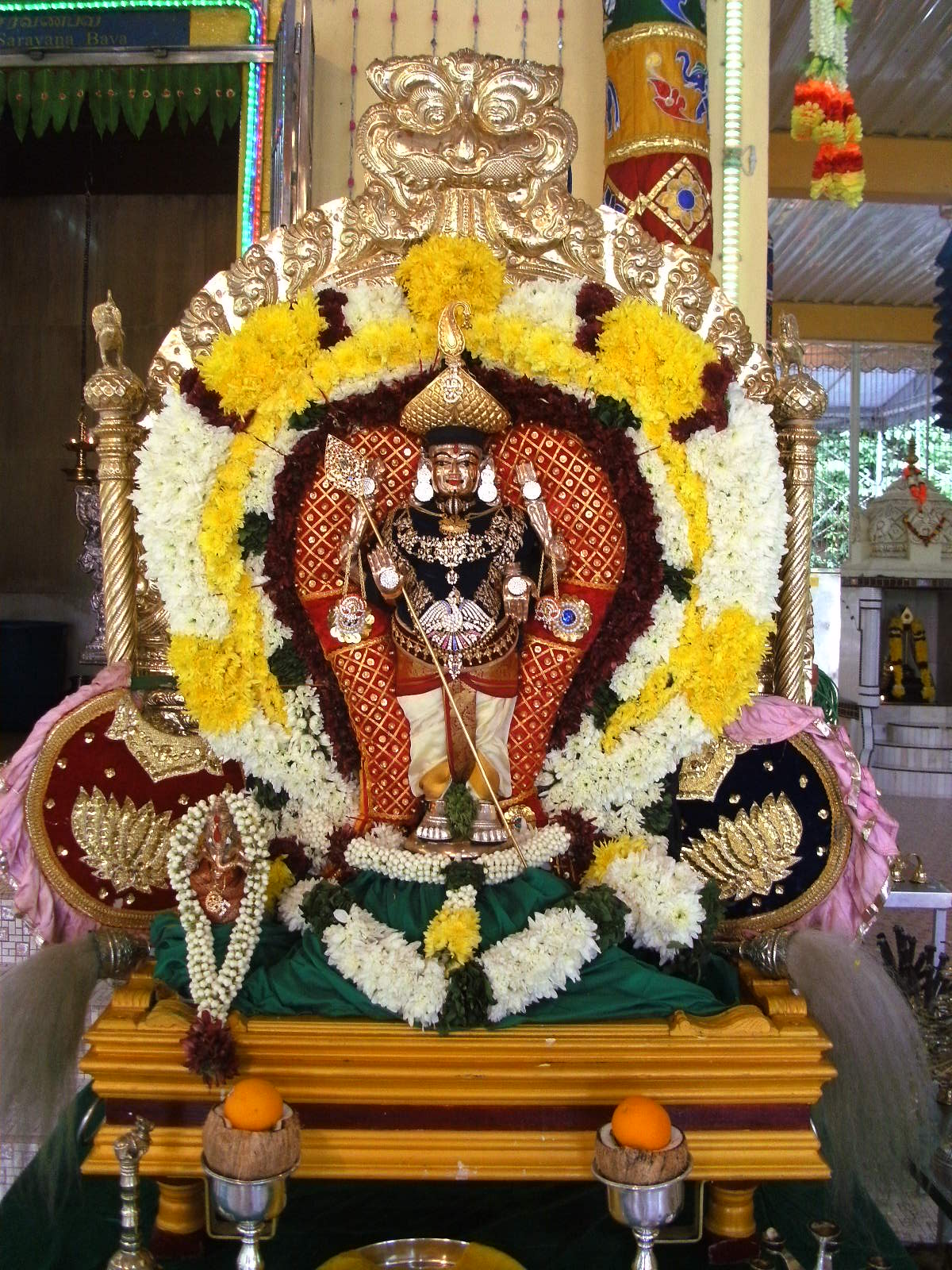
The panchaloha deity of Lord Subramaniyaswami before the procession for Chithra Pournami festival

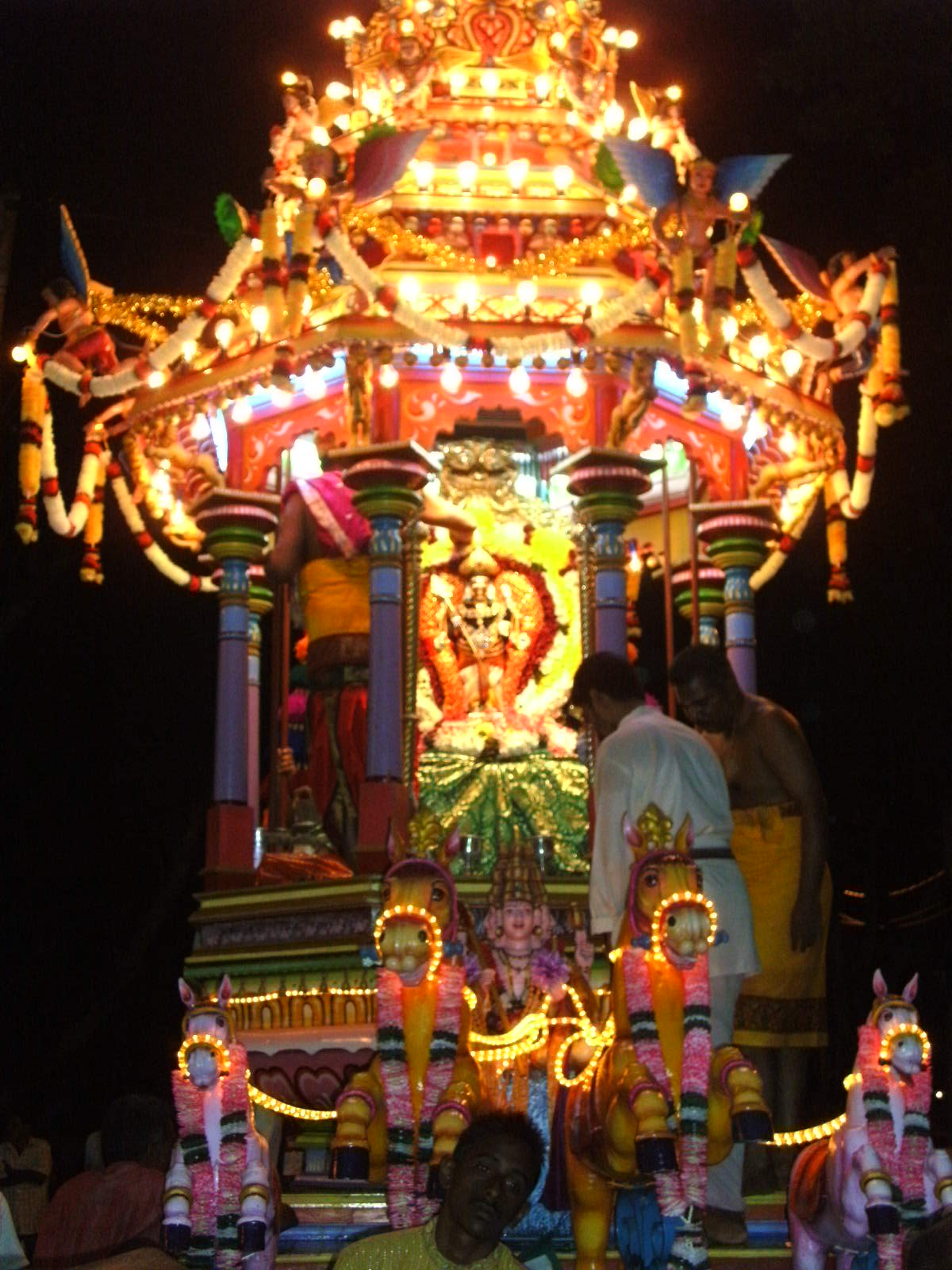
Chariot procession of Lord Subramaniyaswami for Chithra Pournami festival

The Hindu Mahajana Sangam, with notable among the festivals, the annual Chitraparuvam Festival which is celebrated in the Tamil month of Chithirai (April/May) every year, is organised with a chariot procession of the panchaloha deity of Lord Subramaniyaswami from Queen Street Sri Mahamariamman Temple. It is the day of the first full moon of the first Tamil month. In early years, the festival starts with special pooja and ubayam for the Hindu Mahajana Sangam "Koota Kadai" in Queen Street Mahamariamman Temple, the chariot procession commences in the early morning 7.00 am and reached Waterfall Dewan Mahatma Gandhi (Gandhiji Ashram) in the afternoon, the deity then carried and placed in the ashram until the return journey of the chariot to Queen Street Sri Mahamariamman temple in the evening of the same day.

Since the early 1970s this festival is celebrated for three days. The deity of Lord Subramaiyaswami is brought in procession from the Queen Street Sri Mahamariamman temple passing through many street and roads before reaching the Waterfall Arulmigu Sri Ganesha temple. The deity is carried up to the Hilltop Arulmigu Sri Balathadayuthapani Temple. On the second day is the Chitraparuvam Festival where the deity is taken in procession around the hilltop temple compound in the evening. On the third day evening, the deity is carried down and placed on the chariot procession journey back to the Queen Street Sri Mahamariamman temple. In 1992, the Hindu Mahajana Sangam imported a new chariot from India, for the annual Chitraparuvam Festival celebration to replace the old chariot which was found to be not road worthy and in a decaying condition.

== See also ==
- Hindu Mahajana Sangam
- List of Hindu temples in Malaysia
