= Om Sri Maha Athi Nageswary Amman Temple, Puchong =

Om Sri Maha Athi Nageswary Amman Temple

Religion
- Affiliation: Hinduism
- Deity: Nageswary Amman, Mariamman

Location
- Location: Puchong Gateway
- Country: Malaysia

Architecture
- Type: Dravidian architecture
- Creator: Datuk K. Rajan
- Completed: 2013 (consecrated in 2016)

The Nageswary Amman Temple, officially known as the Om Sri Maha Athi Nageswary Amman Temple, is a Hindu temple located in Puchong, Petaling District, Selangor, Malaysia. This temple was founded in 2013 by Datuk K. Rajan. It was officially consecrated in February 2016. It is revered among many other temples, for the architecture is abstract and constructed differently, with statues of various deities being featured near the entrance.

The temple is dedicated to the deity Nageswary Amman, a form of Amman. The goddess is known to be mounded on a snake, as most of the statues near the entrance are deities mounded on serpents.

== Art and architecture ==
The temple was built in the Dravidian style, and the temple features 4 gopurams, along with a total of 354 snakes carved around the temple. In addition to having other deities carved in walls of the temple, there stands a 65 feet (20 m) Shiva lingam in the center of the temple, behind the main gopuram.

== Kumbabishekam ==
The first kumbabishekam for the temple was on February 14, 2016. Around 100,000 people attended the kumbabishekam. Following the kumbabishekam, a mandalabishegam (special prayers) lasted for 48 days.
