= Sri Maha Mariamman Temple, Mount Matang =

Hindu temple in Kuching, Malaysia

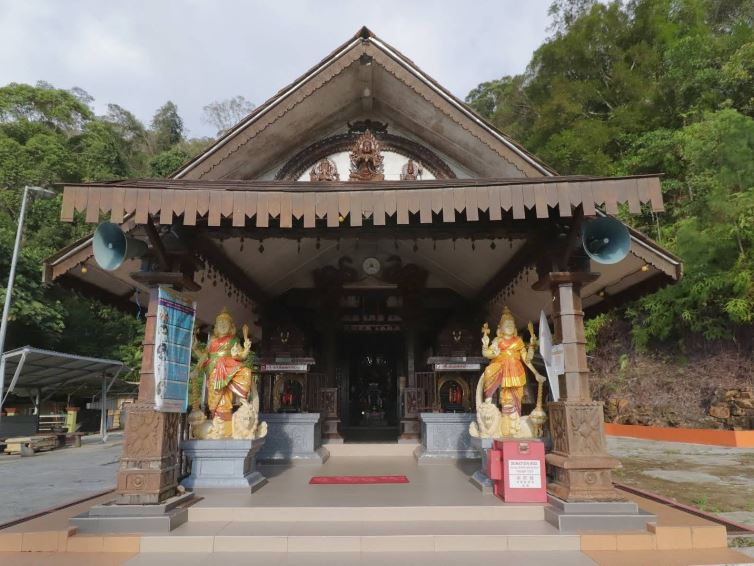

Sri Maha Mariamman Temple, Mount Matang is a Hindu temple located in Kuching, Sarawak, Malaysia.

== Establishment ==
The temple was originally established in 1897 during the period of the White Rajahs of Sarawak, in proximity to a plantation operated by the local Indian community. It later fell into disuse and remained abandoned for more than half a century.

In the years following Sarawak’s entry into the Federation of Malaysia, a Bidayuh-Melanau hunter named Abi bin Benggali reportedly rediscovered the site in the Matang jungle. The finding drew the attention of local authorities, heritage groups, as well as archaeologists and devotees.

== Restoration ==
A restoration campaign led by the local Hindu community began in 1968. The project was completed in 2011, when a poojai ceremony was held to mark the reopening of the temple.
