= Sungai Lembing =

Town in Pahang, Malaysia

- Town
- Sungai Lembing Town; Pekan Sungai Lembing
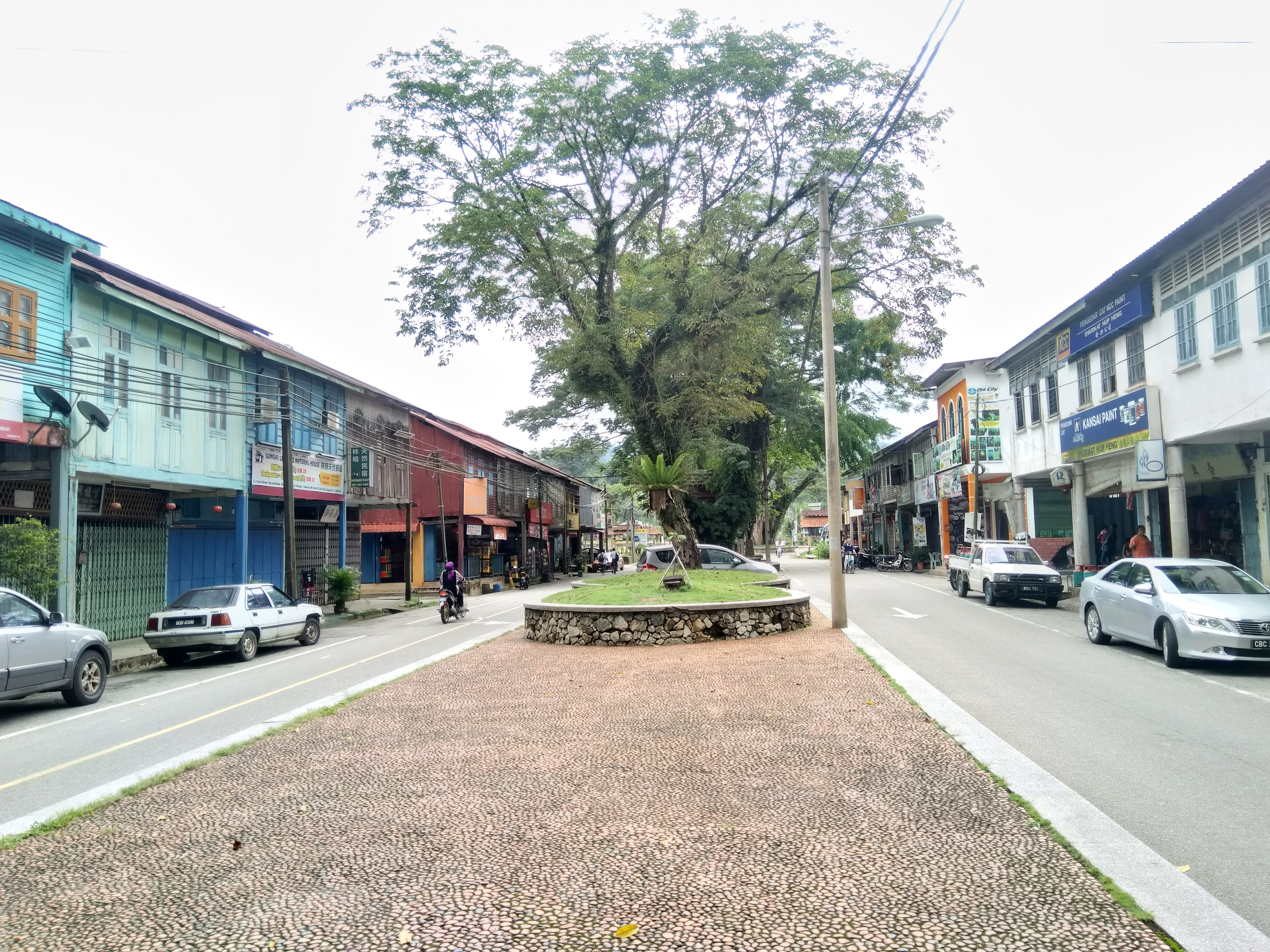
- Sungai Lembing downtown
- Etymology: Malay: Sungai Lembing (spear river)
- Nicknames: El Dorado of the East, 林明山 (Lembing Hills in Chinese)
- Location of Sungai Lembing in Pahang
- Sungai Lembing in Pahang Sungai Lembing (Malaysia) Sungai Lembing (Southeast Asia)
- Coordinates: 3°55′00.9″N 103°02′05.9″E
- Country: Malaysia
- State: Pahang Darul Makmur
- District: Kuantan District
- Founded: 1900s

Population (2014)
  - Total: 5,000
- Time zone: UTC+08:00 (MST)
- Postcode: 26200
- Telephone area code: +6-09

Sungai Lembing is a small town in Kuantan District, Pahang, Malaysia. It is about 42 km (26 miles) northwest of Kuantan. The town was founded in the 1900s as a tin mining community when the British company Pahang Consolidated Company Limited (PCCL) set up the tin mining industry there after mining activities had begun in 1886. Sungai Lembing had electricity, schools, a cinema, its own petrol station, and a hospital.

In 1926, flooding damaged caused mining activities to be suspended for three months. The Great Depression and the Japanese occupation of Malaya greatly affected the town's tin mining industry. Since the independence of Malaya, Sungai Lembing has gone into decline as global demand and prices of tin dropped, resulting in the closure of the mines in 1987. Many residents moved away, causing facilities such as shops and petrol stations to close.

After 2001, Sungai Lembing was revitalized as a heritage tourism attraction with the opening of Sungai Lembing Museum. Subsequent government investment has made this area one of the important tourist attractions in Pahang. In 2014, the town had a population of around 5,000. A large fire in 2019 raised concern for the preservation of historical buildings.

== Etymology ==
There are two suggested etymologies of the Malay name Sungai Lembing ("Spear River"). One suggestion is based on a local legend in which a ruler saw a vision of a spear in the nearby river and named his town after this vision. Another involves an incident in which a group of Orang Asli threw a spear over a deer that escaped by jumping over the Sungai Kenau ("Kenau River"). The town has been nicknamed the "El Dorado of the East" because this area is rich in natural resources.

== History ==
=== Pre-history ===
Sungai Lembing's tin mines were worked in prehistoric times, and according to historian William Linehan, may have been the source of the name "Pahang", which was the Khmer word for tin.

Unpolished Paleolithic artifacts are said to have been found in the town, remnants of a civilisation that arrived sometime in prehistory.

=== British tin mines ===
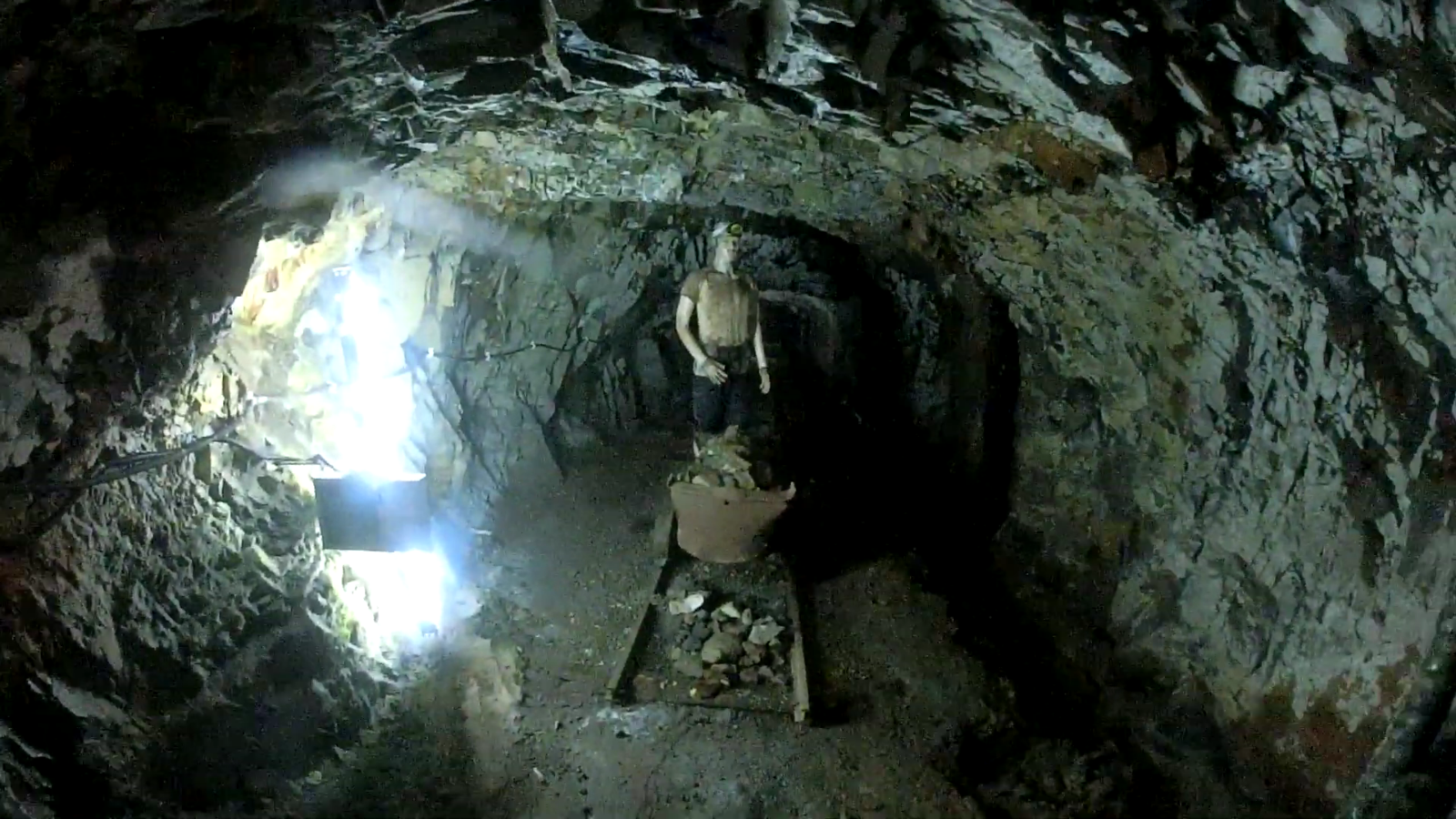
Miners transporting tin from mining tunnel

The tin mining area at Sungai Lembing was the largest and deepest of its time in the world; the tunnel spans around 322 km (200 miles) and is between 610 m (2,000 feet) and 700 m (2,300 feet) deep. Mining as an industry in the area began in 1886 by the British firm Pahang Consolidated Company Limited (PCCL), which was headquartered in London. The PCCL employed approximately 1,500 miners to mine tin. At its peak, the mine employed 5,000 workers who produced 4,000 tons of tin annually.

The development of the town to support the tin mining industry led to the creation of facilities and amenities such as electricity, housing for workers, schools, shops, a cinema and a hospital. Tin mines in Pahang and neighbouring states were the first places in Malaya to receive electricity. Initially such power was only available for 12 hours each day. Imported products were sold in a duty-free shop. Non-residents were usually not allowed to enter Sungai Lembing without permission and a security checkpoint was set up at the entrance to the town. Some buildings catering to the wealthy prohibited entry to lower class workers.

In 1926, flooding in the area caused damage to 14.5 km (9.0 miles) of railway track, a hospital and 250 homes, and the mining operation was suspended for three months. Mining was also affected by the Great Depression of the 1920s, during which quotas were imposed on tin production. During the 1942-1945 Japanese occupation of Malaya, mining stocks were hidden and mines were destroyed with flooding by British mine managers to prevent Japanese army from being able to access the tin resources, and European personnel fled the country.

=== Post independence and decline ===
After the war mining continued, and by the 1960s the town's private diesel generator was producing 7 MW, over three times more than that of the public generator in Kuantan, the nearby state capital. In 1979, PCCL transferred ownership of the company from Britain to Malaysia and renamed itself Pahang Consolidated Public Limited Company (PCPLC). As worldwide demand for tin and prices of tin fell, the mine was temporarily shut down in 1986. The closure of mines caused around 800 miners to become unemployed and the company entered receivership after financial losses. No parties were interested in taking over the mining activity and the mine was permanently closed by the Government of Pahang in 1987. After the mine closure, many residents moved elsewhere to seek employment and some facilities such as shops and petrol stations were forced to shut down, although some shops continued to operate. Prior to 2001, the area's main industry shifted from mining to agriculture; deforestation caused by this change led to flooding becoming more frequent.

In December 1988, there were proposals to revive the town, then supporting 14,000 residents, and redevelop it into a tourist attraction. One suggestion was to convert the former mining general's bungalow into either a resthouse or a museum; the bungalow was converted into the Sungai Lembing Museum. The proposals included plans to convert former workers' quarters into chalets to mitigate a lack of accommodations for visitors, improve the infrastructure in the town and open a health clinic.

=== Revitalization ===
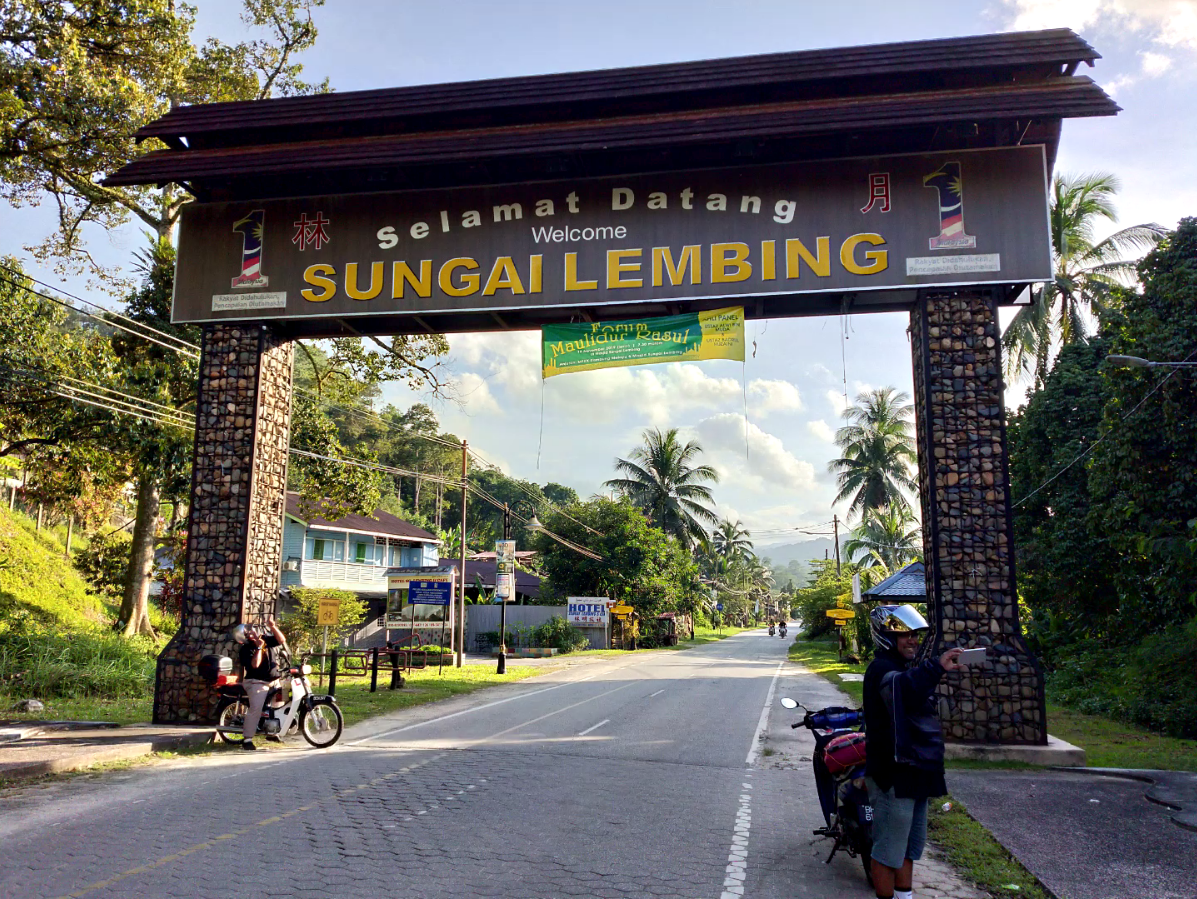
Sungai Lembing arch

The Sungai Lembing Museum was opened in 2001; this led the town to focus on the tourism sector. The museum exhibits the mining history of Sungai Lembing. It is currently managed by the Department of Museum Malaysia.

On 27 March 2004, as part of a national five-year economic plan, the federal government allocated RM 7 million for improving the town; this includes improvement to the museum, which was visited by 193,000 visitors as of 2004, revival of a mining tunnel for tourism purpose, restoration of the cinema and upgrading the road that connects the town to the tin mining area. On 16 April 2005, another RM 6.3 million was allocated to restoring buildings with historic values such as clubhouses, administration buildings, factories and mining tunnels.

Revitalisation funds were allocated to rebuild the town's central hawker centre. The 50 year old wooden building was demolished in 2006, and the new building opened on 27 September 2008. An arch was constructed at the entrance to the town on 6 February 2009. In 2012, three bridges were built would allow access from nearby settlements.

On 31 August 2019, a fire burnt several century-old buildings including 20 shophouses, 11 terrace houses and a library. The fire displaced 53 residents and resulted in the death of an elderly couple. The fire prompted the Malaysian Institute of Architects (PAM) to advise officials to upgrade safety measures on historic buildings to preserve them from destruction by fire. Residents claimed that the fire was especially destructive as most of the buildings had been made of wood, and that a lack of water hampered efforts to contain the fire. The town's water is supplied from Kuantan and is turned off at night. Four months after the fire, reconstruction of one of the damaged buildings took place with a budget of RM 10 million, with advice from Kyoto University; the money was also used to upgrade existing facilities in Sungai Lembing.

During the COVID-19 pandemic, following the relaxation of the movement control order and the re-opening of border crossings, tourism began to recover to pre-pandemic levels; 80 per cent of stalls in the food court reopened and some hostels in the area were fully booked. Most of the visitors during that time arrived by car rather than the more usual tourist buses. Despite the relaxation of the movement control order, social distancing and other infection control measures continued to be practised, and the mining tunnel and museum remained closed until 16 June 2020.

== Geography ==
=== Climate ===
Sungai Lembing's has a tropical rainforest climate, with significant rainfall occurring throughout the year. The average annual temperature is 28 °C (82 °F) and the average annual rainfall is 120.6 mm (4.75 inches). Precipitation is lowest in February, with an average of 40.7 mm (1.60 inches). With an average of 347.4 mm (13.68 inches), the most precipitation falls in December. At an average temperature of 29 °C (84 °F), May is the hottest month of the year. January and December have the lowest average temperature of the year. It is 26 °C (79 °F). In measurements taken from 2005 to 2015, between the driest and wettest months the difference in precipitation averages 306.7 mm (12.07 inches).

Climate data for Sungai Lembing
Month	Jan	Feb	Mar	Apr	May	Jun	Jul	Aug	Sep	Oct	Nov	Dec	Year
Mean daily maximum °C (°F)	30 (86)	31 (88)	32 (90)	33 (91)	33 (91)	33 (91)	33 (91)	33 (91)	33 (91)	32 (90)	31 (88)	30 (86)	33 (91)
Daily mean °C (°F)	26 (79)	27 (81)	28 (82)	28 (82)	29 (84)	28 (82)	28 (82)	28 (82)	28 (82)	28 (82)	27 (81)	26 (79)	28 (82)
Mean daily minimum °C (°F)	23 (73)	23 (73)	23 (73)	24 (75)	24 (75)	24 (75)	24 (75)	24 (75)	23 (73)	23 (73)	23 (73)	23 (73)	23 (73)
Average precipitation mm (inches)	126 (5.0)	40.7 (1.60)	68 (2.7)	57.7 (2.27)	89.6 (3.53)	70.3 (2.77)	76.5 (3.01)	103.2 (4.06)	105.2 (4.14)	167.8 (6.61)	194.7 (7.67)	347.4 (13.68)	120.6 (4.75)
Average relative humidity (%)	87	84	84	84	84	84	84	84	84	86	89	89	85
Source: timeanddate.com

=== Environmental issues ===
Since the 1990s, the frequency and intensity of floods in this area has increased due to changes in land use in the river basin area, especially an increase in agriculture and potentially due to illegal logging. One potential cause is an increase in silt in the rivers as a result of these land use changes The floods in 2012 and 2014 caused the road that connects Sungai Lembing with the rest of Malaysia to be cut off. Waste materials from abandoned mines were found to be polluting the area's rivers and groundwater with harmful elements such as arsenic, iron, copper, lead, manganese, nickel and zinc.

Since 2014, much of the rainforest surrounding the popular Rainbow Waterfall has been cleared to make way for a palm oil plantation. Local villagers blamed the pollution of their water catchment area on the logging activity involved. While the link between logging and pollution was denied by the Pahang Forestry Department in May 2018, in December 2018 several fines were issued to the Mentiga Corporation by the Pahang Department of Environment, due to substandard waste disposal practices.

== Tourism ==
As of July 2017, locals estimated around 2,000 to 3,000 tourists visited the town on every weekend, and the number peaks during school holidays in both Malaysia and Singapore. In addition to the Sungai Lembing Museum and mining tunnel, the area's tourist attractions include a museum dedicated to crystals, a hot spring, Panorama Hill, and Rainbow Waterfall. Places of worship include Gua Charas, where Buddhist and Hindu temples were located inside a cave.

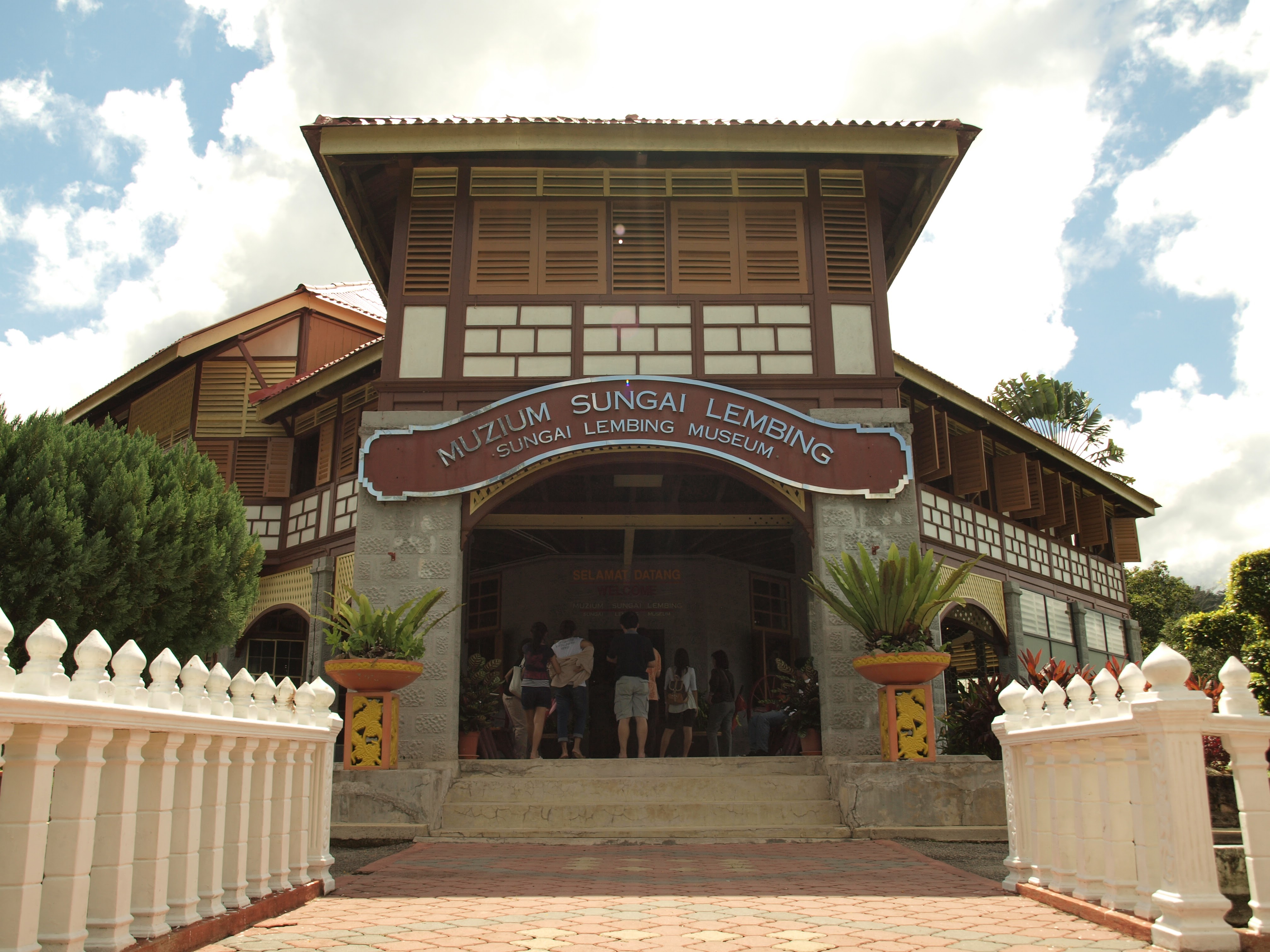
Sungai Lembing Museum

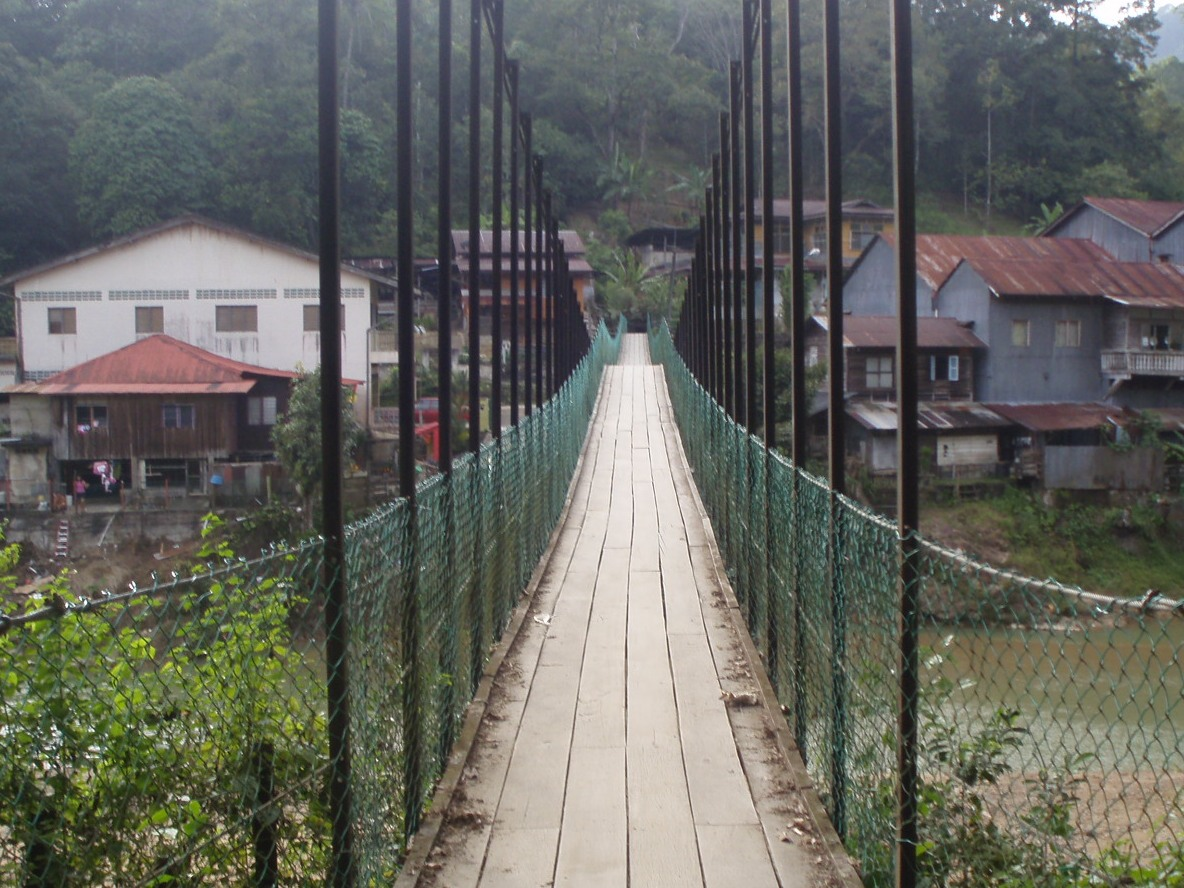
Kolong Pahat bridge

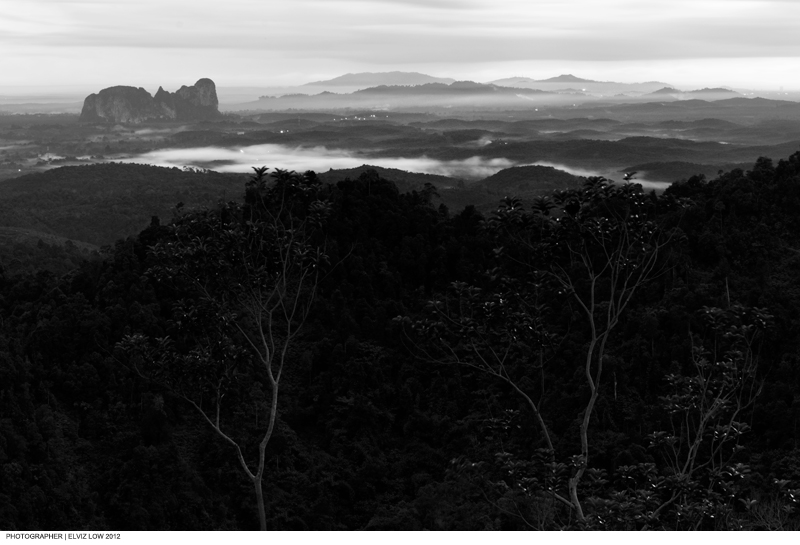
Panorama Hill, with Gua Charas (left) in the background

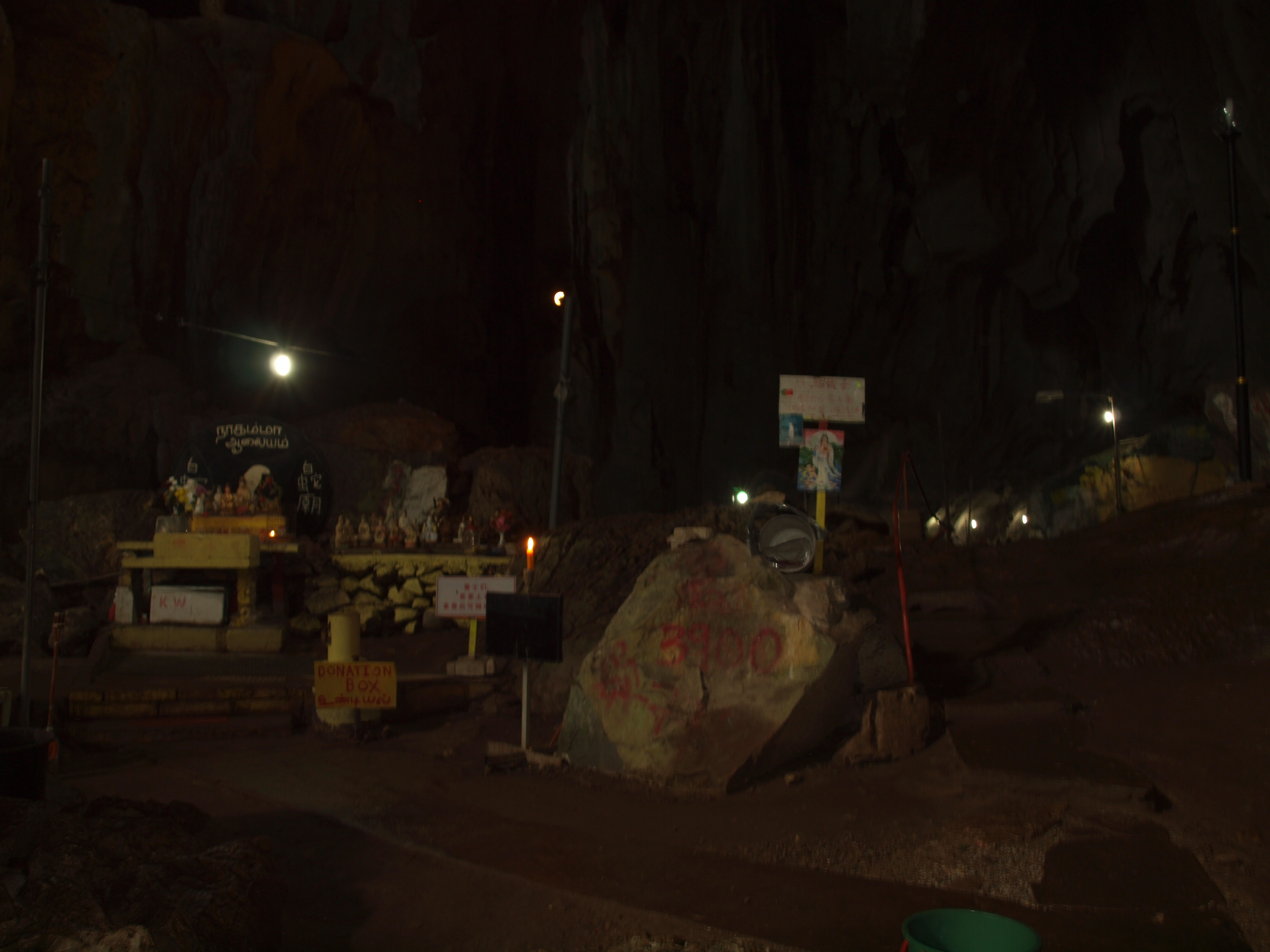
Gua Charas

== In popular culture ==
- A Malaysian-Singaporean co-produced drama, Kampong Ties is set in Sungai Lembing during 1960s and 1970s.
- Pontianak Harum Sundal Malam 2, a Malaysian horror film, was filmed in Sungai Lembing in November 2004.
