= List of secondary schools in Penang =

Malaysian schools

As of 2017, there are 589 schools in Penang.

== Secondary schools ==
=== National Daily Secondary Schools ===
School Code	School name	Postcode	Area	Coordinates
PEA1091	SMK (P) Sri Mutiara	10460	George Town	5.4105°N 100.3080°E
PEA1090	SMK Abdullah Munshi	10460	George Town	5.4089°N 100.3123°E
PEA1094	SMK Air Itam	11500	George Town	5.3958°N 100.2875°E
PEA0008	SMK Alma	14000	Bukit Mertajam	5.3335°N 100.4590°E
PEA2083	SMK Bagan Jaya	13400	Butterworth	5.4277°N 100.3920°E
PEE2056	SMK Bakti	13300	Tasek Gelugor	5.4849°N 100.4923°E
PEA0012	SMK Bandar Baru Perda	14000	Bukit Mertajam	5.3730°N 100.4311°E
PEA4009	SMK Bandar Tasek Mutiara	14120	Simpang Ampat	5.2754°N 100.4980°E
PEA4008	SMK Batu Kawan	14110	Simpang Ampat	5.2728°N 100.4330°E
PEA3035	SMK Batu Maung	11960	Bayan Lepas	5.2821°N 100.2860°E
PEA3039	SMK Bayan Lepas	11900	Bayan Lepas	5.2855°N 100.2578°E
PEA0002	SMK Berapit	14000	Bukit Mertajam	5.3768°N 100.4720°E
PEA2086	SMK Bertam Indah	13200	Kepala Batas	5.5243°N 100.4360°E
PEA2092	SMK Bertam Perdana	13200	Kepala Batas	5.5304°N 100.4670°E
PEA1093	SMK Bukit Gambir	11700	Gelugor	5.3703°N 100.2974°E
PEA1212	SMK Bukit Jambul	11700	Gelugor	5.3487°N 100.2909°E
PEE0040	SMK Bukit Mertajam	14000	Bukit Mertajam	5.3506°N 100.4710°E
PEA2088	SMK Dato' Haji Hassan Noh	13100	Penaga	5.5511°N 100.3784°E
PEA2058	SMK Dato' Kailan	13200	Kepala Batas	5.5387°N 100.4680°E
PEA2054	SMK Datuk Haji Ahmad Badawi	13200	Kepala Batas	5.5076°N 100.4290°E
PEA2052	SMK Datuk Haji Ahmad Said	13800	Butterworth	5.4444°N 100.4320°E
PEB2061	SMK Datuk Hj Abdul Kadir	13200	Kepala Batas	5.5146°N 100.4310°E
PEE1101	SMK Datuk Hj. Mohamed Nor Ahmad	11700	Gelugor	5.3711°N 100.3047°E
PEA2053	SMK Datuk Onn	13000	Butterworth	5.4482°N 100.3820°E
PEA2090	SMK Gemilang	13050	Butterworth	5.4994°N 100.3820°E
PEB1102	SMK Georgetown	11600	George Town	5.3994°N 100.2993°E
PEA0003	SMK Guar Perahu	14400	Bukit Mertajam	5.4211°N 100.4670°E
PEA0018	SMK Guar Perahu Indah	14400	Bukit Mertajam	5.4264°N 100.4710°E
PEA1210	SMK Hamid Khan	11700	Gelugor	5.3814°N 100.3030°E
PEB0043	SMK Jalan Damai	14000	Bukit Mertajam	5.3408°N 100.4740°E
PEA4005	SMK Jawi	14200	Sungai Jawi	5.1956°N 100.4893°E
PEE1104	SMK Jelutong	11600	George Town	5.3898°N 100.3104°E
PEB2060	SMK Kampong Kastam	12300	Butterworth	5.4252°N 100.3788°E
PEA2085	SMK Kampong Selamat	13300	Tasek Gelugor	5.4985°N 100.5216°E
PEA2087	SMK Kepala Batas	13200	Kepala Batas	5.5021°N 100.4361°E
PEA0017	SMK Machang Bubuk	14020	Bukit Mertajam	5.3283°N 100.5010°E
PEA2082	SMK Mak Mandin	13400	Butterworth	5.4206°N 100.3900°E
PEA0009	SMK Mengkuang	14000	Bukit Mertajam	5.4037°N 100.4900°E
PEA4004	SMK Mutiara Impian	14100	Simpang Ampat	5.2743°N 100.4777°E
PEE1115	SMK Padang Polo	10450	George Town	5.4193°N 100.3060°E
PEA0013	SMK Pauh Jaya	13700	Perai	5.3758°N 100.4159°E
PEE0041	SMK Penanti	14400	Kubang Semang	5.4048°N 100.4690°E
PEA0001	SMK Perai	13700	Perai	5.3775°N 100.3970°E
PEA0010	SMK Permai Indah	14000	Bukit Mertajam	5.3302°N 100.4430°E
PEA0016	SMK Permatang Pasir	13500	Permatang Pauh	5.4200°N 100.4405°E
PEA0005	SMK Permatang Rawa	14000	Bukit Mertajam	5.3697°N 100.4470°E
PEA2051	SMK Permatang Tok Jaya (Special Model Schools (SK+SMK))	13800	Butterworth	5.4714°N 100.4040°E
PEA2084	SMK Pokok Sena	13220	Kepala Batas	5.4919°N 100.4610°E
PEA3038	SMK Pondok Upeh	11000	Balik Pulau	5.3351°N 100.2204°E
PEA3033	SMK Raja Tun Uda	11950	Bayan Lepas	5.3201°N 100.2820°E
PEA0006	SMK Sama Gagah	13500	Permatang Pauh	5.4208°N 100.4087°E
PEA4007	SMK Saujana Indah	14300	Nibong Tebal	5.1516°N 100.4870°E
PEA0004	SMK Seberang Jaya	13700	Perai	5.4028°N 100.4000°E
PEA3034	SMK Seri Balik Pulau	11020	Balik Pulau	5.3355°N 100.2130°E
PEA3037	SMK Seri Bayu	11920	Bayan Lepas	5.2903°N 100.2230°E
PEA4003	SMK Seri Nibong	14300	Nibong Tebal	5.1713°N 100.4700°E
PEE4035	SMK Simpang Empat	14100	Simpang Ampat	5.2791°N 100.4760°E
PEA2055	SMK Sri Muda	13100	Penaga	5.5336°N 100.3800°E
PEA4001	SMK Sungai Acheh	14310	Nibong Tebal	5.1487°N 100.4596°E
PEB3038	SMK Sungai Ara	11900	Bayan Lepas	5.3190°N 100.2710°E
PEA1213	SMK Sungai Nibong	11900	Bayan Lepas	5.3349°N 100.2950°E
PEA0007	SMK Taman Inderawasih	13600	Perai	5.3894°N 100.3860°E
PEA0015	SMK Taman Perwira	14100	Simpang Ampat	5.2964°N 100.4770°E
PEA0011	SMK Taman Sejahtera	14000	Bukit Mertajam	5.3347°N 100.4914°E
PEA4006	SMK Taman Widuri	14200	Sungai Jawi	5.2020°N 100.5288°E
PEE1092	SMK Tanjong Bunga	11200	Tanjung Bungah	5.4579°N 100.2930°E
PEA4010	SMK Tasek	14120	Simpang Ampat	5.2778°N 100.5040°E
PEA2093	SMK Tasek Gelugor	13300	Tasek Gelugor	5.4783°N 100.4858°E
PEA2057	SMK Telok Air Tawar	13050	Butterworth	5.4799°N 100.3820°E
PEA1211	SMK Telok Kumbar	11920	Bayan Lepas	5.2875°N 100.2410°E
PEA3036	SMK Teluk Bahang	11050	Teluk Bahang	5.4503°N 100.2140°E
PEB0042	SMK Tinggi Bukit Mertajam (Bukit Mertajam High School)	14000	Bukit Mertajam	5.3589°N 100.4596°E
PEA0014	SMK Tun Hussein Onn	13700	Perai	5.3893°N 100.4064°E
PEE4036	SMK Tun Syed Sheh Barakbah	14200	Sungai Jawi	5.2111°N 100.5010°E
PEE4037	SMK Tunku Abdul Rahman	14300	Nibong Tebal	5.1673°N 100.4860°E
PEB1112	SMK Tunku Puan Habsah	10450	George Town	5.4208°N 100.3080°E
PEA4002	SMK Valdor	14200	Sungai Jawi	5.2379°N 100.4921°E
PEB1114	SMK Westlands	10400	George Town	5.4223°N 100.3186°E

==== Missionary National Secondary Schools ====
School Code	English name	Malay Name	Postcode	Area	Coordinates
PEB1094	Penang Free School	Penang Free School	11600	George Town	5.4032°N 100.3048°E
PEB1106	Methodist Boys' School	SMK (L) Methodist	10460	George Town	5.4106°N 100.3060°E
PEB1107	Methodist Girls' School	SMK (P) Methodist	10400	George Town	5.4190°N 100.3224°E
PEB1109	St. George's Girls' School	SMK (P) St George	10450	George Town	5.4219°N 100.3077°E
PEB0044	Convent Bukit Mertajam	SMK Convent (M) Bukit Mertajam	14000	Bukit Mertajam	5.3587°N 100.4650°E
PEB2059	Convent Butterworth	SMK Convent Butterworth	12100	Butterworth	5.3963°N 100.3680°E
PEB1097	Convent Green Lane	SMK Convent Green Lane	11600	George Town	5.3965°N 100.3040°E
PEB1099	Convent Light Street	SMK Convent Lebuh Light	10200	George Town	5.4218°N 100.3386°E
PEB1100	Convent Pulau Tikus	SMK Convent Pulau Tikus	10250	George Town	5.4331°N 100.3087°E
PEB4038	Methodist Nibong Tebal	SMK Methodist	14300	Nibong Tebal	5.1711°N 100.4777°E
PEB2062	St. Mark High School	SMK St Mark	13000	Butterworth	5.4500°N 100.3853°E
PEB1110	St. Xavier's Institution	SMK St Xavier	10200	George Town	5.4207°N 100.3370°E

==== National-type Chinese Secondary Schools ====
School Code	English name	Chinese name	Postcode	Area	Coordinates	Logo
PEB1095	Chung Hwa Confucian High School	孔圣庙中华国民型华文中学	11600	George Town	5.3908°N 100.3010°E	
PEB1096	Chung Ling High School	槟城锺灵国民型华文中学	11400	George Town	5.4038°N 100.2953°E	
PEA2056	Chung Ling Butterworth High School	北海锺灵国民型华文中学	13400	Butterworth	5.4339°N 100.3930°E	
PEB1098	Convent Datuk Keramat	柑仔园修道院国民型华文中学	10150	George Town	5.4123°N 100.3178°E	
PEB1103	Heng Ee High School	恒毅国民型华文中学	11600	George Town	5.4015°N 100.3094°E	
PEB1103	Heng Ee High School; Bayan Baru Branch	恒毅国民型华文中学峇央峇鲁分校	11900	Bayan Lepas	5.3036°N 100.2725°E	
PEB0045	Jit Sin High School	日新国民型华文中学	14000	Bukit Mertajam	5.3436°N 100.4460°E	
PEA4011	Jit Sin High School II SPS	威南日新国民型华文中学	14120	Simpang Ampat	5.2730°N 100.5145°E	
PEB1093	Penang Chinese Girls' High School	槟华女子国民型华文中学	10350	George Town	5.4336°N 100.3020°E	
PEB1108	Phor Tay High School	菩提国民型华文中学	11900	Bayan Lepas	5.3432°N 100.2960°E	
PEB3036	Sacred Heart High School	圣心国民型华文中学	11000	Balik Pulau	5.3523°N 100.2370°E	
PEB1113	Union High School	协和国民型华文中学	10450	George Town	5.4151°N 100.3026°E	

=== Fully Residential School ===
Name	Postcode	Area	Coordinates
SM Sains Kepala Batas	13200	Kepala Batas	5.5180°N 100.4670°E
SM Sains Tun Syed Sheh Shahabuddin	14000	Bukit Mertajam	5.3428°N 100.4760°E

=== MARA Junior Science Colleges ===
Name	Postcode	Area	Coordinates
MRSM Balik Pulau	11000	Balik Pulau	5.3313°N 100.2290°E
MRSM Tun Abdullah Ahmad Badawi	13200	Kepala Batas	5.5221°N 100.4730°E
MRSM Transkrian	14300	Nibong Tebal	5.1542°N 100.4840°E

=== National Sport Secondary Schools ===
Name	Postcode	Area	Coordinates
SMK Mutiara Impian (Penang Sport School)	14100	Simpang Ampat	5.2740°N 100.4780°E

=== Sixth form college (Kolej Tingkatan 6) ===
Name	Postcode	Area	Coordinates
KT6 Desa Murni	13800	Butterworth	5.4475°N 100.4330°E
KT6 Haji Zainul Abidin	11600	George Town	5.3982°N 100.3060°E
KT6 Hutchings	10200	George Town	5.4202°N 100.3387°E

=== Vocational Secondary Schools ===
Name	Postcode	Area	Coordinates
KV Balik Pulau	11000	Balik Pulau	5.3383°N 100.2180°E
KV Batu Lanchang	11600	George Town	5.4007°N 100.2980°E
KV Butterworth	13050	Butterworth	5.4738°N 100.3840°E
KV Nibong Tebal	14300	Nibong Tebal	5.1659°N 100.4960°E
KV Seberang Perai	14000	Bukit Mertajam	5.3278°N 100.4410°E

==== Technical/Vocational Secondary Schools ====
Name	Postcode	Area	Coordinates
SM Teknik Tunku Abd Rahman	11400	George Town	5.4043°N 100.3010°E

=== Religious Secondary Schools ===
==== Islamic National Secondary Schools (SMKA) ====
Name	Postcode	Area	Coordinates
SMKA (L) Al-Mashoor	10460	George Town	5.4098°N 100.3030°E
SMKA (P) Al-Mashoor	10250	George Town	5.4278°N 100.3170°E
SMKA Al-Irshad	13220	Kepala Batas	5.4906°N 100.4590°E
SMKA Nibong Tebal	14300	Nibong Tebal	5.1448°N 100.4780°E

==== Islamic Government-Aided Secondary Schools (SABK) ====
Name	Postcode	Area	Type	Coordinates
Maahad Al-Imam An-Nawawi	13200	Kepala Batas	Religious Secondary Schools	5.5565°N 100.4040°E
Maahad Tahfiz Al-quran Faqiah Daimiah	13500	Permatang Pauh	National Religious Secondary Schools	5.4013°N 100.4150°E
Madrasah Khairiah Islamiah	13220	Kepala Batas	Religious Secondary Schools	5.4849°N 100.4530°E
Maktab Wan Jah	12200	Butterworth	Religious Secondary Schools	5.4136°N 100.3730°E
SM Al-Itqan	11920	Bayan Lepas	Religious Secondary Schools	5.2955°N 100.2240°E
SM Islam Al-Masriyah	14000	Bukit Mertajam	National Religious Secondary Schools	5.3735°N 100.4640°E
SMA Al-Ahmadiah Al-Ijtimaiah	14000	Bukit Mertajam	National Religious Secondary Schools	5.3660°N 100.4450°E
SMA Daeratul Ma'arifil Wataniah Satu	13200	Kepala Batas	Religious Secondary Schools	5.5147°N 100.4240°E
SMA Daeratul Maarifil Wataniah 2	14400	Kubang Semang	National Religious Secondary Schools	5.4295°N 100.4710°E
SMA Faqiah Daimiah	13500	Permatang Pauh	National Religious Secondary Schools	5.4014°N 100.4150°E
SMA Maahad Al Mashoor Al Islami	11000	Balik Pulau	Religious Secondary Schools	5.3311°N 100.2130°E
SMA Tarbiah Islamiah	10150	George Town	Religious Secondary Schools	5.4074°N 100.3200°E

=== Special Education Secondary Schools ===
Name	Postcode	Area	Coordinates
Federal Special Education National Secondary School	11200	Tanjung Bungah	5.4579°N 100.2790°E

== Private schools ==
=== Chinese Independent High Schools ===
English name	Chinese name	Postcode	Area	Coordinates	Logo
Chung Ling (Private) High School	槟城锺灵独立中学	11400	Ayer Itam	5.4038°N 100.2940°E	
Han Chiang High School	韩江中学	11600	Jelutong	5.4069°N 100.3050°E	
Jit Sin Independent High School	日新独立中学	14000	Bukit Mertajam	5.3642°N 100.4650°E	
Penang Chinese Girls' Private High School	槟华女子独立中学	10350	George Town	5.4343°N 100.3010°E	
Phor Tay Private High School	菩提独立中学	12200	Jelutong	5.4383°N 100.3060°E	

=== International schools ===
Name	Postcode	Area	Coordinates
Dalat International School	11200	Tanjung Bungah	5.4667°N 100.2900°E
Fairview International School	11900	Bayan Lepas	5.3459°N 100.2750°E
GEMS International School	14120	Simpang Ampat	5.2782°N 100.4900°E
Prince of Wales Island International School	11000	Balik Pulau	5.3679°N 100.2200°E
Ideas International Secondary School	11700	Sungai Dua	5.3504°N 100.2960°E
Straits International School	11960	Bayan Baru	5.3289°N 100.2840°E
Tenby International School	11200	Tanjung Bungah	5.4574°N 100.2820°E
Sri Tenby Secondary School	11200	Tanjung Bungah	5.4582°N 100.2820°E
The International School of Penang (Uplands)	11100	Batu Ferringgi	5.4699°N 100.2490°E
Pelita International School	11200	Tanjung Bungah	5.4607°N 100.3000°E

==== Expatriates schools ====
School Code	School name	Postcode	Area	Origin Region	Coordinates
PVSB001	Penang Japanese School（ペナン日本人学校）	11600	Jelutong	Japan	5.4087°N 100.3180°E

=== People's Religious Schools ===
Name	Postcode	Area	Coordinates
Sekolah Rendah Islam Masjid Negeri	11400	George Town	5.4061°N 100.3010°E
Kafa Integrasi Darul Quran	11800		5.3531°N 100.3010°E
Sekolah Rendah Islam Hajjah Salmah	10150		5.4075°N 100.3210°E
Sekolah Rendah Agama Tuan Guru	10470		5.4593°N 100.3060°E
Madrasah Nurul Hidayah Fasa 1	11500	Ayer Itam	5.3946°N 100.2890°E
Sar Darul Iman	11500		5.3892°N 100.2770°E
Madrasah Murad Ad-diniyyah	11700	Gelugor	5.3693°N 100.3040°E
Wisma Yatim Perempuan Islam			5.4112°N 100.3030°E
Sekolah Agama Tarbiah Islamiah			5.3794°N 100.3070°E
Madrasah Al-hidayah Ad-diniah	11000	Balik Pulau	5.3534°N 100.2100°E
Madrasah Al-ittihad Al-islamiah	11000	Balik Pulau	5.3919°N 100.2100°E
Madrasah Raiyah Islamiah	11010	Balik Pulau	5.3995°N 100.2110°E
Madrasah Tarbiah Tarikah Diniah	11010	Balik Pulau	5.3731°N 100.2120°E
Sekolah Pendidikan Islam Kampung Perlis	11000	Balik Pulau	5.3185°N 100.2050°E
Sekolah Pendidikan Islam Kampung Terang	11000	Balik Pulau	5.3235°N 100.2110°E
Sra At-tarbiah Al-islamiah	11050	Balik Pulau	5.4588°N 100.2100°E
Madrasah Tarbiyyah Dinniah	11010	Balik Pulau	5.3489°N 100.2310°E
Sar Ridwaniah	11920	Bayan Lepas	5.2856°N 100.2410°E
Sar Masjid Jamek Batu Maung	11960	Bayan Lepas	5.2815°N 100.2840°E
Madrasah Tamil Muslim Telok Bahang			5.4586°N 100.2070°E
Tahfiz Darul Furqan	11010	Balik Pulau	5.3833°N 100.2170°E
Madrasah Al-hidayah Al-adiniyah Jalan Bharu			5.3571°N 100.2110°E
Sa Titi Teras			5.3565°N 100.2230°E
Madrasah Hidayatul Islamiah	11020	Balik Pulau	5.3069°N 100.2030°E
Madrasah Tarbiyah Islamiah Sungai Burung	11000	Balik Pulau	5.3418°N 100.2080°E
SA Sungai Rusa			5.3851°N 100.2130°E
Sar Pondok Upeh	11000	Balik Pulau	5.3379°N 100.2310°E
Sekolah Didikan Agama Islam Kampung Paya	11000	Balik Pulau	5.3355°N 100.2180°E
Madrasah Khairiah Islamiah	11920	Bayan Lepas	5.2946°N 100.2560°E
Sa Madrasah			5.3498°N 100.2270°E
Al-nusyu Wal Irtiqa'	13300	Tasek Gelugor	5.4684°N 100.4580°E
Sekolah Islam Hidayatul Nur	13800	Butterworth	5.4456°N 100.4290°E
Madrasah Saadatul Darain	13200	Kepala Batas	5.4848°N 100.4260°E
Maahad Al-samadani	13200	Tasek Gelugor	5.4682°N 100.4290°E
Tarbiyatul Banin Wal Banat	13200	Kepala Batas	5.4627°N 100.4330°E
Maahad Taqaddum Al Watani	13200	Kepala Batas	5.5004°N 100.4270°E
Sekolah Rendah Islam At-taqwa	13200	Kepala Batas	5.5240°N 100.4350°E
Madrasah Darul Maarif	13200	Kepala Batas	5.5380°N 100.4150°E
Madrasah At-tahzibiah Ad-diniah Islamiah	12300	Butterworth	5.4246°N 100.3790°E
Kelas Bimbingan Quran Dan Tajwid			5.5389°N 100.4310°E
Sar Misbahul Falah	13300	Tasek Gelugor	5.4834°N 100.5060°E
Taman Didikan Islam	13310	Tasek Gelugor	5.4527°N 100.4790°E
Sekolah Agama Rakyat Al-ridwan	13300	Tasek Gelugor	5.4626°N 100.4490°E
Sekolah Rendah Islam Ar-rahman	13310	Tasek Gelugor	5.4568°N 100.4930°E
Sar Al-khairiah			5.5186°N 100.4020°E
Sa Al-falah Wan Najah			5.4900°N 100.4000°E
Madrasah Saadah Al-darani	13200	Kepala Batas	5.5379°N 100.4570°E
Sekolah Rendah Agama Al-falah	13050	Butterworth	5.4999°N 100.3800°E
Sar Al-hidayah Lahar Tiang			5.5491°N 100.4790°E
Madrasah Tarbiah Ibtidaiyah	13300	Tasek Gelugor	5.5292°N 100.5220°E
Madrasatul Tarbiyatul Islamiah	13110	Penaga	5.5679°N 100.3590°E
Madrasah Tahzibiah Islamiah	13300	Tasek Gelugor	5.4729°N 100.4840°E
Madrasatul Islamiah As-sharifiah	13300	Tasek Gelugor	5.4868°N 100.4760°E
Al Makhadul Huda	13200	Kepala Batas	5.4850°N 100.4530°E
Madrasah Ad Diniah Al-islamiah	13800	Butterworth	5.4616°N 100.4010°E
Madrasatul Ibtidaiyah	13100	Penaga	5.5279°N 100.3940°E
Sar Simpang Tiga			5.4748°N 100.5090°E
Madrasah Al Isyadatul Atfal	13300	Tasek Gelugor	5.5033°N 100.4830°E
Madrasah Ibtidaiyah	13300	Tasek Gelugor	5.4822°N 100.4930°E
Madrasah Al-yatimiah Al-islamiah	13300	Tasek Gelugor	5.5183°N 100.5070°E
Sekolah Agama Rakyat Darul Hikmah	13050	Butterworth	5.4506°N 100.3810°E
Sar Tarbiatul Al-islamiah	14300	Nibong Tebal	5.1324°N 100.4800°E
Maahad Al-ihsaniah (Manhal)	14110		5.2820°N 100.4750°E
Sekolah Rendah Agama Nurul Falah	14300	Nibong Tebal	5.1732°N 100.4740°E
Sekolah Rendah Agama An-najah	14300	Nibong Tebal	5.1409°N 100.4900°E
Madrasah Al-irsyadiah	14310	Nibong Tebal	5.1486°N 100.4210°E
Sar Sungai Bakap			5.2216°N 100.4970°E
Madrasah Al-falah	14320	Nibong Tebal	5.1245°N 100.4180°E
Sekolah Rendah Masjid Hj. Saad	14000	Bukit Mertajam	5.3784°N 100.4660°E
Madrasah Nahdatul Hasanah	13700	Seberang Jaya	5.3942°N 100.4050°E
Madrasah Tarbiah Islamiah	13700	Seberang Jaya	5.4036°N 100.4030°E
Sar Saidina Abu Bakar As-sidek	14400	Bukit Mertajam	5.4302°N 100.4780°E
Madrasah Al-aminiah	13500	Bukit Mertajam	5.3867°N 100.4250°E
Sekolah Pendidikan Islam (Sedhar) Alma Jaya	14000	Bukit Mertajam	5.3258°N 100.4810°E
Sekolah Rendah Islam Attarbiyatul Islamiyah	14000	Bukit Mertajam	5.3322°N 100.4500°E
Sra Tarbiah Islamiah Kampung Pelet	14400	Bukit Mertajam	5.4119°N 100.4630°E
Sekolah Rendah Agama Al-maahadul Islami	14120	Simpang Ampat	5.2957°N 100.5270°E
Sekolah Rendah Islam Manabi'ul Ulum	14400	Bukit Mertajam	5.4072°N 100.4740°E
Maahad Tahfiz Ibnu Sina		Bukit Mertajam	5.3663°N 100.4200°E
Sekolah Rendah Islam Bahrul Ulum	14400	Bukit Mertajam	5.4098°N 100.4090°E
Madrasah Manabiul Ulum	14000	Bukit Mertajam	5.4243°N 100.5110°E
Sekolah Rendah Islam Tuan Abdullah	14000	Bukit Mertajam	5.3888°N 100.4640°E
Sekolah Ugama Rahmmaniah	13500		5.4218°N 100.4360°E
Maahad Tahfiz Akademi Al-quran As-syamil (Aqsa)	14000	Bukit Mertajam	5.3387°N 100.4940°E
Madrasah Tarbiyyah Islamiah Machang Bubok	14000	Bukit Mertajam	5.3390°N 100.5140°E
SMA Al Maahadul Islami Tasek Junjung	14120	Simpang Ampat	5.2961°N 100.5270°E
Sra Guar Perahu			5.4316°N 100.4650°E
Sar Madrasah Al Whusta	13100	Penaga	5.5058°N 100.4080°E
Sar Permatang Tok Bidan			5.4726°N 100.4050°E
Sekolah Agama Rakyat Bagan Belat			5.4918°N 100.3800°E
Kelas Didikan Agama Islam	14000	Bukit Mertajam	5.3306°N 100.4730°E
Madrasah Miftahul Irfan	11000	Balik Pulau	5.3918°N 100.2090°E
Sekolah Rendah Islam Al-ansar	11010	Balik Pulau	5.3709°N 100.2030°E
Ma'had Tahfiz Manahilil Irfan	11960	Bayan Lepas	5.2868°N 100.2800°E
Sekolah Rendah Agama Tuan Hj. Omar B. Hassan	11960	Bayan Lepas	5.2748°N 100.2660°E
Sekolah Agama Rakyat Al-khairiah	11909	Bayan Lepas	5.3125°N 100.2710°E
Maahad Tahfiz Al-faqiha	10450		5.4144°N 100.3090°E
Ma'had Tahfiz Al-quran Kasyfu Al-ulum	11200	Tanjung Bungah	5.4693°N 100.2780°E
Madrasah Darul Ulum Al-hashimiyyah	11400	Ayer Itam	5.4115°N 100.2880°E
Madrasah Tahfiz Al-quranul Karim Baitul Irfan	11700		5.3732°N 100.3050°E
Maahad Tahfiz Al-quran Fathur Rahman	11600	Jelutong	5.3932°N 100.3140°E
Madrasah Tarbiyyah Nurul Islam	10050	George Town	5.4201°N 100.3290°E
Madrasah Darul Ulum Daudiyah	10050	George Town	5.4213°N 100.3290°E
Sekolah Agama Rakyat Nurul Hidayah	11060	Ayer Itam	5.3868°N 100.2780°E
Madrasah Uthmaniah (Abim)	11700	Gelugor	5.3691°N 100.3120°E
Madrasah Tahfiz Darul Ukasha	11700	Gelugor	5.3755°N 100.3080°E
Madrasah Irsyad Al Asyraf Al Wataniah	14200	Jawi	5.2226°N 100.4920°E
Sekolah Menengah Islam Ad Diniah	14200	Jawi	5.2073°N 100.5390°E
Madrasah Ad Diniah Islamiah	14200	Jawi	5.2284°N 100.4930°E
Akademi Tahfiz Mutiara	14120	Simpang Ampat	5.2840°N 100.4820°E
Sekolah Rendah Agama Al Ihsaniah	14100	Simpang Ampat	5.2822°N 100.4750°E
Sekolah Rendah Islam As-salam	14120	Simpang Ampat	5.2841°N 100.5100°E
Sekolah Rendah Agama Al-amin	14310	Nibong Tebal	5.1456°N 100.4660°E
Sekolah Agama Rakyat Abu Bakar As-siddiq	14120	Simpang Ampat	5.2833°N 100.4960°E
Sekolah Rendah Agama Nur Al-amin	14320	Nibong Tebal	5.1279°N 100.4520°E
Sekolah Agama Rakyat An-nur	14200	Sungai Jawi	5.2213°N 100.4970°E
SMA Ibrah	13500	Permatang Pauh	5.4251°N 100.4230°E
Ma'had Tahfiz Nahdzatul Islah	14400	Bukit Mertajam	5.4008°N 100.4650°E
Madrasah Tahfizul Quran Penanti	14400	Bukit Mertajam	5.4130°N 100.4900°E
Darul Tahfiz Wal'ulum	14400	Bukit Mertajam	5.4131°N 100.4960°E
Sekolah Pendidikan Islam Al-abrar	14000	Bukit Mertajam	5.3359°N 100.4930°E
Sekolah Rendah Islam Tarbiah Ad-diniah	14000	Bukit Mertajam	5.3441°N 100.4960°E
Sekolah Pendidikan Islam Al-imtiyaz	14020	Bukit Mertajam	5.3132°N 100.5100°E
Madrasah Al Ittihadiah Al Wataniah	14000	Bukit Mertajam	5.3479°N 100.4870°E
Madrasah Nurul Islam	14400	Bukit Mertajam	5.4244°N 100.4650°E
Maahad Tahfiz Manabi'ul Ulum Penanti	14400	Bukit Mertajam	5.4075°N 100.4740°E
Sekolah Agama Nahdatul Islah	14400	Bukit Mertajam	5.4000°N 100.4640°E
Maahad Tarbiyah Banin Wal Banat	14400	Bukit Mertajam	5.4316°N 100.4660°E
Sekolah Agama Al-islahiyah	14000	Bukit Mertajam	5.4011°N 100.4960°E
Sekolah Rendah Islam Maahad At Tarbiah	14400	Bukit Mertajam	5.4314°N 100.4600°E
Sra (Kafa) Masjid Daerah Seberang Perai Tengah	14000	Bukit Mertajam	5.3702°N 100.4300°E
Madrasah Tahfiz Al-kayyis	13800	Sungai Dua	5.4538°N 100.4390°E
Pusat Tahfiz Al Irshad Sg Dua	13300	Bukit Mertajam	5.4639°N 100.4490°E
Madrasah Tahfiz Al-quran Raudhatul Ulum	13050	Butterworth	5.4946°N 100.3780°E
Madrasah Tahfiz Al-falah	13200	Kepala Batas	5.5391°N 100.4620°E
Madrasah Darul Atfal	13800	Sungai Dua	5.4746°N 100.4010°E
Madrasah Al-falah	13100	Penaga	5.4900°N 100.4000°E
Madrasah Tarbiah Islamiah	13800	Sungai Dua	5.4541°N 100.4370°E
Al Irshad Nurul Hidayah	13800	Sungai Dua	5.4503°N 100.4090°E
Sekolah Agama Rakyat Nurul Huda	13800	Sungai Dua	5.4726°N 100.4050°E
Madrasah Maahad Irsyad (R)	13310	Tasek Gelugor	5.4532°N 100.4740°E
Madrasah Al Tahzib Al Diniah	13200	Kepala Batas	5.4773°N 100.4390°E
Sekolah Agama Tuan Hj Abd Majid	13100	Penaga	5.5056°N 100.4080°E
Madrasah Al Saadah	13100	Penaga	5.5703°N 100.3490°E
Madrasah Nurul Huda	13100		5.5312°N 100.3790°E
Madrasah Saadiah Islamiyah	13200	Kepala Batas	5.4794°N 100.4470°E
Madrasah Al Saadah Al Watan	13200	Kepala Batas	5.4962°N 100.4430°E
Madrasatul Huda Diniah	13210	Kepala Batas	5.5520°N 100.5050°E
Madrasah Taswikul Ulumuddiniah	13200	Kepala Batas	5.5407°N 100.4400°E
Sar Nurul Hidayah Lahar Tabot	13100	Penaga	5.5163°N 100.3820°E
Sekolah Rendah Agama Rakyat Al-arifi	13200	Kepala Batas	5.5378°N 100.4450°E
Sekolah Agama Rakyat Abu Bakar	13300	Tasek Gelugor	5.4453°N 100.4600°E
Sekolah Rendah Islam Amal Rintis	13700	Seberang Jaya	5.3980°N 100.4090°E
Madrasah Tahfiz Darus Sa'adah	11900	Bayan Lepas	5.3055°N 100.2650°E
Maahad Tahfiz An Nahdhoh	14400	Bukit Mertajam	5.4042°N 100.4570°E

=== Special Education Private Schools ===
Name	Postcode	Area	Coordinates
Disabled Children Education School; Sekolah Pendidikan Kanak-kanak Cacat	11400	George Town	5.4057°N 100.2980°E
Mentally Retarded Children School; Sekolah Kanak-kanak Terencat Akal	10150	George Town	5.4138°N 100.3140°E
Sinar Harapan Daily Center; Pusat Harian Sinar Harapan	14000	Bukit Mertajam	5.3707°N 100.4450°E
Sinar Harapan Daily Center; Pusat Harian Sinar Harapan	13400	Butterworth	5.4232°N 100.3860°E
The Spastic Children's Association of Penang; Persatuan Kanak-kanak Spastik Pulau Pinang	11600	Jelutong	5.3893°N 100.3040°E

=== Other Private Schools ===
Name	Postcode	Area	Category	Coordinates
SM Arab Tahfiz	13220	Bukit Mertajam	Private Islamic Secondary School	5.4866°N 100.4830°E
SM Impian Bukit Mertajam	14000	Bukit Mertajam	Private Secondary School	5.3608°N 100.4660°E
