= Batu Lanchang =

- Neighbourhood
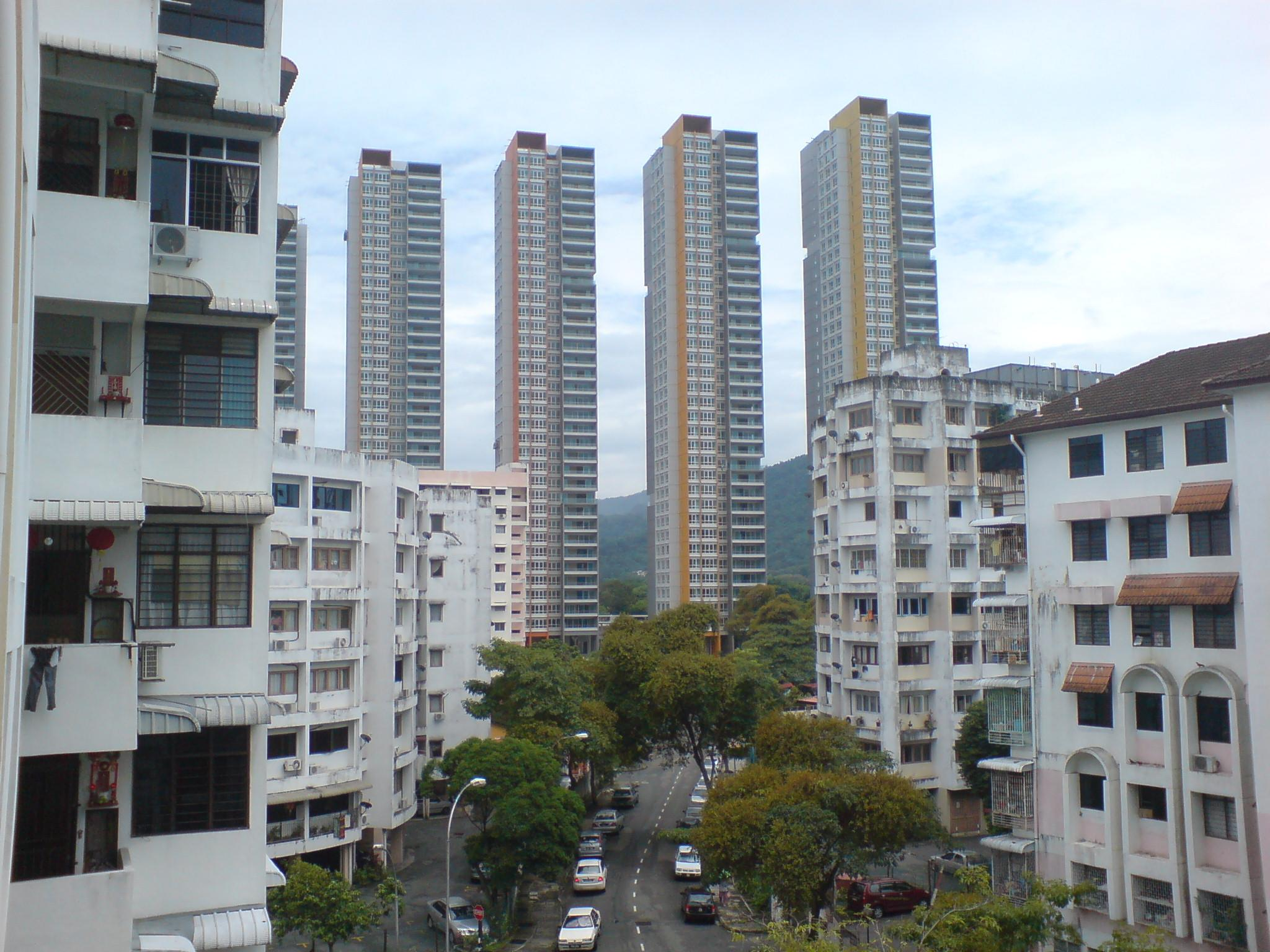
- Interactive map of Batu Lanchang
- Location within George Town in Penang
- Coordinates: 5°23′0″N 100°18′0″E
- Country: Malaysia
- State: Penang
- City: George Town
- District: Northeast
- Time zone: UTC+8 (MST)
  - Summer (DST): Not observed
- Postal code: 11600

Batu Lanchang is a residential neighbourhood within the downtown core of George Town in the Malaysian state of Penang. It is sandwiched between Farlim to the west and Jelutong to the east.

Formerly an agricultural area, Batu Lanchang has turned into a suburban residential area, with a mix of high-rises and landed properties. Green Lane, in particular, has become an affluent neighbourhood, whilst also serving as a major thoroughfare through Batu Lanchang, linking the city centre with Gelugor.

== History ==
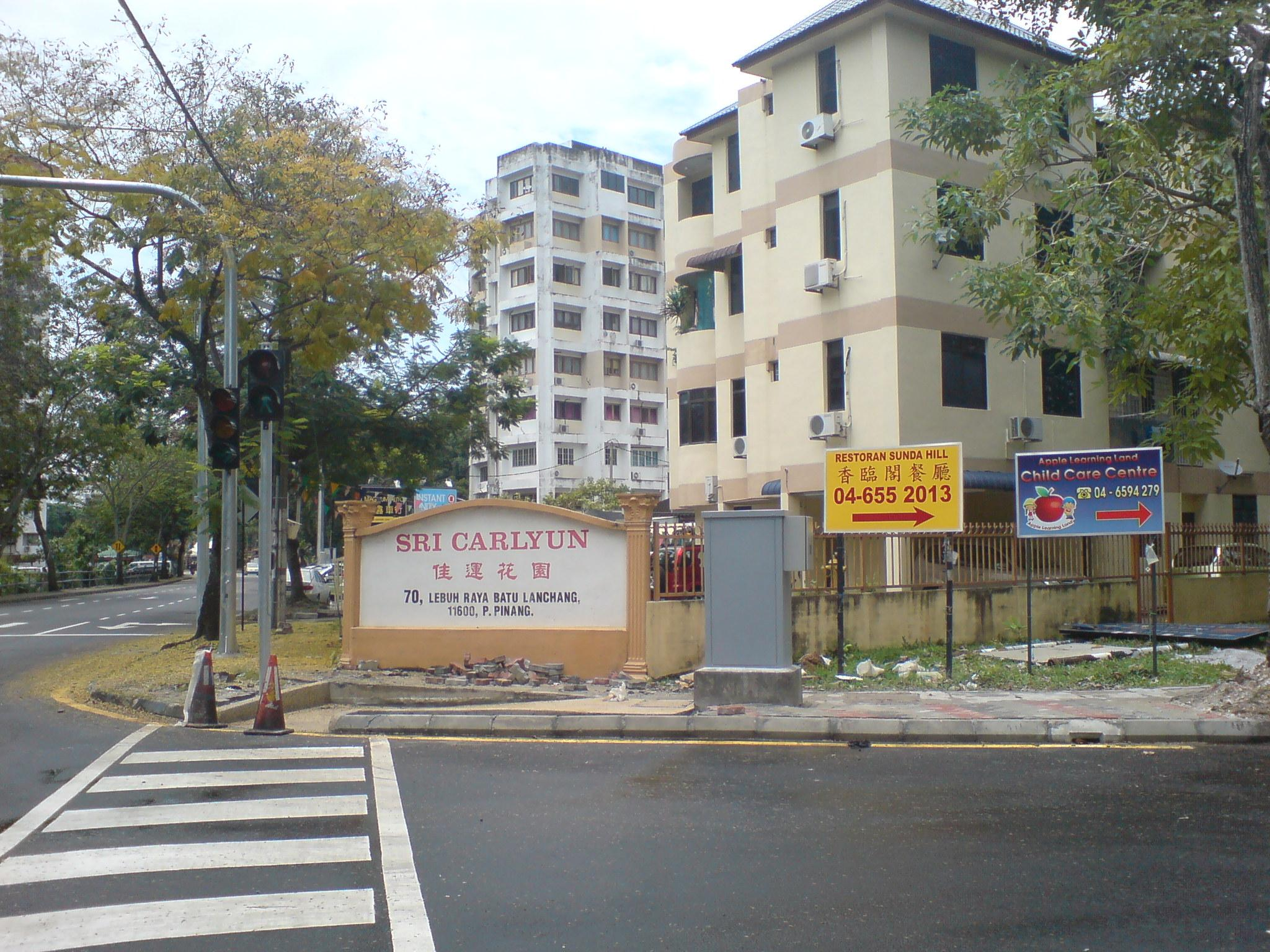
An apartment at Batu Lanchang Avenue

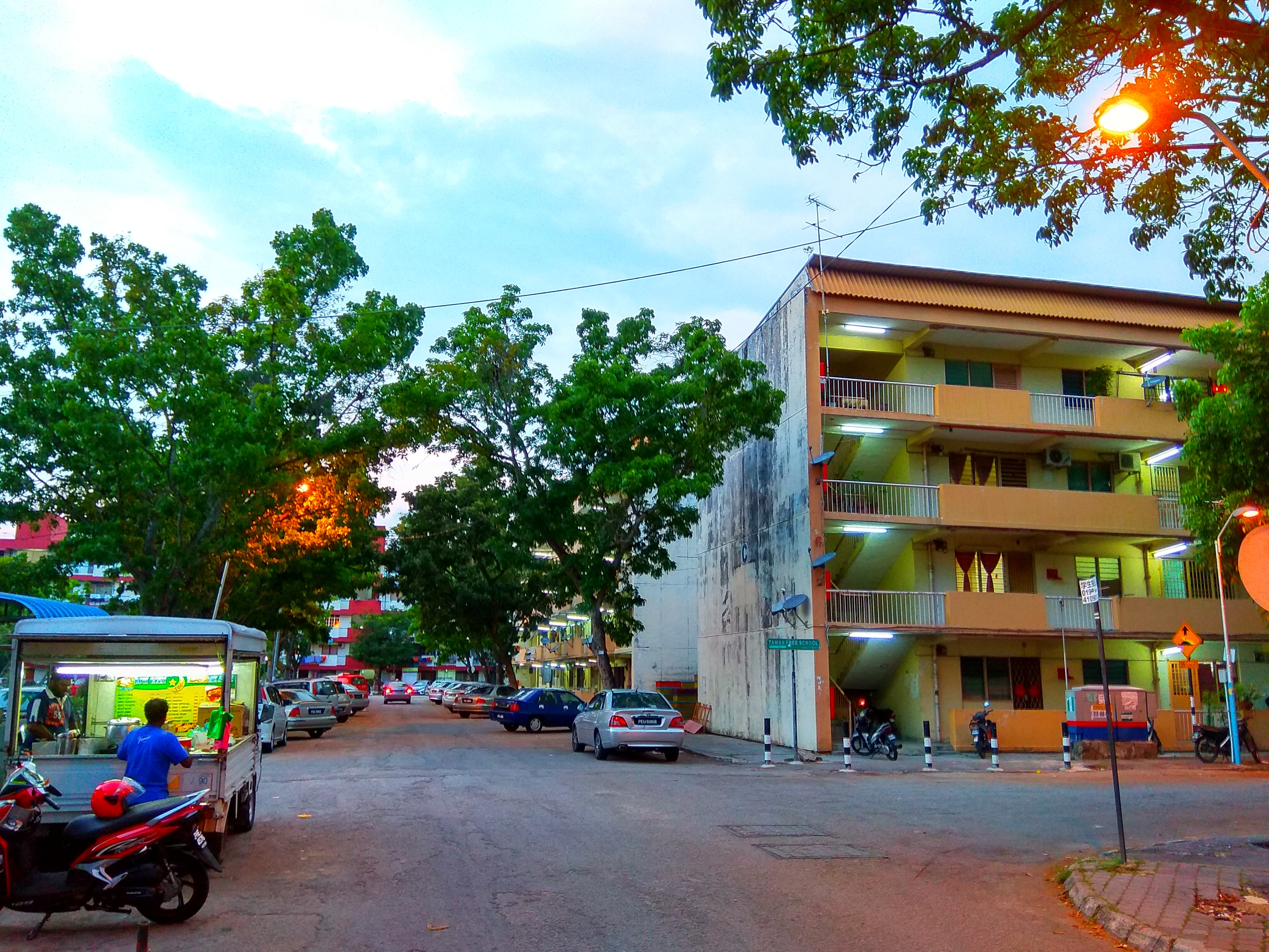
Taman Free School

Batu Lanchang was once an agricultural area, where coconut groves stretched all the way to the hills of Air Itam. At the time, Green Lane was the only road through Batu Lanchang; true to its name, it was a country path lined with trees. Urbanisation of the area began in the 1950s, when residential high rises were first built along Green Lane. The development of residential estates around Green Lane, such as Island Park and Island Glades, have transformed it into a wealthy suburban neighbourhood. Development then gradually spilled out across Batu Lanchang, leading to residential high rises like the Central Park condominiums.

== Transportation ==
To this day, Green Lane serves as the main thoroughfare within Batu Lanchang. It forms part of the Penang Middle Ring Road and is heavily used by motorists daily. Other major roads within this suburb include Jalan Tan Sri Teh Ewe Lim (formerly Batu Lanchang Road) and Batu Lanchang Lane; the former leads towards Jelutong while the latter links the suburb with Air Itam.

Rapid Penang buses 11, 13, 206 and 304 serve the residents of the suburb, by connecting Batu Lanchang with various destinations such as Jelutong, Gelugor, Air Itam and Paya Terubong.

== Education ==
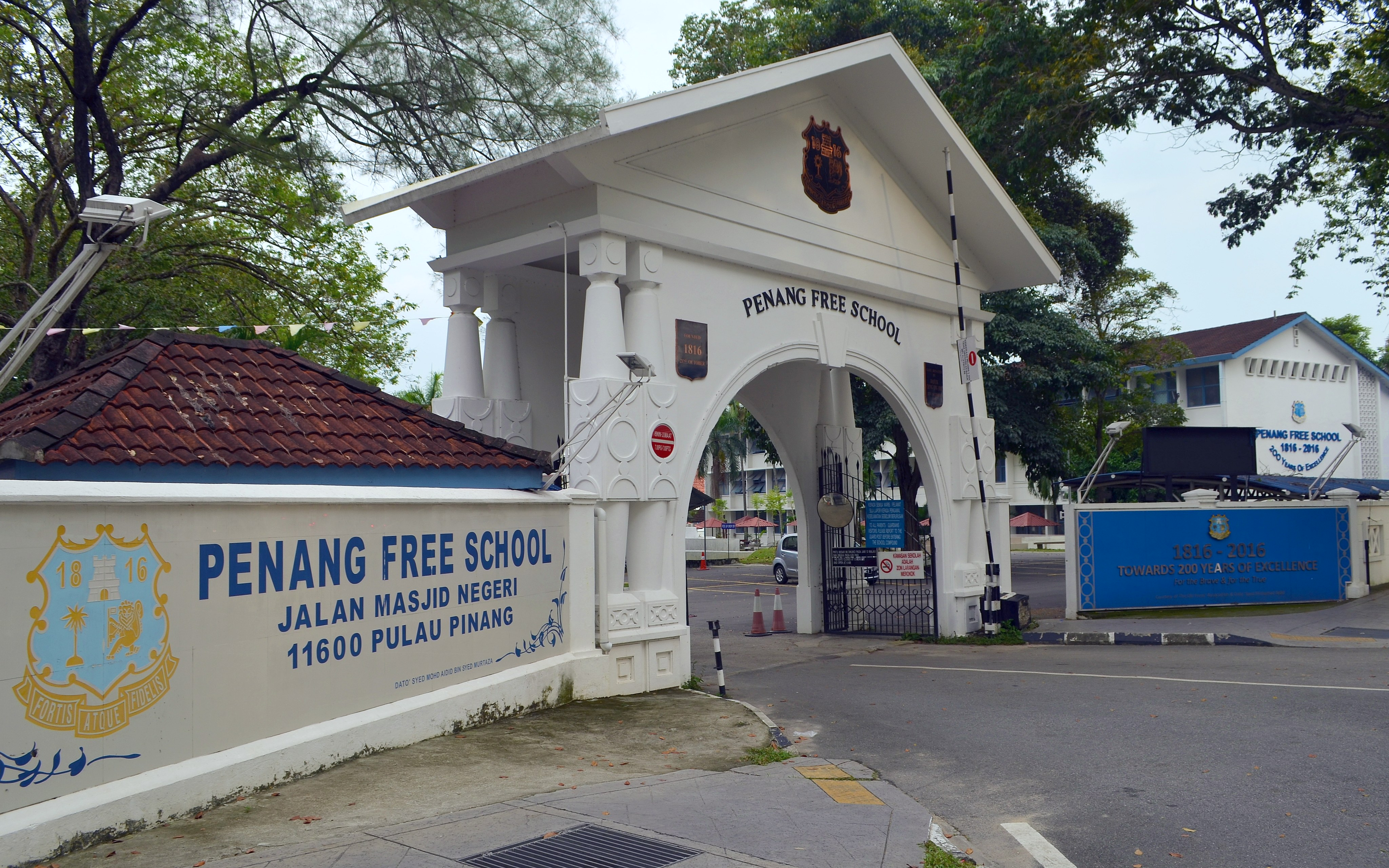
Penang Free School has produced several prominent personalities throughout its long history.

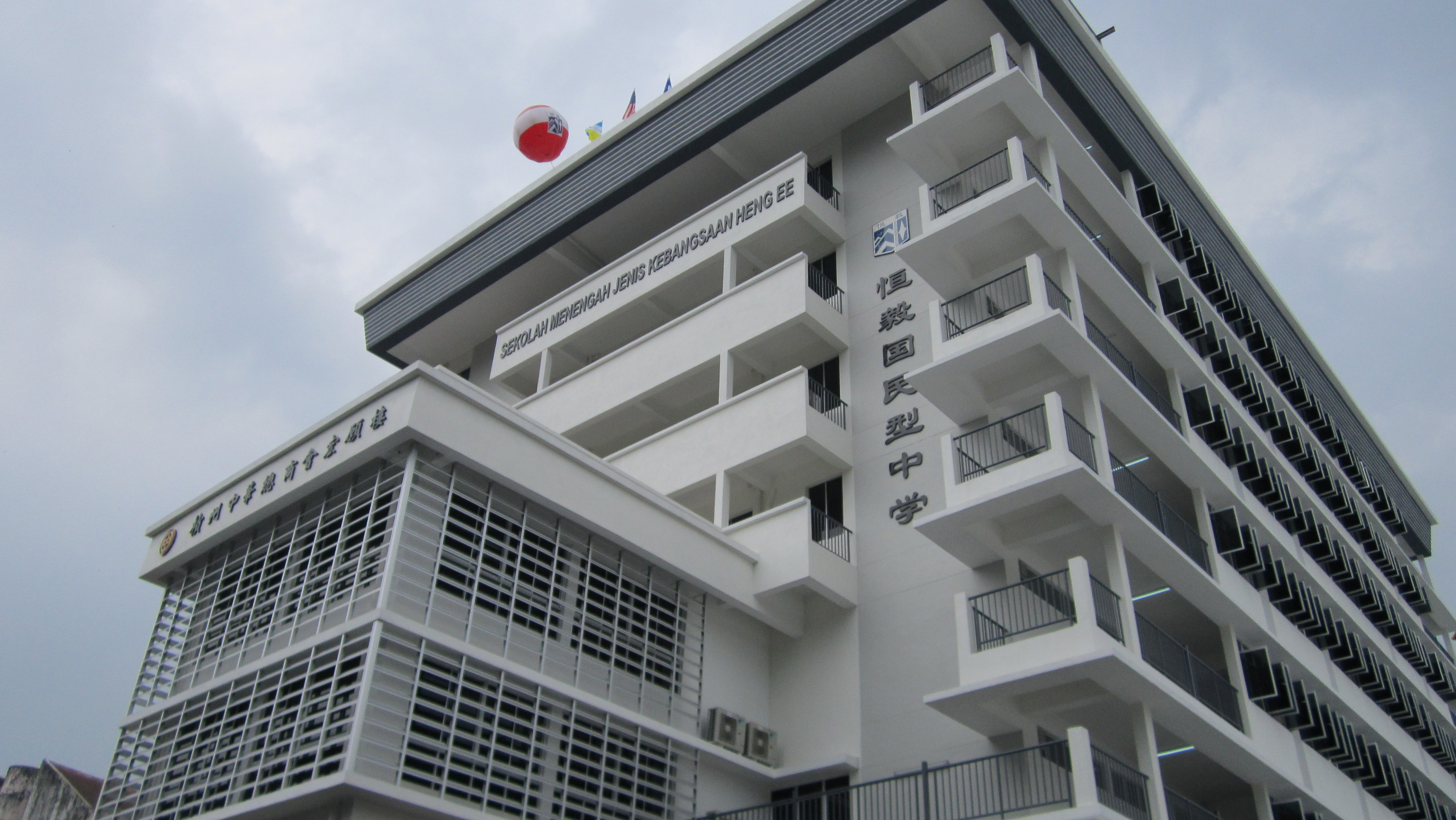
Heng Ee High School is well known for the strong academic performance of its students.

A total of two primary schools, seven Secondary schools and a vocational school are located within Batu Lanchang. Notably, Green Lane is home to two of Penang's top missionary schools – Penang Free School and Convent Green Lane. Penang Free School is also the oldest English school in Southeast Asia, with a history dating back to 1816.

Aside from Penang Free School and Convent Green Lane, Batu Lanchang contains two of the more well-known National-type Chinese high schools in Penang – Chung Hwa Confucian High School and Heng Ee High School. Chung Hwa Confucian High School was established in 1904, making it the oldest Chinese school in Penang.

The schools within Batu Lanchang are as follows.

Primary schools

- Batu Lanchang National Primary School
- Kheng Tean National Type Chinese Primary School

Secondary schools

- Penang Free School
- Convent Green Lane
- Chung Hwa Confucian High School
- Heng Ee High School
- Hamid Khan National Secondary School
- Georgetown National Secondary School
- Haji Zainul Abidin National Secondary School

Vocational school

- Batu Lanchang Vocational Secondary School

In addition to these schools, the Penang Digital Library is also located within the grounds of Penang Free School. Launched in 2016, it is the first digital library in Malaysia and contains a digitalised collection of over 3,000 reading materials.

Ethnic breakdown of Batu Lanchang's population in 2020
1. Chinese (85.5%)
2. Malay (8.70%)
3. Indian (5.30%)
4. Other ethnicities (0.50%)

== Health care ==
Lam Wah Ee Hospital, one of the several private hospitals on Penang Island, is located at the junction of Green Lane and Jalan Tan Sri Teh Ewe Lim. Since its establishment in 1883, the hospital continues to provide traditional Chinese health care to this day, whilst also offering modern treatments as with other private hospitals.

Two other private specialised medical centres within Batu Lanchang are the Carl Corrynton Medical Centre and the Optimax Eye Specialist Hospital.

== Tourist attractions ==
- Batu Lanchang Market, where a variety of Penang cuisine can be sampled.

== Neighbourhoods ==
- Green Lane
- Taman Free School
