= Tasek Gelugor (disambiguation) =

Tasek Gelugor or Tasek Glugor may refer to:

- Tasek Gelugor
- Tasek Gelugor (federal constituency), represented in the Dewan Rakyat
- Tasek Gelugor (state constituency), formerly represented in the Penang State Legislative Assembly (1959–86), see List of Malaysian State Assembly Representatives (1982–1986)
