= Taman Free School =

- Neighbourhood of George Town
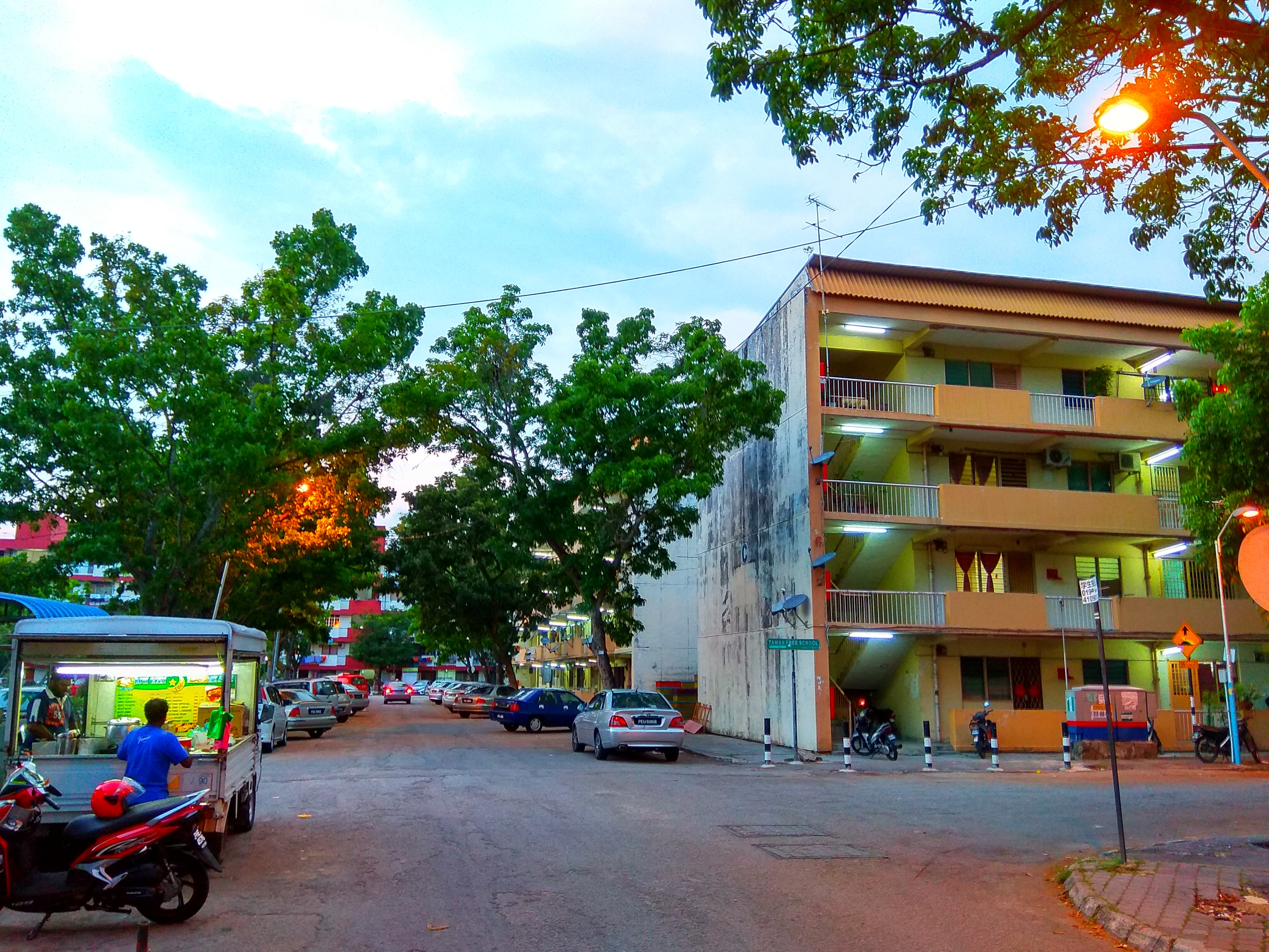

- Location within George Town in Penang
- Coordinates: 5°24′13.8954″N 100°18′34.9554″E
- Country: Malaysia
- State: Penang
- City: George Town
- District: Northeast
- Time zone: UTC+8 (MST)
  - Summer (DST): Not observed
- Postal code: 10460

Taman Free School is a residential neighbourhood within the downtown core of George Town in the Malaysian state of Penang. It is named after the nearby Penang Free School.

== History ==
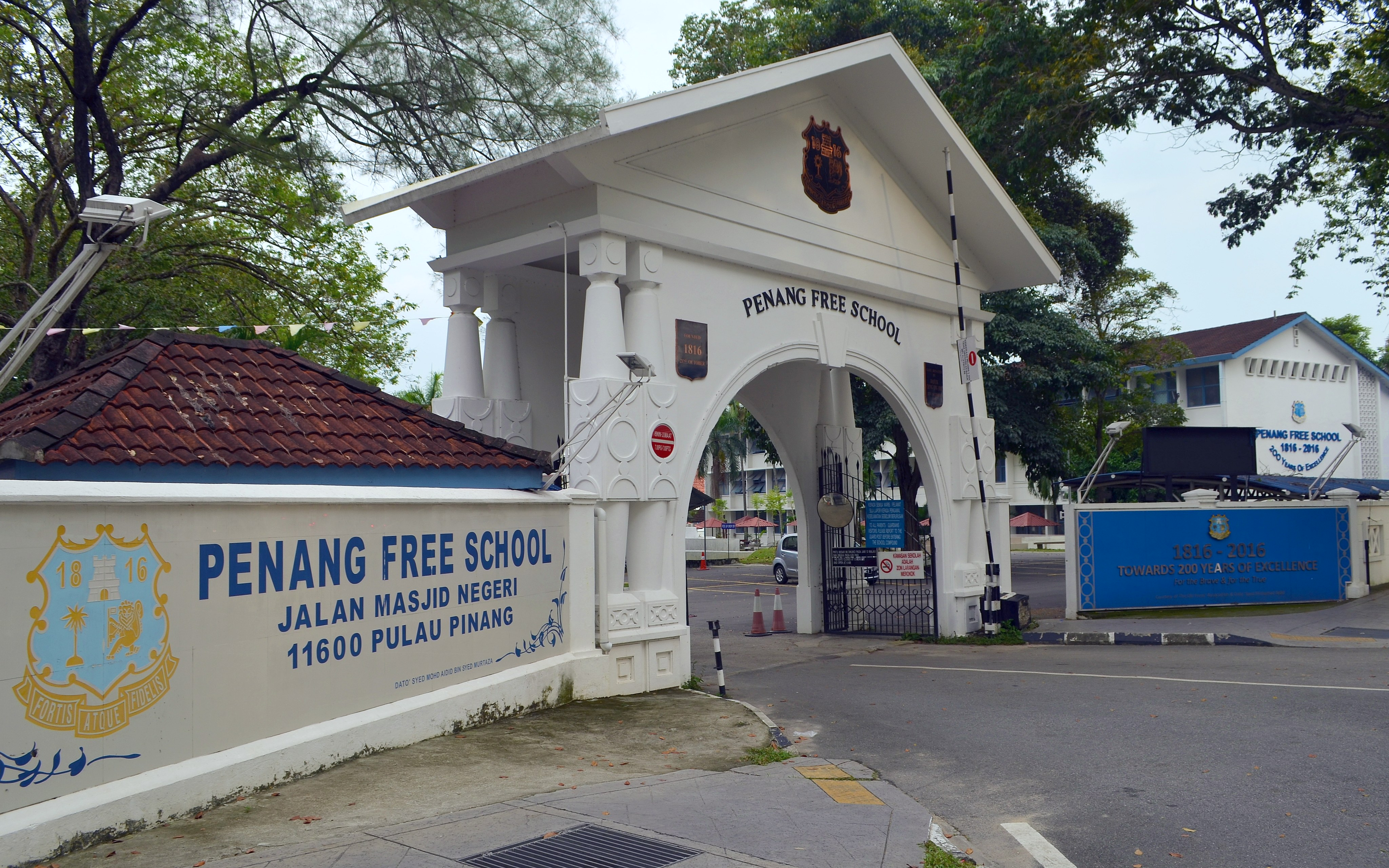
Penang Free School, Southeast Asia's oldest English school, is situated to the west of Taman Free School.

Taman Free School mainly consists of low- and medium-cost flats and apartments, which were built in the 1970s. Each of the walk-up apartments is five-stories high and was not equipped with lifts at the time of construction. In recent years, proposals have been made to rejuvenate the area, which entails the improvement of public facilities and the construction of newer apartments to lower maintenance costs.

== Transportation ==
Taman Free School is bounded by Jalan P. Ramlee to the north, Free School Road to the south and Jalan Trengganu to the west. The neighbourhood is served by Rapid Penang's bus route 206, which includes stops along the aforementioned roads, and links the neighbourhood with the city centre, Green Lane and Gelugor.

== Education ==
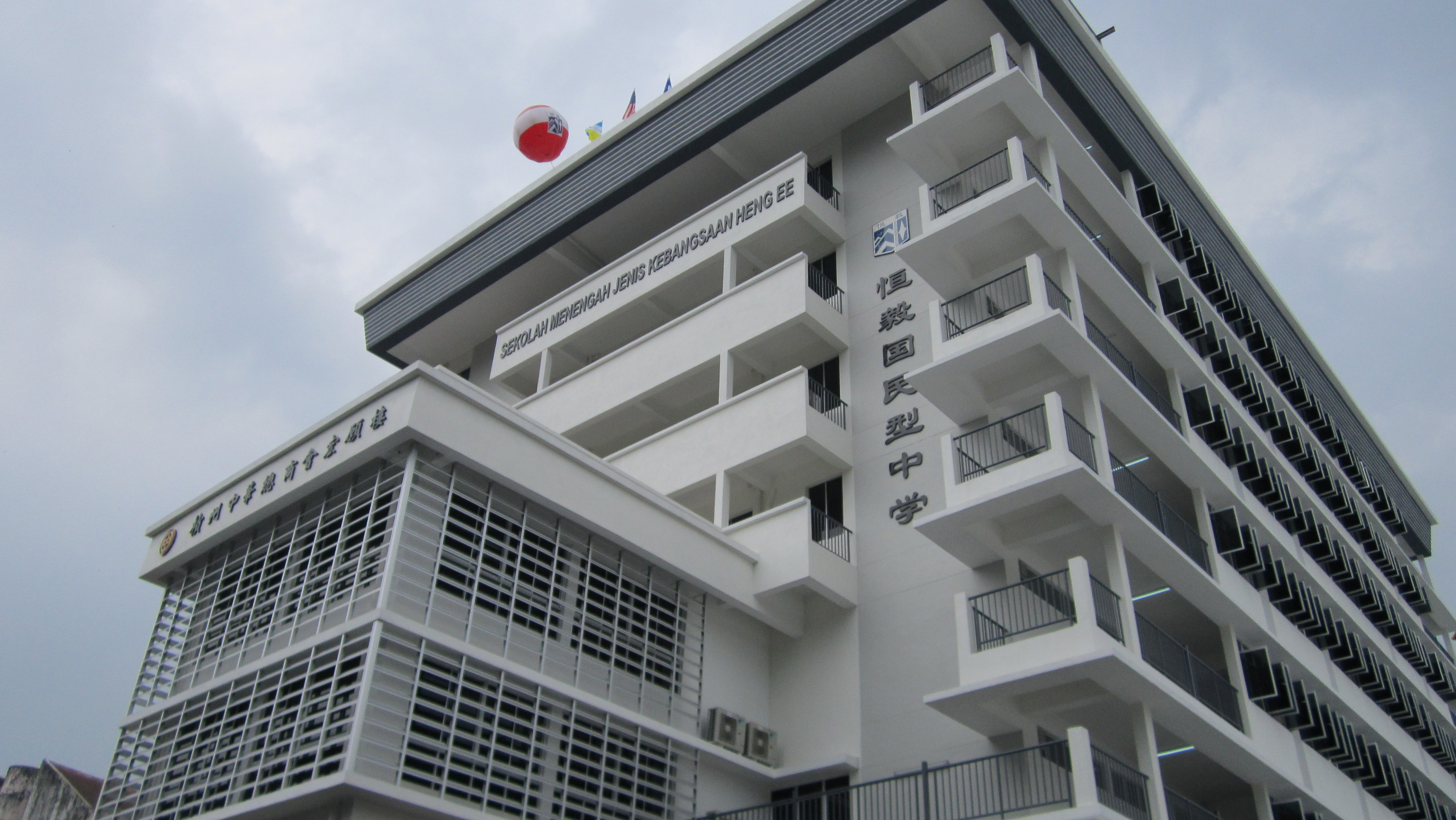
Heng Ee High School is situated across Free School Road.

The neighbourhood is served by two adjacent high schools, namely Penang Free School and Heng Ee High School.

== See also ==
- Batu Lanchang
- Green Lane
