= 1985 ABC Championship =

13th Asian basketball championship

1985 FIBA Asia Cup
13th Asian Basketball Championship

Tournament details
- Host country: Malaysia
- Dates: December 28 – January 5
- Teams: 15
- Venue(s): 3 (in 3 host cities)

Final positions
- Champions: Philippines (5th title)

Tournament statistics
- MVP: (Philippines) Allan Caidic

The 1985 Asian Basketball Confederation championship for men was held from December 28, 1985, to January 5, 1986, in Kuala Lumpur, Malaysia.

== Preliminary round ==
=== Group A ===
Pos	Team	Pld	W	L	PF	PA	PD	Pts	Qualification
1	China	2	2	0	257	103	+154	4	Advanced to the final round
2	Thailand	2	1	1	171	190	−19	3	Qualified to 5th–8th place playoffs
3	Indonesia	2	0	2	102	237	−135	2	Qualified to 9th–12th place playoffs

Source: FIBA Archive
Rules for classification: a) Points, b) Head-to-head record, c) Win–loss record, d) Quotient system

December 29

Indonesia	31–138	China
Scoring by half: 14–58, 17–80

Stadium Negara, Kuala Lumpur

December 30

Thailand	99–71	Indonesia
Scoring by half: 42–37, 57–34

Stadium Negara, Kuala Lumpur

December 31

China	119–72	Thailand
Scoring by half: 59–39, 60–33

Stadium Negara, Kuala Lumpur

=== Group B ===
Team	Pld	W	L	PF	PA	PD	Pts
Philippines	3	3	0	268	191	+77	6
Japan	3	2	1	244	236	+8	5
Jordan	3	1	2	253	228	+25	4
Pakistan	3	0	3	184	294	−110	3

December 29

Japan	91–69	Pakistan
Scoring by half: 43–36, 48–33

Indera Mulia Stadium, Ipoh

December 29

Philippines	81–70	Jordan
Scoring by half: 43–24, 38–46

Indera Mulia Stadium, Ipoh

December 30

Jordan	80–83	Japan
Scoring by half: 39–47, 41–36

Indera Mulia Stadium, Ipoh

December 30

Pakistan	51–100	Philippines
Scoring by half: 30–45, 21–55

Indera Mulia Stadium, Ipoh

December 31

Jordan	103–64	Pakistan
Scoring by half: 46–39, 57–25

Indera Mulia Stadium, Ipoh

December 31

Philippines	87–70	Japan
Scoring by half: 47–32, 40–38

Indera Mulia Stadium, Ipoh

=== Group C ===
Team	Pld	W	L	PF	PA	PD	Pts
South Korea	3	3	0	313	181	+132	6
Chinese Taipei	3	2	1	295	232	+63	5
Singapore	3	1	2	196	277	−81	4
Hong Kong	3	0	3	192	306	−114	3

December 29

Chinese Taipei	108–75	Hong Kong
Scoring by half: 51–48, 57–27

Han Chiang Indoor Stadium, Penang

December 29

South Korea	111–43	Singapore
Scoring by half: 55–29, 56–14

Han Chiang Indoor Stadium, Penang

December 30

South Korea	113–58	Hong Kong
Scoring by half: 50–30, 63–28

Han Chiang Indoor Stadium, Penang

December 30

Chinese Taipei	107–68	Singapore
Scoring by half: 60–18, 47–50

Han Chiang Indoor Stadium, Penang

December 31

Hong Kong	59–85	Singapore
Scoring by half: 31–34, 28–51

Han Chiang Indoor Stadium, Penang

December 31

Chinese Taipei	80–89	South Korea
Scoring by half: 41–43, 39–46

Han Chiang Indoor Stadium, Penang

=== Group D ===
Team	Pld	W	L	PF	PA	PD	Pts
Malaysia	3	3	0	319	188	+131	6
Iran	3	2	1	266	221	+45	5
India	3	1	2	286	239	+47	4
Sri Lanka	3	0	3	170	393	−223	3

December 28

Sri Lanka	53–140	Malaysia
Scoring by half: 21–67, 32–73

Stadium Negara, Kuala Lumpur

December 28

Iran	86–78	India
Scoring by half: 36–35, 50–43

Stadium Negara, Kuala Lumpur

December 29

Malaysia	92–58	Iran
Scoring by half: 50–20, 42–38

Stadium Negara, Kuala Lumpur

December 30

India	131–66	Sri Lanka
Scoring by half: 70–29, 60–37

Stadium Negara, Kuala Lumpur

December 31

Sri Lanka	51–122	Iran
Scoring by half: 29–43, 22–79

Stadium Negara, Kuala Lumpur

December 31

Malaysia	87–77	India
Scoring by half: 47–43, 40–34

Stadium Negara, Kuala Lumpur

== Final round ==
=== Classification 13th–15th ===
Team	Pld	W	L	PF	PA	PD	Pts
Hong Kong	2	2	0	185	156	+29	4
Pakistan	2	1	1	172	147	+25	3
Sri Lanka	2	0	2	121	175	−54	2

January 2

Pakistan	83–99	Hong Kong
Scoring by half: 31–52, 52–47

Stadium Negara, Kuala Lumpur

January 3

Sri Lanka	48–89	Pakistan
Scoring by half: 32–46, 16–43

Stadium Negara, Kuala Lumpur

January 5

Hong Kong	86–73	Sri Lanka
Scoring by half: 49–35, 37–38

Stadium Negara, Kuala Lumpur

=== Classification 9th–12th ===
Team	Pld	W	L	PF	PA	PD	Pts
Jordan	3	3	0	275	178	+97	6
India	3	2	1	299	220	+79	5
Indonesia	3	1	2	188	278	−90	4
Singapore	3	0	3	200	286	−86	3

January 2

Indonesia	61–113	India
Scoring by half: 41–52, 20–61

Stadium Negara, Kuala Lumpur

January 2

Jordan	93–58	Singapore
Scoring by half: 51–28, 42–30

Stadium Negara, Kuala Lumpur

January 3

Singapore	65–70	Indonesia
Scoring by half: 29–32, 36–38

Stadium Negara, Kuala Lumpur

January 3

India	63–82	Jordan
Scoring by half: 29–42, 34–40

Stadium Negara, Kuala Lumpur

January 5

Jordan	100–57	Indonesia
Scoring by half: 50–29, 50–28

Stadium Negara, Kuala Lumpur

January 5

Singapore	77–123	India
Scoring by half: 36–73, 41–50

Stadium Negara, Kuala Lumpur

=== Classification 5th–8th ===
Team	Pld	W	L	PF	PA	PD	Pts
Japan	3	3	0	225	189	+36	6
Chinese Taipei	3	2	1	269	219	+50	5
Thailand	3	1	2	211	247	−36	4
Iran	3	0	3	201	251	−50	3

January 2

Thailand	62–70	Japan
Scoring by half: 32–43, 30–27

Stadium Negara, Kuala Lumpur

January 2

Iran	69–97	Chinese Taipei
Scoring by half: 34–48, 35–49

Stadium Negara, Kuala Lumpur

January 3

Japan	76–55	Iran
Scoring by half: 33–23, 43–32

Stadium Negara, Kuala Lumpur

January 3

Chinese Taipei	100–71	Thailand
Scoring by half: 50–28, 50–43

Stadium Negara, Kuala Lumpur

January 5

Thailand	78–77	Iran
Scoring by half: 36–41, 42–36

Stadium Negara, Kuala Lumpur

January 5

Japan	79–72	Chinese Taipei
Scoring by half: 38–35, 41–37

Stadium Negara, Kuala Lumpur

=== Championship ===
Team	Pld	W	L	PF	PA	PD	Pts
Philippines	3	3	0	233	209	+24	6
South Korea	3	2	1	226	213	+13	5
China	3	1	2	224	214	+10	4
Malaysia	3	0	3	195	242	−47	3

January 2
19:30

China	87–58	Malaysia
Scoring by half: 41–27, 46–31

Stadium Negara, Kuala Lumpur

January 2
21:00

Philippines	76–72	South Korea
Scoring by half: 36–25, 40–47

Stadium Negara, Kuala Lumpur

January 3
19:30

South Korea	74–65	China
Scoring by half: 31–29, 43–36

Stadium Negara, Kuala Lumpur

January 3
21:00

Malaysia	65–75	Philippines
Scoring by half: 29–40, 36–35

Stadium Negara, Kuala Lumpur

January 5
19:30

South Korea	80–72	Malaysia
Scoring by half: 43–36, 37–36

Stadium Negara, Kuala Lumpur

January 5
21:00

China	72–82	Philippines
Scoring by half: 42–48, 30–34

Stadium Negara, Kuala Lumpur

== Final standings ==
Qualified for the 1986 FIBA World Championship

Rank	Team	Record
1st place, gold medalist(s)	Philippines	6–0
2nd place, silver medalist(s)	South Korea	5–1
3rd place, bronze medalist(s)	China	3–2
4	Malaysia	3–3
5	Japan	5–1
6	Chinese Taipei	4–2
7	Thailand	2–3
8	Iran	2–4
9	Jordan	4–2
10	India	3–3
11	Indonesia	1–4
12	Singapore	1–5
13	Hong Kong	2–3
14	Pakistan	1–4
15	Sri Lanka	0–5

== Awards ==
1985 Asian champions

Philippines
Fifth title

- Most Valuable Player: (Philippines) Allan Caidic
- All-Star Team:
  - (China) Zhang Bin
  - (China) Sun Fengwu
  - (Philippines) Avelino Lim
  - (South Korea) Lee Chung-hee
  - (Philippines) Allan Caidic
