= Sungai Jawi =

- Suburb of Seberang Perai and district capital
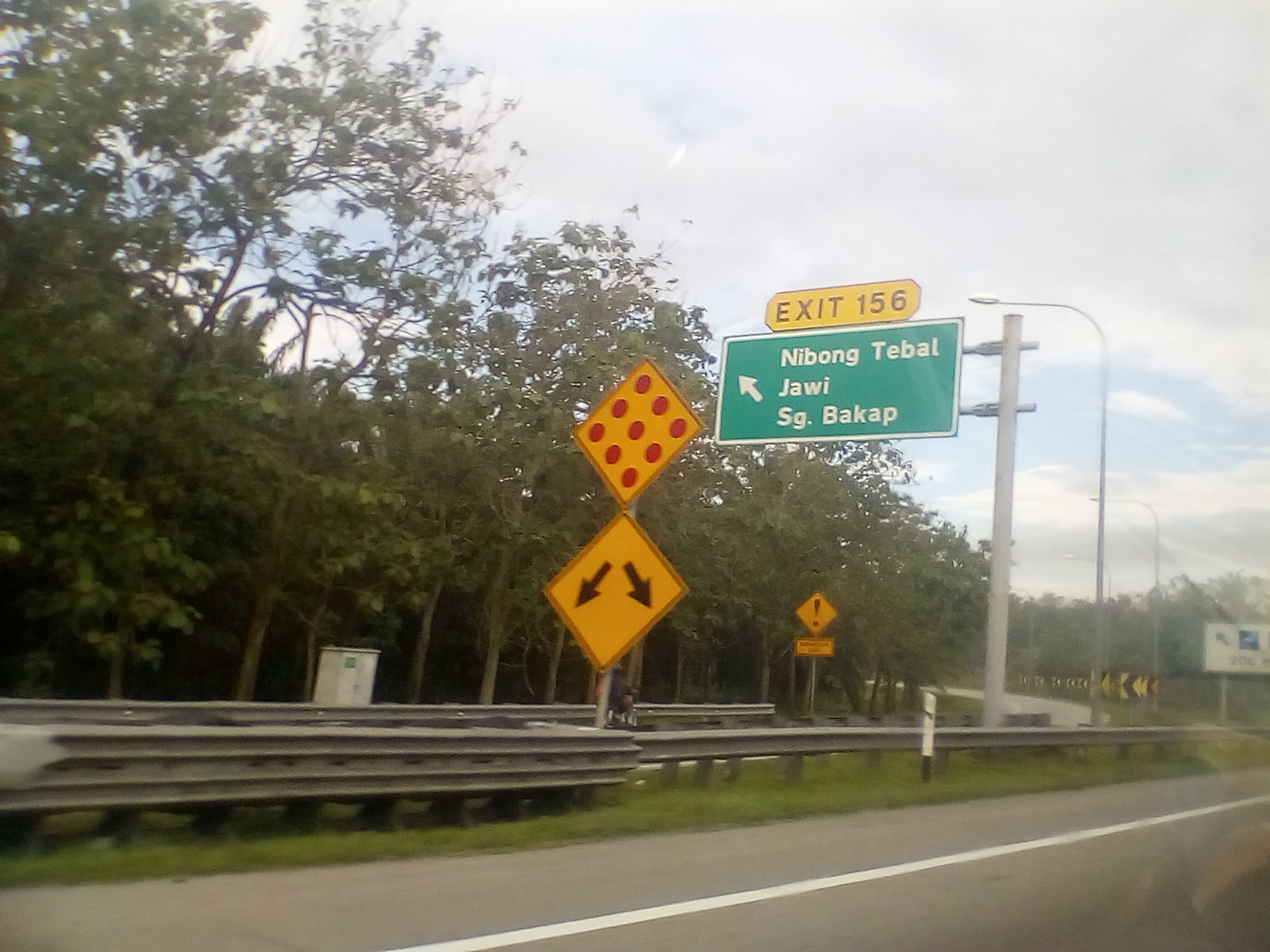
- Jawi Interchange

- Location within Seberang Perai in Penang
- Coordinates: 5°11′49″N 100°29′35″E
- Country: Malaysia
- State: Penang
- City: Seberang Perai
- District: South Seberang Perai

Area
  - Total: 45.9 km^{2} (17.7 sq mi)

Population (2020)
  - Total: 19,586
  - Density: 427/km^{2} (1,110/sq mi)

Demographics
  - Ethnic groups: 44.3% Chinese; 29.5% Bumiputera; 29.4% Malay; 0.1% indigenous groups from Sabah and Sarawak; 24.8% Indian; 0.3% Other ethnicities; 1.1% Non-citizens
- Time zone: UTC+8 (MST)
  - Summer (DST): Not observed
- Postal code: 142xx, 143xx

Sungai Jawi (Note: Commonly known as Jawi.) is a suburb of Seberang Perai in the Malaysian state of Penang. It also serves the seat of the Southern Seberang Perai District.

== Geography ==
Map of Sungai Jawi.
Click link at the top right corner to zoom in.
1 District Land Office
2 Jawi New Village

== Demographics ==
Ethnicities within Sungai Jawi in 2020
Ethnicities / Nationality	Percentage
Chinese	44.3%
Malays	29.4%
Other Bumiputeras	0.1%
Indians	24.8%
Others	0.3%
Non-Malaysians	1.1%

As of 2020, Mukim 11, the subdivision that contains Sungai Jawi, was home to a population of 19,586. Chinese formed 44% of the population, followed by Malays at 29% and Indians at nearly 25%.

== Transportation ==
North–South Expressway Northern Route, 156 serves Sungai Jawi.
