= Penang Chinese Girls' High School =

School in George Town, Penang, Malaysia

Penang Chinese Girls' National Type Chinese High School
- 槟华女子国民型华文中学; Sekolah Menengah Jenis Kebangsaan Perempuan Cina Pulau Pinang
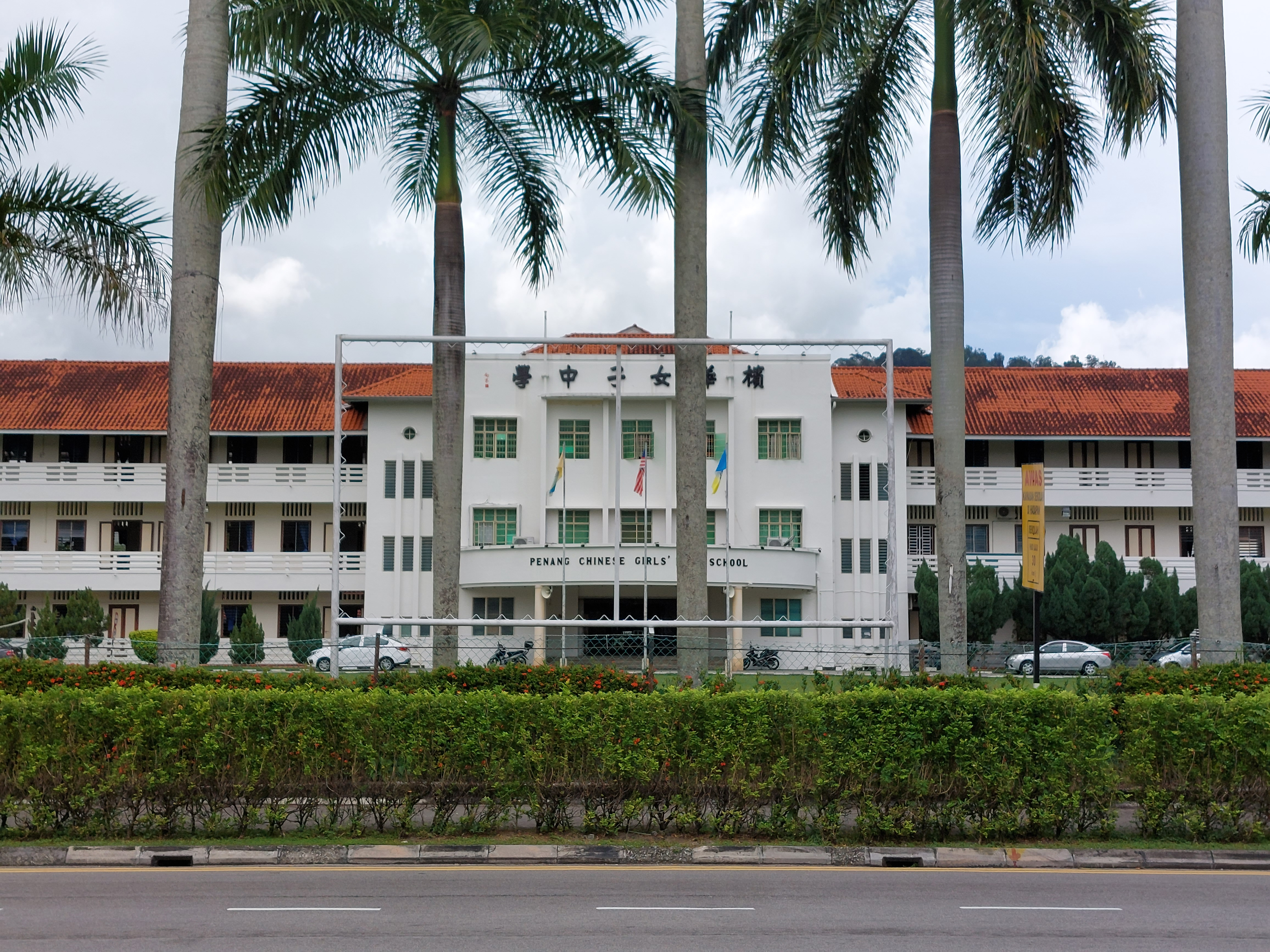
- Penang Chinese Girls' High School, September 2022.

Location
- 2 Jalan Gottlieb; George Town, Penang; Malaysia
- 5.4340572°N 100.3011078°E

Information
- Type: National-type Chinese secondary school All Girls school
- Motto: Decorum, Honesty, Diligence, Simplicity 庄诚勤朴
- Established: March 1919
- Headmistress: Ng Siew Eng 黄秀英
- Teaching staff: 120 (2023)
- Gender: Female
- Enrollment: 1286 (2023)
- Affiliations: Penang Chinese Girls' Private High School; Penang Chinese Girls' Primary School
- Website: http://www.smjk.edu.my/school/index.php?schid=17

Penang Chinese Girls' National Type Chinese High School
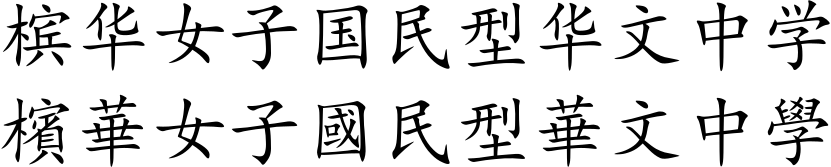
- Penang Chinese Girls' National Type Chinese High School in Simplified Chinese (top) and Traditional Chinese character (below)
- Traditional Chinese: 槟華女子國民型華文中學
- Simplified Chinese: 槟华女子国民型华文中学
Transcriptions
Standard Mandarin
- Hanyu Pinyin: Bīn Huá Nǚ Zǐ Guó Mín Xíng Huá Wén Zhōng Xué
Southern Min
- Hokkien POJ: Pin-hôa Kok-bîn-hêng Hôa-bûn Tiong-o̍h

Penang Chinese Girls' High School (PCGHS), officially the Penang Chinese Girls' National Type Chinese High School (simplified Chinese: 槟华女子国民型华文中学; traditional Chinese: 檳華女子國民型華文中學; Pe̍h-ōe-jī: Pin-hôa Kok-bîn-hêng Tiong-o̍h; Malay: Sekolah Menengah Jenis Kebangsaan Perempuan China Pulau Pinang) is a National-type Chinese secondary school in Penang, Malaysia. Often referred to as "Bin Hua" (Chinese: 檳華; pinyin: Bīn huá; Pe̍h-ōe-jī: Pin-hôa) among the local Chinese community in Penang, the school provides continuous education, ranging from pre-primary or kindergarten to pre-university studies.

== History ==
17 March 1919 Proposal by 4 prominent members of the Hokkien Community—Mr. Tan Sin Chen, Mr. Lim Lu Tek, Mr. Khor Sen Lee and Mr. Cheah Seng Tin, to establish a school for Chinese girls. This fact still stands as the number of non-Chinese among its enrolment and alumni is next to none. The proposal was unanimously approved and the Fukien Girls' School was established. Originally, the school was intended to be opened on 15 January 1920, but was delayed due to a number of problems among which were the lack of teachers and pupils.

8 March 1920 Official opening of Fukien Girls' High School at Macalister Road.

11 March 1951 Fukien Girls' School was renamed as the Penang Chinese Girls' High School and the primary school was renamed as the Penang Chinese Girls' Primary School.

January 1956 The students attend their classes at the new school building at 2, Gottlieb Road

1962 The school accepted full government aid. As a consequence, the school was divided into 2 sections—a national-type school and an independent high school (for overaged pupils).

1963 A kindergarten was opened. Thus, the school now provides continuous education from kindergarten to school certificate. (UPSR for primary level, SPM for secondary level and STPM for pre-university level)
