= Federal Special Education National Schools =

Federal Special Education National Primary and Secondary Schools
- Sekolah Rendah dan Menengah Kebangsaan Pendidikan Khas Persekutuan

Location
- 600H, Jalan Lembah Permai, 11200 Tanjung Bungah; George Town, Penang; Malaysia

Information
- Type: Government-Aided Boarding School
- Established: 1954
- Principal: Mrs. Mui Siew Koon
- Grades: Primary: Year 1 - Year 6 Secondary: Form 1 - Form 5
- Abbreviation: FSD
- Phone no.: 04-8907313 / 8905115

The Federal Special Education National Schools (Malay: Sekolah-sekolah Kebangsaan Pendidikan Khas Persekutuan), comprising the Primary and Secondary Schools (Sekolah Rendah dan Menengah) and formerly known as the Federation School for the Deaf, is a group of government-aided boarding schools in Penang, Malaysia. Currently located at 600H, Vale of Tempe Road, 11200 Tanjung Bungah, it was the pioneer deaf school in Malaysia.

The Federation School has a very important place in Malaysia's Deaf community as the first boarding school for deaf children in Malaya (the Chinese Deaf School in Singapore was founded in the same year).

== History of the establishment ==
In 1952, Dr C Elaine Field, a medical specialist, visited Penang to treat deaf children. Having met and interviewed some of the deaf children about their welfare, Dr Field realised that there were no education programmes for deaf children in Malaya. Dr Field met with Lady Templer, the wife of Sir Gerald Templer, British High Commissioner in Malaya, during an official visit to Penang.

On 9 December 1952, Lady Templer chaired a special meeting at the Residency (official residence of the Resident Commissioner of Penang), which agreed to channel funds for the establishment of a school for the deaf. In 1954, the Federation School for the Deaf officially opened its doors at No. 47, Northam Road, George Town, Penang. It was the first school for the deaf in Malaya, and offered primary education to deaf students. R.P. Bingham, the Resident Commissioner of Penang, supported the establishment and became the first Chairman of the Board of Governors.

== The school 1954-1961 ==
Miss J. M. Hickes was appointed as the first principal of the school. At the beginning, the school housed only seven students and two teachers. The entry age was not fixed, with some students entering at 3 or 4 and others at 9. By 1959, the number of students had increased to 60 students. Students who completed Standard 6 did not continue their education, but were given the opportunity to gain vocational skills such as sewing, woodworking and repairing. At that time, the school was not funded by the Government, but was organised by volunteers and non-government organisations.

== Towards secondary education (1961 - 1970) ==
In 1961, Miss J.M. Hicks resigned as principal and was succeeded by Miss Lee Kooi Jong, originally a nurse at the Penang General Hospital, who had previously served as the first Secretary to the Board of Governors and as a teacher at the school. Lee persuaded businessmen and entrepreneurs in Penang to give opportunities to the deaf children to gain work experience at their companies. FSD students who completed Standard 6 received offers to work at companies doing printing, sewing, and other trades.

Lee (known as Dato' Hajah Saleena Yahaya Isa after her conversion to Islam) also increased the length of courses from 6 years to 10 years. Years 8, 9 and 10 received on-the-job vocational training after school. The first students to sit for the Lower Certificate of Education (L.C.E.) were registered 1969, with a 100% pass rate. Secondary education was finally offered at FSD from 1970.

Due to the growth of the school, the site at Northam Road was deemed to be inadequate, and the Board of Governors, decided to relocated the school to a new site. At the end of 1963, a 12-hectare site at Vale of Tempe Road (Jalan Lembah Permai) in Tanjong Bungah was bought at 65 cents per square foot, with Mr (later Tan Sri) Loh Boon Siew, the director of the company that sold the land, sponsoring 15 cents per square foot. The Ministry of Rural Development of Malaysia contributed $500,000 for the construction of school buildings. The school at Northam Road was sold at the price $340,000 to fund the new school at Tanjung Bungah.

Pursuant to the agreement between the school and the buyer, the school would remain at the old premises for two years until the new school was scheduled to open in 1965. Unfortunately, the school was not completed within the two years. The Board of Governors suggested that the school close down until the problem was solved, but the principal, Mrs Saleena objected to the disruption to the children's education, and turned to the State Education Department, through the Inspector of Chinese Schools, for help. As a result, Shih Chung Primary School was chosen to accommodate the FSD students during the afternoon session. The problem of hostelling was solved by placing the boys at the Charity Home next to Eastern & Oriental Hotel, while the girls were placed at Poh Leung Kok (now Cheshire Home). The school's office was placed at the Trustees Office at the High Court. Six months later, the school was reunited in a building at Poh Leung Kok, after the authorities of Poh Leung Kok allowed the school to use the whole of its premises.

== FSD as a government aided school ==
The school was finally reopened in 1970, the opening ceremony was attended by the first Malaysians Prime Minister, Tunku Abdul Rahman. At the same time, the school became the first deaf school to receive government-aided status.

== From Oral Communication to Total Communication ==
Initially, Form 4 and 5 students were attached to normal schools such as Jelutong National Secondary School and Tanjung Bungah National Secondary School in Penang. However, the deaf students found it difficult to cope with the teaching at those schools, and the FSD subsequently expanded to teach at the higher secondary level.

Eleanor Culas who was the first FSD student to study at Gallaudet University, which is a deaf university in Washington D.C., United States. She was impressed with American Sign Language used by the Deaf community in the United States. She was convinced that American Sign Language would be useful in Malaysia. Culas was not satisfied with the current system used in Malaysia, where a Manchester-based Oral method was adopted. Therefore, Eleanor asked Frances M. Parsons, a Gallaudet lecturer, deaf herself with a strong preference for Signed English, to stop-by in Malaysia and share her expertise in Deaf Education with the FSD teachers.

In 1976, Frances Parsons visited FSD, and persuaded Saleena and other teachers that the Total Communication system would help to increase the understanding and mastery of American Sign Language. In order to prove the effectiveness of the system, Parsons started a Total Communication class and demonstrated the "Manual Sign" method using Signed English with signs borrowed from American Sign Language to FSD teachers for one month. Meanwhile, Saleena arranged a meeting between Parsons with Dr Mahathir Mohamad, the Minister of Education, where Parsons explained the effectiveness of the system was comparable to learning by hearing. The Ministry of Education approved a pilot class that used only Total Communication, and FSD was chosen to experiment with this method. The class was given 5 years to test its effectiveness. However, after 3 years of probation, the Total Communication class was proved far better than the Oral communication class.

As of 1998, the students continue to use an English language based variety of sign language.

== List of FSD principals ==
(1954–1961) Miss J.M. Hicks (Mrs. J.M. Sundram)

(1961–1987) Mrs. Saleena Yahaya Isa (Miss Lee Kooi Jong)

(1987–1990) Mr. Francis Chai Voon Oon

(1990–1995) Mrs. Chan Sew Lian

(1995–1996) Mdm. Yeoh Suan Choo (née Mrs Khong)

(1997–present) Mrs. Mui Siew Koon
