= Penang Chinese Girls' Private High School =

- 槟华女子独立中学; Sekolah Menengah Persendirian Perempuan Cina Pulau Pinang

Location
- 2 Jalan Gottlieb; Georgetown, Penang 10350; Malaysia

Information
- Type: All-Girls Private High School
- Motto: 庄诚勤朴 (Decorum, Honesty, Diligence, Simplicity)
- Established: March 8, 1919
- Headmistress: Leow Ghin Ngee
- Gender: Girls
- Enrollment: Approx. 300
- Nickname: PCGPHS
- Affiliations: Penang Chinese Girls' High School; Penang Chinese Girls' Primary School
- Website: http://binhua.edu.my/

Penang Chinese Girls' Private High School (PCGPHS) is a private high school in Penang, Malaysia. It is one of the Chinese independent high schools in the country. The school offers a 6-year program that allows students to take either the internationally recognized Unified Examination Certificate (UEC) or the Malaysian government examinations, PMR (Penilaian Menengah Rendah) and SPM (Sijil Pelajaran Malaysia).

== History ==
Penang Chinese Girls' High School was initially established as Penang Fukian Girls' High School by Hokkien immigrants from China in 1919. By 1920, the school had 52 students. Due to the increasing number of students, the school relocated several times and was forced to close temporarily in 1941 due to the outbreak of World War II. It resumed operations in 1945 and was renamed Penang Chinese Girls' High School in 1951. In 1962, the school transitioned to a publicly funded system under the name Penang Chinese Girls' High School, while the private Chinese-based school continued under the name Penang Chinese Girls' Private High School. The school used to accept boys, but it now exclusively enrolls girls.

== Historical Timeline ==
- 1919: Penang Fukian Girls' High School was founded by Hokkien immigrants, located at 29, Dato Keramat Road (the site of the former Sam Kiang Association). The school officially opened the following year with 52 students.
- 1923: Due to the growing number of students, the Board of Directors purchased a property at 145, Acheen Street for the school premises.
- 1927: A four-year teacher training course was introduced, and a two-story building with four classrooms was constructed.
- 1931: The first branch was opened at 82, Muntri Street. The following year, it moved to 93, Hutton Lane, then to 65, Macalister Road, and a second branch was established at 37, Kelawei Road.
- 1939: The school relocated to 204, Burmah Road, with nearly a thousand students enrolled.
- 1941: The outbreak of World War II halted the school's development plans, and the school ceased operations.
- 1945: The school resumed operations and offered a fast-track teacher training program, later converted to a regular high school.
- 1947: The Board of Directors purchased land at Gottlieb Road for the construction of a new school building.
- 1951: To eliminate regional biases, the school was renamed Penang Chinese Girls' High School.
- 1955: The three-story school building at the current site was completed, and the secondary school students moved in the following year.
- 1962: Penang Chinese Girls' High School transitioned to a publicly funded system and was renamed Penang Chinese Girls' High School, while the private school continued as Penang Chinese Girls' Private High School, primarily catering to overage students.
- 1965: The government implemented the automatic promotion system from primary six to secondary school, cutting off the source of new junior high school students.
- 1968: The school offered senior high school courses in commerce and science, primarily enrolling students who had failed government exams.
- 1967: The second three-story building for the school was completed, primarily for the private high school, but due to limited enrollment, only the top floor was used by the private school.
- 1989: The sharp decline in new student enrollments left the school with only 18 students, almost leading to its closure.
- 1990: With the assistance of the Penang Independent School Revival Committee, the school successfully reintroduced the first-year junior high class.
- 1991: A revival committee for Penang Chinese Girls' Private High School was formed by a group of professors and doctors from Universiti Sains Malaysia (USM).
- 1992: The Penang Chinese Girls' Private High School Parent-Teacher Association was established.
- 1997: The number of students continued to grow, including international students. The original three-story building could no longer accommodate the demand, and the Board of Directors funded the construction of a new five-story building.
- 1998: The Indonesian turmoil led to an influx of Chinese students, doubling the school's enrollment. The new five-story building was completed, with seven classrooms and a ground-floor activity hall used by the private school. The senior high school science class was reintroduced.
