= Tasek Gelugor =

- Suburb of Seberang Perai
- Location within Seberang Perai in Penang
- Coordinates: 5°29′0″N 100°30′0″E
- Country: Malaysia
- State: Penang
- City: Seberang Perai
- District: North Seberang Perai

Area
  - Total: 38 km^{2} (15 sq mi)

Population (2020)
  - Total: 31,160
  - Density: 820/km^{2} (2,100/sq mi)

Demographics
  - Ethnic groups: 78.1% Bumiputera; 77.8% Malay; 0.3% indigenous groups from Sabah and Sarawak; 12.6% Chinese; 4.6% Indian; 0.2% Other ethnicities; 4.5% Non-citizens
- Time zone: UTC+8 (MST)
  - Summer (DST): Not observed
- Postal code: 13300

Tasek Gelugor is a suburb of Seberang Perai in the Malaysian state of Penang. Within its vicinity it is the town closest to the North–South Expressway. The expressway sign for the Ipoh-George Town link can be seen in this town.

There are also roads connecting to Padang Serai, Penang Matriculation College, Penaga, Lunas, Kepala Batas[Bertam] and Bukit Mertajam.

There is a river near here named Sungai Jarak. Tasek Gelugor is near to Kedah border which is close to Kampung Selamat in Penang and Padang Serai in Kedah.

The Tasek Gelugor railway station serves residents here and in Padang Serai to travel to Bukit Mertajam and Sungai Petani.

== Geography ==
Map of Tasek Gelugor.
Click link at the top right corner to zoom in.
1 Tasek Gelugor Market
2 Tasek Gelugor railway station
3 Scientex Sungai Dua
4 Kampung Selamat
5 Kubang Menerong
6 Permatang Manggis
7 Pokok Tampang
8 Taman Desa Sena

== Demographics ==
Ethnicities within Tasek Gelugor in 2020
Ethnicities / Nationality	Percentage
Malays	77.8%
Other Bumiputeras	0.3%
Chinese	12.6%
Indians	4.6%
Others	0.2%
Non-Malaysians	4.5%

As of 2020, Mukim 12, the subdivision that contains Tasek Gelugor, was home to a population of 31,160. Malays formed almost 78% of the population, followed by Chinese at 12%.

== Notable people ==
- Mohamad Sabu, former Minister of Defence
