= Hamid Khan National Secondary School, Penang =

School in Georgetown, Penang, Malaysia

Hamid Khan National Secondary School
- Sekolah Menengah Kebangsaan Hamid Khan
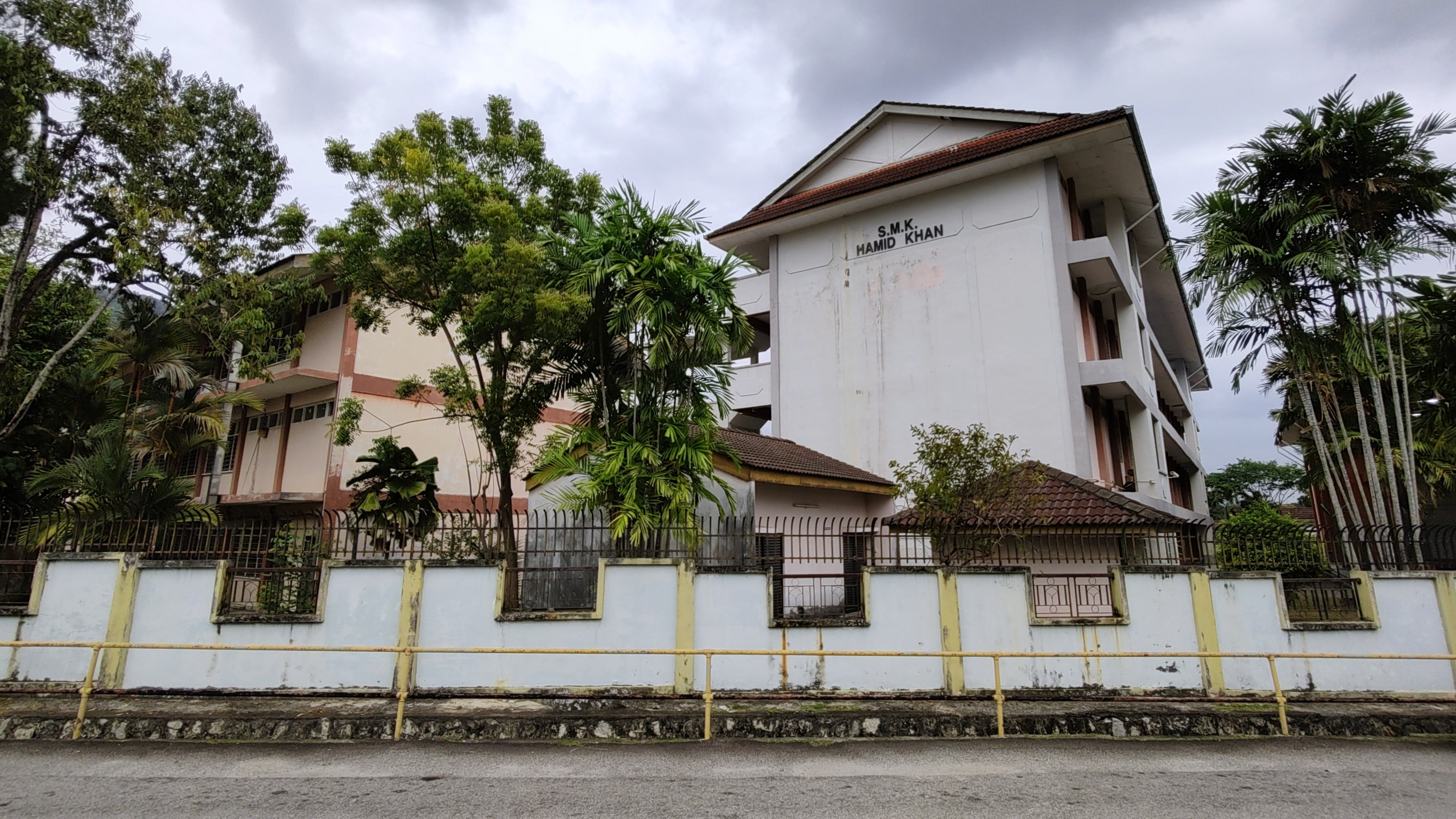
- SMK Hamid Khan school block

Location
- Island Glades, Jelutong, Georgetown, Penang; Malaysia; 5.38135°N 100.30303°E

Information
- Type: Public coeducational secondary
- Motto: Hidup Sambil Belajar (Study As You Live)
- Established: 1977
- Grades: Form 1- Form 5
- Enrollment: approx. 800
- Website: smkhk.hosting2006.com
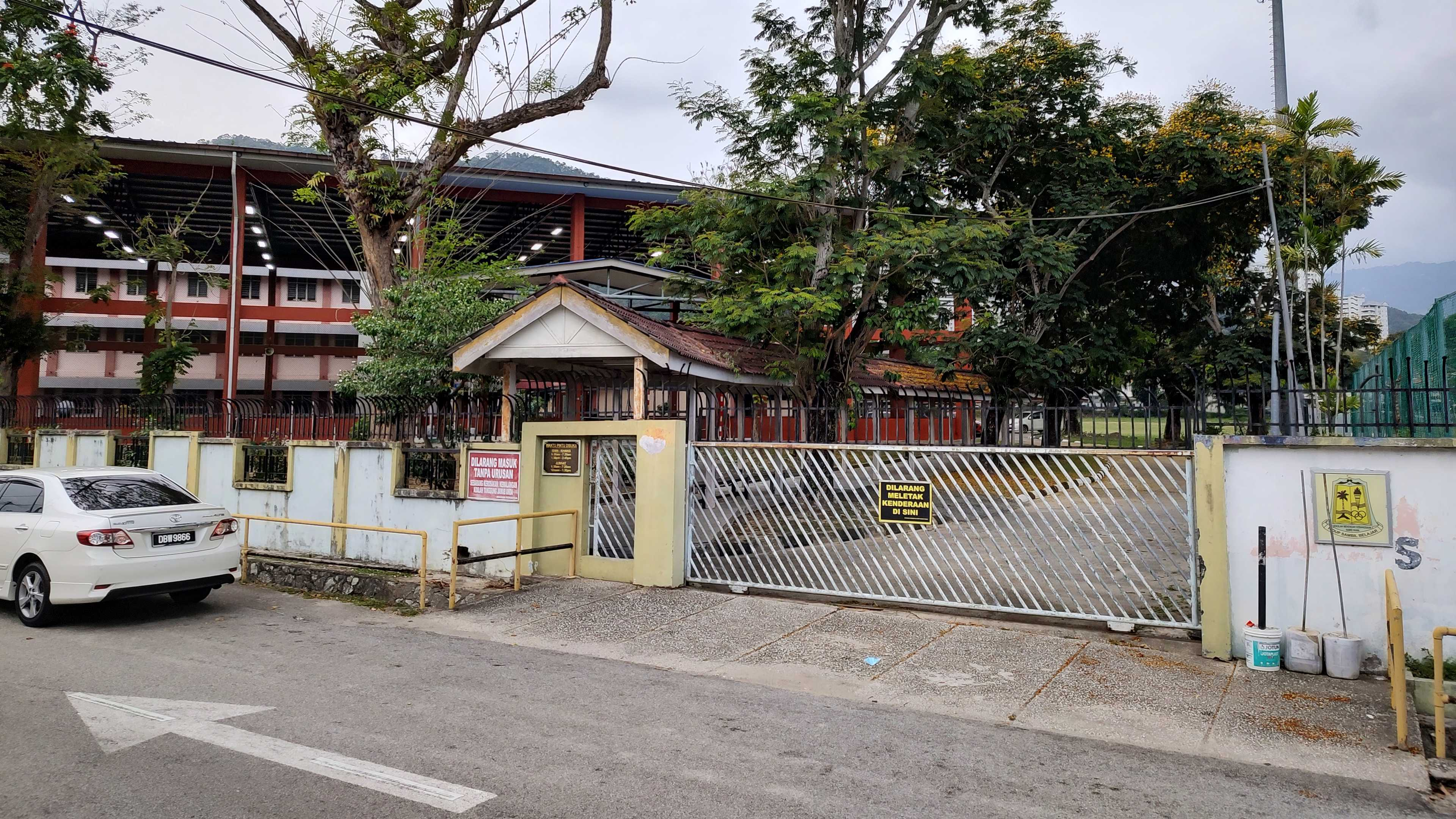
- SMK Hamid Khan school gate

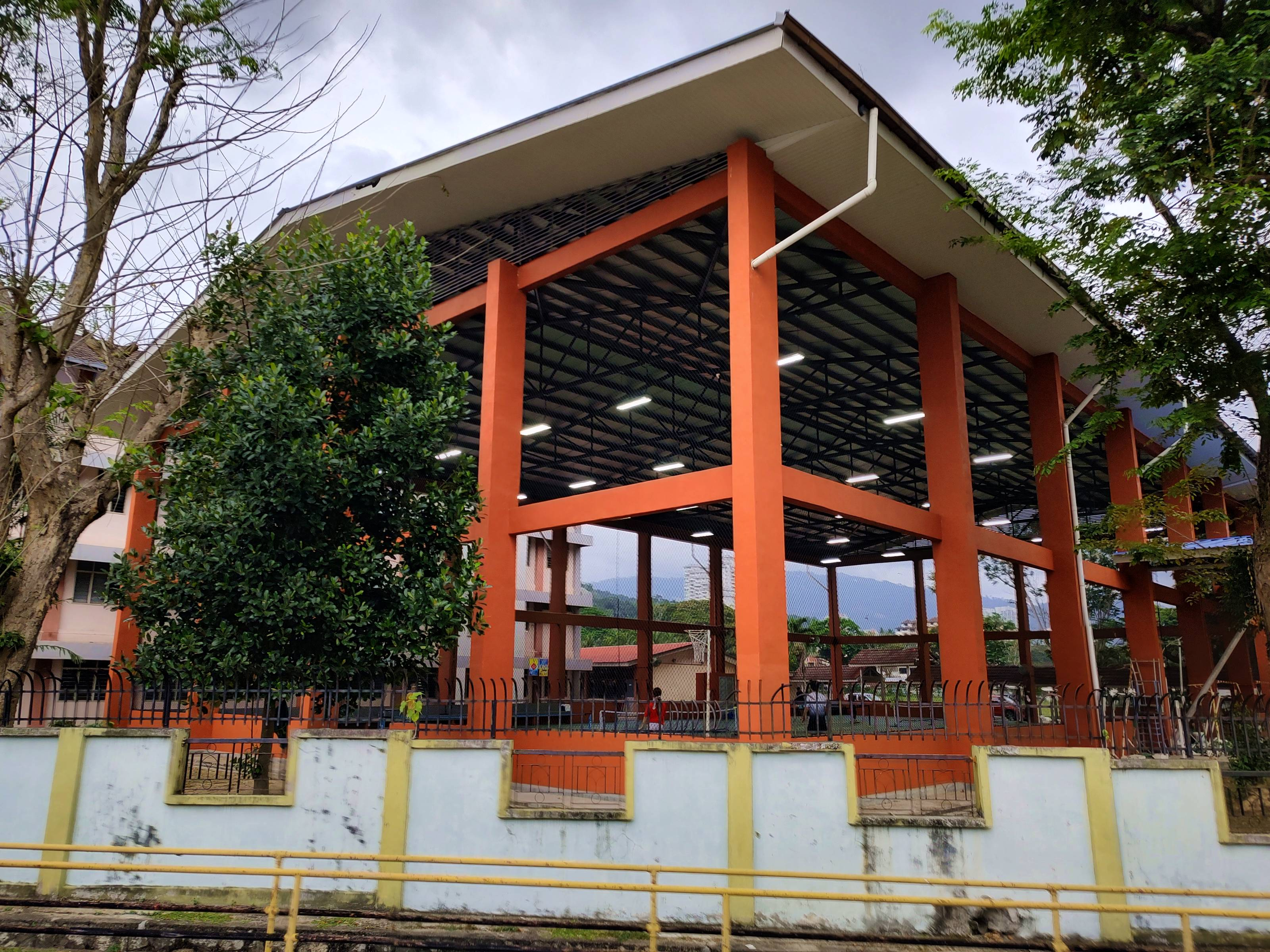
- SMK Hamid Khan covered arena

Hamid Khan National Secondary School (Malay: Sekolah Menengah Kebangsaan Hamid Khan) is a secondary school (high school) in Island Glades, Jelutong, Georgetown, Penang, Malaysia.

== History of the school ==
By the end of 1976, this school had two blocks (two storeys high) which consists of a general office, principal's office, vice principal's office, teacher's room, a library, two science labs, an art room and fourteen classrooms.

Originally, it was an all-girls school which was called Island Glades Girls School. It was then changed to Island Glades National Secondary School (Malay: Sekolah Menengah Kebangsaan Island Glades) as they changed it into a mixed school. Finally, the name Hamid Khan National Secondary School (Malay: Sekolah Menengah Kebangsaan Hamid Khan) was given in honour of Tan Sri Abdul Hamid Khan (1900–1974) who was the Minister of Education from 1962 to 1969 under the premiership of Tunku Abdul Rahman and President of the Dewan Negara from 1971 to 1973.

In 1977, this school had 272 students and twelve teachers. The school was officiated by the then-Deputy Education Minister, Dato' Salleh Jafaruddin on 25 July 1977.

== List of Principals ==
- 1977-1979: Tan Cheng Ee
- 1979: Ung Kim Cheng
- 1980-1982: Ang Thoon Seng
- 1982: Leow Lim Hai
- 1982–1987: Haji Mohd. Ismail bin Ibramsa
- 1987–1989: Haji Mohd. Daud bin Haji Mohamed
- 1990–1992: Mohd Tahir bin Mydin
- 1992–1994: Ahmad bin Hashim
- 1994–1996: Azlan bin Abu Bakar
- 1997–1999: Shaikh Mohamed bin Shaikh Ahmad Baladram
- 1999–2004: Lee Teong Aun
- 2004–2009: Joseph Wong Kee Kuok
- 2009–2014: Norizan binti Abd. Rashid
- 2014–2019: Baskaran a/l Karuppiah (K. Baskaran)
- 2019–2024: Thirumamani a/l Sundaraj (S. Thirumamani)
- 2024-current -:Sharon Kaur a/p Santokh Singh
