= Heng Ee High School =

Chinese secondary school in Malaysia

Heng Ee National Type Chinese High School
- Sekolah Menengah Jenis Kebangsaan Cina Heng Ee 恒毅国民型华文中学
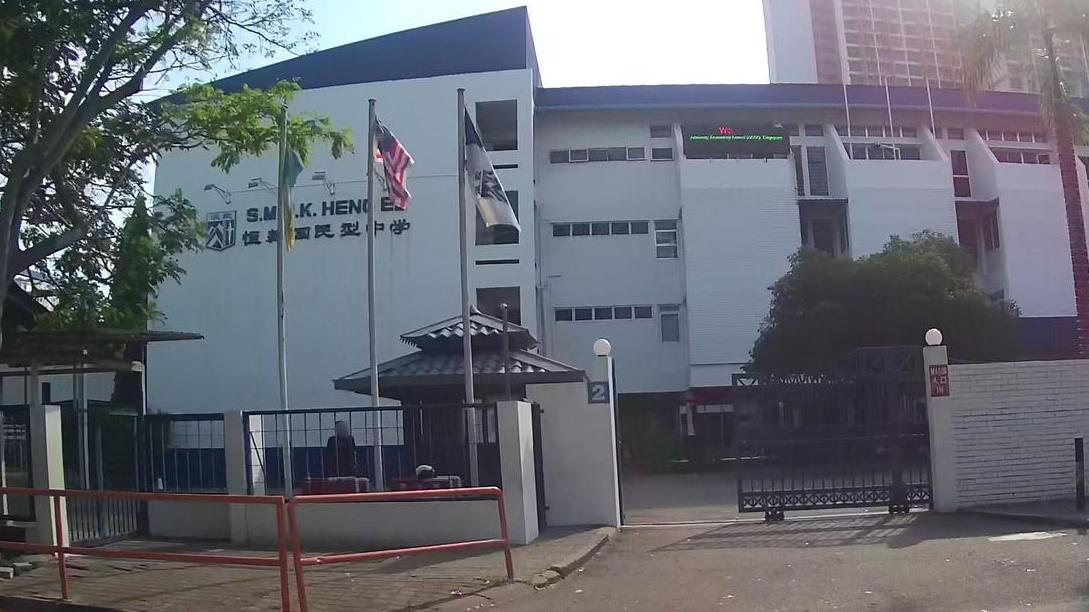

Location
- Jalan Hamilton off Terengganu Road, Jelutong, Georgetown, Penang, Malaysia
- 5°24′08″N 100°18′34″E

Information
- Type: Public school
- Motto: 勤学敬业 (To contrive and to serve)
- Religious affiliation: Christian
- Denomination: Roman Catholic Church
- Established: 9 September 1957
- School code: PEB1103
- Principal: Mdm. Loh Soo Ping (卢思冰)
- Gender: Coeducational
- Enrollment: 3916
- Affiliations: Heng Ee Kindergarten; Heng Ee Primary School
- Founders: Dato' Father A. Julien, MEP
- Website: hengee.smjk.my

Heng Ee National Type Chinese High School
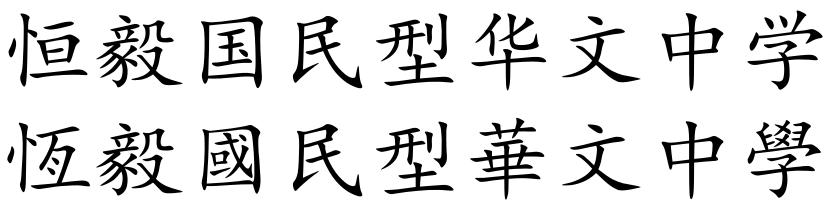
- Heng Ee National Type Chinese High School in Simplified Chinese (top) and Traditional Chinese character (bottom)
- Traditional Chinese: 恆毅國民型華文中學
- Simplified Chinese: 恒毅国民型华文中学
Transcriptions
Standard Mandarin
- Hanyu Pinyin: Héng Yì Guó Mín Xíng Huá Wén Zhōng Xué
Southern Min
- Hokkien POJ: Hêng-gī Kok-bîn-hêng Hôa-bûn Tiong-o̍h

Heng Ee High School
- Traditional Chinese: 恆毅中學
- Simplified Chinese: 恒毅中学
Transcriptions
Standard Mandarin
- Hanyu Pinyin: Héng Yì Zhōng Xué
Southern Min
- Hokkien POJ: Hêng-gī Tiong-o̍h

Heng Ee High School, officially the Heng Ee National Type Chinese High School (simplified Chinese: 恒毅国民型华文中学; traditional Chinese: 恆毅國民型華文中學; Pe̍h-ōe-jī: Hêng-gī kok-bîn-hêng huâ-bûn tiong-o̍h; Malay: Sekolah Menengah Jenis Kebangsaan Cina Heng Ee) is a National-type Chinese Catholic secondary school located in George Town, Penang. There is also another branch of the same name, Heng Ee Cawangan Bayan Baru, near the Penang Airport.

== Founding ==
Heng Ee High School was founded by a Belgian Roman Catholic expatriate missionary priest, Dato' Father Arthur A. Julien, from the Paris Foreign Missions Society in 1957.

Father Julien arrived in Malaysia in 1952. He served as parish priest of the Church of Our Lady of Sorrows from 1961 to 1963, and as assistant parish priest to the Church of the Holy Spirit (now Cathedral of the Holy Spirit) with Father Paul Decroix between 1976 and 1984. Father Julien's work extended beyond the church. He conducted missionary work with the community in Batu Maung, Bayan Lepas and Sungai Dua, and also regularly visited the detainees in Pulau Jerejak. His ability to converse in Mandarin and later Hokkien, endeared him to the local Chinese community.

Father Julien set up Heng Ee High School along Hamilton Road and Heng Ee Primary School within the grounds of the Church of Our Lady of Sorrows along Macalister Road. He died on 11 September 2004.

== School principals ==
1968 - January 1973	Mr. Vincent Chang Chor Yew
February 1973 - December 1993	Mr. Tan Chuan Huat
February 1994 - January 1999	Mr. Phuah Chor Poay
January 1999 - August 2004	Mr. Teoh Kheng Hong
September 2004 – February 2014	Mr. Goh Boon Poh
March 2014 - 1 April 2016	Mr. Low Lim Wah
1 April 2016 - Current	Mdm. Loh Soo Ping

== School History ==
Date	Event
1957	The original premises of Heng Ee High School was located on a piece of land leased from the Convent Primary School which was then owned by the Tamil Catholic Church. Heng Ee was initially a private school built for the purpose of helping the destitute and overage Chinese students to obtain a formal Chinese education.
1961	The Catholic Church spent RM125,000 on the purchase of six acres of land located between Hamilton Road and Free School Road to build Heng Ee High School.
1966	A permit from the Ministry of Education was obtained to build the school.
1967	Heng Ee High School began operations by borrowing seven classrooms from Heng Ee Primary School while waiting for the completion of the construction of its own building. There were 280 students enrolled at that instance. Block A, the first block of the four-storey building was completed. Secondary school children studying at the borrowed classrooms of Heng Ee Primary School were then transferred to the newly constructed secondary school building in the month of September. In the same year, Heng Ee High School received a grant from the Government and was converted into a national type secondary school bearing the name of SMJK Heng Ee.
1969	The construction of Block B was completed.
1970	An adjoining block (Block C) of building linking Block A and Block B was completed.
1972	The school saw a marked increase in its student enrolment, ranging from the Remove Form to Form Five. There were altogether 37 classes with a total number of 1228 students.
1975	Block D was built.
1987	The school saw a further increase in student enrolment. By then the student enrolment had reached 1800. The rapid increase in enrolment made the existing educational facilities inadequate. Further expansion became necessary to cater for the increasing enrolment. The School Board of Governors then decided to build another block of building to accommodate the increasing number of students. The planned development of the new block (Block E) soon got underway.
1990	The planned development of Block E materialised when the building was successfully completed and equipped with all necessary facilities.
1991	The School Board of Governors decided to convert Heng Ee High School, a school exclusively for boys to a co-educational school.
1999	Student enrolment increased to 2300 and that prompted the Board of Governors to top-up another floor on Block E.
2001	The school soared to greater heights of success when it saw a marked improvement in its academic performance in the SPM examinations. This prompted the Ministry of Education to approve the setting-up of Form Six Science Classes.
2003	Excellent academic achievements in the STPM examinations again prompted the Ministry of Education to approve the setting up of Form Six Humanities Classes. The Guang Ming Award was bestowed upon the late Dato' Reverend Father Arthur Julien for his lifetime commitment in ensuring that the underprivileged Chinese students derived the full benefit of a Chinese education.
2004	The Lim Lean Gaik Award was bestowed upon the late Dato' Reverend Father Arthur Julien.
2005	The school received the Most Distinguished School Award in Cultural Stage Performance on 18 December 2005 during the 5th Malaysian Xin-Chuan Cultural Stage Performance Award held in Kuala Lumpur.
2007	The school rose above the challenge when it won the Sunlight Prize and the Best Conductor Prize in the 4th Beijing International Competition of Youth Chinese Orchestra held on 11 August 2007. Heng Ee High School celebrated its Golden Jubilee on 9 September with much pomp and ceremony. A grand dinner was held in the school field to celebrate this special occasion.
2008	The Penang Municipal Council finally approved the sale of the two plots of land worth RM819,200 to Heng Ee High School to enable it to carry out its expansion project. Heng Ee High School was awarded the School Excellence Award for the Co-Curricular Category by the Ministry of Education on 4 November 2008.
2009	Penang Municipal Council gave its seal of approval to the architect's plan of Bangunan Wawasan (Block F) on 2 July 2009. Construction works commenced on 21 November. The new school canteen began operations on 28 September 2009. For the first time in the history of Heng Ee, student enrolment hit a record high of 3000.
2010	Heng Ee High School hit a record enrolment of 3200 students, the highest in the school history. It has also put Heng Ee High School as the school with the second highest student enrolment in the state of Penang. The construction of Bangunan Wawasan (Block F) was completed at the end of the year 2010. A milestone was set when three Form 4 students received three Gold Awards with their invention of FloodWarn, a flood-warning detector. Another milestone was set in the month of July 2010 when Heng Ee High School's performing arts bodies brought glory to the school. The School Choir won a Gold Award and an International Friendship Award in the 10th China International Choir competition. The Chinese Cultural Dance Troupe secured two Gold Awards in the 2010 China-Asean Youth Dance Interaction and Competition and the Harmonica Band won three Gold Medals and four Silver Medals in the Asia Pacific Harmonica Competition. Heng Ee High School was presented the Champion Award for the Co-curricular Category (Clubs and Societies) by the MOE on 11 November 2010.
2011	Heng Ee High School hit a record-breaking enrolment of 3271 students. it is now the school with the highest student enrolment in Penang. On 9 June 2011, the Chinese Orchestra was invited to a Cultural and Musical Exchange Programme at the Experimental School of Shanghai Conservatory of Music. While the Chinese Orchestra was in Shanghai, they also had a musical exchange session with the Nanjing Arts Institute. On 13 June, the problem of floating classes for both Lower and Upper Six students was finally solved when the classes were finally moved to the newly built classrooms housed in Bangunan Wawasan. On 14 July 2011, the School Choir ventured to Taiwan and took part in the Orientale Concentus 1V International Choral Festival which was organised by the Singapore Federation for Choral Music. Our School Choir won two awards; a Gold Award in the Mixed choir for the Youth Category and the Most Promising Choir Award. On 9 September 2011, the newly built extension building was launched. Present to officiate the building were the Chief Minister of Penang, Lim Guan Eng, the school's board of director Dato' Loh Geok Beng and chamber president Tan Sri Tan Kok Ping.

== Amenities ==
=== Block F: Bangunan Wawasan ===
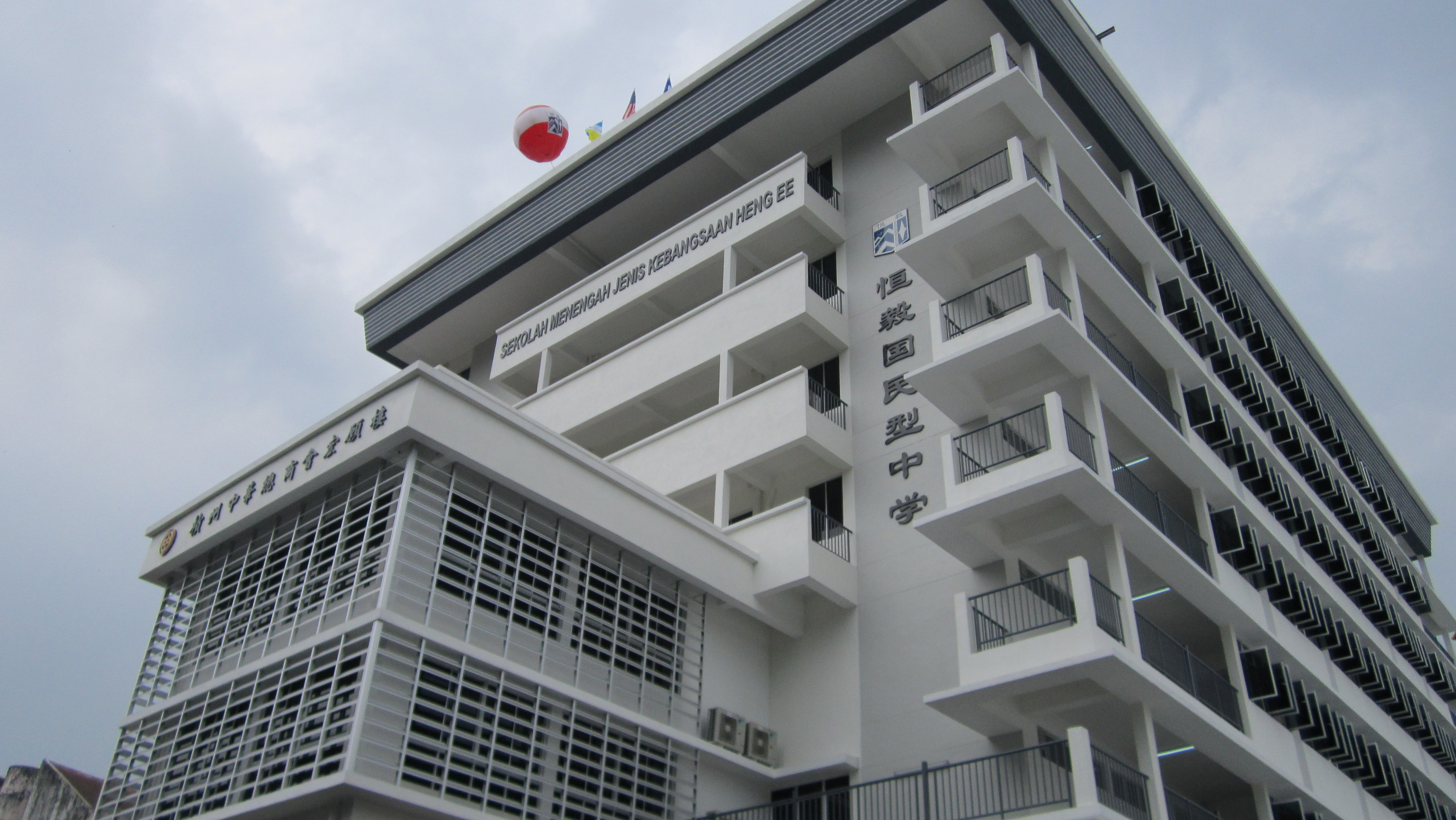
View of Bangunan Wawasan from Free School Road

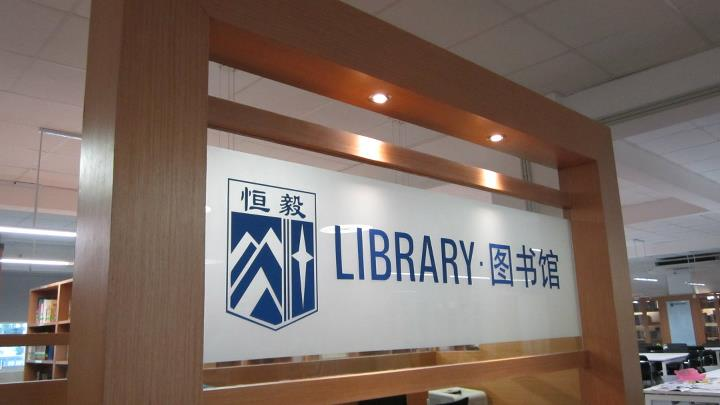
The school library at Level 2

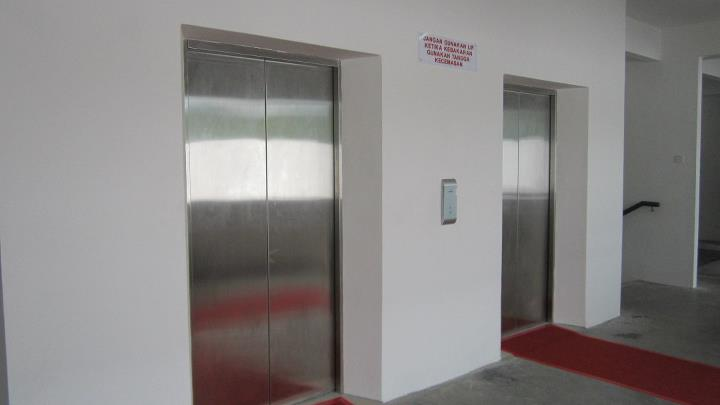
Bangunan Wawasan is equipped with two elevators to transport teachers plus students with difficulties going up stairs throughout the building

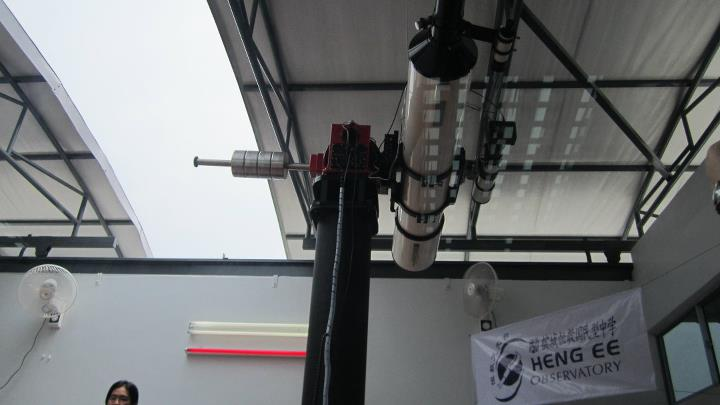
APM-TMB 2050/228 F9 APO Telescope in Heng Ee Observatory, used for star glazing

The Bangunan Wawasan (Chinese: 宏愿楼) was built in 2011. The eight-story Bangunan Wawasan comprises a foyer at Level 1, a fully air-conditioned modern library at Level 2, two multi-purpose halls at Level 3, three lecture theatres at Level 4, a rooftop loft and an astronomical observatory at the rooftop. Bangunan Wawasan is also equipped with the necessary infrastructure and ICT facilities to provide the students with a positive and supportive environment that is conducive for academic and social growth.

Penang Chinese Chamber of Commerce had donated RM2 mil for the construction of Bangunan Wawasan along with other efforts and sponsors. This prompted the school board of directors to rename the building as Bangunan Wawasan Penang Chinese Chamber of Commerce.

The building was officially launched on 9 September 2011. Present to officiate the new building were the Chief Minister, Heng Ee board of trustees chairman Datuk Loh Geok Beng, and chamber president Tan Sri Tan Kok Ping.

=== Sports facilities ===
The sports infrastructures in this school include two basketball courts and two volleyball courts located opposite the school (where the ex-pupils association is), a mini gymnasium(not open to students who are not in the Body Building Club)on Level 1 of Block E, two badminton courts in the school hall, a football field and a 6 lane 100 meter running track. There is also table tennis tables situated in the school hall which can be set up.

=== Canteen ===
The original location of the school canteen was at Level 1 of Block D which was the current staffroom. Years later, it was moved to a bigger site beside Block E. Due to the school's expansion plan for the 8-storey Bangunan Wawasan, the canteen was demolished and moved to a temporary site behind Block B while waiting for the completion of Bangunan Wawasan. At first the school planned to rebuild the canteen at Level 1 of Bangunan Wawasan. As the number of students increased gradually over the years, the school decided to make it permanent instead of shifting back to its original site. At the same time, three ventilating machines were installed.
