= Penang State Route P198 =

Road in Malaysia

Penang Route 198
- Jalan Sungai Dua
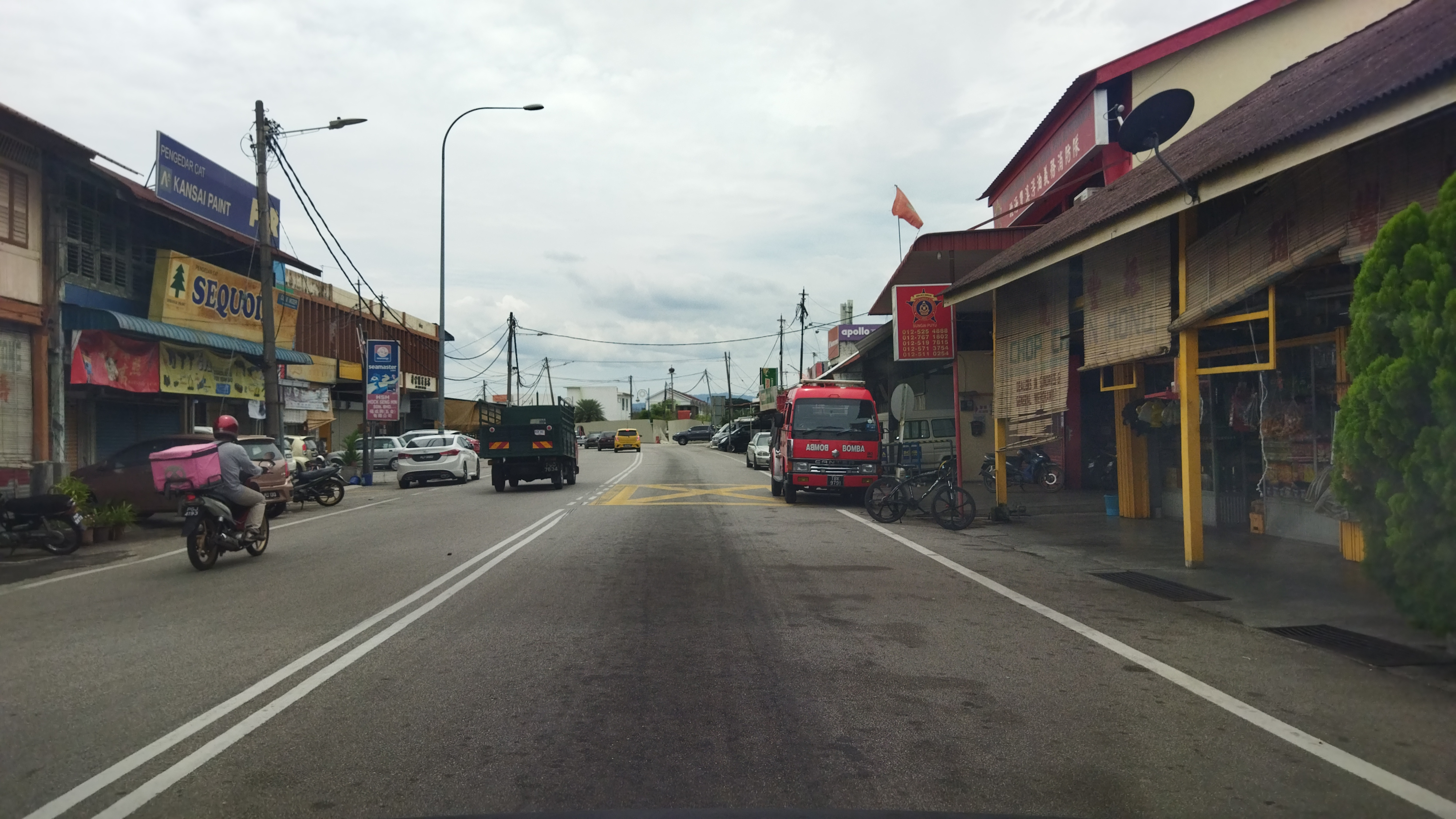

Major junctions
- West end: Bagan Ajam
- FT 1 Federal route 1 Butterworth Outer Ring Road Butterworth Outer Ring Road; North–South Expressway Northern Route AH2 North–South Expressway Northern Route; P205 Jalan Lahar Yooi; P188 Jalan Kubang Semang
- South end: Permatang Pasir

Location
- Country: Malaysia
- Primary destinations: Sungai Puyu; Sungai Dua

Highway system
- Highways in Malaysia; Expressways; Federal; State

Jalan Sungai Dua (Penang state road P198) is a major road on the mainland in Penang, Malaysia.

There is another Jalan Sungai Dua P15 in the Gelugor vicinity on the island in Penang.

== List of junctions ==
Km	Exit	Junctions	To	Remarks
		Bagan Ajam–Sungai Puyu	see also Butterworth Outer Ring Road Butterworth Outer Ring Road	
		Sungai Puyu	North; Jalan Kampung Benggali; Kampung Benggali South; Jalan Bagan Lalang; Bagan Lalang; Mak Mandin	Junctions
		Jalan Pekan Darat	North; P207 Jalan Pekan Darat; Permatang To'Jaya; Kepala Batas	Junctions
		Sungai Lokan		
		Permatang Chetak		
		Permatang Chetak–Sungai Dua Interchange	see also Butterworth Outer Ring Road Butterworth Outer Ring Road	
		Sungai Dua-NSE	North–South Expressway Northern Route AH2 North–South Expressway Northern Route; North; Bukit Kayu Hitam; Alor Star; Bertam; South; Kuala Lumpur; Penang; Permatang Pauh	Diamond Interchange
		Sungai Dua	Northeast; P205 Jalan Lahar Yooi; Lahar Yooi; Padang Menora	T-junctions
		Sungai Perai bridge		
		Jalan Tanjung Putus	West; P194 Jalan Tanjung Putus; Kampung Tanjung Putus	T-junctions
		Permatang Pasir	P188 Jalan Kubang Semang; West; Permatang Pauh; Butterworth; East; Kubang Semang	T-junctions
