= Sungai Dua (disambiguation) =

Sungai Dua is a residential neighbourhood within the city of George Town in Penang, Malaysia.

Sungai Dua may also refer to:

- Sungai Dua, Butterworth, township in Butterworth, Seberang Perai, Penang, Malaysia
- Sungai Dua (state constituency), state constituency in Penang, Malaysia
