= Butterworth Outer Ring Road =

Road in Malaysia

Expressway 17
- Butterworth Outer Ring Road
- BORR shown in red
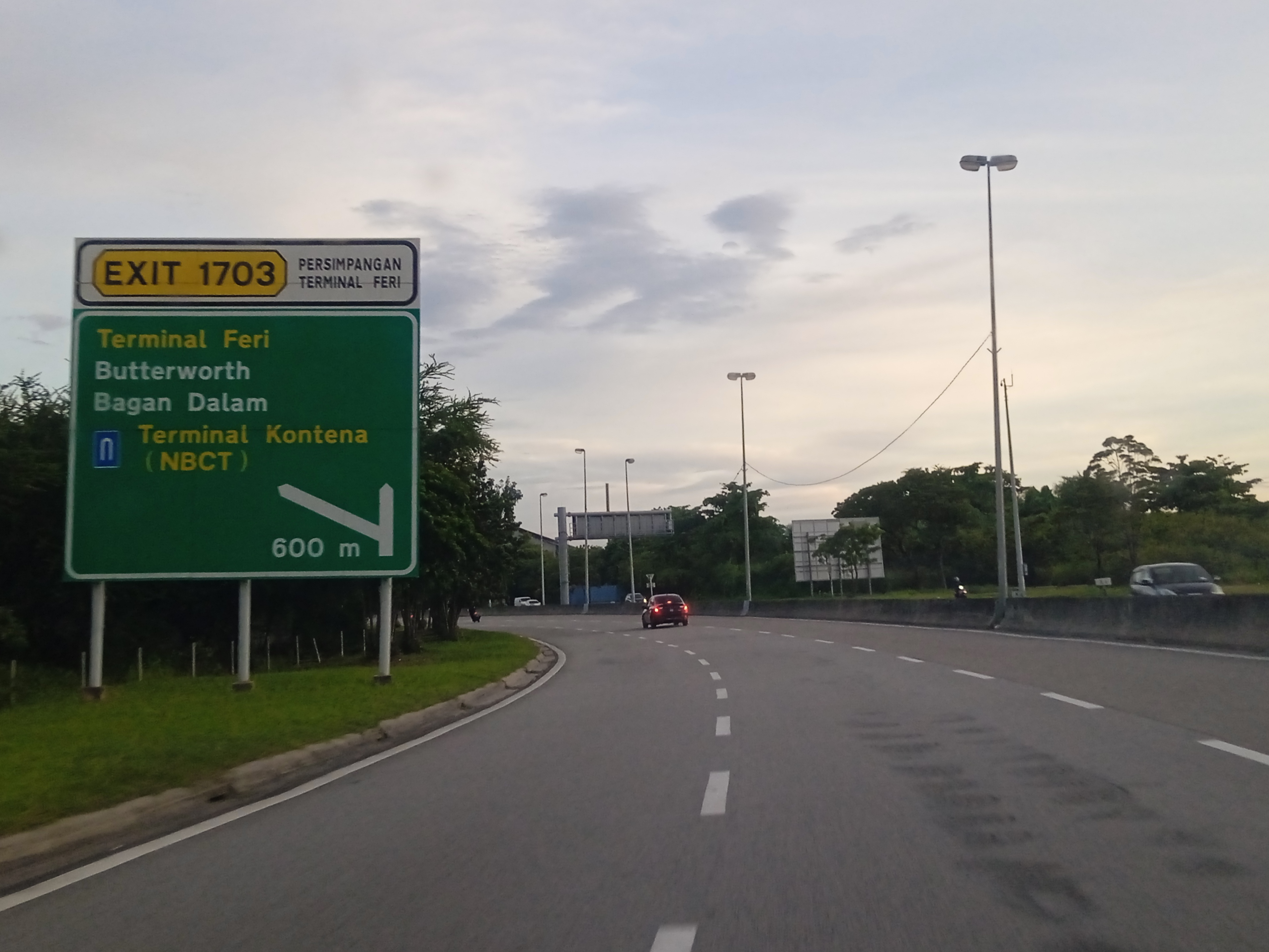

Route information
- Maintained by Lingkaran Luar Butterworth Sdn Bhd (LLB)
- Length: 14 km (8.7 mi)
- Existed: 2003–present
- History: Completed in 2005

Major junctions
- Beltway around Butterworth, Penang
- From: Sungai Dua
- North–South Expressway Northern Route / AH2; P198 Jalan Sungai Dua; Penang Bridge FT 4 (Butterworth–Seberang Jaya Toll Road) / AH140; FT 1 Jalan Chain Ferry; FT 3112 Jalan Perusahan Perai; FT 1 Butterworth–Juru Highway
- To: Perai

Location
- Country: Malaysia
- Primary destinations: Bagan Lalang, Sungai Puyu, Bagan Ajam, Butterworth

Highway system
- Highways in Malaysia; Expressways; Federal; State

Butterworth Outer Ring Road (BORR) (Malay: Lebuhraya Lingkaran Luar Butterworth) is a coastal expressway located in Butterworth, Penang, Malaysia. This 14 km (8.7 mi) expressway connects Sungai Dua in the north until Perai in the south.

== Route background ==
The zeroth kilometre of the expressway is located at Sungai Dua Interchange. Ships can be seen near Bagan Ajam Rest Area. The Penang Megamall is located at the end of the highway. It is a six-lane line and it is also the connecting highway to Federal Route 1, from which north bound traffic will bring travelers to Alor Setar and beyond while motorists travelling south can head to Ipoh and beyond.

== History ==
Construction began in 2003 and work was completed in 2006. The expressway was open to motorists in January 2007. As Sungai Nyior residents protested against high toll rate in February 2007, the Sungai Nyior toll booth collection was postponed by the Ministry of Works.

This highway is built to reduce the heavy traffic on the Sungai Dua–Juru NSE in the rushing hours and the holiday seasons. Nowadays, it is also used by residents in the Raja Uda area to head to Perai and the Megamall Pinang.

The people of Raja Uda area can also travel on the highway to head to the Sunway Carnival Mall.

The highway will bring motorists from both the south and the north to the ferry terminal for faster and cheaper ferry-crossing to Penang bypassing the Penang Bridge congestion.

== Features ==
Notable features of the expressway include Sungai Prai Bridge over the Perai River and Sungai Maklom Bridge over the Maklom River.

== Tolls ==
The Butterworth Outer Ring Road uses open toll systems.

=== Electronic Toll Collections (ETC) ===
As part of an initiative to facilitate faster transactions at the Perai, Bagan Ajam and Sungai Nyior Toll Plazas, all toll transactions at the two toll plazas are conducted electronically using Touch 'n Go cards or SmartTAGs since 1 June 2016.

=== Toll rates ===
(Since 15 October 2015)

Class	Types of vehicles	Rate (in Malaysian Ringgit (RM))		
Class	Types of vehicles	Prai	Bagan Ajam	Sungai Nyior
0	Motorcycles (Vehicles with two axles and two wheels)	Free		
1	Private Cars (Vehicles with two axles and three or four wheels (excluding taxi and bus))	1.50		1.20
2	Vans and other small good vehicles (Vehicles with two axles and six wheels (excluding bus))	3.00		2.40
3	Large Trucks (Vehicles with three or more axles (excluding bus))	4.50		3.60
4	Taxis	0.80		0.60
5	Buses	1.30	1.20	0.90

== Junction lists ==
The entire route is located in Seberang Perai (Mainland), Penang.

Legend:

- I/C - Interchange, I/S - Intersection, RSA - Rest and service area, OBR - Overhead bridge restaurant, R/R - Restaurant and rest plaza, L/B - Layby, V/P - Vista point, TN - tunnel, T/P - Toll plaza, BR - Bridge
- C - Cloverleaf, S - Stack, T-A - Trumpet-A, T-B - Trumpet-B, DT - Directional-T/Y, SDT - Semi-Directional-T/Y, P-Y - Partial-Y, D - Diamond, P-C - Partial cloverleaf, D-D - Diverging diamond, D-R - Direct ramp

District	Location	km	mi	Exit	Name	Destinations	Notes
North Seberang Perai	Sungai Dua			Continues as P198 Jalan Sungai Dua			
North Seberang Perai	Sungai Dua	0.0	0.0	165	Sungai Dua I/C	North–South Expressway Northern Route / AH2 – Bukit Kayu Hitam, Alor Setar, Bertam, Permatang Pauh, Penang Island, Ipoh, Kuala Lumpur Butterworth–Kulim Expressway / FT 4 / AH140 – Gerik, Kulim	Diamond interchange with E1 expressway as priority, controlled by traffic lights
North Seberang Perai	Sungai Dua			–	Unnamed	P198 Jalan Sungai Puyu – Mak Mandin, Sungai Puyu	T-junctions on both directions; Start/End of concurrency with route P198
North Seberang Perai	Sungai Puyu			1707	Bagan Lalang I/C	Jalan Padang Lalang – Mak Mandin; P198 Jalan Sungai Puyu – Bagan Lalang, Kampung Benggali	Diamond interchange
North Seberang Perai	Sungai Puyu			–	Unnamed	P198 Jalan Sungai Puyu	Eastbound exit only, westbound entrance only; T-junction; Start/End of concurrency with route P198
North Seberang Perai	Bagan Ajam			–	Unnamed	P191 Jalan Raja Uda – Residential Area, Raja Uda Industrial Estate	Eastbound exit towards north, westbound exit towards south; T-junctions on both directions
North Seberang Perai	Bagan Ajam			1706	Bagan Ajam I/C	FT 1 Jalan Bagan Ajam – Alor Setar, Sungai Petani, Butterworth	Diamond interchange; Route P198 terminates here
North Seberang Perai	Bagan Ajam			Bagan Ajam Toll Plaza			
North Seberang Perai	Butterworth			1704	Container Terminal (NBCT) I/C	FT 4 (Jalan Heng Choon Thian) / AH140 – North Butterworth Container Terminal (NBCT-Sungai Nyior side), Butterworth Butterworth–Kulim Expressway / FT 4 / AH140 – Seberang Jaya (Sunway), Tesco Extra, Kulim	Diamond interchange
North Seberang Perai	Butterworth			1703	Ferry Terminal I/C	P186 Jalan Metcher – Butterworth, Butterworth Bus Terminal, Butterworth Train Station, Penang Ferry Service (to Penang Island)	Diamond interchange
North Seberang Perai	Butterworth			1702A/B	Bagan Dalam / Dermaga Dalam I/C	P191 Jalan Assumption – Bagan Luar Industrial Area, Bagan Dalam	Full access to northwestbound users, no access to southeastbound users unless taking exit 1704
North Seberang Perai–Central Seberang Perai district border				Perai River Bridge; 1.85 km			
Central Seberang Perai	Perai			Perai Lama Toll Plaza			
Central Seberang Perai	Perai			1701	Perai Lama I/C	FT 1 Jalan Chain Ferry – Chain Ferry, Seberang Jaya; FT 3112 Jalan Perusahan Perai – Perai Industrial Estate	Diamond interchange; No access for north bound users to turn right unless taking Penang Bridge highway at exit 161.
Central Seberang Perai	Perai			–	Unnamed	Perai Jaya (Megamall)	Controlled by traffic lights
Central Seberang Perai	Perai			162	Perai I/C	North–South Expressway Northern Route / AH2 – Bukit Kayu Hitam, Alor Setar, Permatang Pauh, Penang Island, Ipoh, Kuala Lumpur Butterworth–Kulim Expressway / FT 4 / AH140 – Gerik, Kulim	Partial cloverleaf interchange with E1 expressway as priority, partially controlled by traffic lights
Central Seberang Perai	Perai			Continues as FT 1 Butterworth–Juru Highway			
1.000 mi = 1.609 km; 1.000 km = 0.621 mi: Concurrency terminus; Electronic toll collection; Incomplete access
