= Muhamad Yusoff Mohd Noor =

Malaysian politician

Yang Berbahagia Dato' Muhamad Yusoff Mohd Noor DSPN
- محمد يوسف محمد نور

State Leader of the Opposition of Penang
- In office 2 August 2018 – 28 June 2023
- Governor: Abdul Rahman Abbas (2018–2021); Ahmad Fuzi Abdul Razak (since 2021)
- Chief Minister: Chow Kon Yeow
- Preceded by: Jahara Hamid
- Succeeded by: Muhammad Fauzi Yusoff
- Constituency: Sungai Dua

Member of the Penang State Legislative Assembly for Sungai Dua
- In office 5 May 2013 – 12 August 2023
- Preceded by: Jasmin Mohamed (BN–UMNO)
- Succeeded by: Muhammad Fauzi Yusoff (PN–PAS)
- Majority: 357 (2013); 2,203 (2018)

Personal details
- Born: 30 March 1963 (age 63) Pekan Darat, Sungai Dua, Penang, Federation of Malaya
- Citizenship: Malaysian
- Party: United Malays National Organisation (UMNO)
- Other political affiliations: Barisan Nasional (BN); Perikatan Nasional (PN) (aligned); Muafakat Nasional (MN)
- Occupation: Politician

Muhamad Yusoff bin Mohd Noor is a Malaysian politician who has served as State Leader of the Opposition of Penang from August 2018 to August 2023 and Member of the Penang State Legislative Assembly (MLA) for Sungai Dua from May 2013 to August 2023 He is a member of the United Malays National Organisation (UMNO), a component party of the state opposition but federal ruling Barisan Nasional (BN) coalition.

== Election results ==
Penang State Legislative Assembly
Year	Constituency	Candidate	Votes	Pct	Opponent(s)	Votes	Pct	Ballots cast	Majority	Turnout
2013	N05 Sungai Dua	Muhamad Yusoff Mohd Noor (UMNO)	7,951	50.00%	Zahadi Mohd (PAS)	7,594	47.80%	16,089	357	90.00%
2013	N05 Sungai Dua	Muhamad Yusoff Mohd Noor (UMNO)	7,951	50.00%	Mohd Shariff Omar (IND)	344	2.20%	16,089	357	90.00%
2018	N05 Sungai Dua	Muhamad Yusoff Mohd Noor (UMNO)	7,314	41.10%	Zahadi Mohd (PAS)	5,380	30.20%	18,066	2,203	87.90%
2018	N05 Sungai Dua	Muhamad Yusoff Mohd Noor (UMNO)	7,314	41.10%	Yusri Isahak (AMANAH)	5,115	28.70%	18,066	2,203	87.90%

Parliament of Malaysia
Year	Constituency	Candidate	Votes	Pct	Opponent(s)	Votes	Pct	Ballots cast	Majority	Turnout
2022	P042 Tasek Gelugor	Muhamad Yusoff Mohd Noor (UMNO)	18,864	28.11%	Wan Saiful Wan Jan (BERSATU)	31,116	46.36%	67,112	12,252	82.99%
2022	P042 Tasek Gelugor	Muhamad Yusoff Mohd Noor (UMNO)	18,864	28.11%	Razak Ridzuan (AMANAH)	16,547	24.66%	67,112	12,252	82.99%
2022	P042 Tasek Gelugor	Muhamad Yusoff Mohd Noor (UMNO)	18,864	28.11%	Abdul Halim Sirjung (PEJUANG)	406	0.60%	67,112	12,252	82.99%
2022	P042 Tasek Gelugor	Muhamad Yusoff Mohd Noor (UMNO)	18,864	28.11%	Mohd Akmal Azhar (WARISAN)	179	0.27%	67,112	12,252	82.99%

== Honours ==
- Penang
  - Officer of the Order of the Defender of State (DSPN) – Dato' (2019)
