= Minden Heights =

Neighbourhood of George Town in Penang, Malaysia

- Neighbourhood of George Town
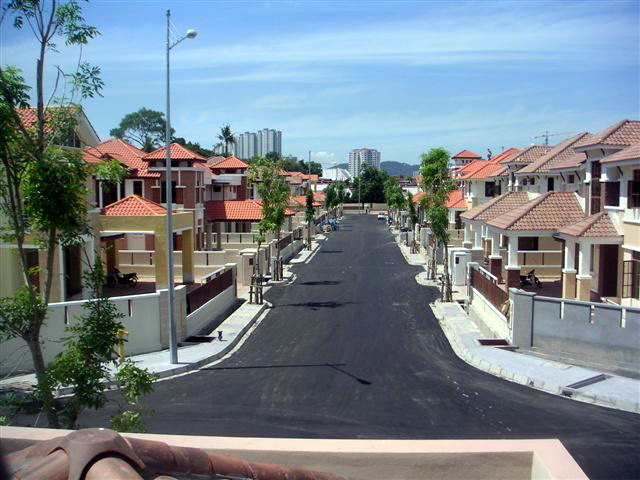
- Interactive map of Minden Heights
- Location within George Town in Penang
- Coordinates: 5°21′53.391″N 100°18′18.9936″E
- Country: Malaysia
- State: Penang
- City: George Town
- District: Northeast
- Time zone: UTC+8 (MST)
  - Summer (DST): Not observed
- Postal code: 11700

Minden Heights is a residential neighbourhood within the city of George Town in the Malaysian state of Penang. Located 6.1 km (3.8 mi) south of the city centre, this upscale housing estate lies within the Gelugor suburb and neighbours Universiti Sains Malaysia to the south, as well as Taman Tun Sardon to the north.

== Etymology ==
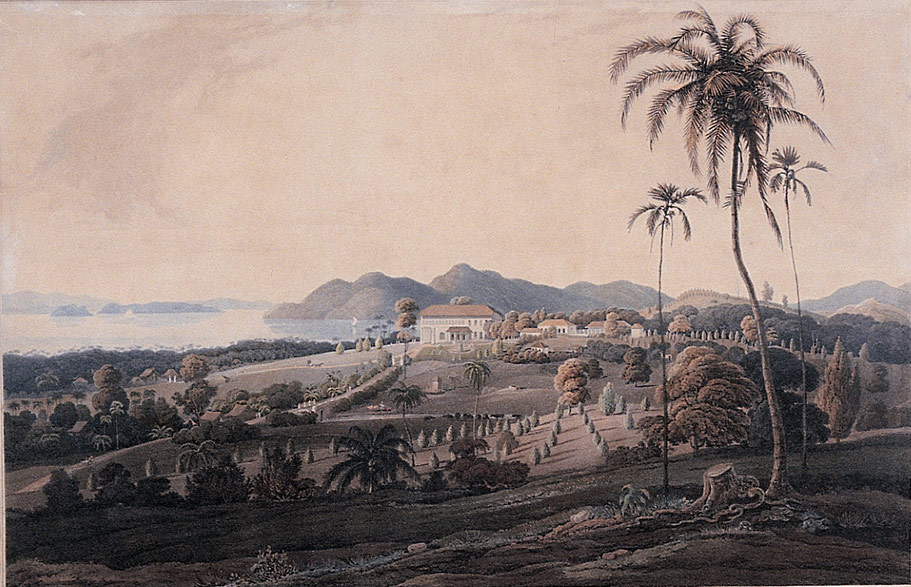
An 1818 aquatint depicting Glugor House, which would be converted into the Minden Barracks in 1939.

Minden Heights was named after the Minden Barracks, which was established in the area by the British Army in 1939. The barracks has since been subsumed as part of Universiti Sains Malaysia.

== History ==
Minden Heights was first developed as a housing estate by Dr Che Lah, an ethnic Malay councillor of the Penang Island Municipal Council (now Penang Island City Council). The neighbourhood, which borders Universiti Sains Malaysia's main campus, was completed in 1975, four years prior to the opening of the university's medical school.

== Transportation ==
Rapid Penang bus routes 102, 301, 303, 304 and 401 include stops along Jalan Sultan Azlan Shah, which marks the eastern limits of Minden Heights.

== Education ==
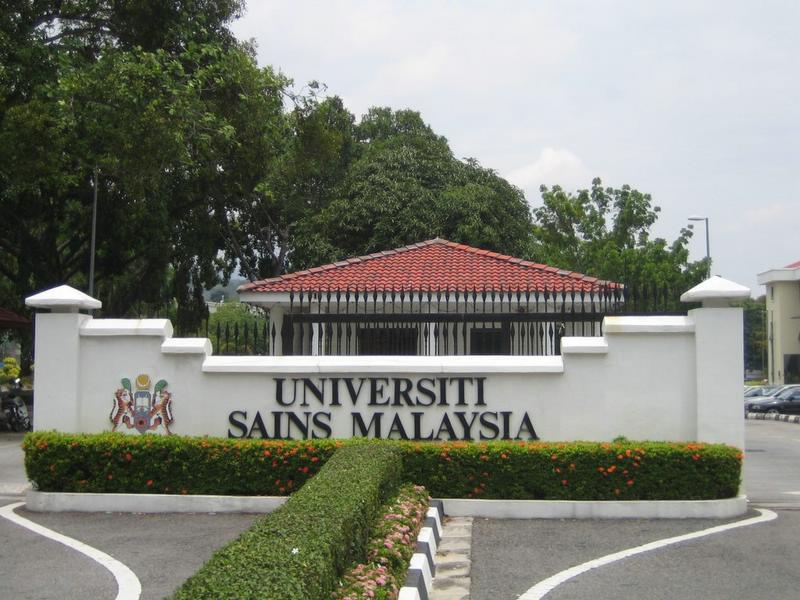
The main campus of Universiti Sains Malaysia is situated south of Minden Heights.

Universiti Sains Malaysia (USM), Penang's premier public university, is situated immediately south of Minden Heights. One of the top Malaysian public universities, USM was ranked fifth within Malaysia by the QS World University Rankings as of 2016.

In addition, two primary schools are situated within Minden Heights.

- SK Minden Height
- SRK Sungai Gelugor

== See also ==
- Taman Tun Sardon
- Gelugor
