= Engineering Campus =

Engineering Campus may refer to:

- Engineering Campus (University of Illinois Urbana-Champaign)
- Engineering Campus, Universiti Sains Malaysia

== See also ==
- List of engineering schools
