= Phor Tay High School =

School in Gelugor, Penang, Malaysia

Phor Tay National Type Chinese High School
- 菩提国民型华文中学; Sekolah Menengah Jenis Kebangsaan Cina Phor Tay

Location
- 731 Jalan Sungai Dua 11700; Gelugor, Penang; Malaysia; 5°20′34.00″N 100°17′47.00″E

Information
- Type: National-type Chinese secondary school
- Motto: Humanity, Mindfulness, Diligence, Perseverance (仁慎勤毅)
- Established: 1935
- Principal: Lim Geaik Hong (since 2020)
- Teaching staff: 143 (2024)
- Gender: Mixed
- Enrollment: 2003 (2024)
- Student Union/Association: Persatuan Bekas Murid-Murid Sekolah Phor Tay
- Affiliations: Phor Tay Institution; Phor Tay Kindergarten; Phor Tay Primary School; Phor Tay Private High School

Phor Tay National Type Chinese High School
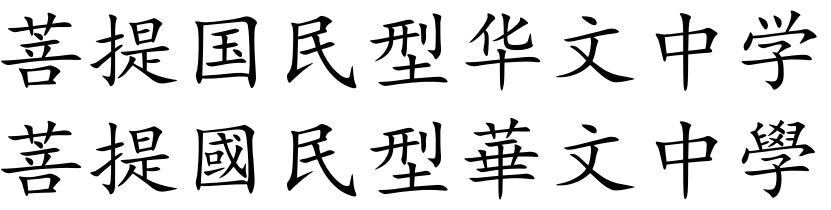
- Phor Tay National Type Chinese High School in Simplified Chinese (top) and Traditional Chinese character (bottom)
- Traditional Chinese: 菩提國民型華文中學
- Simplified Chinese: 菩提国民型华文中学
Transcriptions
Standard Mandarin
- Hanyu Pinyin: Pú Tí Guó Mín Xíng Huá Wén Zhōng Xué
Yue: Cantonese
- Jyutping: Pou4 Tai4 Gwok3 Man4 Jing4 Waa4 Man4 Zung1 Hok6
Southern Min
- Hokkien POJ: Phô͘-thê Kok-bîn-hêng Hôa-bûn Tiong-o̍h

Phor Tay High School, officially Phor Tay National Type Chinese High School (Chinese: 菩提国民型华文中学 ; Malay: Sekolah Menengah Jenis Kebangsaan Cina Phor Tay, or SMJK Phor Tay) is a National-type Chinese secondary school, located in Sungai Dua, Penang. It is the only Buddhist secondary school, where Buddhist education is a compulsory subject for all Buddhist students of the school, in Malaysia.

Phor Tay High School was previously an all-girls school. It was officially converted to a co-educational school after its relocation from Jalan Bagan Jermal in 2009.

== History ==
The school is named after Bodhi which means enlightenment in Sanskrit. It is originated from the efforts of a Buddhist nun called Hong Lien who set up the Phor Tay institute as an orphanage in 1936 She came from the province of Xiamen in China to propagate Buddhism in Penang, Malaysia. After the war, the school was rebuilt with Ong Dong Shu, who had previously taught in Yangon and Makassar becoming the school's first principal until retiring for health reasons in 1958. Philanthropist Aw Boon Haw contributed towards the building.

In 2007, the school began a transition into a co-educational institution through an application to the Ministry of Education and began to raise money to relocate to a new location for this purpose. Phor Tay High School has since moved to its present location in Sungai Dua in 2009 due to the demand for a Chinese national-type secondary schools in the south-west district of Penang island.
