= Engineering Campus, Universiti Sains Malaysia =

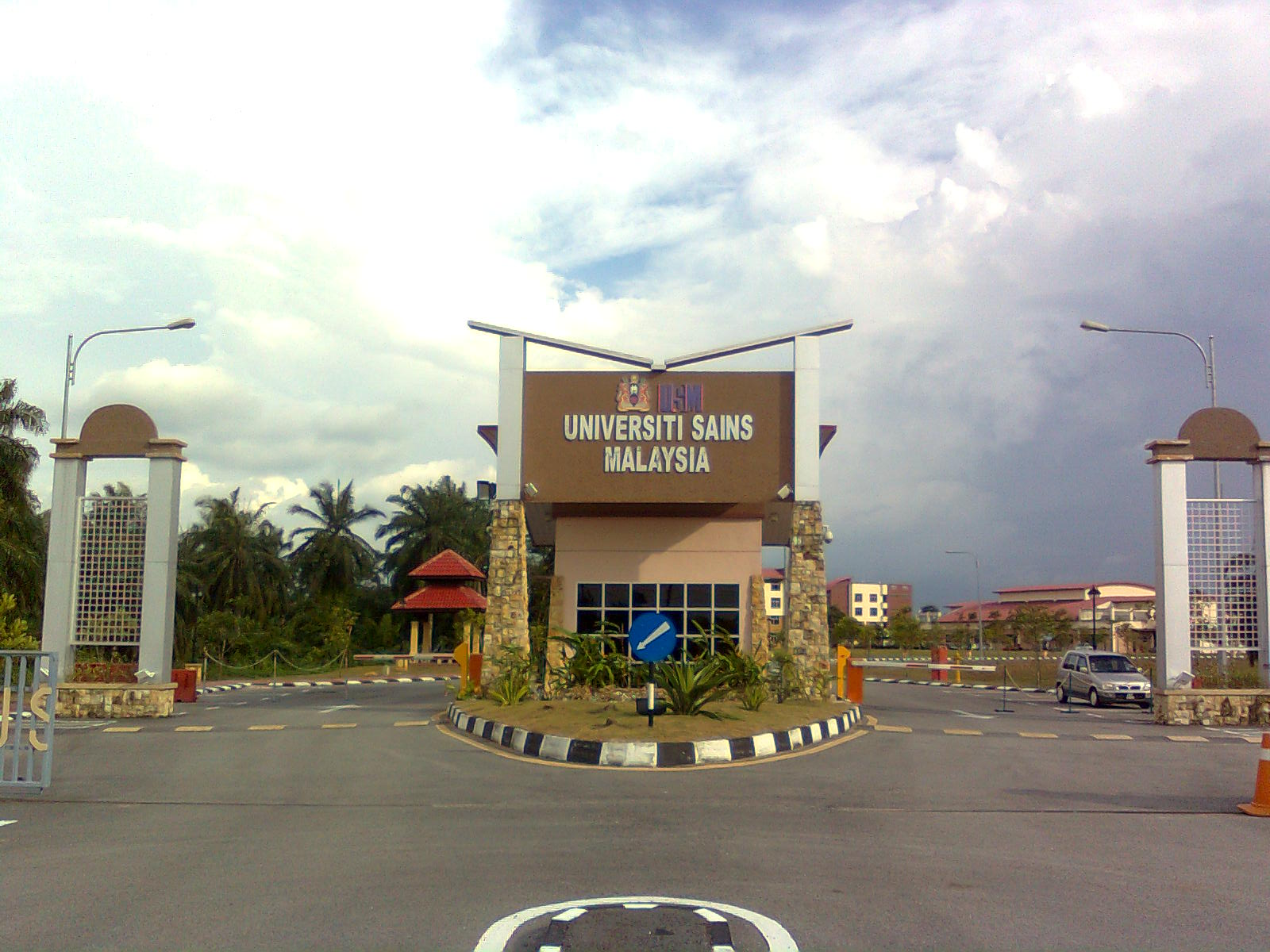
The Taman Ilmu entrance of the campus.

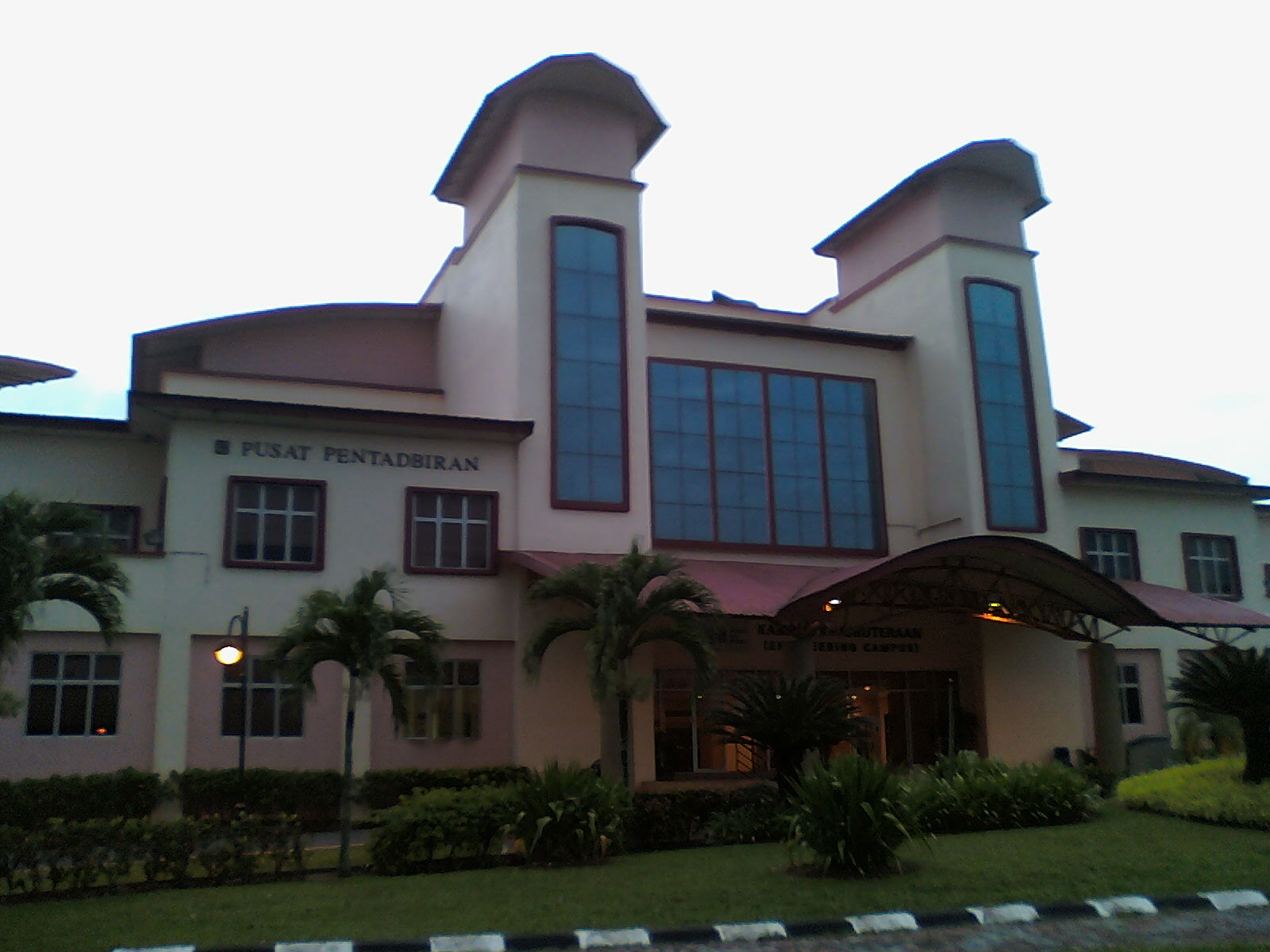
The administrative building of the campus.

The Universiti Sains Malaysia (USM) Tuanku Syed Sirajuddin Engineering Campus (Malay: Kampus Kejuruteraan Tuanku Syed Sirajuddin) is located in Transkrian, Nibong Tebal, South Seberang Perai, Penang. The campus covers an area about 320 acres. It is located approximately 45 km from the Main Campus in Gelugor, Penang. The university has produced more than 50,000 engineers since 1986.

== History ==
The initiation of this campus is aligned with USM's specific ambition, and government's general expectations to develop the studies in the engineering field in order to produce an all-rounder human capital that will be the heart and drive for the development and progress of the nation. It was started at the School of Applied Sciences, Main Campus in 1972. The era of engineering studies began at the university in 1984 when the school was restructured into two disciplines of studies and was named the School of Engineering Science and Industrial Technology. In accordance to the necessity of the development of this field of studies, encouraged USM to separate this field of study physically. Hence, the branch campus was developed to specifically cater the engineering field of studies.

Originally the campus was located in Seri Iskandar, Perak and back then the campus is known as Universiti Sains Malaysia Perak Branch Campus (Malay: Kampus Cawangan Perak, abbreviated as KCP). After operating there for 15 years (1986–2001), the campus was relocated to the present site and hence known as the Engineering Campus. The present campus area was an oil palm plantation and oil palm trees are still can be seen today at certain sections of the campus.

== Location ==
The campus is in Transkrian. It is an area at the borders of three states: Penang, Perak and Kedah. The campus is about 4 km from Nibong Tebal, 4 km from Parit Buntar, Perak and 8.3 km from Bandar Baharu, Kedah. Other institutes nearby are Arumugam Pillai Industrial Training Institute, Nibong Tebal and Transkrian MARA Junior Science College.

Location of the USM Engineering Campus in Penang

== Schools and Centres of Excellence ==
=== Schools ===
- The School of Aerospace Engineering
- The School of Civil Engineering
- The School of Chemical Engineering
- The School of Electrical & Electronic Engineering
- The School of Materials and Mineral Resources Engineering
- The School of Mechanical Engineering
- The School of Languages, Literacies & Translation

=== Research Centres ===
- REDAC – River Engineering & Urban Drainage Research Centre
- CEDEC – Collaborative μElectronic Design Excellence Centre
- Centre of Engineering Excellence
- Waste Management Cluster
- Engineering Innovation and Technology Development (EITD)

== Administrative ==
- Centre for Knowledge, Communication & Technology (PPKT)
- Registry Department
- Bursary
- Library
- Health Centre
- Development Department
- Security Department

=== Desasiswa (Residential Colleges) ===
- Desasiswa Lembaran
- Desasiswa Jaya
- Desasiswa Utama (off-campus residential college)

=== Others ===
- Division of Student Affairs & Development
- Islamic Centre
- Kelab Kebajikan & Sukan Staf Kejuruteraan(KKSSK)

== Infrastructures ==
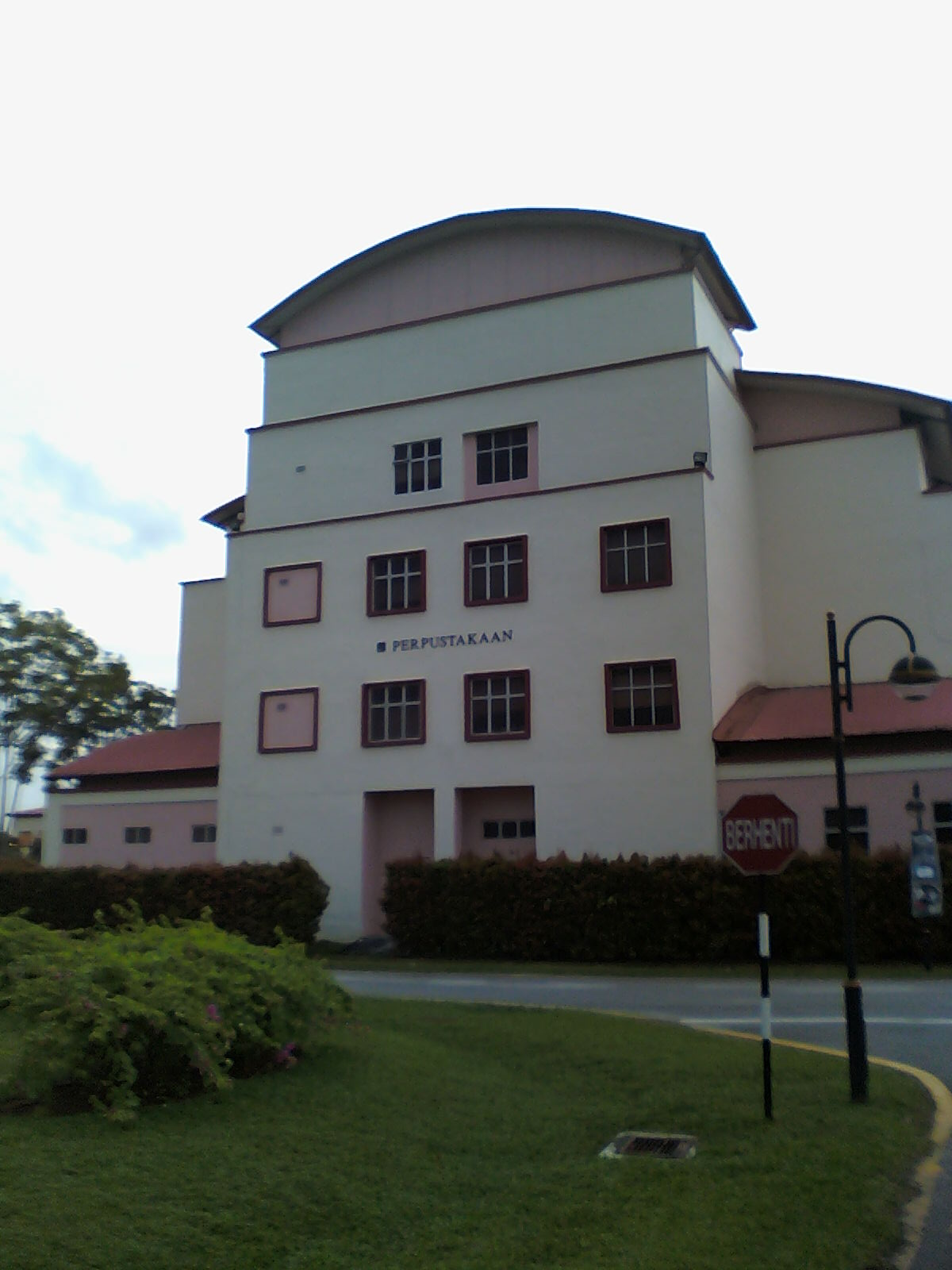
The Engineering Library.

The campus has quite a complete facilities/infrastructures to cater the needs of the students. There are a library, a main hall, Islamic Centre, 3 cafeterias, ATMs, a banquet hall, a sports complex, convenience stores, Photostat shops, a track, Pusat Mahasiswa (which houses Mahasiswa Hall, Dance Studio, etc.), an examination hall, a lecture hall complex and two hangars for the School of Aerospace Engineering. The campus also has a few lakes. Some of these lakes are meant for REDAC research. The campus provides a roofed pedestrian walk nicknamed the Susur Gajah that connects the hostel blocks and the schools.

== Ranking ==
In 2017 QS World University Ranking by Subject, two of Engineering subjects based in Universiti Sains Malaysia Engineering Campus ranked top 50 in the world.

Year	Subject	Rank
2017	Mineral and Mining	35
2017	Chemical Engineering	38
