= Prai River Bridge =

Perai River Bridge Jambatan Sungai Perai
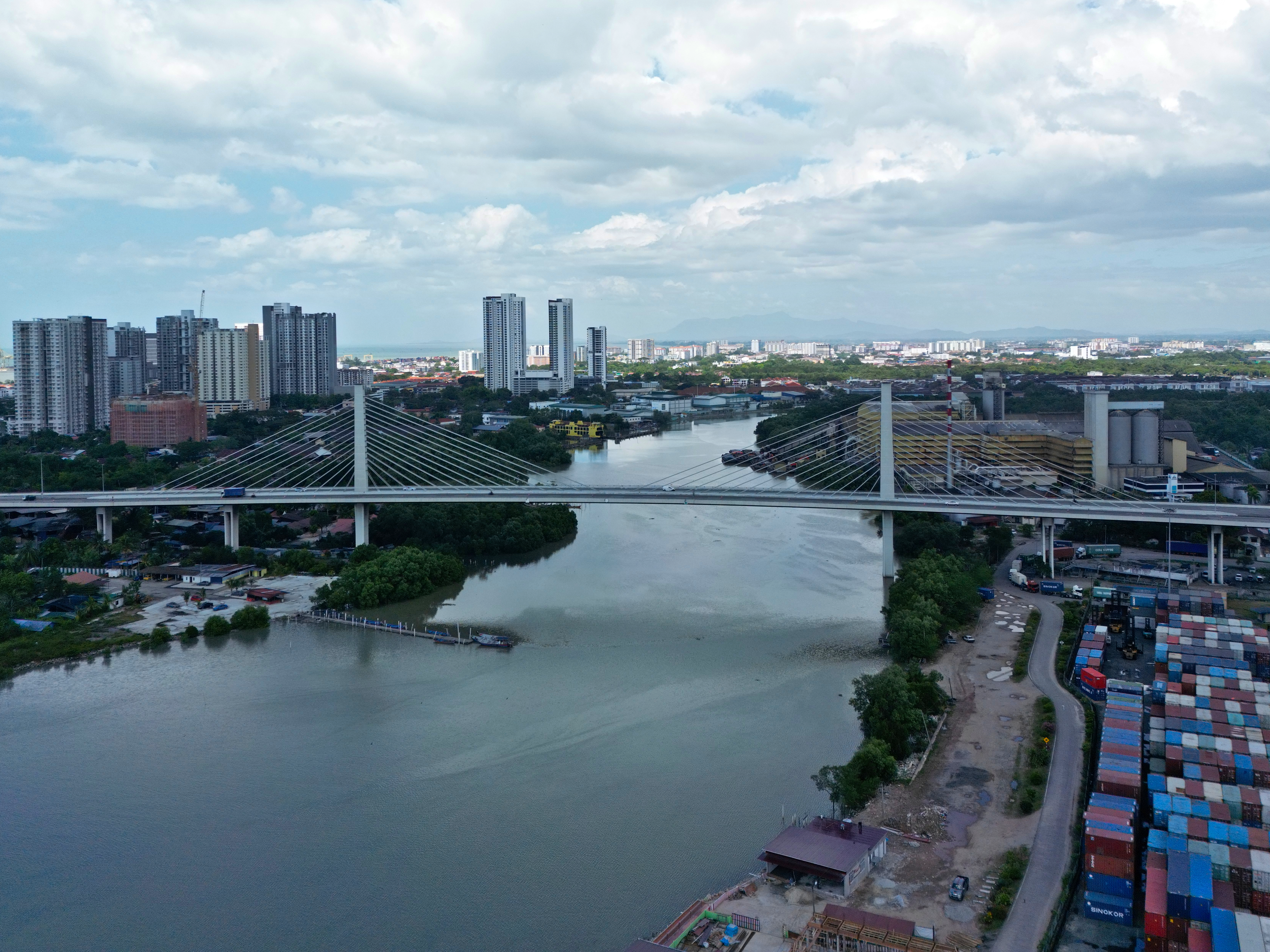
- Coordinates: 5°23′22″N 100°22′34″E
- Carries: Motor vehicles
- Crosses: Perai River, Penang
- Locale: Perai, Butterworth Outer Ring Road
- Official name: Perai River Bridge
- Maintained by: Lingkaran Luar Butterworth (Penang) Sdn. Bhd.

Characteristics
- Design: cable-stayed bridge
- Total length: 1.85 km (1.15 mi)
- Width: 27.8 m (91 ft)
- Longest span: 185 m (607 ft)

History
- Designer: Dar Al-Handasah Consultants
- Opened: 2005

Location
- Interactive map of Perai River Bridge

The Prai River Bridge is a 1.85-kilometre (1.15 mi) long dual-three lane cable-stayed bridge that straddles the Perai River in Seberang Perai, a city in the Malaysian state of Penang. It is part of the Butterworth Outer Ring Road (BORR).

Designed by Dar Al-Handasah Consultants, it won the IStructE Award for Transportation Structures and the prestigious Supreme Award in 2006. It was constructed by Lingkaran Luar Butterworth (Penang) Sdn. Bhd. under a turnkey contract.

== Project overview ==
The project was carried out by Turnkey contractor, Lingkaran Luar Butterworth (Penang) Sdn. Bhd. The main sub-contractors to the Turnkey contractor are Ballast Needam International (left halfway through the project), IJM Construction Sdn. Bhd. in joint venture with Zublin International (Malaysia) Sdn. Bhd. and consists of the following works:

- Approach viaducts consisting of twenty-two 50 m (160 ft) long precast concrete, post-tensioned, glued segmental spans constructed by the use of an overhead launching gantry.
- Two 40 m (130 ft) high, reinforced concrete (grade 80 N/mm^{2}) cable stay pylons, with each pylon accommodating 14 pairs of stay cables.
- A 185 m (607 ft) glued segmental, cable stayed main span constructed by cantilever erection method.
- Three precast segmental exit/entry ramps constructed both by the use of an overhead launching gantry and, for some spans, a heavy duty falsework support system.
- The dual three lane approaches on either side of the main bridge are 27.8 m (91 ft) wide, the width of the main bridge deck is 28.8 m (94 ft) and the ramp structures are 9.87 m (32.4 ft) wide.
- Other items in the IJM-Zublin JV contract are the supply and erection of parapets, application of anti-carbonation paint and superstructure electrical works.

== See also ==
- Penang Second Bridge
- Penang Bridge
