= Sungai Dua, Butterworth =

Sungai Dua
- Neighbourhood of Seberang Perai
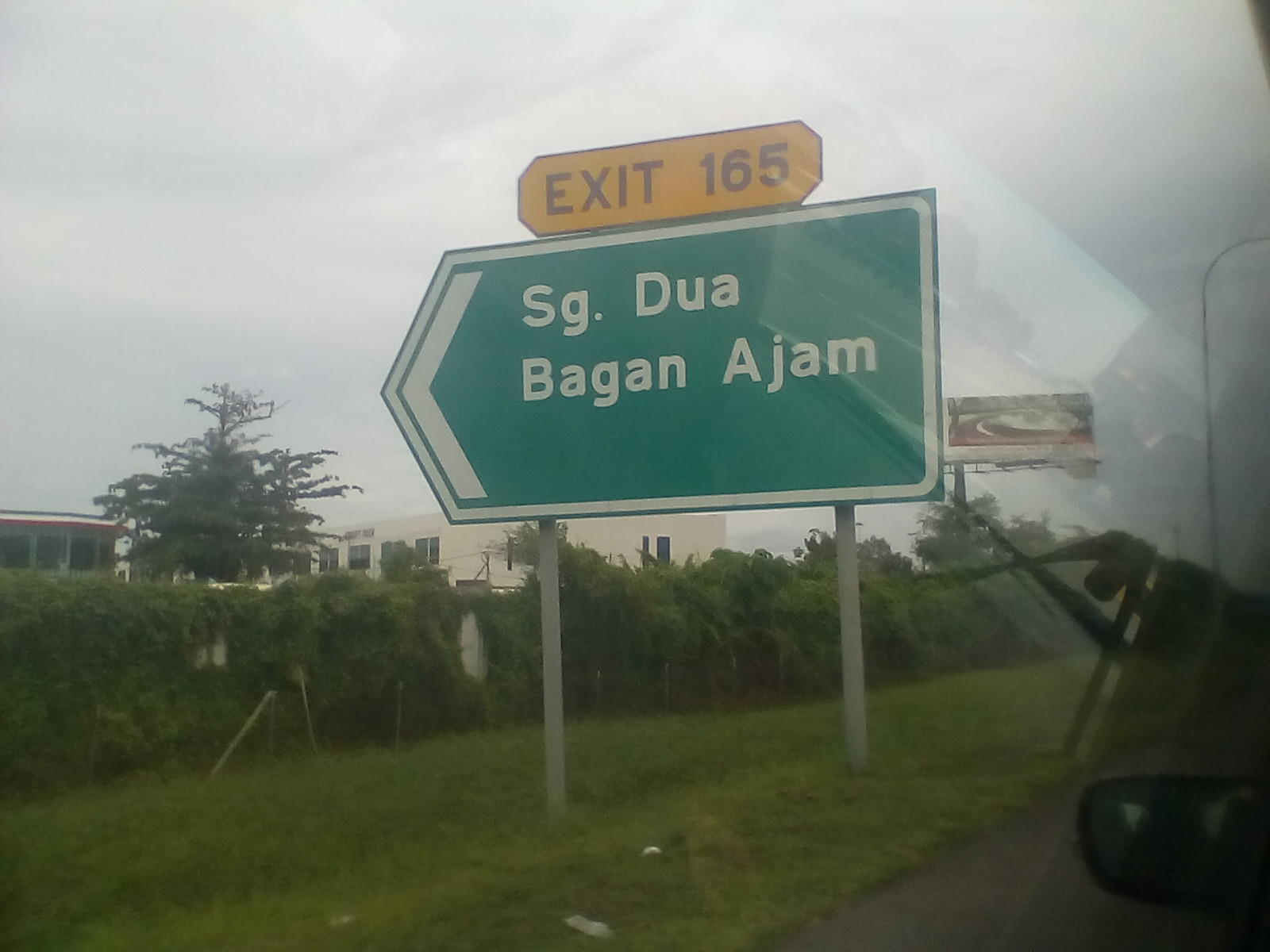
- Sungai Dua Interchange

- Location within Seberang Perai in Penang
- Coordinates: 5.4455995°N 100.4295954°E
- Country: Malaysia
- State: Penang
- City: Seberang Perai
- District: North Seberang Perai
- Time zone: UTC+8 (MST)
  - Summer (DST): Not observed

Sungai Dua is a residential neighbourhood within the city of Seberang Perai in the Malaysian state of Penang. Not to be confuse for Sungai Dua on George Town, the Sungai Dua on Butterworth is located to the north of Perai River and to the east of the North-South Expressway. This area has experienced rapid housing development.

The main road in Sungai Dua is Jalan Sungai Dua P198 which pass over the township. The exit 165 of the North-South Expressway Northern Route (Sungai Dua IC) was located near the township.

== Schools ==
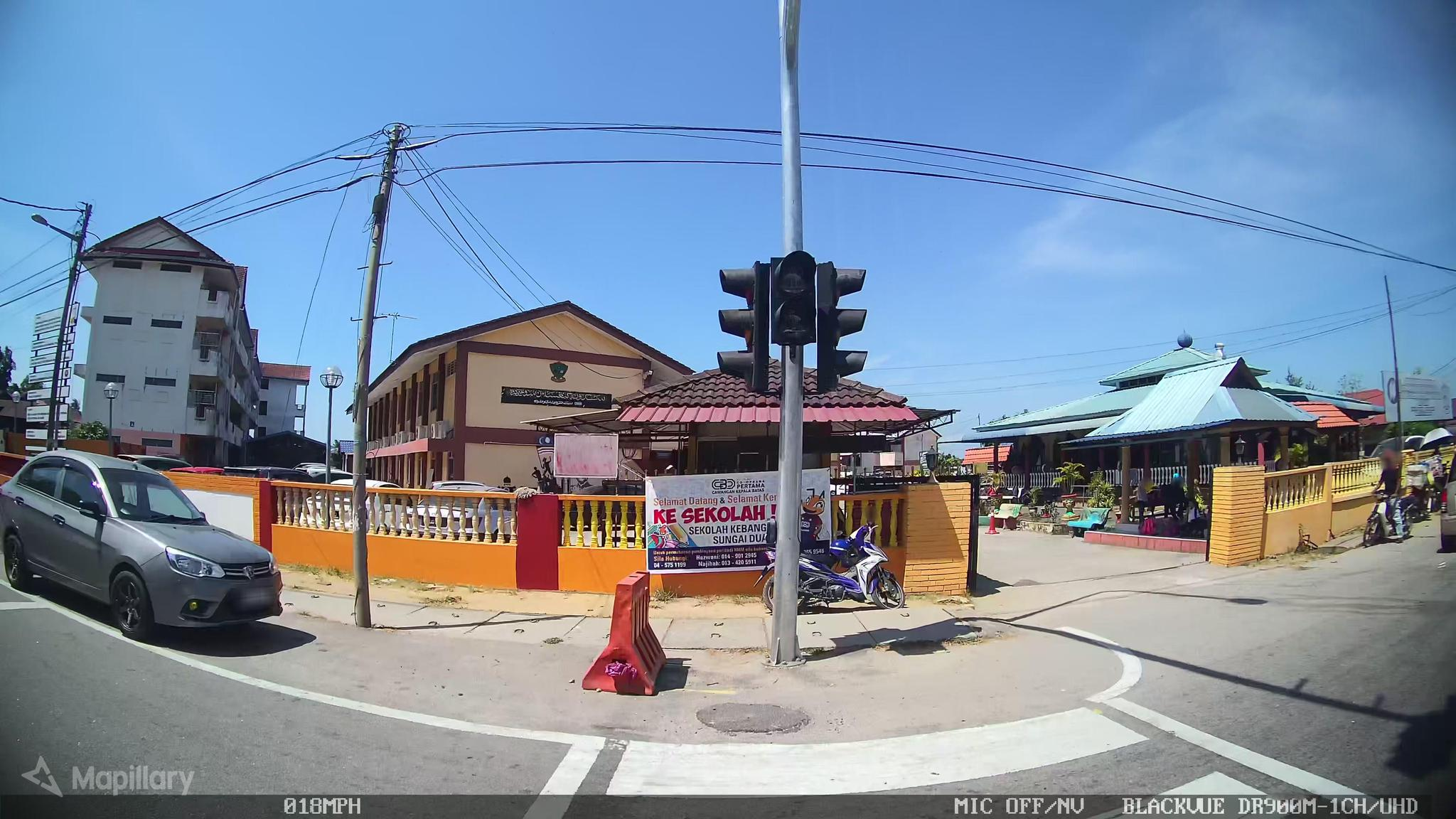
SK Sungai Dua

- SK Sungai Dua
- SRJK (C) Kai Chee
- SMK Datuk Haji Ahmad Said
- Desa Murni Sixth Form College (Kolej Tingkatan Enam Desa Murni)

== See also ==
- Butterworth, Penang
- Perai
