= Muhammad Fauzi Yusoff =

Malaysian politician

Yang Berhormat Tuan Haji Muhammad Fauzi Yusoff KMN MLA
- محمد فوزي يوسف

State Leader of the Opposition of Penang
- Incumbent
- Assumed office 17 November 2023
- Governor: Ahmad Fuzi Abdul Razak (2023-2025); Ramli Ngah Talib (since 2025)
- Chief Minister: Chow Kon Yeow
- Preceded by: Muhamad Yusoff Mohd Noor
- Constituency: Sungai Dua

Member of the Penang State Legislative Assembly for Sungai Dua
- Incumbent
- Assumed office 12 August 2023
- Preceded by: Muhamad Yusoff Mohd Noor (BN-UMNO)
- Majority: 5,509 (2023)

Personal details
- Born: Muhammad Fauzi bin Yusoff; 24 September 1971 (age 54) Penang, Malaysia
- Citizenship: Malaysian
- Party: Malaysian Islamic Party (PAS)
- Other political affiliations: Perikatan Nasional (PN)
- Spouse: Wahidatun Noor Rosli
- Children: 4
- Parent(s): Yusoff Nayan (father); Jannah Md Isa (mother)
- Occupation: Politician

Muhammad Fauzi bin Yusoff is a Malaysian politician who has served as State Leader of the Opposition of Penang since November 2023 and Member of the Penang State Legislative Assembly (MLA) for Sungai Dua since August 2023. He is a member of the Malaysian Islamic Party (PAS), a component of the Perikatan Nasional (PN) coalition.

== Politics ==
Muhammad Fauzi is the Commissioner and Chief Dewan Ulama of PAS Penang. Besides that, he is also the Chairman of PAS Balik Pulau Division.

== Election results ==
Penang State Legislative Assembly
Year	Constituency	Candidate	Votes	Pct.	Opponent(s)	Votes	Pct.	Ballots cast	Majority	Turnout
2023	N05 Sungai Dua	Muhammad Fauzi Yusoff (PAS)	13,988	62.26%	Shaik Hussein Mydin (UMNO)	8,479	37.74%	22,600	5,509	80.43%

== Honours ==
- Malaysia
  - Officer of the Order of the Defender of the Realm (KMN) (2021)
