= Minden Barracks =

- Penang, Malaysia

Site information
- Type: Barracks
- Owner: Universiti Sains Malaysia
- Condition: Re-purposed

Location
- Shown within Malaysia
- Location within Malaysia
- Coordinates: 5.357218°N 100.305473°E

Site history
- In use: 1939–71
- Battles/wars: Battle of Malaya, Malayan Emergency, Indonesia-Malaysia confrontation

Minden Barracks was a military barracks located in the south-eastern town of Gelugor in Northeast Penang Island District, Penang, Malaysia. It was operational from 1939 to 1971 and the site now houses the main campus of Universiti Sains Malaysia.

== History ==
=== Early history ===
The site of the Minden Barracks was formerly occupied by Glugor House, a plantation house of the Browns, a wealthy Scottish family who owned a nutmeg and clove plantation in the area.

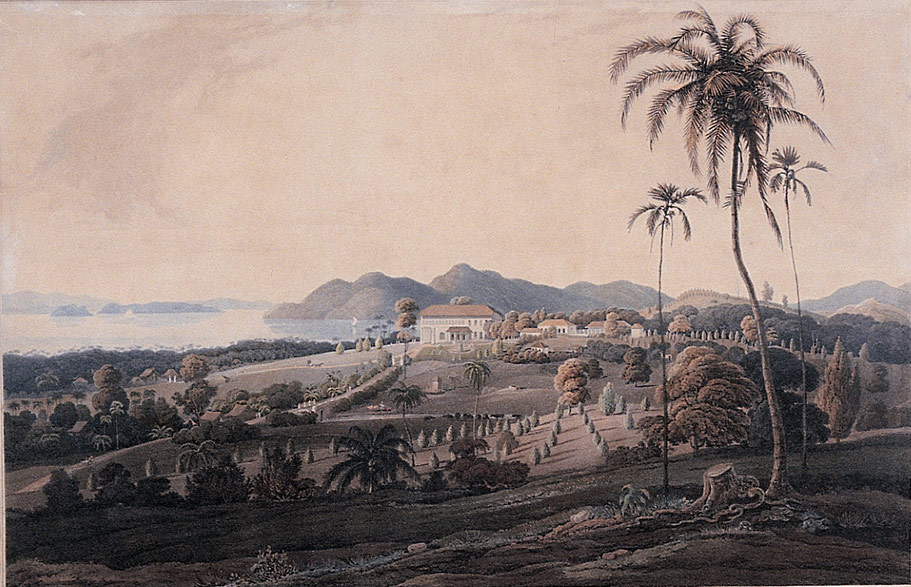
Aquatint of Glugor House in 1818

=== World War II ===
In 1939, Glugor House was converted into a barracks and renamed the Glugor Barracks and originally housed the 8th (Singapore) Heavy Battery of the Hong Kong and Singapore Royal Artillery.

The barracks was abandoned with the British withdrawal from Penang on December 17, 1941 during the Battle of Malaya of the Second World War and was occupied by the Japanese forces during the duration of the war.

=== Malayan Emergency ===
It was re-occupied by the West Yorkshire Regiment after the Surrender of Japan until 1948 when the 1st Battalion of the Kings Own Yorkshire Light Infantry was housed there during the onset of the Malayan Emergency. The barracks was renamed Minden Barracks in July 1950 in honour of the Battle of Minden, a 1759 battle of the Seven Years' War that saw the participation of 51st Regiment of Foot (the antecedent regiment of the 'KOYLIs').

In 1951, the barracks became the home of the 1st Battalion of the Manchester Regiment and in 1955 the barracks became the home of the 1st Battalion of the Royal Australian Regiment until the decommissioning of the barracks in 1971.

In 1957, the barracks was sold to the government of the newly independent Federation of Malaya for one Malayan Dollar but continued to house troops of the Overseas Commonwealth Land Forces (Malaya) including the 1st Green Jackets (43rd and 52nd) from April 1962 to December 1964 which became the 1st Battalion, Royal Green Jackets in 1966.

The barracks also housed the British Army Children's School until 1971.

=== Today ===
The barracks was de-commissioned in 1971 and the campus of Universiti Sains Malaysia was moved to the site. Today the main campus of the university remains in the same location (since renamed Minden).

== Historical units ==
This is an incomplete list of units stationed in the Minden Barracks from 1939 to 1971.

- 8th (Singapore) Heavy Battery, Hong Kong and Singapore Royal Artillery (1939–1941)

redesignated as the 11th Coastal Battery, HKSRA in March 1941

- 1st Bn, West Yorkshire Regiment (1945–1948)
- 1st Bn, Kings Own Yorkshire Light Infantry (1948–1951)
- 1st Bn, Manchester Regiment (1951–1955)
- 1st Bn, Royal Australian Regiment
- 2nd Bn, Royal Australian Regiment
- 3rd Bn, Royal Australian Regiment
- 1st Green Jackets (43rd and 52nd) (1962-1964)
- 2nd Green Jackets (KRRC)/2nd Bn Royal Green Jackets (1964-1966)
