= Taman Tun Sardon =

- Neighbourhood of George Town
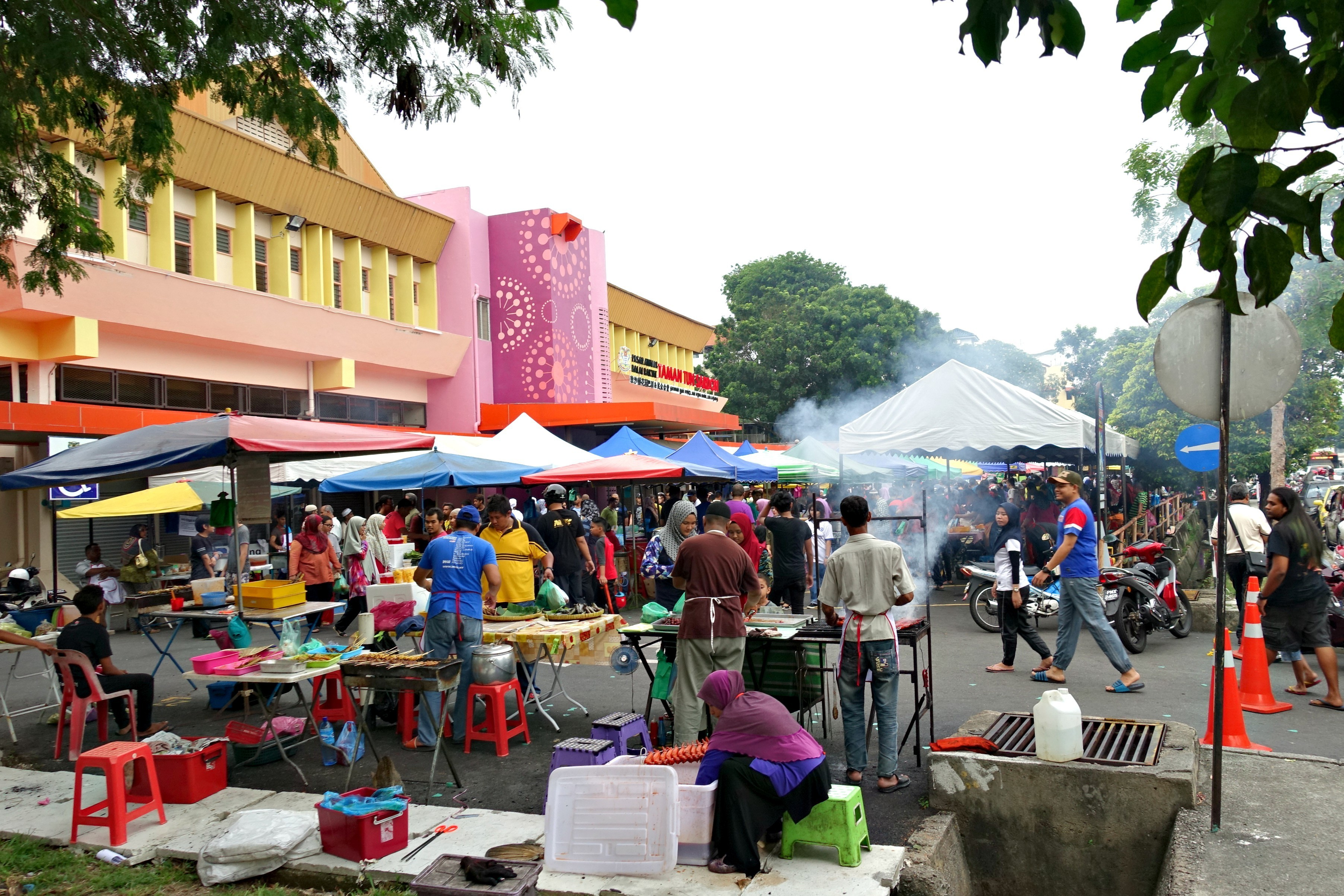
- Astaka Taman Tun Sardon

- Location within George Town in Penang
- Coordinates: 5°22′8.4828″N 100°18′21.1962″E
- Country: Malaysia
- State: Penang
- City: George Town
- District: Northeast
- Time zone: UTC+8 (MST)
  - Summer (DST): Not observed
- Postal code: 11700

Taman Tun Sardon is a residential neighbourhood within the city of George Town in the Malaysian state of Penang. Located 5.7 km (3.5 mi) south of the city centre, this working-class neighbourhood, which neighbours Minden Heights to the south and consists of low-cost five storey flats, was created in the 1980s and forms part of the Gelugor suburb. In all, 22 housing blocks were constructed within the neighbourhood to cater to the needs of lower-income citizens.

== Etymology ==
Taman Tun Sardon was named in honour of Sardon Jubir, a Johor-born politician who served as the Governor of Penang between 1975 and 1981.

== Transportation ==
Jalan Hilir Pemancar runs through Taman Tun Sardon, making it the main thoroughfare within the neighbourhood. Residents within the neighbourhood are also served by Rapid Penang bus routes 206 and 302, which include stops along the road.

== Education ==
A single high school, SMK Datuk Haji Mohd Nor Ahmad, is located within Taman Tun Sardon.

== See also ==
- Minden Heights
- Gelugor
