= Permatang Pasir =

Permatang Pasir is a village within the city of Seberang Perai in the Malaysian state of Penang. This village is located near Permatang Pauh.

== See also ==
- Permatang Pasir (state constituency)
