= Sungai Dua (state constituency) =

State constituency in Penang, Malaysia

Sungai Dua (N05)
Penang constituency

State constituency
- Legislature: Penang State Legislative Assembly
MLA
Muhammad Fauzi Yusoff
PN
- Constituency created: 1974
- First contested: 1974
- Last contested: 2023

Demographics
- Electors (2023): 28,100
- Area (km²): 35

Sungai Dua is a state constituency in Penang, Malaysia, that has been represented in the Penang State Legislative Assembly.

The state constituency was first contested in 1974 and is mandated to return a single Assemblyman to the Penang State Legislative Assembly under the first-past-the-post voting system. Since 2013, the State Assemblyman for Sungai Dua is Muhamad Yusoff Mohd Noor from Barisan Nasional (BN).

== Definition ==
=== Polling districts ===
According to the federal gazette issued on 30 March 2018, the Sungai Dua constituency is divided into 9 polling districts.

State constituency	Polling districts	Code	Location
Sungai Dua (N05)	Pajak Song	042/05/01	Maahad Al-Taqaddun Al-Watani Pajak Song
Sungai Dua (N05)	Simpang Ampat	042/05/02	Dewan JKK Simpang Empat Permatang Buluh
Sungai Dua (N05)	Permatang To'Jaya	042/05/03	SMK Permatang Tok Jaya
Sungai Dua (N05)	Alor Merah	042/05/04	Al-Irsyad Nurul Hidayah SA Rakyat Sungai Lokan
Sungai Dua (N05)	Kampong Telok	042/05/05	SK Sungai Dua
Sungai Dua (N05)	Taman Desa Murni	042/05/06	SJK (C) Kai Chee
Sungai Dua (N05)	Sungai Dua	042/05/07	SK Desa Murni
Sungai Dua (N05)	Kampong Setol	042/05/08	SK Permatang Buloh
Sungai Dua (N05)	Lahar Yooi	042/05/09	SK Lahar Yooi

== Demographics ==
Ethnic breakdown of Sungai Dua's electorate as of 2023
1. Malay (81.1%)
2. Chinese (16.0%)
3. Indian (2.39%)
4. Other ethnicities (0.46%)

Total electors by polling district in 2016
Polling district	Electors
Pajak Song	3,544
Simpang Ampat	1,450
Permatang To’Jaya	1,299
Alor Merah	1,975
Kampong Telok	3,003
Taman Desa Murni	4,603
Sungai Dua	1,265
Kampong Setol	793
Lahar Yooi	793
Total	17,932
Source: Malaysian Election Commission

== History ==
Penang State Legislative Assemblyman for Sungai Dua
Assembly	No	Years	Member	Party
Constituency created from Tasek Glugor and Kepala Batas
4th	N07	1974–1978	Zabidi Ali	BN (PAS)
5th	N07	1978–1982	Zabidi Ali	PAS
6th	N07	1982–1986	Mohd Shariff Omar	BN (UMNO)
7th	N05	1986–1990	Mohd Shariff Omar	BN (UMNO)
8th	N05	1990–1995	Mohammed Yusof Abdul Latib @ Latiff	BN (UMNO)
9th	N05	1995–1999	Jasmin Mohamed	BN (UMNO)
10th	N05	1999–2004	Jasmin Mohamed	BN (UMNO)
11th	N05	2004–2008	Jasmin Mohamed	BN (UMNO)
12th	N05	2008–2013	Jasmin Mohamed	BN (UMNO)
13th	N05	2013–2018	Muhamad Yusoff Mohd Noor	BN (UMNO)
14th	N05	2018–2023	Muhamad Yusoff Mohd Noor	BN (UMNO)
15th	N05	2023–present	Muhammad Fauzi Yusoff	PN (PAS)

== Election results ==
Penang state election, 2023
Party	Candidate	Votes	%	∆%
PN	Muhammad Fauzi Yusoff	13,988	62.26	▲32.06
BN	Shaik Hussein Mydin	8,479	37.74	▼3.36
Total valid votes		22,467	100.00	
Total rejected ballots		83		
Unreturned ballots		50		
Turnout		22,600	80.43	▼7.47
Registered electors		28,100		
Majority		5,509	24.52	▲13.62
PN gain from BN		Swing		?

Penang state election, 2018
Party	Candidate	Votes	%	∆%
BN	Muhamad Yusoff Mohd Noor	7,314	41.10	▼8.90
PAS	Zahadi Hj. Mohd	5,380	30.20	▼17.6
PKR	Yusri Isahak	5,115	28.70	▲28.70
Total valid votes		17,809	100.0	
Total rejected ballots		207		
Unreturned ballots		50		
Turnout		18,066	87.90	▼2.10
Registered electors		20,558		
Majority		2,203	10.90	▲8.70
BN hold		Swing		
Source(s) "His Majesty's Government Gazette - Notice of Contested Election, State Legislative Assembly for the State of Penang [P.U. (B) 252/2018]" (PDF). Attorney General's Chambers of Malaysia. 3 May 2018. "Federal Government Gazette - Results of Contested Election and Statements of the Poll after the Official Addition of Votes, State Constituencies for the State of Penang [P.U. (B) 326/2018]" (PDF). Attorney General's Chambers of Malaysia. 28 May 2018.

Penang state election, 2013
Party	Candidate	Votes	%	∆%
BN	Muhamad Yusoff Mohd Noor	7,951	50.00	▼2.20
PAS	Zahadi Haji Mohammad	7,594	47.80	—
Independent	Mohammad Sharifin Omar	344	2.20	▲2.20
Total valid votes		15,889	100.00	
Total rejected ballots		200		
Unreturned ballots		0		
Turnout		16,089	90.00	▲5.20
Registered electors		17,871		
Majority		357	2.20	▼2.20
BN hold		Swing		
Source(s) "Federal Government Gazette - Notice of Contested Election, State Legislative Assembly for the State of Penang [P.U. (B) 189/2013]" (PDF). Attorney General's Chambers of Malaysia. 26 April 2013. "Federal Government Gazette - Results of Contested Election and Statements of the Poll after the Official Addition of Votes, State Constituencies for the State of Penang [P.U. (B) 230/2013]" (PDF). Attorney General's Chambers of Malaysia. 22 May 2013.

Penang state election, 2008
Party	Candidate	Votes	%	∆%
BN	Jasmin Mohamed	6,421	52.20	▼8.60
PAS	Mohammad Salleh Man	5,886	47.80	▲8.60
Total valid votes		12,307	100.00	
Total rejected ballots		164		
Unreturned ballots		14		
Turnout		12,485	84.80	▼0.07
Registered electors		14,721		
Majority		535	4.40	▼17.20
BN hold		Swing		

Penang state election, 2004
Party	Candidate	Votes	%	∆%
BN	Jasmin Mohamed	7,183	60.80	▲5.58
PAS	Soid Mohd Amin	4,631	39.20	▼5.58
Total valid votes		11,814	100.00	
Total rejected ballots		140		
Unreturned ballots		1		
Turnout		11,955	84.87	▲3.75
Registered electors		14,087		
Majority		2,552	21.60	▲11.16
BN hold		Swing		

Penang state election, 1999
Party	Candidate	Votes	%	∆%
BN	Jasmin Mohamed	5,355	55.22	▼18.20
PAS	Soid Mohd Amin	4,613	44.78	▲18.20
Total valid votes		9,968	100.00	
Total rejected ballots		228		
Unreturned ballots		6		
Turnout		10,202	81.12	▲1.84
Registered electors		12,577		
Majority		742	10.44	▼36.40
BN hold		Swing		

Penang state election, 1995
Party	Candidate	Votes	%	∆%
BN	Jasmin Mohamed	6,695	73.42	▲0.97
PAS	Khalid B. Man	2,424	26.58	▼0.97
Total valid votes		9,119	100.00	
Total rejected ballots		256		
Unreturned ballots		8		
Turnout		9,383	79.28	▼1.15
Registered electors		11,836		
Majority		4,271	46.84	▲1.84
BN hold		Swing		

Penang state election, 1990
Party	Candidate	Votes	%	∆%
BN	Mohammed Yusof Abdul Latib	6,379	72.45	▲0.62
PAS	Mohammad Salleh Man	2,425	27.45	▼0.62
Total valid votes		8,804	100.00	
Total rejected ballots		278		
Unreturned ballots		0		
Turnout		9,082	80.43	▲3.98
Registered electors		11,292		
Majority		3,954	45.00	▲1.34
BN hold		Swing		

Penang state election, 1986
Party	Candidate	Votes	%	∆%
BN	Mohd Shariff Omar	5,922	71.83	▲1.21
PAS	Mohd Salleh	2,323	28.17	▼1.21
Total valid votes		8,245	100.00	
Total rejected ballots		249		
Unreturned ballots		0		
Turnout		8,494	76.45	▲1.18
Registered electors		11,111		
Majority		3,599	43.66	▲2.42
BN hold		Swing		

Penang state election, 1982
Party	Candidate	Votes	%	∆%
BN	Mohd Shariff Omar	5,379	70.62	▲25.28
PAS	Zabidi Ali	2,238	29.38	▼25.28
Total valid votes		7,617	100.00	
Total rejected ballots		342		
Unreturned ballots		0		
Turnout		7,764	75.27	▼6.29
Registered electors		9,577		
Majority		3,599	41.24	▲31.92
BN gain from PAS		Swing		?

Penang state election, 1978
Party	Candidate	Votes	%	∆%
PAS	Zabidi Ali	3,543	54.66	▲54.66
BN	Hindon Hashim	2,839	45.34	▼28.14
Total valid votes		6,483	100.00	
Total rejected ballots		353		
Unreturned ballots		0		
Turnout		6,735	81.56	▲1.86
Registered electors		8,258		
Majority		704	9.32	▼49.89
PAS gain from BN		Swing		?

Penang state election, 1974
Party	Candidate	Votes	%
BN	Zabidi Ali	3,893	73.48
PEKEMAS	Samsiah Abbas	756	14.27
Parti Sosialis Rakyat Malaysia	Mat Saad Ahmad	649	12.25
Total valid votes		5,298	100.00
Total rejected ballots		257	
Unreturned ballots		0	
Turnout		5,555	79.70
Registered electors		6,967	
Majority		3,137	59.21
This was a new constituency created.
