= Bagan Lalang =

Beach in Selangor, Malaysia

- Beach
- Bagan Lalang beach

- Location within Malaysia
- Coordinates: 2.5998°N 101.689°E
- Location: Sepang District, Selangor, Malaysia
- Water bodies: Malacca Strait

Bagan Lalang is a coastal beach in Sepang District, Selangor, Malaysia. It is close to the border with Negeri Sembilan's Port Dickson District. A popular picnic and camping spot on weekends, housing and tourism developments around the area have been rapid in the past decade due to its proximity to the Kuala Lumpur International Airport and the Sepang International Circuit.
