= Sungai Dua =

- Neighbourhood of George Town
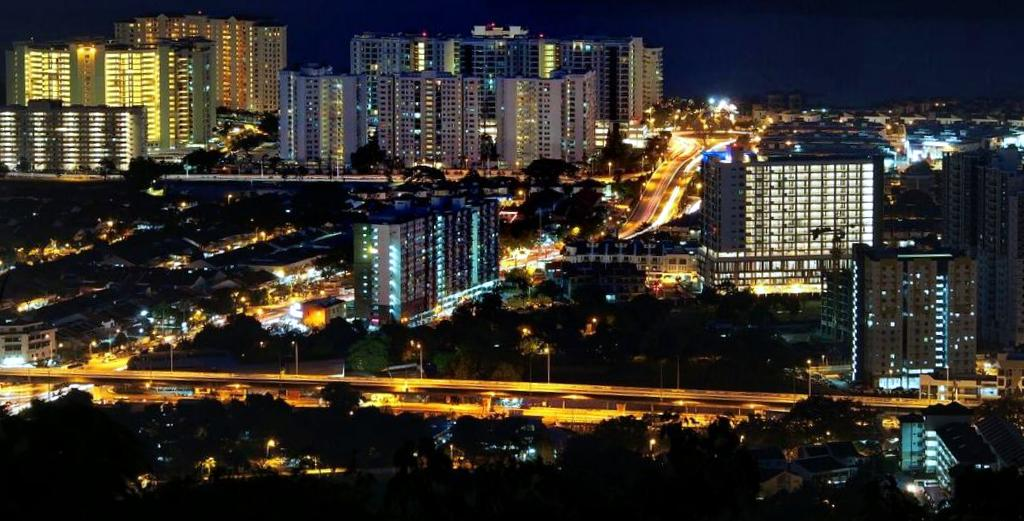

- Location within George Town in Penang
- Coordinates: 5°20′38.295″N 100°17′45.5742″E
- Country: Malaysia
- State: Penang
- City: George Town
- District: Northeast
- Time zone: UTC+8 (MST)
  - Summer (DST): Not observed
- Postal code: 11700

Sungai Dua is a residential neighbourhood within the city of George Town in the Malaysian state of Penang. Located 8.7 km (5.4 mi) south of the city centre, this neighbourhood borders Universiti Sains Malaysia to the north, Sungai Nibong to the east and Bukit Jambul to the west.

== Etymology ==
Sungai Dua is named after an eponymous river, Sungai Dua, which runs through the area.

== History ==
Formerly an agricultural area, Sungai Dua was first developed as a residential neighbourhood in the 1970s, following the establishment of the adjacent Universiti Sains Malaysia. Beginning in the 1980s, high-rises, such as apartments and flats, were constructed within the neighbourhood to cater to the influx of university students.

== Transportation ==
Jalan Sungai Dua is the main thoroughfare within the neighbourhood, which is also served by Rapid Penang bus routes 301, 303, 304 and 308.

== Education ==
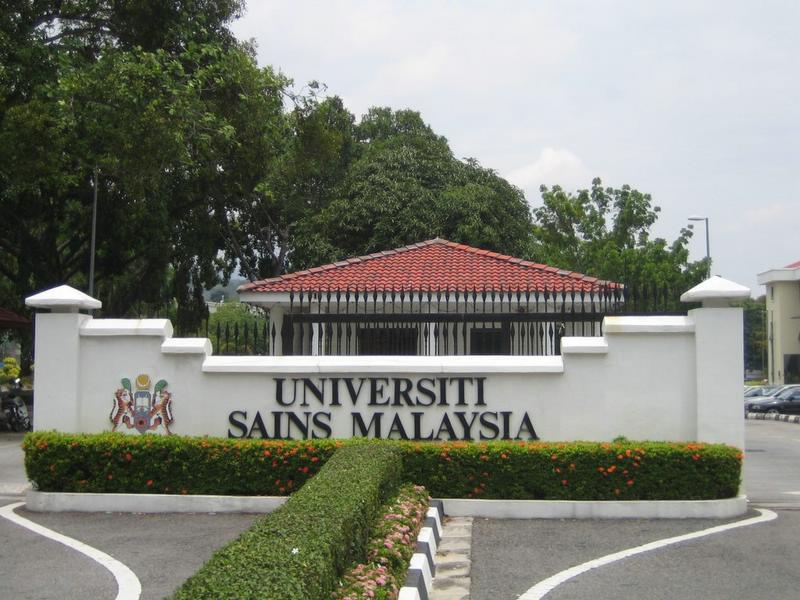
The main campus of Universiti Sains Malaysia is situated north of Sungai Dua.

Universiti Sains Malaysia (USM), Penang's premier public university, is situated immediately north of Sungai Dua. One of the top Malaysian public universities, USM was ranked fifth within the country by the QS World University Rankings as of 2016.

In addition, a primary school and a high school are situated within Sungai Dua. Notably, Phor Tay High School, which is situated in the area, is the sole public Buddhist school in Malaysia.

Primary school

- SRJK (C) Keong Hoe

High school

- Phor Tay High School

== Shopping ==
A Lotus's hypermarket within the neighbourhood was completed in the late 2000s to cater to the retail needs of the community. In addition, Suiwah Corporation, a local retail firm, operates the Sunshine Lip Sin supermarket within the area.

== Neighbourhoods ==
- Taman Lip Sin
- Taman Pekaka

== See also ==
- Minden Heights
- Gelugor
