= Universiti Sains Malaysia =

Public research university in Malaysia

Coordinates: 5°21′25″N 100°18′05″E

- اونيۏرسيتي ساءينﺱ مليسيا (Jawi)
- Coat of arms
- Motto: Kami Memimpin (Malay)
- Motto in English: We Lead
- Type: Public research university
- Established: 1 June 1969; 57 years ago
- Affiliations: ASAIHL, ACU, FUIW, APUCEN, UAiTED
- Chancellor: Tuanku Syed Sirajuddin Putra Jamalullail (Raja of Perlis)
- Vice-Chancellor: Professor Dato' Seri Ir. Dr. Abdul Rahman Mohamed (FASc)
- Faculty: 2,206
- Students: 24,375 (2016)
- Undergraduates: 17,306 (2016)
- Postgraduates: 7,069 (2016)
- Location: Level 1, Building E42, Chancellory II Universiti Sains Malaysia 11800 USM Penang, Malaysia, Penang, Malaysia
- Campus: Main Campus (Gelugor, Penang) Health Campus (Kubang Kerian, Kelantan) Engineering Campus (Nibong Tebal, Penang) Advanced Medical and Dental Institute (Kepala Batas, Penang) IPS Sains@KL (Kuala Lumpur) International Medical Programme Campus (Belgaum, India)
- Colours: Purple and orange
- Website: www.usm.my

Universiti Sains Malaysia (Malay for 'Malaysia Science University', abbreviated as USM) is a public research university in Malaysia. Founded on 1 June 1969 as a statutory body with its own constitution, it is the oldest institute of higher learning in Northern Malaysia, as well as the second oldest in the country. It has six campuses: a main campus on the island of Penang, a health campus in Kelantan, an engineering campus in Nibong Tebal, an Advanced Medical and Dental Institute in Kepala Batas, Seberang Perai, a postgraduate studies campus in Kuala Lumpur and an offshore International Medical Programme Campus in Belgaum, India in collaboration with KLE University.

USM is the only Accelerated Programs for Excellence (APEX) government-funded autonomous university in Malaysia. Like most of other universities in Malaysia, USM also used English as its medium of instruction.

== History ==
=== Early concept and establishment ===
The idea of a university in Penang was first mooted by D. S. Ramanathan in 1959 in the State Assembly and later crystallised when he was nominated chairman of the Penang University Project committee. The acquisition of a piece of land in Sungai Ara was then followed by the ceremonial laying of the foundation stone by Prime Minister Tunku Abdul Rahman on 7 August 1967.

In June 1968, the Federal Government commissioned a committee led by Mohamed Suffian to draft a Constitution for the new university. The committee then issued a report recommended that the university be autonomous and separate from the government and supported academic freedom in relation to the society and the Government.

USM was established as a statutory body and the second university in Malaysia in 1969. It was first known as the Penang Island University (Malay: Universiti Pulau Pinang). The university operated on borrowed premises at the Malayan Teachers' Training College at Gelugor, with only 57 science-based students in the beginning. At that time, there were only three schools of Biological Sciences, Chemical Sciences and Physics and Mathematics. A year later, three non-science schools of Cultural Studies and Humanities, Educational Studies and Social Sciences were established.

=== Campus relocation and expansion ===
In 1971, it moved to its present 239-hectare site at Minden (formerly Minden Barracks of the British Far East Command) in Gelugor, 10 kilometres from the city of Georgetown. In 1972, two new schools of Pharmaceutical Sciences (first of its kind in Malaysia) and the Building Sciences and Architecture (a year later renamed School of Housing, Building and Planning) were established. The same year, USM's publication arm – Penerbit USM was established under its Department of Library. In 1973, the School of Applied Sciences was established (later renamed School of Engineering Sciences and Industrial Technology on 7 August 1984), followed by School of Mathematical Sciences in May 1974 (split from School of Physics and later renamed School of Mathematics and Computer Sciences in 1985) and School of Medical Sciences in 1979.

=== New branch campuses ===
In 1983, a health campus was opened in Kubang Kerian, Kelantan, housing a training hospital in the beginning for fourth year medical students. The School of Medical Sciences moved there in stages, and became fully operational there in June 1990. Two more schools of Dental and Health Sciences were established on 1 December 1998 and 1 November 1999 respectively.

Realising the need for degree recognition by factories in the engineering field especially those in Penang and Kuala Lumpur, an Engineering Campus was established in 1986, first by occupying rental buildings in Ipoh, Perak. At the same time, the School of Engineering Sciences and Industrial Technology was split into the School of Industry Technology which remain at the main campus and the School of Electrical and Electronic Engineering and the School of Materials and Mineral Resources Engineering which were relocated to the Engineering Campus, then also known as Perak Branch Campus (Malay: Kampus Cawangan Perak). Two more schools were established there in 1989 – The schools of Civil Engineering and Mechanical Engineering. December that same year, the Engineering Campus moved to its permanent site in Teronoh, 30 kilometres away from the state's capital and was officially opened by Sultan Azlan Shah on 13 September 1990.

The School of Chemical Engineering was established on 1 May 1992, and the School of Aerospace Engineering was established on 1 March 1999 through upgrading the campus' Aerospace Engineering Unit. In 1997, the Ministry of Education decided to transfer the engineering campus back to Penang to help fulfill the state's growing human resources needs in its Electrical and Electronics Sector. Thus, a new location in Seri Ampangan, Nibong Tebal was identified for the campus and it began operations there in June 2001, while its former site was taken over by Universiti Teknologi Petronas, a private university owned by Malaysian oil and gas multinational corporation Petronas.

Meanwhile, in the main campus, the School of Management was established on 1 December 1989, while the Institute of Postgraduate Studies (IPS) was established in 1991 to meet the needs of rising number of candidates in higher degree programmes. The School of Communication was established in 1993, and on 1 March 1995, the School of Computer Sciences was split from the School of Mathematical Sciences as a separate School. Towards the end of the 20th century, the School of Distance Education and the School of the Arts were established in 1998 and 1999 respectively. On 15 March 1998, USM became the second university in Malaysia to be corporatised after University of Malaya. USAINS Holding Sdn Bhd, USM's corporate arm was later established on 21 October 1999 to leverage the available skills for income-generating business development, replacing its Innovation and Consultancy Centre.

USM's first off-campus site Centre for Marine and Coastal Studies (CEMACS) was established in August 1991 at Teluk Aling in Penang National Park for research and post-graduate training in the Marine Science and Coastal Ecosystems fields.

=== APEX Status and International Collaboration ===
On 16 February 2002, The Advanced Medical and Dental Institute (Malay: Institut Perubatan dan Pergigian Termaju, AMDI or IPPT) was established in Bertam, Kepala Batas, Seberang Perai, Penang as institute for advanced research and postgraduate programmes in the medical fields.

In June 2008, the Science and Arts Innovation Space (also known as sains@USM) was launched in Bukit Jambul to strengthen innovation and retain the best talents in the science and arts fields, while attracting international collaborators to boost the country's knowledge economy. It was constructed on 12.4ha plot of land located few kilometres away from the main campus that was bought from IJM Corporation in March that year for RM59 million.

On 3 September 2008, the Ministry of Higher Education under Mohamed Khaled Nordin selected USM to implement the Accelerated Programme for Excellence (APEX), a fast-track development programme created to enable institutions of higher education to be recognised as world-class entities. School of Languages, Literacies and Translation was established on 19 November 2008 by upgrading the Language Unit of the School of Education, while the Graduate School of Business was established in 2009. In 2010, an international offshore medical campus in collaboration with KLE University was established in the college's compound in Belgaum, India.

On 1 November 2013, Sains@KL (known as USM@KL since 16 November 2022) was established in Kuala Lumpur as an institute to offer high impact academic postgraduate programmes. On 9 October 2023, USM@KL moved from its original location in Wisma Sejarah, Jalan Tun Razak, to a new office at MoF Inc Tower, Platinum Park.

== Coat of arms ==
The coat of arms of USM was first introduced in June 1972 and modernised in 2009. Its initial draft was designed by York Heralds of Arms in London, before being perfected by an artist and Penang Free School (PFS) teacher, Mr. G.S. Reutens.

The arms of the university is displayed on a native shield, and contains much local symbolism, but generally conform to traditional English heraldic principles and may be blazoned as follows.

Shield: Purpure in chief two krises in saltire surmounted by an open book and in base a Bunga Raya (hibiscus flower) all proper.

Crest: On a wreath of the colours a crescent therefrom issuant a fourteen-pointed federal star Or.

Supporters: On either side a tiger holding in the interior forepaw a palm frond proper.

Motto: "Kami Memimpin" (Malay: "We Lead")

Since 25 January 2003, the USM coat of arms has been accompanied by the university's logotype designed by Anthony Tan Chee Kian, featuring the initials U, S and M attached to one another and the university's name in full written in all caps –'UNIVERSITI SAINS MALAYSIA' as seen on its corporate logo.

USM is currently one of the three public universities in Malaysia to adopt its coat of arms, the other two are the University of Malaya (UM) and The National University of Malaysia (UKM).

== List of vice-chancellors ==
The following is a list of vice-chancellors of USM.

No.	Vice-Chancellor	Academic Qualification	Honorable & Awards Received	Term in office
1	Hamzah Sendut	Bachelor of Arts in Geography (Malaya), Master of Civil Design (Liverpool), PhD in Science (Tokyo).	PSM, DSPN, Hon. Doc. (Strathclyde), Hon. Doc. (Kyung Hee), Hon Doc. (USM)	1969–1976
2	Hamdan Sheikh Tahir	Bachelor of Arts in History (Malaya), Master of Social Science (Nottingham).	SMN, PSM, DMPN, KMN, Hon. Doc. (USM), Hon. Doc. (UPM)	1976–1982
3	Musa Mohamad	Bachelor of Science in Pharmacy (Singapore), Master of Science in Pharmaceutical Technology(London).	PSM, DSPN, Hon. Doc. (USM), Hon. Doc. (UMS), Hon. Doc. (UNIMAP), Hon. Doc. (UTHM), Hon. Doc. (UMT), Hon. Doc. (UCSI).	1982–1995
4	Ishak Tambi Kechik			1995–2000
5	Dzulkifli Abdul Razak	Bachelor of Pharmacy (USM), Master of Science in Pharmacology (Strathclyde).	PSM, DPMS, DMPN, DPMP. Hon. Doc. Sci. (Portsmouth), Hon. Doc. Sci. (Nottingham), Hon. Doc. Ed. Sci. (Istanbul), Hon. Doc. Sci. (Mykolas Romeris, Lithuania), Hon. Doc. Dakwah and Islamic Management (USIM), Hon. Doc. Leadership in Ed. (Cyberjaya), professor emeritus (USM). Tokoh Akademik Negara (National Academic Laureate)	2000–2011
6	Omar Osman	Bachelor of Science in Quantity Surveying (USM), Master of Science in Construction Management (Heriot-Watt), PhD in Project Management (London).	DSPJ.	2011–2016
7	Asma Ismail	Bachelor of Science in Biology (Nevada), Master of Science in Microbiology (Indiana), PhD in Cellular and Molecular Biology (Nevada).	PJN, Hon. Doc. (Glasgow), Hon. Doc. (Keele), Hon. Doc. (Kyoto).	2016–2019
8	Faisal Rafiq Mahamd Adikan	Bachelor of Electrical & Electronical Engineering (Manchester), Master of Engineering (Malaya), PhD in Integrated Optical Devices (Southampton).	DMPN	2019–2022
9	Abdul Rahman Mohamed	Bachelor of Science in Chemical Engineering (Southern California), Master of Science in Chemical Engineering (New Hampshire), PhD in Chemical Engineering (New Hampshire).	D.S.P.J., J.M.N., B.C.N., FASc., CEng., FIChemE, P.Eng	2023–Present

== Organisation ==
=== Chief Integrity Officer ===
In July 2012, following a presentation by the Chief of Malaysian Anti-Corruption Commission, the VC of USM promised to create a new role of Chief Integrity Officer to cultivate academic integrity among students, lecturers, and staff. The current Chief Integrity Officer is Dr. Khairul Anuar Che Azmi, the university's first ombudsman, and is also the Legal Advisor.

== Campuses ==
Location of the main campus in Penang

The Main campus has the name of a German city (Minden) because the campus was built on the territory of the former British Minden Barracks, which themselves were named after the Battle of Minden.

Besides the main campus in Minden, USM has one at Kubang Kerian in Kelantan known as Health Campus, and another at Seri Ampangan, Nibong Tebal in mainland Penang known as Engineering Campus.

Started as a USM hospital in 1982, the Health campus has expanded after the School of Medical Science was moved from the main campus to the present site which is 73 hectares. The School of Medical Science was moved from the main campus in June 1984. There are two other schools on the health campus — the School of Dental Science and the School of Allied Health Sciences.

The Engineering Campus was originally located at Tronoh, Perak, and named Perak Branch Campus (KCP). After operating in the state for 15 years (1986–2001), the Engineering Campus moved to the present site in Nibong Tebal, Penang.

Other campuses of USM include:

- Advanced Medical and Dental Institute (AMDI) in Bertam, Kepala Batas, Seberang Perai
- IPS Sains@USM in Kuala Lumpur
- USM-KLE International Campus in Belgaum, Karnataka, India in collaboration with Karnatak Lingayat Education Society

Each of the six campuses of USM have their own library and accommodations among other facilities.

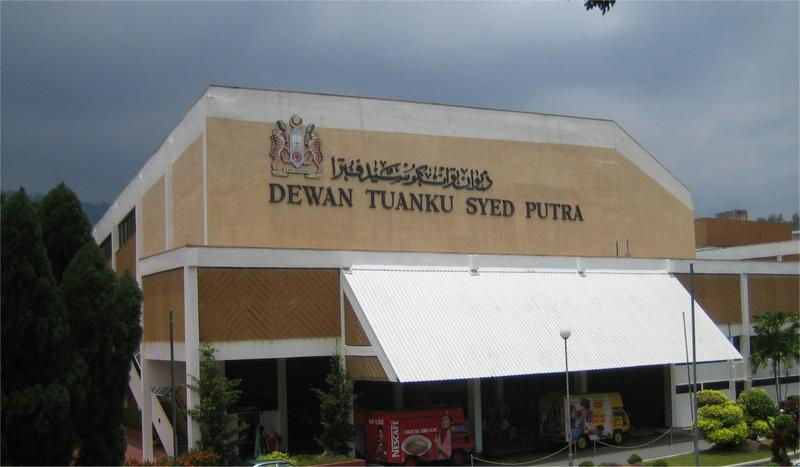
Dewan Tuanku Syed Putra: The main auditorium of USM on the main campus on Penang Island (picture taken on 23 March 2006)

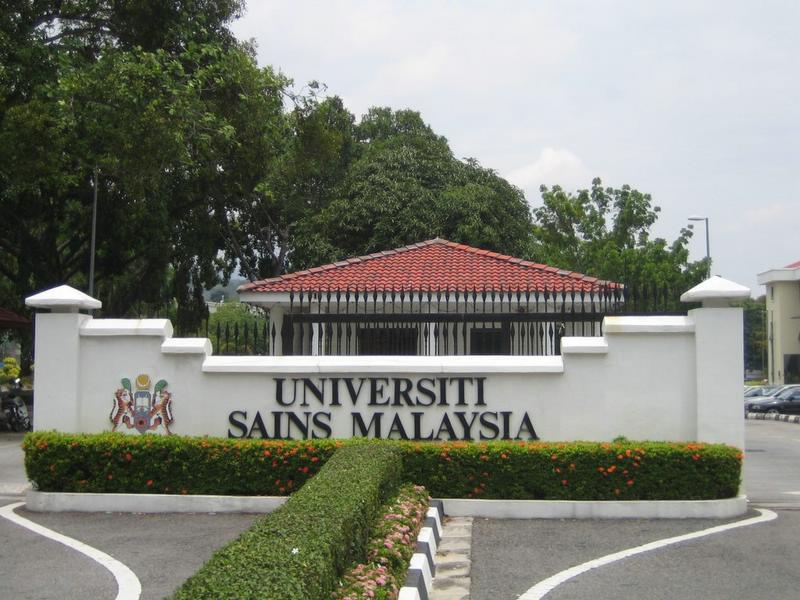
The Sungai Dua gate of the main campus (picture taken on 23 March 2006)

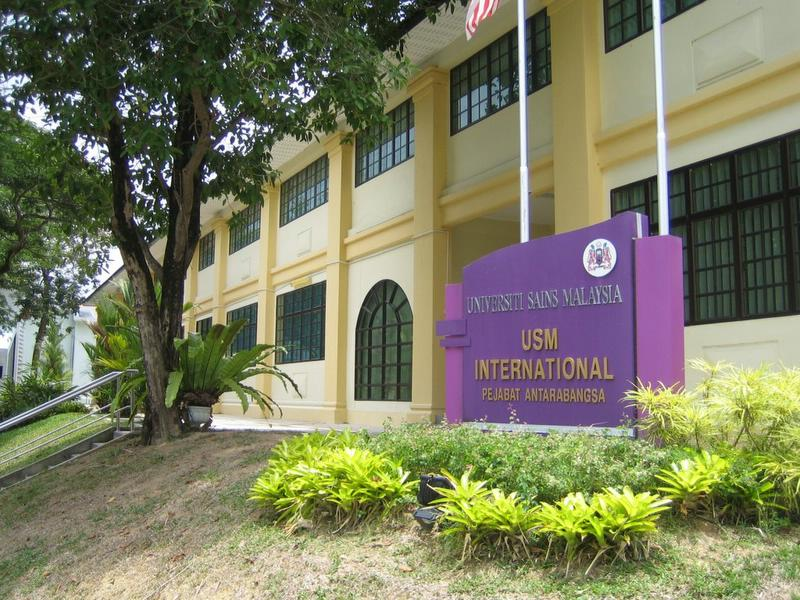
The international office of USM now known as International Mobility & Collaboration Centre or IMCC on the main campus (picture taken on 23 March 2006)

USM also has two off-campus sites in Penang Island:

- Sains@USM in Bukit Jambul
- Centre For Marine and Coastal Studies (CEMACS) in Teluk Aling, Penang National Park

== Activities ==
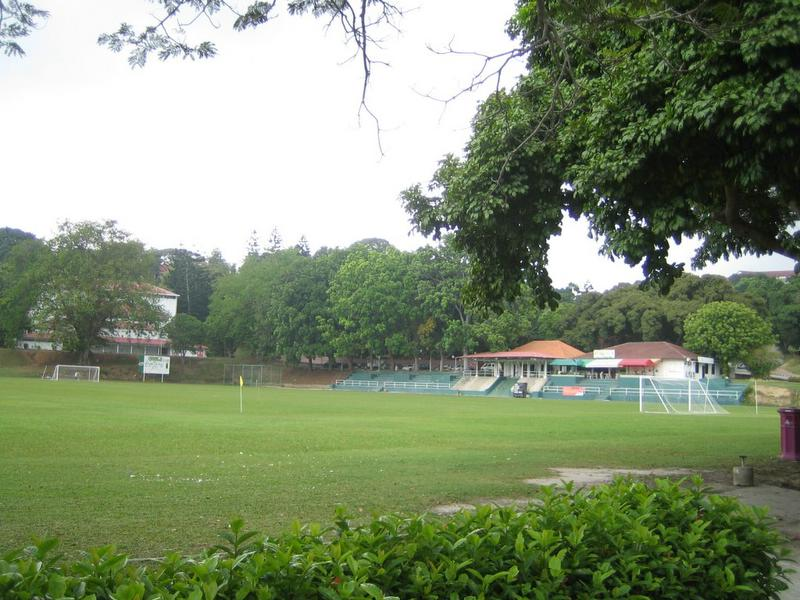
The football field on USM main campus (picture taken on 23 March 2006)

=== Arts ===
There are few musical ensembles in USM: a jazz orchestra called the USM Jazz Band that is composed of student musicians from various schools in the university, as well as a Chinese Orchestra, which comprises mainly Chinese students specialised in playing Chinese musical instruments.

=== Sports ===
USM's sports development and activities are mainly coordinated by its Sports and Recreation Centre, which was established in 1971. The university provides sporting facilities such as archery range, cricket, football field, badminton courts, tennis courts, hockey turfs, rugby field, softball, squash courts, swimming pool and basketball courts, which mostly concentrated in the main campus and vary from one campus to another. Some of the facilities in the main campus in Penang previously served as venues of major local and international tournaments like the 2000 edition of the national-level multi-sport event Sukma Games, the now-defunct biennial Penang state-level multi sport event Sukpen Games and the 2018 Asia Pacific Masters Games. The ground of the main campus was used as one of the venues for the 2008 Under-19 Cricket World Cup and the main venue of the Penang Bridge International Marathon since 1986, before this was relocated to Queensbay Mall in 2008.

Since 1973, USM organises the Annual Pesta Hoki (Hockey Festival) Hockey Tournament at the Hockey turfs near the USM Stadium and the Minden Grounds in the main campus, inviting both local and international teams to compete for titles across ten age-group categories. Another annual international age-group Tournament for Netball – Pesta Bola Jaring (Netball Festival) is organised by the university since 1993, but it is mainly for female participants only. The Main Campus Stadium is the venue for the Annual Athletics Meet (Malay: Temasya Olahraga Tahunan, TOT) since 1972, partaken by student athletes representing different residential colleges in the university. USM also organises various tournaments for its students in other sports like Frisbee, Football and Handball.

As a public university, Universiti Sains Malaysia is one of the 20 members of the University Sports Council of Malaysia (Malay: Majlis Sukan Universiti Malaysia, MASUM). It sends representatives to various interuniversity sport competitions every year, including the biennial Higher Education Institution Games (Malay: Sukan Institusi Pendidikan Tinggi, SUKIPT) since its inception in 2012 by the Ministry of Higher Education. Its highest achievement in the SUKIPT Games was winning 9 gold medals and placed 6th overall in the inaugural edition hosted by Universiti Teknologi MARA (UITM) in Shah Alam, Selangor, with most of the gold medals came from the sport of Swimming.

USM has a namesake football club, USM F.C., which consists of mainly university staff members as players. Formerly competing in the Malaysia Premier League, it nowadays compete in mostly local veteran football tournaments. Apart from football, university staffs also play other sports like Badminton, Handball, Netball, Athletics, Tennis and Table Tennis and participate in various interuniversity staff sport competitions such as the annual Malaysia Interuniversity Staff Games (Malay: Sukan Staf Antara Universiti Malaysia, SUKUM).

== Ranking ==
The university was ranked 111th in the World University Rankings 2004 published by the Times Higher Education Supplement.

In 2015, USM was ranked 87th in Best Global Universities for Engineering of U.S. News & World Report College and University Ranking.

Ranking	2026	2025	2024	2023	2022	2021	2020	2019	2018	2017	2016	2015	2014	2013	2012
QS World University Rankings	134	146	137	143	147	142	165	207	264	330	289	309		355	326
Times Higher Education World University Rankings	401-500	401-500	401-500	601-800	601-800	601-800	601-800	601-800	601-800	601-800	601-800				
Times Higher Education Impact Rankings		14	18	4	4	39	65	49							
Shanghai Ranking		701-800	601-700	601-700	501-600	701-800						401–500			

== Notable alumni ==
The alumni of USM include politicians such as Mohd Ali Rustam, current Yang di-Pertua Negeri of Malacca, Chow Kon Yeow, current Chief Minister of Penang, Wan Rosdy Wan Ismail, current Menteri Besar of Pahang, Muhammad Sanusi Md Nor, current Menteri Besar of Kedah and Yusril Ihza Mahendra, current general chairman of the Crescent Star Party (Indonesia).

== See also ==
- List of Islamic educational institutions
