= Gelugor =

- Suburb of George Town
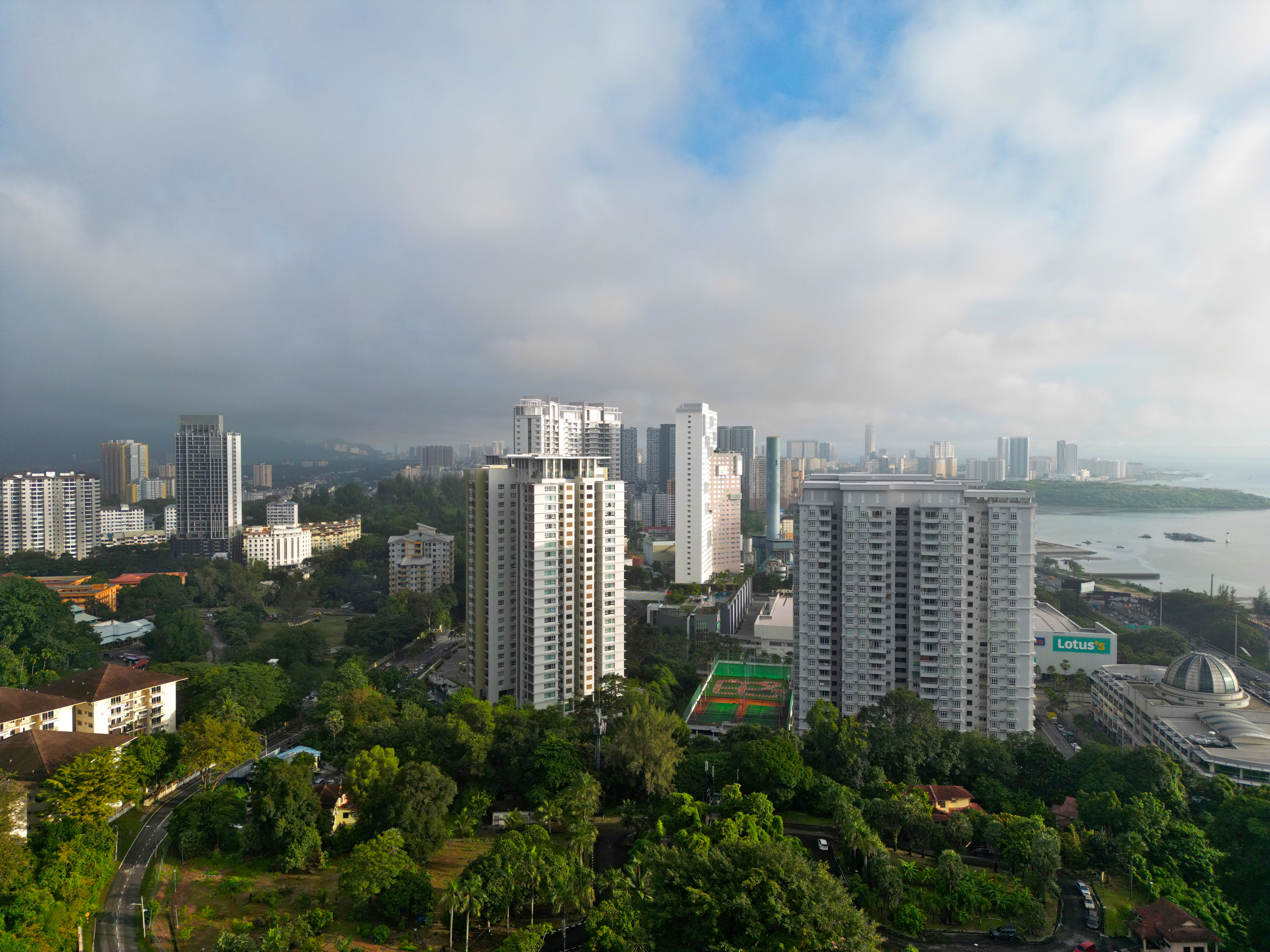
- Interactive map of Gelugor
- Location within George Town in Penang
- Coordinates: 5°22′7.91″N 100°18′22.29″E
- Country: Malaysia
- State: Penang
- City: George Town
- District: Northeast

Area
  - Total: 2.9 km^{2} (1.1 sq mi)

Population (2020)
  - Total: 18,662
  - Density: 6,400/km^{2} (17,000/sq mi)

Demographics
  - Ethnic groups: 48.7% Bumiputera; 47.2% Malay; 1.5% indigenous groups from Sabah and Sarawak; 33.1% Chinese; 12.9% Indian; 0.5% Other ethnicities; 4.8% Non-citizens
- Time zone: UTC+8 (MST)
  - Summer (DST): Not observed
- Postal code: 11700

Gelugor (Note: Formerly spelt as Glugor.) is a suburb of George Town in the Malaysian state of Penang. Named after a plant species, Gelugor lies along the eastern seaboard of Penang Island, between Jelutong and Sungai Dua, and nearly 5 km (3.1 mi) south of the city centre.

Gelugor had been populated as early as the late 18th century by Malay fishermen who arrived from Sumatra. The area was then cleared for agricultural plantations by David Brown, a partner of Captain Francis Light.

Urbanisation of the area began in earnest in the 1960s, when residential estates were established within the area. Gelugor gradually turned into a suburb, helped by its strategic location right in between the city centre and Bayan Lepas to the south. In 1969, Universiti Sains Malaysia was founded at Gelugor and is now one of the top Malaysian public universities.

== Etymology ==
Gelugor was named after Garcinia atroviridis, known in Malay as asam gelugor. Widely endemic in the Malay Peninsula, this species is especially cultivated on Penang Island for its medicinal properties.

== History ==
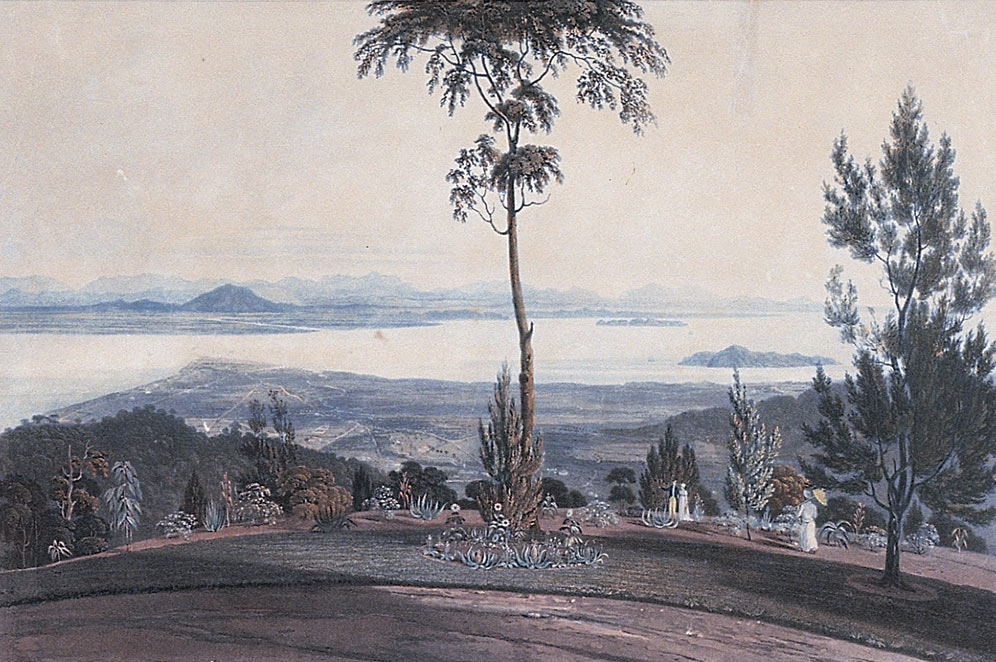
An 1818 painting of the view overlooking the city centre and Gelugor.

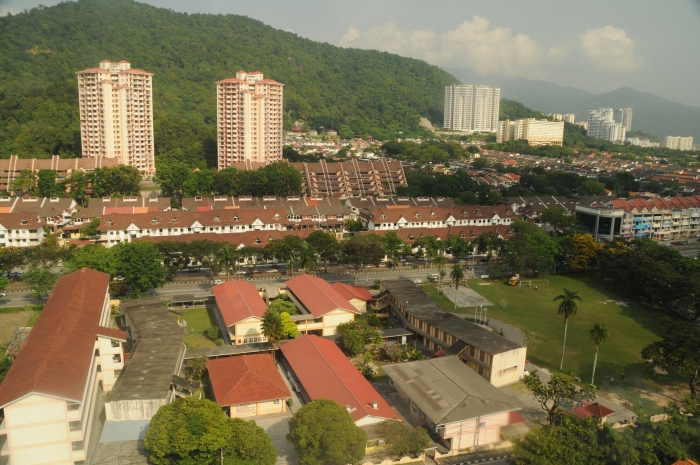
A residential neighbourhood at Gelugor

Gelugor was one of the first areas of Penang Island to be inhabited. Fishermen had moved into the area from Sumatra in the 18th century, predating Captain Francis Light's founding of Penang Island in 1786. They settled around the mouth of the Gelugor River (Malay: Sungai Gelugor) and Bukit Gelugor.

Soon after Light came ashore in what is now the city centre in 1786, his Scottish partner, David Brown, cleared the jungles around Gelugor to make way for agricultural purposes, including spice and coconut plantations. Brown also brought in labourers from India to work in the estates. He eventually became the largest landowner on the island in the early 19th century.

Up until the end of World War II, Gelugor remained a rural area. Prior to the war, the British Army converted one of David Brown's houses into the Glugor Barracks, to be renamed later as Minden Barracks. The army camp was occupied by the Imperial Japanese Army during the war. It was again put in use during the Malayan Emergency and the Indonesian Confrontation, before being closed for good in 1971 following the withdrawal of all British armed forces from Southeast Asia.

The development of residential estates at Gelugor began in the 1960s, originally to house civil servants. Also in the 1960s, a proposal to establish Penang's first university was mooted. Eventually, the Penang University (Malay: Universiti Pulau Pinang) was founded in 1969, before being relocated to the former Minden Barracks in 1971. The university has since been renamed Universiti Sains Malaysia, now one of the foremost public universities in Malaysia.

== Geography ==
Map of Gelugor.
Click link at the top right corner to zoom in.
1 Universiti Sains Malaysia
2 Minden Heights
3 Taman Tun Sardon
4 Taman Brown
5 Kampung Kastam

== Demographics ==
Ethnicities within Gelugor in 2020
Ethnicities / Nationality	Percentage
Malays	47.2%
Other Bumiputeras	1.5%
Chinese	33.1%
Indians	12.9%
Others	0.5%
Non-Malaysians	4.8%

As of 2020, Gelugor was home to a population of 18,662, resulting in a population density of 6,435/km^{2} (16,670/sq mi). Malays formed 47% of the suburb's population, followed by Chinese at 33% and Indians at nearly 13%.

== Transportation ==
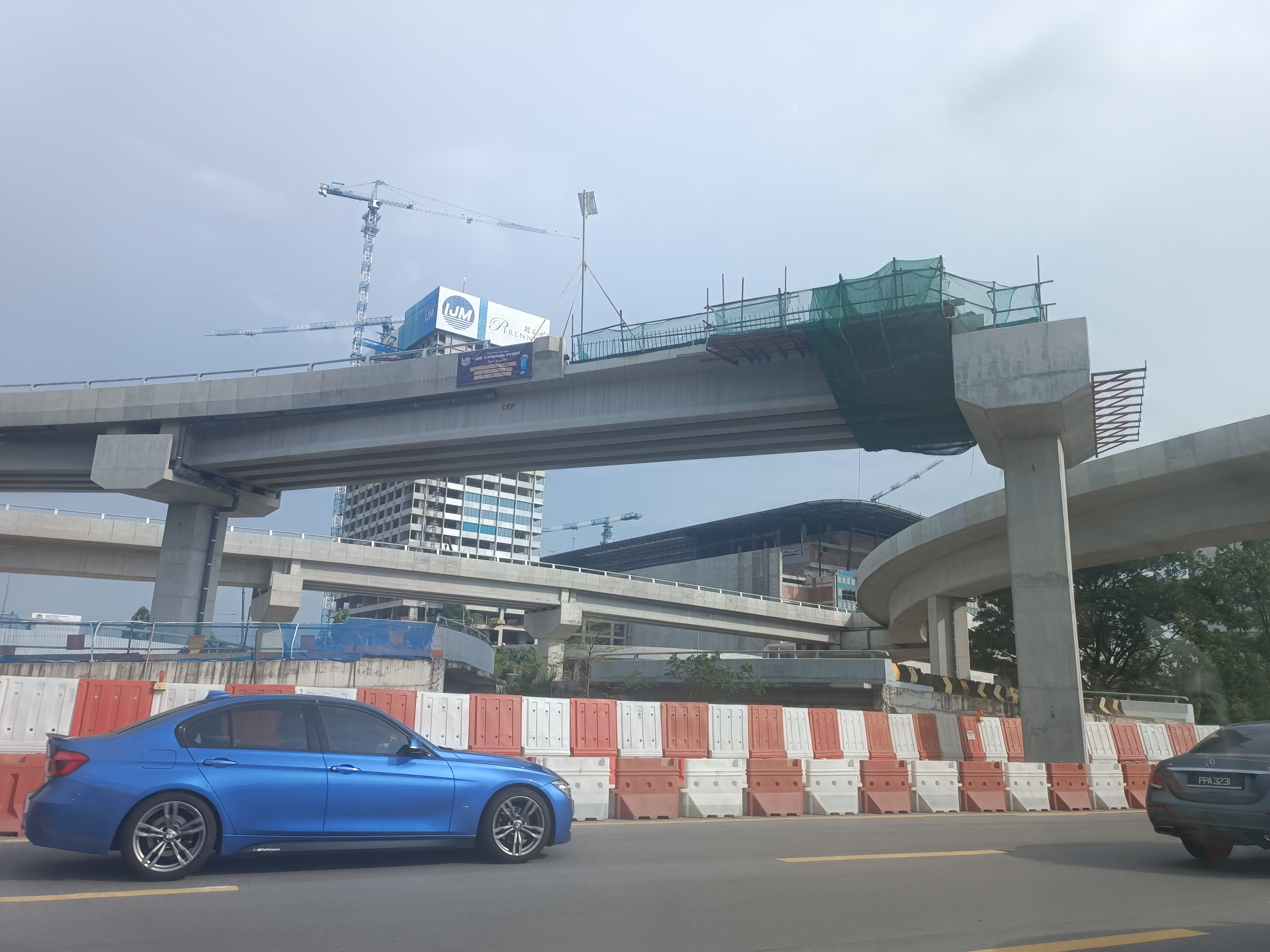
Construction of the Ayer Itam–Tun Dr Lim Chong Eu Expressway Bypass

Jalan Sultan Azlan Shah serves as the main thoroughfare within Gelugor. In recent years, much of the pan-island and incoming traffic from the Penang Bridge have been diverted to the Tun Dr Lim Chong Eu Expressway that runs along the suburb's periphery. Construction of the 6 km (3.7 mi) long Ayer Itam–Tun Dr Lim Chong Eu Expressway Bypass, part of the Penang Transport Master Plan, is ongoing and expected to be completed by 2025. The bypass was designed to relieve congestion on the expressway by providing an alternative route through the suburb to Paya Terubong.

Rapid Penang routes 11, 13, 102, 206, 301, 302, 303, 304 and 401 serve the residents of the suburb, by connecting Gelugor with the city centre and other destinations such as the Penang International Airport, Ayer Itam, Tanjung Bungah and Balik Pulau.

In addition, a cycling lane has been installed along the Tun Dr Lim Chong Eu Expressway as part of the move to encourage cycling as a form of alternative transportation. This 12.5 km (7.8 miles)-long cycling lane extends from the city centre towards Queensbay Mall, south of the Penang Bridge.

== Education ==
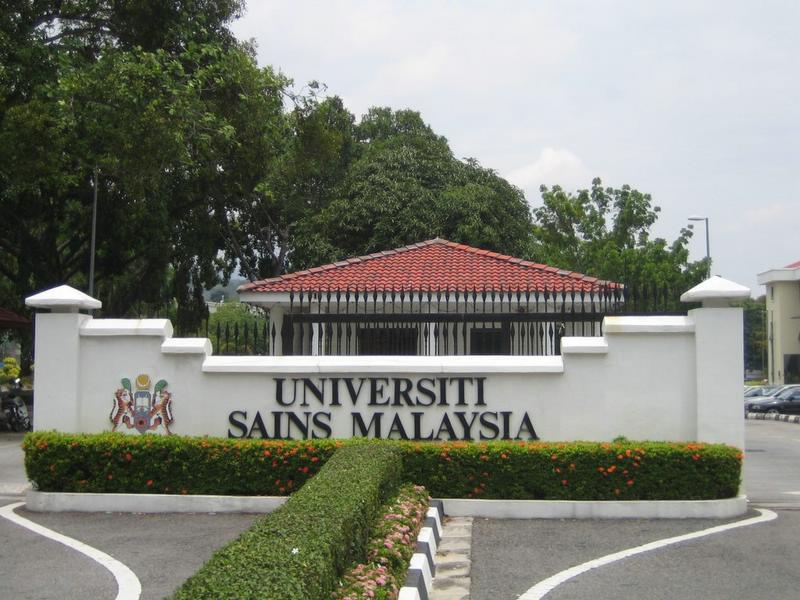
The main campus of Universiti Sains Malaysia is situated within Gelugor.

A total of two primary schools and a high school are located within Gelugor. These national schools are listed as follows.

Primary schools

- SK Bukit Gelugor
- SK Minden Height

High school

- SMK Datuk Hj. Mohamed Nor Ahmad

Gelugor is home to one of the top Malaysian public universities, Universiti Sains Malaysia (USM). It was ranked fifth within Malaysia by the QS World University Rankings as of 2016. USM is also the only university in Malaysia to be accorded APEX University status by the Malaysian federal government and one of the handful autonomous universities nationwide.
