= Perai River =

River in Penang, Malaysia

Coordinates: 5°23′N 100°22′E

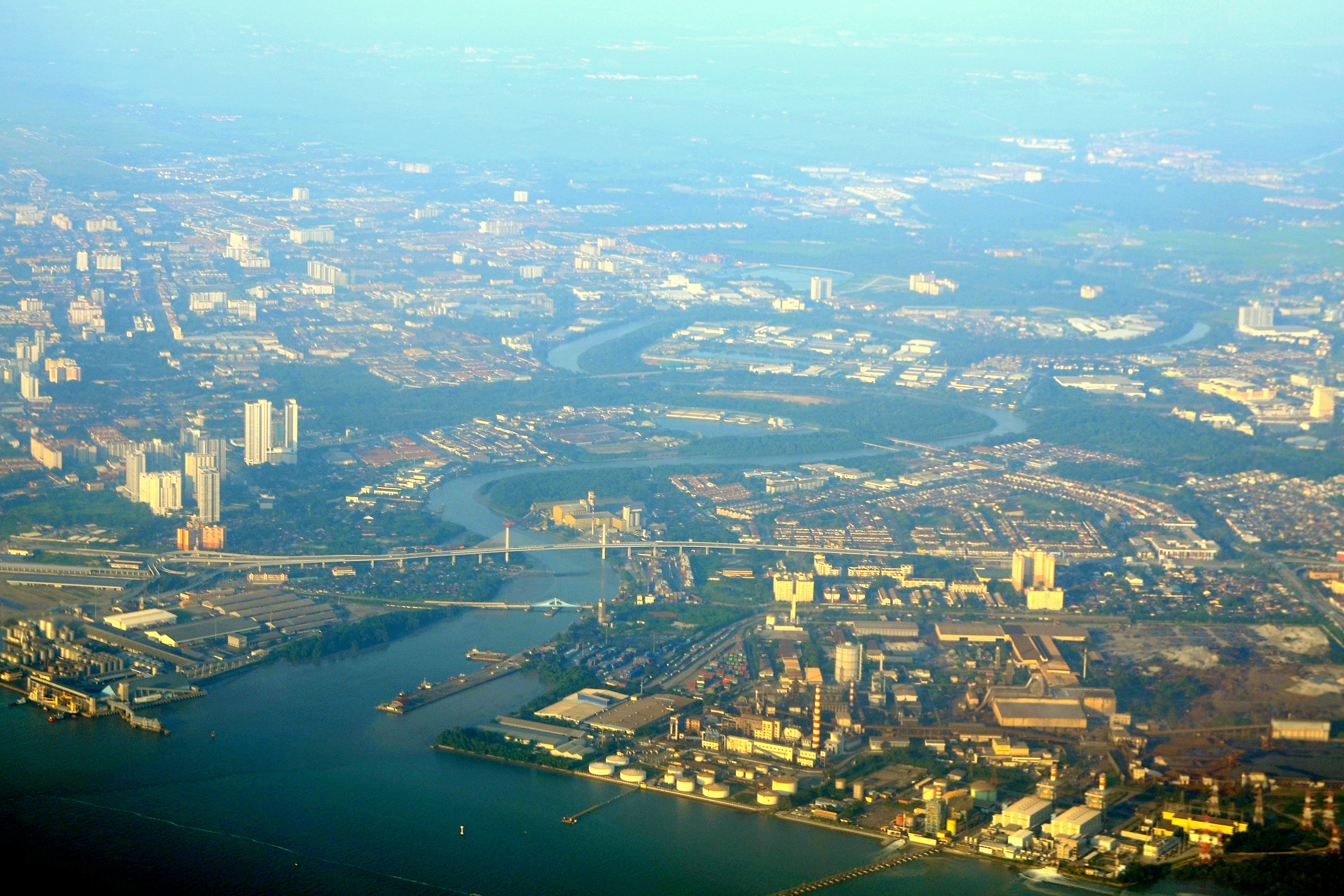
Aerial view of the Perai River estuary with Bagan Dalam (left) and Perai (right)

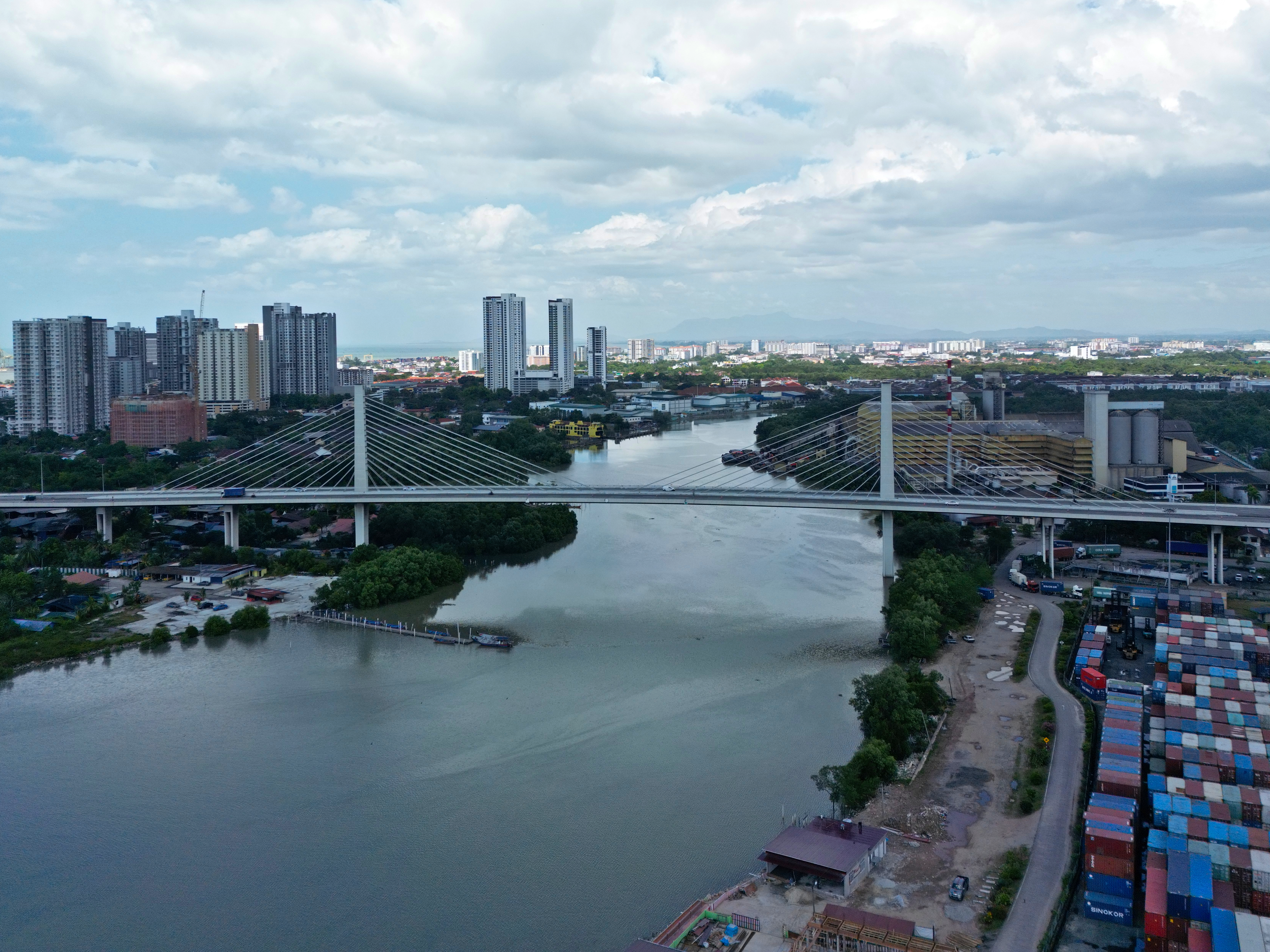
Perai River Bridge

The Perai River (Malay: Sungai Perai) is a major river in Penang, Malaysia. It also acts as the mother river of Butterworth. The course of the river separates Perai and the Seberang Jaya suburb.

== See also ==
- List of rivers of Malaysia
