= Results of the 2018 Malaysian state elections by constituency =

These are the election results of the 2018 Malaysian general election by state constituency. State assembly elections were held in Malaysia on 9 May 2018 as part of the general elections. Results are expected to come on the same day, after 5 pm. Elected members of the legislative assembly (MLAs) will be representing their constituency from the first sitting of respective state legislative assembly to its dissolution.

The state legislature election deposit was set at RM5,000 per candidate. Similar to previous elections, the election deposit will be forfeited if the particular candidate had failed to secure at least 12.5% or one-eighth of the votes.

== Perlis ==
#	Constituency s	Winner	Votes	Majority	Opponent(s)	Votes	Incumbent	Incumbent Majority
BN 10 | GS 2 | PH 3 | Independent 0
N1	Titi Tinggi	Teh Chai Aan (BN-MCA)	2,762	142	Teh Seng Chuan (PH-DAP)	2,620	Khaw Hock Kong (BN-MCA)	1,486
N1	Titi Tinggi	Teh Chai Aan (BN-MCA)	2,762	142	Kamis Yub (GS-PAS)	2,291	Khaw Hock Kong (BN-MCA)	1,486
N1	Titi Tinggi	Teh Chai Aan (BN-MCA)	2,762	142	Yaacob Man (myPPP)	132	Khaw Hock Kong (BN-MCA)	1,486
N2	Beseri	Ruzaini Rais (BN-UMNO)	2,879	416	Wan Kharizal Wan Khazim (PH-PAN)	2,463	Md Rawi Kassim (BN-UMNO)	540
N2	Beseri	Ruzaini Rais (BN-UMNO)	2,879	416	Azamhari Mohamood (GS-PAS)	1,523	Md Rawi Kassim (BN-UMNO)	540
N3	Chuping	Asmaiza Ahmad (BN-UMNO)	3,889	1,367	Poziyah Hamzah (PH-PKR)	2,522	Asmaiza Ahmad (BN-UMNO)	2,876
N3	Chuping	Asmaiza Ahmad (BN-UMNO)	3,889	1,367	Mohd Ali Puteh (GS-PAS)	1,967	Asmaiza Ahmad (BN-UMNO)	2,876
N4	Mata Ayer	Siti Berenee Yahaya (BN-UMNO)	2,684	720	Azhar Omar (PH-PPBM)	1,964	Khairi Hasan (BN-UMNO)	1,989
N4	Mata Ayer	Siti Berenee Yahaya (BN-UMNO)	2,684	720	Mohammad Yahya (GS-PAS)	1,516	Khairi Hasan (BN-UMNO)	1,989
N5	Santan	Azizan Sulaiman (BN-UMNO)	3,071	949	Che Mazlina Che Yob (PH-PAN)	2,122	Sabry Ahmad (BN-UMNO)	1,084
N5	Santan	Azizan Sulaiman (BN-UMNO)	3,071	949	Baharuddin Ahmad (GS-PAS)	2,088	Sabry Ahmad (BN-UMNO)	1,084
N6	Bintong	Azlan Man (BN-UMNO)	3,986	847	Mokhtar Che Kassim (PH-PAN)	3,139	Rela Ahmad (BN-UMNO)	1,237
N6	Bintong	Azlan Man (BN-UMNO)	3,986	847	Abd Jamil Kamis (GS-PAS)	2,695	Rela Ahmad (BN-UMNO)	1,237
N7	Sena	Asrul Nizan Abd Jalil (PH-PKR)	4,177	314	Azihani Ali (BN-UMNO)	3,863	Abdul Jamil Saad (BN-UMNO)	1,924
N7	Sena	Asrul Nizan Abd Jalil (PH-PKR)	4,177	314	Fakhrul Anwar Ismail (GS-PAS)	1,888	Abdul Jamil Saad (BN-UMNO)	1,924
N8	Indera Kayangan	Gan Ay Ling (PH-PKR)	5,023	3,177	Chuah Tian Hee (BN-MCA)	1,846	Chan Ming Kai (PH-PKR)	1,092
N8	Indera Kayangan	Gan Ay Ling (PH-PKR)	5,023	3,177	Wan Hassan Wan Ismail (GS-PAS)	1,835	Chan Ming Kai (PH-PKR)	1,092
N9	Kuala Perlis	Nor Azam Karap (PH-PKR)	4,253	1,254	Azam Rashid (BN-UMNO)	2,999	Mat Hassan (BN-UMNO)	1,384
N9	Kuala Perlis	Nor Azam Karap (PH-PKR)	4,253	1,254	Mohamad Fuat Abu Bakar (GS-PAS)	1,066	Mat Hassan (BN-UMNO)	1,384
N10	Kayang	Hamizan Hassan (BN-UMNO)	3,275	435	Abdul Hannaan Khairy (PH-PPBM)	2,840	Ahmad Bakri Ali (BN-UMNO)	664
N10	Kayang	Hamizan Hassan (BN-UMNO)	3,275	435	Md Radzi Hassan (GS-PAS)	1,855	Ahmad Bakri Ali (BN-UMNO)	664
N11	Pauh	Rozieana Ahmad (BN-UMNO)	3,564	143	Ameir Hassan (PH-PPBM)	3,421	Azlan Man (BN-UMNO)	1,382
N11	Pauh	Rozieana Ahmad (BN-UMNO)	3,564	143	Idris Yaacob (GS-PAS)	2,085	Azlan Man (BN-UMNO)	1,382
N12	Tambun Tulang	Ismail Kassim (BN-UMNO)	4,005	1,180	Maton Din (PH-PPBM)	2,825	Ismail Kassim (BN-UMNO)	2,481
N12	Tambun Tulang	Ismail Kassim (BN-UMNO)	4,005	1,180	Abu Bakar Ali (GS-PAS)	1,910	Ismail Kassim (BN-UMNO)	2,481
N13	Guar Sanji	Mohd Ridzuan Hashim (GS-PAS)	3,199	328	Afifi Osman (BN-UMNO)	2,871	Jafperi Othman (BN-UMNO)	927
N13	Guar Sanji	Mohd Ridzuan Hashim (GS-PAS)	3,199	328	Baridah Che Nayan (PH-PPBM)	1,512	Jafperi Othman (BN-UMNO)	927
N14	Simpang Empat	Nurulhisham Yaakob (BN-UMNO)	2,528	82	Rus'sele Eizan (GS-PAS)	2,446	Nurulhisham Yaakob (BN-UMNO)	85
N14	Simpang Empat	Nurulhisham Yaakob (BN-UMNO)	2,528	82	Wan Noralhakim Shaghir Saad (PH-PKR)	1,960	Nurulhisham Yaakob (BN-UMNO)	85
N15	Sanglang	Mohd. Shukri Ramli (GS-PAS)	2,971	42	Zaidi Saidin (BN-UMNO)	2,929	Mohd Shukri Ramli (PAS)	121
N15	Sanglang	Mohd. Shukri Ramli (GS-PAS)	2,971	42	Zolkharnain Abidin (PH-PAN)	1,379	Mohd Shukri Ramli (PAS)	121

== Kedah ==
#	Constituency	Winner	Votes	Majority	Opponent(s)	Votes	Incumbent	Incumbent Majority
BN 3 | GS 15 | PH 18 | Independent 0
N1	Ayer Hangat	Juhari Bulat (PH-PPBM)	7,550	1,532	Mohd Rawi Abdul Hamid (BN-UMNO)	6,018	Mohd Rawi Abdul Hamid (BN-UMNO)	5,311
N1	Ayer Hangat	Juhari Bulat (PH-PPBM)	7,550	1,532	Azlina Azinan (GS-PAS)	4,034	Mohd Rawi Abdul Hamid (BN-UMNO)	5,311
N2	Kuah	Mohd Firdaus Ahmad (PH-PPBM)	8,276	2,452	Nor Saidi Nanyan (BN-UMNO)	5,824	Nor Saidi Nanyan (BN-UMNO)	6,371
N2	Kuah	Mohd Firdaus Ahmad (PH-PPBM)	8,276	2,452	Mazlan Ahmad (GS-PAS)	2,685	Nor Saidi Nanyan (BN-UMNO)	6,371
N2	Kuah	Mohd Firdaus Ahmad (PH-PPBM)	8,276	2,452	Mohamad Ratu Mansor (IND)	86	Nor Saidi Nanyan (BN-UMNO)	6,371
N3	Kota Siputeh	Salmee Said (PH-PAN)	7,265	1,467	Mat Rejab Md Akhir (GS-PAS)	5,798	Abu Hasan Sarif (BN-UMNO)	2,238
N3	Kota Siputeh	Salmee Said (PH-PAN)	7,265	1,467	Ahmad Azhar Abdullah (BN-UMNO)	5,795	Abu Hasan Sarif (BN-UMNO)	2,238
N4	Ayer Hitam	Azhar Ibrahim (GS-PAS)	9,229	537	A. Aziz Mohamod (PH-PPBM)	8,692	Mukhriz Mahathir (PH-PPBM)	2,446
N4	Ayer Hitam	Azhar Ibrahim (GS-PAS)	9,229	537	Abu Hasan Sarif (BN-UMNO)	7,220	Mukhriz Mahathir (PH-PPBM)	2,446
N5	Bukit Kayu Hitam	Halimaton Shaadiah Saad (PH-PPBM)	11,027	2,153	Ahmad Zaini Japar (BN-UMNO)	8,874	Ahmad Zaini Japar (BN-UMNO)	7,873
N5	Bukit Kayu Hitam	Halimaton Shaadiah Saad (PH-PPBM)	11,027	2,153	Habshah Bakar (GS-PAS)	6,528	Ahmad Zaini Japar (BN-UMNO)	7,873
N6	Jitra	Mukhriz Mahathir (PH-PPBM)	18,852	10,849	Aminuddin Omar (BN-UMNO)	8,003	Aminuddin Omar (BN-UMNO)	3,056
N6	Jitra	Mukhriz Mahathir (PH-PPBM)	18,852	10,849	Zulhazmi Othman (GS-PAS)	7,064	Aminuddin Omar (BN-UMNO)	3,056
N7	Kuala Nerang	Munir @ Mohamad Yusoff Zakaria (GS-PAS)	9,118	1,619	Badrol Hisham Hashim (BN-UMNO)	7,499	Badrol Hisham Hashim (BN-UMNO)	1,997
N7	Kuala Nerang	Munir @ Mohamad Yusoff Zakaria (GS-PAS)	9,118	1,619	Syed Fadzil Syed Embun (PH-PPBM)	3,376	Badrol Hisham Hashim (BN-UMNO)	1,997
N8	Pedu	Mohd Radzi Md Amin (GS-PAS)	8,164	670	Kama Noriah Ibrahim (BN-UMNO)	7,494	Kama Noriah Ibrahim (BN-UMNO)	2,960
N8	Pedu	Mohd Radzi Md Amin (GS-PAS)	8,164	670	Hashim Idris (PH-PKR)	3,272	Kama Noriah Ibrahim (BN-UMNO)	2,960
N9	Bukit Lada	Salim Mahmood (GS-PAS)	9,573	1,285	Ariffin Man (BN-UMNO)	8,288	Ahmad Lebai Sudin (BN-UMNO)	1,324
N9	Bukit Lada	Salim Mahmood (GS-PAS)	9,573	1,285	Mohd Aizad Roslan (PH-PPBM)	6,337	Ahmad Lebai Sudin (BN-UMNO)	1,324
N9	Bukit Lada	Salim Mahmood (GS-PAS)	9,573	1,285	Mohd Ismail Othman (IND)	444	Ahmad Lebai Sudin (BN-UMNO)	1,324
N10	Bukit Pinang	Wan Romani Wan Salim (GS-PAS)	10,432	3,212	Che Mat Dzaher Ahmad (PH-PKR)	7,220	Wan Romani Wan Salim (GS-PAS)	1,672
N10	Bukit Pinang	Wan Romani Wan Salim (GS-PAS)	10,432	3,212	Mohammad Nawar Ariffin (BN-UMNO)	6,289	Wan Romani Wan Salim (GS-PAS)	1,672
N11	Derga	Tan Kok Yew (PH-DAP)	11,232	5,265	Yahya Saad (GS-PAS)	5,967	Tan Kok Yew (PH-DAP)	1,156
N11	Derga	Tan Kok Yew (PH-DAP)	11,232	5,265	Cheah Soon Hai (BN-GERAKAN)	4,916	Tan Kok Yew (PH-DAP)	1,156
N12	Suka Menanti (previously known as Bakar Bata)	Zamri Yusuf (PH-PKR)	13,301	6,251	Ahmad Bashah Md Hanipah (BN-UMNO)	7,050	Ahmad Bashah Md Hanipah (BN-UMNO)	895
N12	Suka Menanti (previously known as Bakar Bata)	Zamri Yusuf (PH-PKR)	13,301	6,251	Mohd Sabri Omar (GS-PAS)	4,580	Ahmad Bashah Md Hanipah (BN-UMNO)	895
N13	Kota Darul Aman	Teh Swee Leong (PH-DAP)	11,737	8,468	Tan Eng Hwa (BN-MCA)	3,269	Teoh Boon Kok @ Teoh Kai Kok (PH-DAP)	2,626
N13	Kota Darul Aman	Teh Swee Leong (PH-DAP)	11,737	8,468	Zulkifli Che Haron (GS-PAS)	1,732	Teoh Boon Kok @ Teoh Kai Kok (PH-DAP)	2,626
N13	Kota Darul Aman	Teh Swee Leong (PH-DAP)	11,737	8,468	Tan Kang Yap (PRM)	32	Teoh Boon Kok @ Teoh Kai Kok (PH-DAP)	2,626
N14	Alor Mengkudu	Phahrolrazi Mohd Zawawi (PH-PAN)	8,840	1,876	Ahmad Saad @ Yahaya (GS-PAS)	6,964	Ahmad Saad @ Yahaya (GS-PAS)	1,856
N14	Alor Mengkudu	Phahrolrazi Mohd Zawawi (PH-PAN)	8,840	1,876	Abdul Malik Saad (BN-UMNO)	6,434	Ahmad Saad @ Yahaya (GS-PAS)	1,856
N15	Anak Bukit	Amiruddin Hamzah (PH-PPBM)	9,810	1,579	Hamdi Ishak (GS-PAS)	8,231	Amiruddin Hamzah (PH-PPBM)	2,806
N15	Anak Bukit	Amiruddin Hamzah (PH-PPBM)	9,810	1,579	Johari Aziz (BN-UMNO)	5,200	Amiruddin Hamzah (PH-PPBM)	2,806
N16	Kubang Rotan	Mohd Asmirul Anuar Aris (PH-PAN)	14,004	6,535	Abdul Muthalib Harun (BN-UMNO)	7,469	Mohd Nasir Mustafa (GS-PAS)	1,044
N16	Kubang Rotan	Mohd Asmirul Anuar Aris (PH-PAN)	14,004	6,535	Omar Saad (GS-PAS)	7,303	Mohd Nasir Mustafa (GS-PAS)	1,044
N17	Pengkalan Kundor	Ismail Salleh (PH-PAN)	11,578	2,490	Ahmad Fakhruddin Sheikh Fakhrurrazi (GS-PAS)	9,088	Phahrolrazi Mohd Zawawi (PH-PAN)	3,884
N17	Pengkalan Kundor	Ismail Salleh (PH-PAN)	11,578	2,490	Abd Halim Said (BN-UMNO)	6,524	Phahrolrazi Mohd Zawawi (PH-PAN)	3,884
N18	Tokai	Mohd Hayati Othman (GS-PAS)	15,941	8,049	Fatahi Omar (BN-UMNO)	7,892	Mohamed Taulan Mat Rasul (GS-PAS)	5,833
N18	Tokai	Mohd Hayati Othman (GS-PAS)	15,941	8,049	Mohd Firdaus Jaafar (PH-PAN)	6,632	Mohamed Taulan Mat Rasul (GS-PAS)	5,833
N19	Sungai Tiang	Suraya Yaacob (BN-UMNO)	12,213	641	Saiful Syazwan Shafie (GS-PAS)	11,572	Suraya Yaacob (BN-UMNO)	6,994
N19	Sungai Tiang	Suraya Yaacob (BN-UMNO)	12,213	641	Abdul Razak Khamis (PH-PPBM)	8,028	Suraya Yaacob (BN-UMNO)	6,994
N20	Sungai Limau	Mohd Azam Abd Samat (GS-PAS)	13,048	5,973	Norma Awang (BN-UMNO)	7,075	Mohd Azam Abd Samat (GS-PAS)	2,774
N20	Sungai Limau	Mohd Azam Abd Samat (GS-PAS)	13,048	5,973	Zahran Abdullah (PH-PAN)	4,493	Mohd Azam Abd Samat (GS-PAS)	2,774
N21	Guar Chempedak	Ku Abdul Rahman Ku Ismail (BN-UMNO)	6,518	259	Musoddak Ahmad (GS-PAS)	6,259	Ku Abdul Rahman Ku Ismail (BN-UMNO)	2,298
N21	Guar Chempedak	Ku Abdul Rahman Ku Ismail (BN-UMNO)	6,518	259	Mohd Saffuan Sabari (PH-PPBM)	5,686	Ku Abdul Rahman Ku Ismail (BN-UMNO)	2,298
N22	Gurun	Johari Abdul (PH-PKR)	10,732	4,207	Boey Chin Gan (BN-MCA)	6,525	Leong Yong Kong (BN-MCA)	1,296
N22	Gurun	Johari Abdul (PH-PKR)	10,732	4,207	Muzaini Azizan (GS-PAS)	5,257	Leong Yong Kong (BN-MCA)	1,296
N22	Gurun	Johari Abdul (PH-PKR)	10,732	4,207	Palaniappan Marimuthu (IND)	167	Leong Yong Kong (BN-MCA)	1,296
N23	Belantek	Mad Isa Shafie (GS-PAS)	9,600	2,574	Mohd Tajudin Abdullah (BN-UMNO)	7,026	Mohd Tajudin Abdullah (BN-UMNO)	842
N23	Belantek	Mad Isa Shafie (GS-PAS)	9,600	2,574	Abdul Rashid Abdullah (PH-PAN)	2,376	Mohd Tajudin Abdullah (BN-UMNO)	842
N24	Jeneri	Muhammad Sanusi Md Nor (GS-PAS)	10,626	2,455	Mahadzir Abdul Hamid (BN-UMNO)	8,171	Mahadzir Abdul Hamid (BN-UMNO)	2,060
N24	Jeneri	Muhammad Sanusi Md Nor (GS-PAS)	10,626	2,455	Mohd Nazri Abu Hassan (PH-PPBM)	4,146	Mahadzir Abdul Hamid (BN-UMNO)	2,060
N25	Bukit Selambau	Summugam Rengasamy (PH-PKR)	17,573	5,635	Mohd Ali Sulaiman (GS-PAS)	11,938	Krishnamoorthy Rajannaidu (PH-PKR)	530
N25	Bukit Selambau	Summugam Rengasamy (PH-PKR)	17,573	5,635	Jaspal Singh Gurbakhes Singh (BN-MIC)	9,449	Krishnamoorthy Rajannaidu (PH-PKR)	530
N26	Tanjong Dawai	Hanif Ghazali (GS-PAS)	11,444	952	Anuar Abdul Hamid (PH-PPBM)	10,492	Tajul Urus Mat Zain (BN-UMNO)	3,780
N26	Tanjong Dawai	Hanif Ghazali (GS-PAS)	11,444	952	Annuar Ahmad (BN-UMNO)	10,421	Tajul Urus Mat Zain (BN-UMNO)	3,780
N27	Pantai Merdeka	Ahmad Fadzli Hashim (GS-PAS)	14,133	4,566	Ali Yahaya (BN-UMNO)	9,567	Ali Yahaya (BN-UMNO)	1,707
N27	Pantai Merdeka	Ahmad Fadzli Hashim (GS-PAS)	14,133	4,566	Rosli Yusof (PH-PAN)	7,281	Ali Yahaya (BN-UMNO)	1,707
N28	Bakar Arang	Simon Ooi Tze Min (PH-PKR)	18,440	10,833	Othman Che Mee (GS-PAS)	7,607	Simon Ooi Tze Min (PH-PKR)	6,534
N28	Bakar Arang	Simon Ooi Tze Min (PH-PKR)	18,440	10,833	Ko Hung Weng (BN-MCA)	5,547	Simon Ooi Tze Min (PH-PKR)	6,534
N28	Bakar Arang	Simon Ooi Tze Min (PH-PKR)	18,440	10,833	Tan Khee Chye (PRM)	58	Simon Ooi Tze Min (PH-PKR)	6,534
N28	Bakar Arang	Simon Ooi Tze Min (PH-PKR)	18,440	10,833	Tan Hock Huat (IND)	29	Simon Ooi Tze Min (PH-PKR)	6,534
N29	Sidam	Robert Ling Kui Ee (PH-PKR)	17,344	10,860	Nur Hidayah Foo Abdullah (GS-PAS)	6,484	Robert Ling Kui Ee (PH-PKR)	5,964
N29	Sidam	Robert Ling Kui Ee (PH-PKR)	17,344	10,860	Tan Kok Seong (BN-GERAKAN)	5,951	Robert Ling Kui Ee (PH-PKR)	5,964
N29	Sidam	Robert Ling Kui Ee (PH-PKR)	17,344	10,860	Mohd Hashim Saaludin (PRM)	80	Robert Ling Kui Ee (PH-PKR)	5,964
N30	Bayu	Abd Nasir Idris (GS-PAS)	14,339	924	Mohd Noor Mohamed Amin (BN-UMNO)	13,415	Azmi Che Husain (BN-UMNO)	4,132
N30	Bayu	Abd Nasir Idris (GS-PAS)	14,339	924	Abd Rahim Kechik (PH-PPBM)	5,059	Azmi Che Husain (BN-UMNO)	4,132
N31	Kupang	Najmi Ahmad (GS-PAS)	13,290	1,627	Harun Abd Aziz (BN-UMNO)	11,663	Harun Abd Aziz (BN-UMNO)	1,924
N31	Kupang	Najmi Ahmad (GS-PAS)	13,290	1,627	Johari Abdullah (PH-PAN)	4,168	Harun Abd Aziz (BN-UMNO)	1,924
N32	Kuala Ketil	Mansor Zakaria (GS-PAS)	12,574	1,581	Mohd Khairul Azhar Abdullah (BN-UMNO)	10,993	Md Zuki Yusof (GS-PAS)	1,154
N32	Kuala Ketil	Mansor Zakaria (GS-PAS)	12,574	1,581	Mohamad Sofee Razak (PH-PKR)	4,952	Md Zuki Yusof (GS-PAS)	1,154
N33	Merbau Pulas	Siti Ashah Ghazali (GS-PAS)	9,892	438	Asmadi Abu Talib (BN-UMNO)	9,454	Siti Ashah Ghazali (GS-PAS)	633
N33	Merbau Pulas	Siti Ashah Ghazali (GS-PAS)	9,892	438	Abd Razak Salleh (PH-PAN)	9,267	Siti Ashah Ghazali (GS-PAS)	633
N34	Lunas	Azman Nasrudin (PH-PKR)	23,904	13,813	Ahmad Taufiq Baharum (GS-PAS)	10,091	Azman Nasrudin (PH-PKR)	9,084
N34	Lunas	Azman Nasrudin (PH-PKR)	23,904	13,813	Thuraisingam K. S. Muthu (BN-MIC)	7,489	Azman Nasrudin (PH-PKR)	9,084
N35	Kulim	Yeo Keng Chuan (PH-PKR)	13,070	3,795	Chua Thiong Gee (BN-MCA)	9,275	Chua Thiong Gee (BN-MCA)	643
N35	Kulim	Yeo Keng Chuan (PH-PKR)	13,070	3,795	Mohd Khairi Mohd Salleh (GS-PAS)	9,080	Chua Thiong Gee (BN-MCA)	643
N35	Kulim	Yeo Keng Chuan (PH-PKR)	13,070	3,795	Lee Ah Liong (PRM)	34	Chua Thiong Gee (BN-MCA)	643
N36	Bandar Baharu	Norsabrina Mohd. Noor (BN-UMNO)	7,884	377	Azimi Daim (PH-PPBM)	7,507	Norsabrina Mohd Noor (BN-UMNO)	2,069
N36	Bandar Baharu	Norsabrina Mohd. Noor (BN-UMNO)	7,884	377	Rohaizat Ja'afar (GS-PAS)	7,506	Norsabrina Mohd Noor (BN-UMNO)	2,069

== Kelantan ==
#	Constituency	Winner	Votes	Majority	Opponent(s)	Votes	Incumbent	Incumbent Majority
BN 8 | GS 37 | PH 0 | Independent 0
N1	Pengkalan Kubor	Wan Roslan Wan Hamat (GS-PAS)	10,142	1,579	Mat Razi Mat Ail (BN-UMNO)	8,563	Mat Razi Mat Ail (BN-UMNO)	2,635
N1	Pengkalan Kubor	Wan Roslan Wan Hamat (GS-PAS)	10,142	1,579	Wan Rosdi Mat Rasik (PH-PKR)	1,583	Mat Razi Mat Ail (BN-UMNO)	2,635
N2	Kelaboran	Mohd Adenan Hassan (GS-PAS)	12,422	4,929	Hashim Mohamad (BN-UMNO)	7,493	Mohamad Zaki Ibrahim (GS-PAS)	2,103
N2	Kelaboran	Mohd Adenan Hassan (GS-PAS)	12,422	4,929	Nik Faezah Nik Othman (PH-PAN)	1,970	Mohamad Zaki Ibrahim (GS-PAS)	2,103
N3	Pasir Pekan	Ahmad Yakob (GS-PAS)	14,298	8,352	Wan Mohd Sanusi Wan Yunus (BN-UMNO)	5,946	Ahmad Yakob (GS-PAS)	5,644
N3	Pasir Pekan	Ahmad Yakob (GS-PAS)	14,298	8,352	Wan Johari Wan Omar (PH-PPBM)	2,140	Ahmad Yakob (GS-PAS)	5,644
N4	Wakaf Bharu	Mohd Rusli Abdullah (GS-PAS)	10,287	387	Mohd Rosdi Ab Aziz (BN-UMNO)	9,900	Che Abdullah Mat Nawi (GS-PAS)	978
N4	Wakaf Bharu	Mohd Rusli Abdullah (GS-PAS)	10,287	387	Mohd Khir Zahari Abdul Ghani (PH-PAN)	1,999	Che Abdullah Mat Nawi (GS-PAS)	978
N5	Kijang	Izani Husin (GS-PAS)	9,998	4,717	Wan Shahrul Azwan Abd Aziz (BN-UMNO)	5,281	Wan Ubaidah Omar (GS-PAS)	5,143
N5	Kijang	Izani Husin (GS-PAS)	9,998	4,717	Nik Azmi Nik Man (PH-PKR)	1,828	Wan Ubaidah Omar (GS-PAS)	5,143
N6	Chempaka	Ahmad Fathan Mahmood (GS-PAS)	10,549	3,474	Mohd Fareez Noor Amran (BN-UMNO)	7,075	Ahmad Fathan Mahmood (GS-PAS)	6,500
N6	Chempaka	Ahmad Fathan Mahmood (GS-PAS)	10,549	3,474	Nik Omar Nik Abdul Aziz (PH-PAN)	2,418	Ahmad Fathan Mahmood (GS-PAS)	6,500
N7	Panchor	Nik Mohd. Amar Nik Abdullah (GS-PAS)	13,597	7,288	Zarina Md Eusope (BN-UMNO)	6,309	Nik Mohd Amar Nik Abdullah (GS-PAS)	5,036
N7	Panchor	Nik Mohd. Amar Nik Abdullah (GS-PAS)	13,597	7,288	Mohd Zulhazmi Hassan (PH-PAN)	2,394	Nik Mohd Amar Nik Abdullah (GS-PAS)	5,036
N8	Tanjong Mas	Rohani Ibrahim (GS-PAS)	13,154	7,015	Hafidzah Mustakim (PH-PAN)	6,139	Rohani Ibrahim (GS-PAS)	8,521
N8	Tanjong Mas	Rohani Ibrahim (GS-PAS)	13,154	7,015	Madihah Ab Aziz (BN-UMNO)	4,945	Rohani Ibrahim (GS-PAS)	8,521
N9	Kota Lama	Anuar Tan Abdullah @ Tan Teng Loon (GS-PAS)	8,410	1,445	Ab Rashid Ab Rahman (PH-PPBM)	6,965	Anuar Tan Abdullah @ Tan Teng Loon (GS-PAS)	6,618
N9	Kota Lama	Anuar Tan Abdullah @ Tan Teng Loon (GS-PAS)	8,410	1,445	Chua Hock Kuan (BN-MCA)	5,502	Anuar Tan Abdullah @ Tan Teng Loon (GS-PAS)	6,618
N9	Kota Lama	Anuar Tan Abdullah @ Tan Teng Loon (GS-PAS)	8,410	1,445	Khairul Nizam Abd Ghani (PSM)	54	Anuar Tan Abdullah @ Tan Teng Loon (GS-PAS)	6,618
N9	Kota Lama	Anuar Tan Abdullah @ Tan Teng Loon (GS-PAS)	8,410	1,445	Izat Bukhary Ismail Bukhary (IND)	29	Anuar Tan Abdullah @ Tan Teng Loon (GS-PAS)	6,618
N10	Bunut Payong	Ramli Mamat (GS-PAS)	10,921	4,627	Mohamed Hasna Che Hussin (BN-UMNO)	6,294	Ramli Mamat (GS-PAS)	5,792
N10	Bunut Payong	Ramli Mamat (GS-PAS)	10,921	4,627	Sanusi Othman (PH-PAN)	4,586	Ramli Mamat (GS-PAS)	5,792
N11	Tendong	Rozi Muhamad (GS-PAS)	8,951	2,251	Yahaya Mamat (BN-UMNO)	6,700	Rozi Muhamad (GS-PAS)	978
N11	Tendong	Rozi Muhamad (GS-PAS)	8,951	2,251	Ibrahim Ali (IND)	1,479	Rozi Muhamad (GS-PAS)	978
N11	Tendong	Rozi Muhamad (GS-PAS)	8,951	2,251	Wan Zulkhairi Wan Mad Zin (PH-PPBM)	1,360	Rozi Muhamad (GS-PAS)	978
N12	Pengkalan Pasir	Hanifa Ahmad (GS-PAS)	10,143	4,598	Che Johan Che Pa (BN-UMNO)	5,545	Hanifa Ahmad (GS-PAS)	4,715
N12	Pengkalan Pasir	Hanifa Ahmad (GS-PAS)	10,143	4,598	Sharani Mohd Naim (PH-PAN)	2,570	Hanifa Ahmad (GS-PAS)	4,715
N12	Pengkalan Pasir	Hanifa Ahmad (GS-PAS)	10,143	4,598	Suharto Mat Nasir (IND)	826	Hanifa Ahmad (GS-PAS)	4,715
N13	Meranti	Mohd. Nassuruddin Daud (GS-PAS)	10,318	6,100	Muhammad Afifi Muhammad Noor (BN-UMNO)	4,218	Mohd Nassurruddin Daud (GS-PAS)	3,933
N13	Meranti	Mohd. Nassuruddin Daud (GS-PAS)	10,318	6,100	Mohd Romizu Mohd Ali (PH-PAN)	971	Mohd Nassurruddin Daud (GS-PAS)	3,933
N13	Meranti	Mohd. Nassuruddin Daud (GS-PAS)	10,318	6,100	Che Daud Che Man (IND)	512	Mohd Nassurruddin Daud (GS-PAS)	3,933
N14	Chetok	Zuraidin Abdullah (GS-PAS)	8,701	2,657	Ahmad Anuar Hussin (BN-UMNO)	6,044	Abdul Halim Abdul Rahman (GS-PAS)	1,985
N14	Chetok	Zuraidin Abdullah (GS-PAS)	8,701	2,657	Ali Abdu Rahman Hasan (PH-PAN)	1,928	Abdul Halim Abdul Rahman (GS-PAS)	1,985
N15	Gual Periok	Mohamad Awang (GS-PAS)	8,632	2,123	Ghazali Ismail (BN-UMNO)	6,509	Mohamad Awang (GS-PAS)	615
N15	Gual Periok	Mohamad Awang (GS-PAS)	8,632	2,123	Mohd Ridzuan Muhamad (PH-PAN)	1,570	Mohamad Awang (GS-PAS)	615
N16	Apam Putra (previously known as Bukit Tuku)	Abdul Rasul Mohamed (GS-PAS)	7,134	348	Akbar Salim (BN-UMNO)	6,786	Abdul Rasul Mohamed (GS-PAS)	879
N16	Apam Putra (previously known as Bukit Tuku)	Abdul Rasul Mohamed (GS-PAS)	7,134	348	Mohd Hisyamuddin Ghazali (PH-PAN)	1,082	Abdul Rasul Mohamed (GS-PAS)	879
N17	Salor	Saiful Adli Abu Bakar (GS-PAS)	11,206	4,666	Mohamad Noordin Awang (BN-UMNO)	6,540	Husam Musa (PH-PAN)	3,683
N17	Salor	Saiful Adli Abu Bakar (GS-PAS)	11,206	4,666	Husam Musa (PH-PAN)	3,617	Husam Musa (PH-PAN)	3,683
N18	Pasir Tumboh	Abd Rahman Yunus (GS-PAS)	12,470	7,421	Bakri Yusof (BN-UMNO)	5,049	Abd Rahman Yunus (GS-PAS)	4,501
N18	Pasir Tumboh	Abd Rahman Yunus (GS-PAS)	12,470	7,421	Mohd Noor Mat Yajid (PH-PAN)	2,759	Abd Rahman Yunus (GS-PAS)	4,501
N19	Demit	Mumtaz Md. Nawi (GS-PAS)	13,621	9,068	Nurul Amal Mohd Fauzi (BN-UMNO)	4,553	Mumtaz Md Nawi (GS-PAS)	8,581
N19	Demit	Mumtaz Md. Nawi (GS-PAS)	13,621	9,068	Wan Ahmad Kamil Wan Abdullah (PH-PAN)	3,601	Mumtaz Md Nawi (GS-PAS)	8,581
N20	Tawang	Hassan Mohamood (GS-PAS)	14,991	4,583	Mohd Radzuan Abdullah (BN-UMNO)	10,408	Hassan Mohamood (GS-PAS)	3,112
N21	Pantai Irama (previously known as Perupok)	Mohd Huzaimy Che Husin (GS-PAS)	12,827	2,479	Ilias Husain (BN-UMNO)	10,348	Mohd Huzaimy Che Husin (GS-PAS)	1,488
N21	Pantai Irama (previously known as Perupok)	Mohd Huzaimy Che Husin (GS-PAS)	12,827	2,479	Ismail Ghani (PH-PAN)	1,445	Mohd Huzaimy Che Husin (GS-PAS)	1,488
N22	Jelawat	Abdul Azziz Kadir (GS-PAS)	12,463	2,495	Mohd Radzuan Hamat (BN-UMNO)	9,968	Abdul Azziz Kadir (GS-PAS)	102
N22	Jelawat	Abdul Azziz Kadir (GS-PAS)	12,463	2,495	Mohd Fami Zakaria (PH-PPBM)	1,425	Abdul Azziz Kadir (GS-PAS)	102
N23	Melor	Md Yusnan Yusof (GS-PAS)	7,820	647	Azmi Ishak (BN-UMNO)	7,173	Md Yusnan Yusof (GS-PAS)	2,489
N23	Melor	Md Yusnan Yusof (GS-PAS)	7,820	647	Abdul Aziz Abdul Kadir (PH-PKR)	2,122	Md Yusnan Yusof (GS-PAS)	2,489
N24	Kadok	Azami Mohd Nor (GS-PAS)	7,025	1,864	Mohammad Azam Ismail (BN-UMNO)	5,161	Azami Mohd Nor (GS-PAS)	3,097
N24	Kadok	Azami Mohd Nor (GS-PAS)	7,025	1,864	Che Ibrahim Mohamed (PH-PAN)	1,246	Azami Mohd Nor (GS-PAS)	3,097
N25	Kok Lanas	Md Alwi Che Ahmad (BN-UMNO)	10,921	1,122	Nik Mahadi Nik Mahmood (GS-PAS)	9,799	Md Alwi Che Ahmad (BN-UMNO)	169
N25	Kok Lanas	Md Alwi Che Ahmad (BN-UMNO)	10,921	1,122	Mohd Hanapi Ismail (PH-PAN)	1,779	Md Alwi Che Ahmad (BN-UMNO)	169
N26	Bukit Panau	Abdul Fattah Mahmood (GS-PAS)	14,506	4,291	Dayang Saniah Awang Hamid (BN-UMNO)	10,215	Abdul Fattah Mahmood (GS-PAS)	3,740
N26	Bukit Panau	Abdul Fattah Mahmood (GS-PAS)	14,506	4,291	Hisham Fauzi (PH-PAN)	2,963	Abdul Fattah Mahmood (GS-PAS)	3,740
N27	Gual Ipoh	Bakri @ Mohd Bakri Mustapha (BN-UMNO)	8,509	1,415	Wan Yusuf Wan Mustapha (GS-PAS)	7,094	Bakri @ Mohd Bakri Mustapha (BN-UMNO)	1,401
N27	Gual Ipoh	Bakri @ Mohd Bakri Mustapha (BN-UMNO)	8,509	1,415	Mohd Soba Hussin (PH-PAN)	499	Bakri @ Mohd Bakri Mustapha (BN-UMNO)	1,401
N28	Kemahang	Md. Anizam Ab. Rahman (GS-PAS)	7,261	923	Wan Rakemi Wan Zahari (BN-UMNO)	6,338	Md Anizam Ab Rahman (GS-PAS)	1,436
N28	Kemahang	Md. Anizam Ab. Rahman (GS-PAS)	7,261	923	Bahari Mohamad Nor (PH-PPBM)	737	Md Anizam Ab Rahman (GS-PAS)	1,436
N29	Selising	Tuan Saripuddin Tuan Ismail (GS-PAS)	9,640	3,120	Zulkifle Ali (BN-UMNO)	6,520	Zulkifle Ali (BN-UMNO)	107
N29	Selising	Tuan Saripuddin Tuan Ismail (GS-PAS)	9,640	3,120	Ismail Mohamad (PH-PKR)	808	Zulkifle Ali (BN-UMNO)	107
N30	Limbongan	Mohd Nazlan Mohamed Hasbullah (GS-PAS)	10,563	3,138	Mohd Hanafiah Abdul Aziz (BN-UMNO)	7,425	Mohd Nazlan Mohamed Hasbullah (GS-PAS)	1,042
N30	Limbongan	Mohd Nazlan Mohamed Hasbullah (GS-PAS)	10,563	3,138	Zarir Yaakob (PH-PAN)	1,921	Mohd Nazlan Mohamed Hasbullah (GS-PAS)	1,042
N31	Semerak	Wan Hassan Wan Ibrahim (GS-PAS)	8,278	632	Zawawi Othman (BN-UMNO)	7,646	Zawawi Othman (BN-UMNO)	985
N31	Semerak	Wan Hassan Wan Ibrahim (GS-PAS)	8,278	632	Wan Marzudi Wan Omar (PH-PPBM)	950	Zawawi Othman (BN-UMNO)	985
N32	Gaal	Mohd Rodzi Ja'afar (GS-PAS)	7,533	1,577	Mohd Kaisan Ab Rahman (BN-UMNO)	5,956	Tuan Mazlan Tuan Mat (GS-PAS)	302
N32	Gaal	Mohd Rodzi Ja'afar (GS-PAS)	7,533	1,577	Ab Rahman Yaacob (PH-PAN)	897	Tuan Mazlan Tuan Mat (GS-PAS)	302
N33	Pulai Chondong	Azhar Salleh (GS-PAS)	9,140	2,119	Ahmad Tarmizi Ismail (BN-UMNO)	7,021	Zulkifli Mamat (GS-PAS)	919
N33	Pulai Chondong	Azhar Salleh (GS-PAS)	9,140	2,119	Ab Halim @ Kamaruddin Ab Kadir (PH-PPBM)	1,328	Zulkifli Mamat (GS-PAS)	919
N34	Temangan	Mohamed Fadzli Hassan (GS-PAS)	8,711	1,897	Wan Mohd Adnan Wan Aziz (BN-UMNO)	6,814	Mohamed Fadzli Hassan (GS-PAS)	1,085
N34	Temangan	Mohamed Fadzli Hassan (GS-PAS)	8,711	1,897	Mohd Redzuan Alias (PH-PKR)	914	Mohamed Fadzli Hassan (GS-PAS)	1,085
N35	Kemuning	Mohd Roseli Ismail (GS-PAS)	9,969	1,035	Eriandi Ismail (BN-UMNO)	8,934	Mohd Roseli Ismail (GS-PAS)	1,034
N35	Kemuning	Mohd Roseli Ismail (GS-PAS)	9,969	1,035	Abdul Kadir Othman (PH-PAN)	2,163	Mohd Roseli Ismail (GS-PAS)	1,034
N36	Bukit Bunga	Mohd Adhan Kechik (BN-UMNO)	7,068	1,081	Ramzi Mohd Yusoff (GS-PAS)	5,987	Mohd Adhan Kechik (BN-UMNO)	1,533
N36	Bukit Bunga	Mohd Adhan Kechik (BN-UMNO)	7,068	1,081	Asran Alias (PH-PPBM)	659	Mohd Adhan Kechik (BN-UMNO)	1,533
N37	Ayer Lanas	Mustapa Mohamed (BN-UMNO)	7,243	359	Abdullah Ya'kub (GS-PAS)	6,884	Mustapa Mohamed (BN-UMNO)	47
N37	Ayer Lanas	Mustapa Mohamed (BN-UMNO)	7,243	359	Aminuddin Yaacob (PH-PPBM)	608	Mustapa Mohamed (BN-UMNO)	47
N38	Kuala Balah	Abd Aziz Derashid (BN-UMNO)	5,592	878	Mohd Apandi Mohamad (GS-PAS)	4,714	Abd Aziz Derashid (BN-UMNO)	2,076
N39	Mengkebang	Muhammad Mat Sulaiman (GS-PAS)	9,295	3,351	Zaki Muhammad (BN-UMNO)	5,944	Ab Latiff Ab Rahman (GS-PAS)	1,072
N39	Mengkebang	Muhammad Mat Sulaiman (GS-PAS)	9,295	3,351	Wan Mohammad Azlan Ahmad (PH-PAN)	829	Ab Latiff Ab Rahman (GS-PAS)	1,072
N40	Guchil	Hilmi Abdullah (GS-PAS)	7,564	2,279	Zuber Hassan (BN-UMNO)	5,285	Mohd Roslan Puteh (PH-PKR)	492
N40	Guchil	Hilmi Abdullah (GS-PAS)	7,564	2,279	Mohd Roslan Puteh (PH-PKR)	2,362	Mohd Roslan Puteh (PH-PKR)	492
N40	Guchil	Hilmi Abdullah (GS-PAS)	7,564	2,279	Abd Aziz Ahmad (IND)	123	Mohd Roslan Puteh (PH-PKR)	492
N41	Manek Urai	Mohd Fauzi Abdullah (GS-PAS)	8,683	3,735	Suzaini Adlina Sukri (BN-UMNO)	4,948	Mohd Fauzi Abdullah (GS-PAS)	1,633
N41	Manek Urai	Mohd Fauzi Abdullah (GS-PAS)	8,683	3,735	Mohamed Dahan Mat Jali (PH-PPBM)	503	Mohd Fauzi Abdullah (GS-PAS)	1,633
N41	Manek Urai	Mohd Fauzi Abdullah (GS-PAS)	8,683	3,735	Deraman Mamat (IND)	41	Mohd Fauzi Abdullah (GS-PAS)	1,633
N42	Dabong	Ku Mohd Zaki Ku Hussein (GS-PAS)	4,778	589	Muhammad Awang (BN-UMNO)	4,189	Ramzi Ab Rahman (BN-UMNO)	229
N42	Dabong	Ku Mohd Zaki Ku Hussein (GS-PAS)	4,778	589	Wan Ahmad Fadzil Wan Omar (PH-PPBM)	427	Ramzi Ab Rahman (BN-UMNO)	229
N43	Nenggiri	Ab Aziz Yusoff (BN-UMNO)	5,506	461	Mohd Saupi Abdul Razak (GS-PAS)	5,045	Vacant	3,849
N43	Nenggiri	Ab Aziz Yusoff (BN-UMNO)	5,506	461	Othman Yusoff (PH-PKR)	788	Vacant	3,849
N44	Paloh	Amran Arifin (BN-UMNO)	6,974	1,439	Azman Ahmad (GS-PAS)	5,535	Nozula Mat Diah (BN-UMNO)	3,937
N44	Paloh	Amran Arifin (BN-UMNO)	6,974	1,439	Noraini Hussain (PH-PKR)	417	Nozula Mat Diah (BN-UMNO)	3,937
N45	Galas	Mohd Syahbuddin Hashim (BN-UMNO)	7,281	1,378	Suhaimi Mat Deris (GS-PAS)	5,543	Ab Aziz Yusoff (BN-UMNO)	1,301
N45	Galas	Mohd Syahbuddin Hashim (BN-UMNO)	7,281	1,378	Nasir Dollah (PH-DAP)	2,973	Ab Aziz Yusoff (BN-UMNO)	1,301

== Terengganu ==
#	Constituency	Winner	Votes	Majority	Opponent(s)	Votes	Incumbent	Incumbent Majority
BN 10 | GS 22 | PH 0 | Independent 0
N1	Kuala Besut	Tengku Zaihan Che Ku Abd Rahman (BN-UMNO)	8,126	143	Azbi Salleh (GS-PAS)	7,983	Tengku Zaihan Che Ku Abd Rahman (BN-UMNO)	2,434
N1	Kuala Besut	Tengku Zaihan Che Ku Abd Rahman (BN-UMNO)	8,126	143	Che Ku Hashim Che Ku Mat (PH-PPBM)	1,095	Tengku Zaihan Che Ku Abd Rahman (BN-UMNO)	2,434
N2	Kota Putera	Mohd. Nurkhuzaini Ab. Rahman (GS-PAS)	9,704	1,181	Mohd Mahdi Musa (BN-UMNO)	8,523	Mohd Mahdi Musa (BN-UMNO)	1,412
N2	Kota Putera	Mohd. Nurkhuzaini Ab. Rahman (GS-PAS)	9,704	1,181	Tengku Roslan Tengku Othman (PH-PKR)	1,504	Mohd Mahdi Musa (BN-UMNO)	1,412
N3	Jertih	Muhammad Pehimi Yusof (BN-UMNO)	9,143	1,381	Wan Azhar Wan Ahmad (GS-PAS)	7,762	Muhammad Pehimi Yusof (BN-UMNO)	930
N3	Jertih	Muhammad Pehimi Yusof (BN-UMNO)	9,143	1,381	Kamarulzaman Wan Su (PH-PAN)	1,594	Muhammad Pehimi Yusof (BN-UMNO)	930
N4	Hulu Besut	Nawi Mohamad (BN-UMNO)	8,045	1,469	Mat Daik Mohamad (GS-PAS)	6,576	Nawi Mohamad (BN-UMNO)	1,570
N4	Hulu Besut	Nawi Mohamad (BN-UMNO)	8,045	1,469	Ismail Abdul Kadir (PH-PPBM)	860	Nawi Mohamad (BN-UMNO)	1,570
N5	Jabi	Azman Ibrahim (GS-PAS)	8,061	55	Mohd Iskandar Jaafar (BN-UMNO)	8,006	Mohd Iskandar Jaafar (BN-UMNO)	782
N5	Jabi	Azman Ibrahim (GS-PAS)	8,061	55	Abd Aziz Abas (PH-PAN)	690	Mohd Iskandar Jaafar (BN-UMNO)	782
N6	Permaisuri	Abd Halim Jusoh (BN-UMNO)	10,385	1,970	Zul Bhari A. Rahman (GS-PAS)	8,415	Mohd Jidin Shafee (BN-UMNO)	2,928
N6	Permaisuri	Abd Halim Jusoh (BN-UMNO)	10,385	1,970	Wan Mokhtar Wan Ibrahim (PH-PKR)	853	Mohd Jidin Shafee (BN-UMNO)	2,928
N7	Langkap	Sabri Mohd Noor (BN-UMNO)	9,007	3,446	Azmi Maarof (GS-PAS)	5,561	Sabri Mohd Noor (BN-UMNO)	3,022
N7	Langkap	Sabri Mohd Noor (BN-UMNO)	9,007	3,446	Mustaffa Abdullah (PH-PPBM)	583	Sabri Mohd Noor (BN-UMNO)	3,022
N8	Batu Rakit	Bazlan Abd Rahman (BN-UMNO)	10,046	299	Mohd Shafizi Ismail (GS-PAS)	9,747	Bazlan Abd Rahman (BN-UMNO)	1,635
N8	Batu Rakit	Bazlan Abd Rahman (BN-UMNO)	10,046	299	Amir Long (PH-PPBM)	800	Bazlan Abd Rahman (BN-UMNO)	1,635
N9	Tepuh	Hishamuddin Abdul Karim (GS-PAS)	10,782	2,717	Basir Ismail (BN-UMNO)	8,065	Hishamuddin Abdul Karim (GS-PAS)	229
N9	Tepuh	Hishamuddin Abdul Karim (GS-PAS)	10,782	2,717	Wan Hafizie Suzlie Wan Hassan (PH-PPBM)	1,002	Hishamuddin Abdul Karim (GS-PAS)	229
N10	Buluh Gading (previously known as Teluk Pasu)	Ridzuan Hashim (GS-PAS)	11,580	4,567	Che Mansor Salleh (BN-UMNO)	7,013	Ridzuan Hashim (GS-PAS)	109
N10	Buluh Gading (previously known as Teluk Pasu)	Ridzuan Hashim (GS-PAS)	11,580	4,567	Azik Chik (PH-PAN)	894	Ridzuan Hashim (GS-PAS)	109
N11	Seberang Takir	Ahmad Razif Abd Rahman (BN-UMNO)	9,340	1,884	Mohd Fazil Wahab (GS-PAS)	7,456	Ahmad Razif Abd Rahman (BN-UMNO)	1,510
N11	Seberang Takir	Ahmad Razif Abd Rahman (BN-UMNO)	9,340	1,884	Abu Bakar Abdullah (PH-PKR)	939	Ahmad Razif Abd Rahman (BN-UMNO)	1,510
N12	Bukit Tunggal	Alias Razak (GS-PAS)	8,308	2,344	Tuan Arif Shahibu Fadillah Tuan Ahmad (BN-UMNO)	5,964	Alias Razak (GS-PAS)	652
N12	Bukit Tunggal	Alias Razak (GS-PAS)	8,308	2,344	Fatimah Lailati Omar (PH-PKR)	721	Alias Razak (GS-PAS)	652
N13	Wakaf Mempelam	Wan Sukairi Wan Abdullah (GS-PAS)	14,796	7,378	Salleh Othman (BN-UMNO)	7,418	Mohd Abdul Wahid Endut (GS-PAS)	2,986
N13	Wakaf Mempelam	Wan Sukairi Wan Abdullah (GS-PAS)	14,796	7,378	Zubir Mohamed (PH-PAN)	1,589	Mohd Abdul Wahid Endut (GS-PAS)	2,986
N14	Bandar	Ahmad Shah Muhamed (GS-PAS)	7,133	2,091	Toh Seng Cheng (BN-MCA)	5,042	Azan Ismail (PH-PKR)	2,159
N14	Bandar	Ahmad Shah Muhamed (GS-PAS)	7,133	2,091	Azan Ismail (PH-PKR)	3,996	Azan Ismail (PH-PKR)	2,159
N15	Ladang	Tengku Hassan Tengku Omar (GS-PAS)	8,201	363	Mohd Sabri Alwi (BN-UMNO)	7,838	Tengku Hassan Tengku Omar (GS-PAS)	924
N15	Ladang	Tengku Hassan Tengku Omar (GS-PAS)	8,201	363	Zulkifli Mohamad (PH-PPBM)	2,836	Tengku Hassan Tengku Omar (GS-PAS)	924
N16	Batu Buruk	Muhammad Khalil Abdul Hadi (GS-PAS)	15,184	5,288	Zamri Awang Hitam (BN-UMNO)	9,896	Syed Azman Syed Ahmad Nawawi (GS-PAS)	2,273
N16	Batu Buruk	Muhammad Khalil Abdul Hadi (GS-PAS)	15,184	5,288	Raja Kamarul Bahrin Shah Raja Ahmad (PH-PAN)	2,572	Syed Azman Syed Ahmad Nawawi (GS-PAS)	2,273
N17	Alur Limbat	Ariffin Deraman (GS-PAS)	13,330	4,194	Saiful Bahri Baharuddin (BN-UMNO)	9,136	Ariffin Deraman (GS-PAS)	645
N17	Alur Limbat	Ariffin Deraman (GS-PAS)	13,330	4,194	Ahmad Sabri Ali (PH-PKR)	1,492	Ariffin Deraman (GS-PAS)	645
N18	Bukit Payung	Mohd. Nor Hamzah (GS-PAS)	11,672	4,488	Zaitun Mat Amin (BN-UMNO)	7,184	Mohd. Nor Hamzah (GS-PAS)	613
N18	Bukit Payung	Mohd. Nor Hamzah (GS-PAS)	11,672	4,488	Mohd Dalizan Abd Aziz (PH-PAN)	1,004	Mohd. Nor Hamzah (GS-PAS)	613
N19	Ru Rendang	Ahmad Samsuri Mokhtar (GS-PAS)	13,851	6,028	Nik Dir Nik Wan Ku (BN-UMNO)	7,823	Abd Hadi Awang (GS-PAS)	2,819
N19	Ru Rendang	Ahmad Samsuri Mokhtar (GS-PAS)	13,851	6,028	Zarawi Sulong (PH-PAN)	729	Abd Hadi Awang (GS-PAS)	2,819
N20	Pengkalan Berangan	Sulaiman Sulong (GS-PAS)	11,896	490	A. Latiff Awang (BN-UMNO)	11,406	A. Latiff Awang (BN-UMNO)	1,848
N20	Pengkalan Berangan	Sulaiman Sulong (GS-PAS)	11,896	490	Aidi Ahmad (PH-PPBM)	1,145	A. Latiff Awang (BN-UMNO)	1,848
N21	Telemung	Rozi Mamat (BN-UMNO)	9,407	4,159	Kamaruzaman Abdullah (GS-PAS)	5,248	Rozi Mamat (BN-UMNO)	6,864
N21	Telemung	Rozi Mamat (BN-UMNO)	9,407	4,159	Sharifah Norhayati Syed Omar (PH-PKR)	455	Rozi Mamat (BN-UMNO)	6,864
N22	Manir	Hilmi Harun (GS-PAS)	8,716	2,844	Yusof Awang Hitam (BN-UMNO)	5,872	Hilmi Harun (GS-PAS)	588
N22	Manir	Hilmi Harun (GS-PAS)	8,716	2,844	Mohd Hafizuddin Hussin (PH-PAN)	422	Hilmi Harun (GS-PAS)	588
N23	Kuala Berang	Mamad Puteh (GS-PAS)	7,707	1,070	T. Putera T. Awang (BN-UMNO)	6,637	T. Putera T. Awang (BN-UMNO)	449
N23	Kuala Berang	Mamad Puteh (GS-PAS)	7,707	1,070	Mohd Nor Othman (PH-PKR)	969	T. Putera T. Awang (BN-UMNO)	449
N24	Ajil	Maliaman Kassim (GS-PAS)	8,132	4	Ghazali Taib (BN-UMNO)	8,128	Ghazali Taib (BN-UMNO)	2,782
N24	Ajil	Maliaman Kassim (GS-PAS)	8,132	4	Zamani Mamat (PH-PPBM)	679	Ghazali Taib (BN-UMNO)	2,782
N25	Bukit Besi	Roslee Daud (BN-UMNO)	5,770	46	Ghazali Sulaiman (GS-PAS)	5,724	Roslee Daud (BN-UMNO)	2,558
N25	Bukit Besi	Roslee Daud (BN-UMNO)	5,770	46	Mohamad Arif Arifin (PH-PPBM)	487	Roslee Daud (BN-UMNO)	2,558
N26	Rantau Abang	Alias Harun (GS-PAS)	12,287	4,452	Wan Zulkafli Wan Gati (BN-UMNO)	7,835	Alias Harun (GS-PAS)	141
N26	Rantau Abang	Alias Harun (GS-PAS)	12,287	4,452	Mohammad Padeli Jusoh (PH-PKR)	939	Alias Harun (GS-PAS)	141
N27	Sura	Wan Hapandi Wan Nik (GS-PAS)	12,500	7,162	Zainun Abu Bakar (BN-UMNO)	5,338	Wan Hapandi Wan Nik (GS-PAS)	2,957
N27	Sura	Wan Hapandi Wan Nik (GS-PAS)	12,500	7,162	Zulkifli Ali (PH-PAN)	2,386	Wan Hapandi Wan Nik (GS-PAS)	2,957
N28	Paka	Satiful Bahri Mamat (GS-PAS)	11,853	3,405	Tengku Hamzah Tengku Deraman (BN-UMNO)	8,448	Satiful Bahri Mamat (GS-PAS)	1,287
N28	Paka	Satiful Bahri Mamat (GS-PAS)	11,853	3,405	Mohd Hasbie Muda (PH-PAN)	1,866	Satiful Bahri Mamat (GS-PAS)	1,287
N29	Kemasik	Saiful Azmi Suhaili (GS-PAS)	9,645	2,164	Rosli Othman (BN-UMNO)	7,481	Rosli Othman (BN-UMNO)	898
N29	Kemasik	Saiful Azmi Suhaili (GS-PAS)	9,645	2,164	Rizan Ali (PH-PAN)	1,557	Rosli Othman (BN-UMNO)	898
N30	Kijal	Ahmad Said (BN-UMNO)	9,545	1,265	Hazri Jusoh (GS-PAS)	8,280	Ahmad Said (BN-UMNO)	4,204
N30	Kijal	Ahmad Said (BN-UMNO)	9,545	1,265	Wan Marzuki Wan Sembok (PH-PPBM)	1,472	Ahmad Said (BN-UMNO)	4,204
N31	Cukai	Hanafiah Mat (GS-PAS)	12,428	4,881	Mohamed Awang Tera (BN-UMNO)	7,547	Hanafiah Mat (GS-PAS)	2,446
N31	Cukai	Hanafiah Mat (GS-PAS)	12,428	4,881	Husain Safri Muhammad (PH-PKR)	5,104	Hanafiah Mat (GS-PAS)	2,446
N32	Air Putih	Ab Razak Ibrahim (GS-PAS)	12,985	746	Wan Abdul Hakim Wan Mokhtar (BN-UMNO)	12,239	Wan Abdul Hakim Wan Mokhtar (BN-UMNO)	3,633
N32	Air Putih	Ab Razak Ibrahim (GS-PAS)	12,985	746	Mohd Zukri Aksah (PH-PKR)	2,195	Wan Abdul Hakim Wan Mokhtar (BN-UMNO)	3,633

== Penang ==
#	Constituency	Winner	Votes	Majority	Opponent(s)	Votes	Incumbent	Incumbent Majority
BN 2 | GS 1 | PH 37 | Independent 0
N1	Penaga	Mohd Yusni Mat Piah (GS-PAS)	8,530	1,132	Mohd Zain Ahmad (BN-UMNO)	7,398	Mohd Zain Ahmad (BN-UMNO)	1,662
N2	Bertam	Khaliq Mehtab Mohd Ishaq (PH-PPBM)	6,485	217	Shariful Azhar Othman (BN-UMNO)	6,268	Shariful Azhar Othman (BN-UMNO)	1,642
N2	Bertam	Khaliq Mehtab Mohd Ishaq (PH-PPBM)	6,485	217	Moktar Ramly (GS-PAS)	2,986	Shariful Azhar Othman (BN-UMNO)	1,642
N3	Pinang Tunggal	Ahmad Zakiyuddin Abd Rahman (PH-PKR)	7,754	127	Roslan Saidin (BN-UMNO)	7,627	Roslan Saidin (BN-UMNO)	1,587
N3	Pinang Tunggal	Ahmad Zakiyuddin Abd Rahman (PH-PKR)	7,754	127	Bukhori Ghazali (GS-PAS)	4,622	Roslan Saidin (BN-UMNO)	1,587
N4	Permatang Berangan	Nor Hafizah Othman (BN-UMNO)	6,870	646	Mohd Sobri Saleh (GS-PAS)	6,224	Omar Haji Abd Hamid (BN-UMNO)	1,621
N4	Permatang Berangan	Nor Hafizah Othman (BN-UMNO)	6,870	646	Mohd Shariff Omar (PH-PPBM)	5,021	Omar Haji Abd Hamid (BN-UMNO)	1,621
N4	Permatang Berangan	Nor Hafizah Othman (BN-UMNO)	6,870	646	Azman Shah Othman (PRM)	24	Omar Haji Abd Hamid (BN-UMNO)	1,621
N5	Sungai Dua	Muhamad Yusoff Mohd Noor (BN-UMNO)	7,314	1,934	Zahadi Mohd (GS-PAS)	5,380	Muhamad Yusoff Mohd Noor (BN-UMNO)	357
N5	Sungai Dua	Muhamad Yusoff Mohd Noor (BN-UMNO)	7,314	1,934	Yusri Isahak (PH-PAN)	5,115	Muhamad Yusoff Mohd Noor (BN-UMNO)	357
N6	Telok Ayer Tawar	Mustafa Kamal Ahmad (PH-PKR)	7,072	2,203	Zamri Che Ros (BN-UMNO)	4,869	Jahara Hamid (BN-UMNO)	840
N6	Telok Ayer Tawar	Mustafa Kamal Ahmad (PH-PKR)	7,072	2,203	Mohamad Hanif Haron (GS-PAS)	3,900	Jahara Hamid (BN-UMNO)	840
N6	Telok Ayer Tawar	Mustafa Kamal Ahmad (PH-PKR)	7,072	2,203	Lee Thian Hong (PRM)	88	Jahara Hamid (BN-UMNO)	840
N7	Sungai Puyu	Phee Boon Poh (PH-DAP)	21,705	19,569	Lim Hai Song (BN-MCA)	2,136	Phee Boon Poh (PH-DAP)	16,207
N7	Sungai Puyu	Phee Boon Poh (PH-DAP)	21,705	19,569	Tan Lay Hock (PRM)	101	Phee Boon Poh (PH-DAP)	16,207
N7	Sungai Puyu	Phee Boon Poh (PH-DAP)	21,705	19,569	Neoh Bok Keng (MUP)	79	Phee Boon Poh (PH-DAP)	16,207
N7	Sungai Puyu	Phee Boon Poh (PH-DAP)	21,705	19,569	Ong Yin Yin (PFP)	51	Phee Boon Poh (PH-DAP)	16,207
N8	Bagan Jermal	Soon Lip Chee (PH-DAP)	18,134	15,236	Ang Chor Keong (BN-MCA)	2,898	Lim Hock Seng (PH-DAP)	11,855
N8	Bagan Jermal	Soon Lip Chee (PH-DAP)	18,134	15,236	Hari Devydrai (MUP)	106	Lim Hock Seng (PH-DAP)	11,855
N8	Bagan Jermal	Soon Lip Chee (PH-DAP)	18,134	15,236	Teoh Chai Deng (PRM)	74	Lim Hock Seng (PH-DAP)	11,855
N8	Bagan Jermal	Soon Lip Chee (PH-DAP)	18,134	15,236	Fabian George Albart (PFP)	30	Lim Hock Seng (PH-DAP)	11,855
N9	Bagan Dalam	Satees Muniandy (PH-DAP)	10,701	6,783	Dhinagaran Jayabalan (BN-MIC)	3,918	Tanasekharan Autherapady (PH-DAP)	5,161
N9	Bagan Dalam	Satees Muniandy (PH-DAP)	10,701	6,783	Teoh Uat Lye (MUP)	51	Tanasekharan Autherapady (PH-DAP)	5,161
N9	Bagan Dalam	Satees Muniandy (PH-DAP)	10,701	6,783	Teoh Huck Ping (PRM)	45	Tanasekharan Autherapady (PH-DAP)	5,161
N9	Bagan Dalam	Satees Muniandy (PH-DAP)	10,701	6,783	Jasper Ooi Zong Han (PFP)	36	Tanasekharan Autherapady (PH-DAP)	5,161
N10	Seberang Jaya	Afif Bahardin (PH-PKR)	16,014	7,421	Abu Bakar Sidekh Zainul Abidin (BN-UMNO)	8,593	Afif Bahardin (PH-PKR)	2,459
N10	Seberang Jaya	Afif Bahardin (PH-PKR)	16,014	7,421	Ahmad Rafaei Rashid (GS-PAS)	5,540	Afif Bahardin (PH-PKR)	2,459
N11	Permatang Pasir	Muhammad Faiz Fadzil (PH-PAN)	9,708	2,981	Muhammad Fauzi Yusoff (GS-PAS)	6,727	Mohd Salleh Man (GS-PAS)	6,826
N11	Permatang Pasir	Muhammad Faiz Fadzil (PH-PAN)	9,708	2,981	Anuar Faisal Yahaya (BN-UMNO)	4,979	Mohd Salleh Man (GS-PAS)	6,826
N12	Penanti	Norlela Ariffin (PH-PKR)	8,221	2,944	Suhaimi Sabudin (BN-UMNO)	5,277	Norlela Ariffin (PH-PKR)	2,339
N12	Penanti	Norlela Ariffin (PH-PKR)	8,221	2,944	Fawwaz Mohamad Jan (GS-PAS)	4,791	Norlela Ariffin (PH-PKR)	2,339
N13	Berapit	Heng Lee Lee (PH-DAP)	18,378	16,981	Goh Swee Gim (BN-MCA)	1,397	Ong Kok Fooi (PH-DAP)	14,765
N13	Berapit	Heng Lee Lee (PH-DAP)	18,378	16,981	Lee Poh Kong (PFP)	105	Ong Kok Fooi (PH-DAP)	14,765
N13	Berapit	Heng Lee Lee (PH-DAP)	18,378	16,981	Song Chee Meng (PRM)	84	Ong Kok Fooi (PH-DAP)	14,765
N14	Machang Bubok	Lee Khai Loon (PH-PKR)	21,819	16,747	Md Jamil Abd Rahman (GS-PAS)	5,072	Lee Khai Loon (PH-PKR)	11,900
N14	Machang Bubok	Lee Khai Loon (PH-PKR)	21,819	16,747	Tan Teik Cheng (BN-MCA)	4,658	Lee Khai Loon (PH-PKR)	11,900
N14	Machang Bubok	Lee Khai Loon (PH-PKR)	21,819	16,747	Tang Ah Ba (PRM)	53	Lee Khai Loon (PH-PKR)	11,900
N14	Machang Bubok	Lee Khai Loon (PH-PKR)	21,819	16,747	Lim Jhun Hou (MUP)	28	Lee Khai Loon (PH-PKR)	11,900
N15	Padang Lalang	Chong Eng (PH-DAP)	20,764	18,364	Kuan Hin Yeep (BN-MCA)	2,400	Chong Eng (PH-DAP)	14,930
N15	Padang Lalang	Chong Eng (PH-DAP)	20,764	18,364	Lai Yean Nee (PRM)	154	Chong Eng (PH-DAP)	14,930
N15	Padang Lalang	Chong Eng (PH-DAP)	20,764	18,364	Liew Ee Jin (PFP)	101	Chong Eng (PH-DAP)	14,930
N16	Perai	Ramasamy Palanisamy (PH-DAP)	11,243	9,049	Suresh Muniandy (BN-MIC)	2,194	Ramasamy Palanisamy (PH-DAP)	7,959
N16	Perai	Ramasamy Palanisamy (PH-DAP)	11,243	9,049	Patrick Ooi Khar Giap (PFP)	104	Ramasamy Palanisamy (PH-DAP)	7,959
N16	Perai	Ramasamy Palanisamy (PH-DAP)	11,243	9,049	Samuganathan Muniandy (PRM)	37	Ramasamy Palanisamy (PH-DAP)	7,959
N16	Perai	Ramasamy Palanisamy (PH-DAP)	11,243	9,049	Asoghan Govindaraju (PAP)	33	Ramasamy Palanisamy (PH-DAP)	7,959
N16	Perai	Ramasamy Palanisamy (PH-DAP)	11,243	9,049	Isumary Retnam (IND)	23	Ramasamy Palanisamy (PH-DAP)	7,959
N17	Bukit Tengah	Gooi Hsiao-Leung (PH-PKR)	12,535	8,558	Thor Teong Gee (BN-GERAKAN)	3,977	Ong Chin Wen (PH-PKR)	5,190
N17	Bukit Tengah	Gooi Hsiao-Leung (PH-PKR)	12,535	8,558	Norazman Ishak (GS-PAS)	2,355	Ong Chin Wen (PH-PKR)	5,190
N17	Bukit Tengah	Gooi Hsiao-Leung (PH-PKR)	12,535	8,558	Tan Hiang Lye (PRM)	53	Ong Chin Wen (PH-PKR)	5,190
N17	Bukit Tengah	Gooi Hsiao-Leung (PH-PKR)	12,535	8,558	Joseph Edward (PFP)	27	Ong Chin Wen (PH-PKR)	5,190
N18	Bukit Tambun	Goh Choon Aik (PH-PKR)	18,064	14,880	Hartini Tan Abdullah (BN-GERAKAN)	3,184	Law Choo Kiang (PH-PKR)	11,020
N18	Bukit Tambun	Goh Choon Aik (PH-PKR)	18,064	14,880	Kumaravelu Arumugam (GS-PAS)	735	Law Choo Kiang (PH-PKR)	11,020
N18	Bukit Tambun	Goh Choon Aik (PH-PKR)	18,064	14,880	Goh Bee Koon (PRM)	117	Law Choo Kiang (PH-PKR)	11,020
N18	Bukit Tambun	Goh Choon Aik (PH-PKR)	18,064	14,880	Ong Seong Lu (PFP)	54	Law Choo Kiang (PH-PKR)	11,020
N19	Jawi	H’ng Mooi Lye (PH-DAP)	17,559	13,371	Kiew Hen Chong (BN-GERAKAN)	4,188	Soon Lip Chee (PH-DAP)	9,076
N19	Jawi	H’ng Mooi Lye (PH-DAP)	17,559	13,371	Tan Beng Huat (PAP)	309	Soon Lip Chee (PH-DAP)	9,076
N19	Jawi	H’ng Mooi Lye (PH-DAP)	17,559	13,371	Koay Xing Boon (MUP)	165	Soon Lip Chee (PH-DAP)	9,076
N19	Jawi	H’ng Mooi Lye (PH-DAP)	17,559	13,371	Daphne Edward (PFP)	73	Soon Lip Chee (PH-DAP)	9,076
N19	Jawi	H’ng Mooi Lye (PH-DAP)	17,559	13,371	Tan Chew Suan (PRM)	51	Soon Lip Chee (PH-DAP)	9,076
N20	Sungai Bakap	Amar Pritpal Abdullah (PH-PKR)	10,386	2,348	Mohamed Sani Bakar (BN-UMNO)	8,038	Maktar Shapee (PH-PKR)	1,805
N20	Sungai Bakap	Amar Pritpal Abdullah (PH-PKR)	10,386	2,348	Osman Jaafar (GS-PAS)	4,316	Maktar Shapee (PH-PKR)	1,805
N20	Sungai Bakap	Amar Pritpal Abdullah (PH-PKR)	10,386	2,348	Tan Joon Long @ Tan Chow Kang (PRM)	55	Maktar Shapee (PH-PKR)	1,805
N21	Sungai Acheh	Zulkifli Ibrahim (PH-PKR)	7,486	416	Mahmud Zakaria (BN-UMNO)	7,070	Mahmud Zakaria (BN-UMNO)	808
N21	Sungai Acheh	Zulkifli Ibrahim (PH-PKR)	7,486	416	Nor Zamri Latiff (GS-PAS)	2,383	Mahmud Zakaria (BN-UMNO)	808
N22	Tanjung Bungah	Zairil Khir Johari (PH-DAP)	13,245	9,343	Teng Chang Yeow (BN-GERAKAN)	3,902	Teh Yee Cheu (PH-DAP)	5,515
N22	Tanjung Bungah	Zairil Khir Johari (PH-DAP)	13,245	9,343	Chua Cheong Wee (PRM)	122	Teh Yee Cheu (PH-DAP)	5,515
N22	Tanjung Bungah	Zairil Khir Johari (PH-DAP)	13,245	9,343	Lee Zheng Yong (MUP)	74	Teh Yee Cheu (PH-DAP)	5,515
N23	Air Putih	Lim Guan Eng (PH-DAP)	9,362	7,958	Tang Heap Seng (BN-MCA)	1,404	Lim Guan Eng (PH-DAP)	7,744
N23	Air Putih	Lim Guan Eng (PH-DAP)	9,362	7,958	Tan Gim Theam (MUP)	87	Lim Guan Eng (PH-DAP)	7,744
N23	Air Putih	Lim Guan Eng (PH-DAP)	9,362	7,958	Manikandan Ramayah (PCM)	83	Lim Guan Eng (PH-DAP)	7,744
N24	Kebun Bunga	Jason Ong Khan Lee (PH-PKR)	14,851	12,597	Ooi Zhi Yi (BN-GERAKAN)	2,254	Cheah Kah Peng (PH-PKR)	9,030
N24	Kebun Bunga	Jason Ong Khan Lee (PH-PKR)	14,851	12,597	Wu Kai Min (MUP)	110	Cheah Kah Peng (PH-PKR)	9,030
N25	Pulau Tikus	Chris Lee Chun Kit (PH-DAP)	11,679	9,245	Loo Jieh Sheng (BN-GERAKAN)	2,434	Yap Soo Huey (PH-DAP)	8,220
N25	Pulau Tikus	Chris Lee Chun Kit (PH-DAP)	11,679	9,245	Wee Kean Wai (MUP)	75	Yap Soo Huey (PH-DAP)	8,220
N26	Padang Kota	Chow Kon Yeow (PH-DAP)	9,278	7,808	H'ng Khoon Leng (BN-GERAKAN)	1,470	Chow Kon Yeow (PH-DAP)	7,196
N26	Padang Kota	Chow Kon Yeow (PH-DAP)	9,278	7,808	Goh Saik Wei (MUP)	71	Chow Kon Yeow (PH-DAP)	7,196
N27	Pengkalan Kota	Gooi Zi Sen (PH-DAP)	15,037	13,390	Lim Swee Bok (BN-MCA)	1,647	Lau Keng Ee (PH-DAP)	13,600
N27	Pengkalan Kota	Gooi Zi Sen (PH-DAP)	15,037	13,390	Ragindran Sivasamy (IND)	87	Lau Keng Ee (PH-DAP)	13,600
N27	Pengkalan Kota	Gooi Zi Sen (PH-DAP)	15,037	13,390	Koay Teng Lye (MUP)	82	Lau Keng Ee (PH-DAP)	13,600
N27	Pengkalan Kota	Gooi Zi Sen (PH-DAP)	15,037	13,390	Chew Seng Tung (PRM)	68	Lau Keng Ee (PH-DAP)	13,600
N28	Komtar	Teh Lai Heng (PH-DAP)	10,113	8,363	Tan Hing Teik (BN-MCA)	1,750	Teh Lai Heng (PH-DAP)	8,114
N28	Komtar	Teh Lai Heng (PH-DAP)	10,113	8,363	Ong Chun Jiet (MUP)	85	Teh Lai Heng (PH-DAP)	8,114
N29	Datuk Keramat	Jagdeep Singh Deo (PH-DAP)	13,712	9,561	Lee Boon Ten (BN-GERAKAN)	4,151	Jagdeep Singh Deo (PH-DAP)	5,020
N29	Datuk Keramat	Jagdeep Singh Deo (PH-DAP)	13,712	9,561	Lim Boo Chang (MUP)	194	Jagdeep Singh Deo (PH-DAP)	5,020
N29	Datuk Keramat	Jagdeep Singh Deo (PH-DAP)	13,712	9,561	Muhammad Majnun Abdul Wahab (IND)	146	Jagdeep Singh Deo (PH-DAP)	5,020
N29	Datuk Keramat	Jagdeep Singh Deo (PH-DAP)	13,712	9,561	Nicholas Diane Morgan (PFP)	18	Jagdeep Singh Deo (PH-DAP)	5,020
N30	Sungai Pinang	Lim Siew Khim (PH-DAP)	15,362	10,388	Ng Fook On (BN-GERAKAN)	4,974	Lim Siew Khim (PH-DAP)	4,704
N30	Sungai Pinang	Lim Siew Khim (PH-DAP)	15,362	10,388	Yacoob Omar (GS-PAS)	1,575	Lim Siew Khim (PH-DAP)	4,704
N30	Sungai Pinang	Lim Siew Khim (PH-DAP)	15,362	10,388	Teh Yee Cheu (PSM)	223	Lim Siew Khim (PH-DAP)	4,704
N30	Sungai Pinang	Lim Siew Khim (PH-DAP)	15,362	10,388	Mohamed Yacoob Mohamed Noor (IND)	119	Lim Siew Khim (PH-DAP)	4,704
N30	Sungai Pinang	Lim Siew Khim (PH-DAP)	15,362	10,388	Tan Sim Bee (MUP)	79	Lim Siew Khim (PH-DAP)	4,704
N31	Batu Lancang	Ong Ah Teong (PH-DAP)	20,615	18,208	Koo Pei Chee (BN-GERAKAN)	2,407	Law Heng Kiang (PH-DAP)	15,364
N31	Batu Lancang	Ong Ah Teong (PH-DAP)	20,615	18,208	Kee Lean Ee (MUP)	139	Law Heng Kiang (PH-DAP)	15,364
N32	Seri Delima	Syerleena Abdul Rashid (PH-DAP)	16,553	13,211	Khoo Kay Teong (BN-MCA)	3,342	Sanisvara Nethaji Rayer Rajaji (PH-DAP)	9,277
N32	Seri Delima	Syerleena Abdul Rashid (PH-DAP)	16,553	13,211	Tan Yang Yung (MUP)	159	Sanisvara Nethaji Rayer Rajaji (PH-DAP)	9,277
N33	Air Itam	Joseph Ng Soon Siang (PH-DAP)	12,588	9,541	Tan Kah Leong (BN-GERAKAN)	3,047	Wong Hon Wai (PH-DAP)	7,316
N33	Air Itam	Joseph Ng Soon Siang (PH-DAP)	12,588	9,541	Kang Teik Woi (MUP)	148	Wong Hon Wai (PH-DAP)	7,316
N34	Paya Terubong	Yeoh Soon Hin (PH-DAP)	35,315	31,189	Wong Chin Chong (BN-MCA)	4,126	Yeoh Soon Hin (PH-DAP)	25,719
N34	Paya Terubong	Yeoh Soon Hin (PH-DAP)	35,315	31,189	Kuan Aun Wan (MUP)	421	Yeoh Soon Hin (PH-DAP)	25,719
N35	Batu Uban	Kumaresan Aramugam (PH-PKR)	21,079	17,273	Hng Chee Wey (BN-GERAKAN)	3,806	Jayabalan A. Thambyappa (PH-PKR)	9,857
N35	Batu Uban	Kumaresan Aramugam (PH-PKR)	21,079	17,273	Vikneswaran Muniandy (GS-PAS)	1,176	Jayabalan A. Thambyappa (PH-PKR)	9,857
N35	Batu Uban	Kumaresan Aramugam (PH-PKR)	21,079	17,273	Teoh Kok Siang (MUP)	116	Jayabalan A. Thambyappa (PH-PKR)	9,857
N35	Batu Uban	Kumaresan Aramugam (PH-PKR)	21,079	17,273	Teoh Kean Liang (PFP)	32	Jayabalan A. Thambyappa (PH-PKR)	9,857
N36	Pantai Jerejak	Saifuddin Nasution Ismail (PH-PKR)	14,014	10,716	Oh Tong Keong (BN-GERAKAN)	3,298	Mohd Rashid Hasnon (PH-PKR)	5,354
N36	Pantai Jerejak	Saifuddin Nasution Ismail (PH-PKR)	14,014	10,716	Mohd Farhan Yusri (GS-PAS)	1,670	Mohd Rashid Hasnon (PH-PKR)	5,354
N36	Pantai Jerejak	Saifuddin Nasution Ismail (PH-PKR)	14,014	10,716	Yim Boon Leong (MUP)	97	Mohd Rashid Hasnon (PH-PKR)	5,354
N37	Batu Maung	Abdul Halim Hussain (PH-PKR)	17,380	8,317	Liakat Ali Mohamed Ali (BN-UMNO)	9,063	Abdul Malik Abdul Kassim (PH-PKR)	3,390
N37	Batu Maung	Abdul Halim Hussain (PH-PKR)	17,380	8,317	Saiful Lizan Md Yusuf (GS-PAS)	3,153	Abdul Malik Abdul Kassim (PH-PKR)	3,390
N38	Bayan Lepas	Azrul Mahathir Aziz (PH-PAN)	12,504	5,245	Rusli Hashim (BN-UMNO)	7,259	Nordin Ahmad (BN-UMNO)	458
N38	Bayan Lepas	Azrul Mahathir Aziz (PH-PAN)	12,504	5,245	Zarina Shinta Madar (GS-PAS)	2,497	Nordin Ahmad (BN-UMNO)	458
N39	Pulau Betong	Mohd Tuah Ismail (PH-PKR)	7,675	1,596	Muhammad Farid Saad (BN-UMNO)	6,079	Muhammad Farid Saad (BN-UMNO)	395
N39	Pulau Betong	Mohd Tuah Ismail (PH-PKR)	7,675	1,596	Muhd Taufik Hashim (GS-PAS)	1,645	Muhammad Farid Saad (BN-UMNO)	395
N39	Pulau Betong	Mohd Tuah Ismail (PH-PKR)	7,675	1,596	Yeoh Cheng Huat (PRM)	64	Muhammad Farid Saad (BN-UMNO)	395
N40	Telok Bahang	Zolkifly Mohd Lazim (PH-PPBM)	5,482	425	Shah Haedan Ayoob Hussain Shah (BN-UMNO)	5,057	Shah Haedan Ayoob Hussain Shah (BN-UMNO)	801
N40	Telok Bahang	Zolkifly Mohd Lazim (PH-PPBM)	5,482	425	Mohd Ali Othman (GS-PAS)	1,469	Shah Haedan Ayoob Hussain Shah (BN-UMNO)	801

== Perak ==
#	Constituency	Winner	Votes	Majority	Opponent(s)	Votes	Incumbent	Incumbent Majority
BN 27 | GS 3 | PH 29 | Independent 0
N1	Pengkalan Hulu	Aznel Ibrahim (BN-UMNO)	5,716	2,375	Mohd Hamidi Ismail (GS-PAS)	3,341	Aznel Ibrahim (BN-UMNO)	3,361
N1	Pengkalan Hulu	Aznel Ibrahim (BN-UMNO)	5,716	2,375	Ahmad Safwan Mohamad (PH-PPBM)	2,711	Aznel Ibrahim (BN-UMNO)	3,361
N2	Temenggor	Salbiah Mohamed (BN-UMNO)	7,823	3,935	Md Pozi Md Sani (GS-PAS)	3,888	Salbiah Mohamed (BN-UMNO)	3,215
N2	Temenggor	Salbiah Mohamed (BN-UMNO)	7,823	3,935	Mohd Fadzil Abd Aziz (PH-PPBM)	3,806	Salbiah Mohamed (BN-UMNO)	3,215
N3	Kenering	Mohd Tarmizi Idris (BN-UMNO)	7,379	3,268	Azhar Rasdi (GS-PAS)	4,111	Mohd Tarmizi Idris (BN-UMNO)	3,335
N3	Kenering	Mohd Tarmizi Idris (BN-UMNO)	7,379	3,268	Noor Sham Abu Samah (PH-PKR)	1,832	Mohd Tarmizi Idris (BN-UMNO)	3,335
N4	Kota Tampan	Saarani Mohamad (BN-UMNO)	5,183	2,302	Muhamad Rifa'at Razman (GS-PAS)	2,881	Saarani Mohamad (BN-UMNO)	1,844
N4	Kota Tampan	Saarani Mohamad (BN-UMNO)	5,183	2,302	Noor Hasnida Mohd Hashim (PH-PPBM)	1,834	Saarani Mohamad (BN-UMNO)	1,844
N5	Selama	Mohd Akmal Kamaruddin (GS-PAS)	5,516	289	Faizul Arby Mohd Shohor (BN-UMNO)	5,227	Mohamad Daud Mohd Yusoff (BN-UMNO)	619
N5	Selama	Mohd Akmal Kamaruddin (GS-PAS)	5,516	289	Razali Ismail (PH-PAN)	2,618	Mohamad Daud Mohd Yusoff (BN-UMNO)	619
N6	Kubu Gajah	Khalil Yahaya (GS-PAS)	5,786	180	Saliza Ahmad (BN-UMNO)	5,606	Ahmad Hasbullah Alias (BN-UMNO)	1,085
N6	Kubu Gajah	Khalil Yahaya (GS-PAS)	5,786	180	Mat Supri Musa (PH-PPBM)	1,671	Ahmad Hasbullah Alias (BN-UMNO)	1,085
N7	Batu Kurau	Muhammad Amin Zakaria (BN-UMNO)	6,168	2,308	Mohd Shahir Mohd Hassan (GS-PAS)	3,860	Muhammad Amin Zakaria (BN-UMNO)	3,834
N7	Batu Kurau	Muhammad Amin Zakaria (BN-UMNO)	6,168	2,308	Muhamad Aiman Aizuddin Md Husin (PH-PKR)	3,051	Muhammad Amin Zakaria (BN-UMNO)	3,834
N7	Batu Kurau	Muhammad Amin Zakaria (BN-UMNO)	6,168	2,308	Zainal Abidin Abd Rahman (GS-BERJASA)	42	Muhammad Amin Zakaria (BN-UMNO)	3,834
N8	Titi Serong	Hasnul Zulkarnain Abdul Munaim (PH-PAN)	7,600	140	Norsalewati Mat Norwani (BN-UMNO)	7,460	Abu Bakar Hussian (GS-PAS)	'1,794
N8	Titi Serong	Hasnul Zulkarnain Abdul Munaim (PH-PAN)	7,600	140	Abu Bakar Hussian (GS-PAS)	6,993	Abu Bakar Hussian (GS-PAS)	'1,794
N9	Kuala Kurau	Abdul Yunus Jamhari (PH-PKR)	8,655	2,643	Shahrul Nizam Razali (BN-UMNO)	6,012	Abdul Yunus Jamhari (PH-PKR)	5,014
N9	Kuala Kurau	Abdul Yunus Jamhari (PH-PKR)	8,655	2,643	Abdul Baharin Mohd Desa (GS-PAS)	5,997	Abdul Yunus Jamhari (PH-PKR)	5,014
N10	Alor Pongsu	Sham Mat Sahat (BN-UMNO)	6,556	1,162	Wan Tarmizi Abd Aziz (GS-PAS)	5,394	Sham Mat Sahat (BN-UMNO)	2,196
N10	Alor Pongsu	Sham Mat Sahat (BN-UMNO)	6,556	1,162	Ahmad Zaki Husin (PH-PKR)	4,595	Sham Mat Sahat (BN-UMNO)	2,196
N11	Gunong Semanggol	Razman Zakaria (GS-PAS)	7,444	1,903	Zaini Cha (BN-UMNO)	5,541	Mohd Zawawi Abu Hassan (GS-PAS)	1,405
N11	Gunong Semanggol	Razman Zakaria (GS-PAS)	7,444	1,903	Ismail Ali (PH-PPBM)	3,520	Mohd Zawawi Abu Hassan (GS-PAS)	1,405
N12	Selinsing	Mohamad Noor Dawoo (BN-UMNO)	5,167	97	Husin Din (GS-PAS)	5,070	Husin Din (GS-PAS)	809
N12	Selinsing	Mohamad Noor Dawoo (BN-UMNO)	5,167	97	Ahmad Saqid Ansorullah Ahmad Jihbadz Mokhlis (PH-PAN)	4,016	Husin Din (GS-PAS)	809
N13	Kuala Sepetang (previously known as Kuala Sapetang)	Mohd Kamaruddin Abu Bakar (BN-UMNO)	8,993	329	Chua Yee Ling (PH-PKR)	8,664	Chua Yee Ling (PH-PKR)	758
N13	Kuala Sepetang (previously known as Kuala Sapetang)	Mohd Kamaruddin Abu Bakar (BN-UMNO)	8,993	329	Rahim Ismail (GS-PAS)	6,296	Chua Yee Ling (PH-PKR)	758
N14	Changkat Jering	Ahmad Saidi Mohamad Daud (BN-UMNO)	8,818	1,922	Megat Shariffuddin Ibrahim (PH-PAN)	6,896	Mohammad Nizar Jamaluddin (PH-PAN)	1,170
N14	Changkat Jering	Ahmad Saidi Mohamad Daud (BN-UMNO)	8,818	1,922	Mohd Nordin Jaafar (GS-PAS)	6,199	Mohammad Nizar Jamaluddin (PH-PAN)	1,170
N15	Trong	Jamilah Zakaria (BN-UMNO)	5,139	1,898	Muhd Faisal Abd Rahman (GS-PAS)	3,241	Zabri Abd Wahid (BN-UMNO)	1,804
N15	Trong	Jamilah Zakaria (BN-UMNO)	5,139	1,898	Shaharuddin Abdul Rashid (PH-PPBM)	2,546	Zabri Abd Wahid (BN-UMNO)	1,804
N16	Kamunting	Muhd Fadhil Nuruddin (PH-PAN)	9,898	1,780	Mohamad Zahir Abdul Khalid (BN-UMNO)	8,118	Mohamad Zahir Abdul Khalid (BN-UMNO)	887
N16	Kamunting	Muhd Fadhil Nuruddin (PH-PAN)	9,898	1,780	Mohd Fakhrudin Abd Aziz (GS-PAS)	5,276	Mohamad Zahir Abdul Khalid (BN-UMNO)	887
N17	Pokok Assam	Leow Thye Yih (PH-DAP)	16,954	12,032	Lee Li Kuan (BN-MCA)	4,922	Teh Kok Lim (PH-DAP)	7,925
N18	Aulong	Nga Kor Ming (PH-DAP)	18,123	12,064	Soo Kay Ping (BN-GERAKAN)	6,059	Leow Thye Yih (PH-DAP)	7,330
N19	Chenderoh	Zainun Mat Noor (BN-UMNO)	5,546	2,370	Khairul Anuar Musa (PH-PKR)	3,176	Zainun Mat Noor (BN-UMNO)	1,567
N19	Chenderoh	Zainun Mat Noor (BN-UMNO)	5,546	2,370	Mohd Farid Faizi Azizan (GS-PAS)	2,944	Zainun Mat Noor (BN-UMNO)	1,567
N20	Lubok Merbau	Jurij Jalaluddin (BN-UMNO)	4,908	409	Azizi Mohamed Ridzuwan (GS-PAS)	4,499	Siti Salmah Mat Jusak (BN-UMNO)	53
N20	Lubok Merbau	Jurij Jalaluddin (BN-UMNO)	4,908	409	Zulkarnine Hashim (PH-PPBM)	4,179	Siti Salmah Mat Jusak (BN-UMNO)	53
N21	Lintang	Mohd Zolkafly Harun (BN-UMNO)	10,605	4,582	Madhi Hassan (PH-PKR)	6,023	Mohd Zolkafly Harun (BN-UMNO)	3,977
N21	Lintang	Mohd Zolkafly Harun (BN-UMNO)	10,605	4,582	Isran Fahmi Ismail (GS-PAS)	3,460	Mohd Zolkafly Harun (BN-UMNO)	3,977
N22	Jalong	Loh Sze Yee (PH-DAP)	16,138	9,602	Tan Lian Hoe (BN-GERAKAN)	6,536	Loh Sze Yee (PH-DAP)	6,769
N23	Manjoi	Asmuni Awi (PH-PAN)	20,052	3,532	Mohamad Ziad Mohamed Zainal Abidin (BN-UMNO)	16,520	Mohamad Ziad Mohamed Zainal Abidin (BN-UMNO)	132
N23	Manjoi	Asmuni Awi (PH-PAN)	20,052	3,532	Mohd Hafez Sabri (GS-PAS)	10,830	Mohamad Ziad Mohamed Zainal Abidin (BN-UMNO)	132
N24	Hulu Kinta	Muhamad Arafat Varisai Mahamad (PH-PKR)	17,766	3,713	Aminuddin Md Hanafiah (BN-UMNO)	14,053	Aminuddin Md Hanafiah (BN-UMNO)	6,118
N24	Hulu Kinta	Muhamad Arafat Varisai Mahamad (PH-PKR)	17,766	3,713	Mat Salleh Said (GS-PAS)	7,425	Aminuddin Md Hanafiah (BN-UMNO)	6,118
N24	Hulu Kinta	Muhamad Arafat Varisai Mahamad (PH-PKR)	17,766	3,713	Murugiah Subramaniam (IND)	217	Aminuddin Md Hanafiah (BN-UMNO)	6,118
N25	Canning	Jenny Choy Tsi Jen (PH-DAP)	21,268	18,292	Liew Kar Tuan (BN-GERAKAN)	2,976	Wong Kah Woh (PH-DAP)	14,444
N26	Tebing Tinggi	Abdul Aziz Bari (PH-DAP)	10,334	3,927	Tony Khoo Boon Chuan (BN-MCA)	6,407	Ong Boon Piow (PH-DAP)	5,887
N26	Tebing Tinggi	Abdul Aziz Bari (PH-DAP)	10,334	3,927	Mazlan Md Isa (GS-PAS)	3,931	Ong Boon Piow (PH-DAP)	5,887
N27	Pasir Pinji	Howard Lee Chuan How (PH-DAP)	23,282	20,856	Ng Kai Cheong (BN-MCA)	2,426	Howard Lee Chuan How (PH-DAP)	13,632
N28	Bercham	Ong Boon Piow (PH-DAP)	24,647	20,709	Low Guo Nan (BN-MCA)	3,938	Cheong Chee Khing (PH-DAP)	13,916
N29	Kepayang	Ko Chung Sen (PH-DAP)	12,417	9,495	Chang Kok Aun (BN-MCA)	2,922	Nga Kor Ming (PH-DAP)	4,604
N30	Buntong	Sivasubramaniam Athinarayanan (PH-DAP)	18,005	15,187	Thangarani T. Thiagarajan (BN-MIC)	2,682	Sivasubramaniam Athinarayanan (PH-DAP)	8,629
N30	Buntong	Sivasubramaniam Athinarayanan (PH-DAP)	18,005	15,187	Mohanarani Rasiah (PSM)	813	Sivasubramaniam Athinarayanan (PH-DAP)	8,629
N31	Jelapang	Cheah Pou Hian (PH-DAP)	16,940	15,187	Thankaraj Krishnan (BN-MIC)	1,753	Teh Hock Ke (PH-DAP)	12,266
N31	Jelapang	Cheah Pou Hian (PH-DAP)	16,940	15,187	Saraswathy Muthu (PSM)	944	Teh Hock Ke (PH-DAP)	12,266
N32	Menglembu	Chaw Kam Foon (PH-DAP)	20,456	17,948	Wong Kam Seng (BN-MCA)	2,508	Lim Pek Har (PH-DAP)	16,799
N32	Menglembu	Chaw Kam Foon (PH-DAP)	20,456	17,948	Leon Chin Kwai Leong (PSM)	248	Lim Pek Har (PH-DAP)	16,799
N33	Tronoh	Paul Yong Choo Kiong (PH-DAP)	15,061	10,501	Yuen Chan How (BN-MCA)	4,560	Paul Yong Choo Kiong (PH-DAP)	6,191
N33	Tronoh	Paul Yong Choo Kiong (PH-DAP)	15,061	10,501	Andy Chin Kwai Heng (PSM)	333	Paul Yong Choo Kiong (PH-DAP)	6,191
N34	Bukit Chandan	Maslin Sham Razman (BN-UMNO)	5,929	464	Mohamad Imran Abd Hamid (PH-PKR)	5,465	Maslin Sham Razman (BN-UMNO)	959
N34	Bukit Chandan	Maslin Sham Razman (BN-UMNO)	5,929	464	Intan Noraini Mohamad Basir (GS-PAS)	2,743	Maslin Sham Razman (BN-UMNO)	959
N35	Manong	Mohamad Zuraimi Razali (BN-UMNO)	6,267	571	Mohamad Isa Jaafar (PH-PPBM)	5,696	Mohamad Kamil Shafie (BN-UMNO)	231
N35	Manong	Mohamad Zuraimi Razali (BN-UMNO)	6,267	571	Jamil Dzulkarnain (GS-PAS)	4,004	Mohamad Kamil Shafie (BN-UMNO)	231
N36	Pengkalan Baharu	Abdul Manaf Hashim (BN-UMNO)	6,312	1,624	Murad Abdullah (PH-PPBM)	4,688	Abd Manap Hashim (BN-UMNO)	2,505
N36	Pengkalan Baharu	Abdul Manaf Hashim (BN-UMNO)	6,312	1,624	Zakaria Hashim (GS-PAS)	2,781	Abd Manap Hashim (BN-UMNO)	2,505
N37	Pantai Remis	Wong May Ing (PH-DAP)	18,608	13,316	Ho Kean Wei (BN-MCA)	5,292	Wong May Ing (PH-DAP)	9,471
N38	Astaka (previously known as Sitiawan)	Teoh Yee Chern (PH-DAP)	18,814	15,176	Teng Keek Soong (BN-MCA)	3,638	Ngeh Koo Ham (PH-DAP)	11,820
N39	Belanja	Khairudin Abu Hanipah (BN-UMNO)	5,879	2,729	Mohd Zahid Abu Bakar (GS-PAS)	3,150	Mohd Nizar Zakaria (BN-UMNO)	2,963
N39	Belanja	Khairudin Abu Hanipah (BN-UMNO)	5,879	2,729	Yahanis Yahya (PH-PPBM)	2,871	Mohd Nizar Zakaria (BN-UMNO)	2,963
N40	Bota	Khairul Shahril Mohamed (BN-UMNO)	7,411	1,822	Muhamad Ismi Mat Taib (GS-PAS)	5,589	Nasarudin Hashim (BN-UMNO)	3,448
N40	Bota	Khairul Shahril Mohamed (BN-UMNO)	7,411	1,822	Azrul Hakkim Azhar (PH-PPBM)	4,070	Nasarudin Hashim (BN-UMNO)	3,448
N41	Malim Nawar	Leong Cheok Keng (PH-DAP)	11,271	6,082	Chang Gwo Chyang (BN-MCA)	5,189	Leong Cheok Keng (PH-DAP)	4,343
N41	Malim Nawar	Leong Cheok Keng (PH-DAP)	11,271	6,082	Bawani S. Kaniapan (PSM)	213	Leong Cheok Keng (PH-DAP)	4,343
N42	Keranji	Chong Zhemin (PH-DAP)	12,072	8,041	Daniel Wa Wai How (BN-MCA)	4,031	Chen Fook Chye (PH-DAP)	5,561
N43	Tualang Sekah	Nolee Ashilin Mohamed Radzi (BN-UMNO)	8,767	1,099	Mohd Azlan Helmi (PH-PKR)	7,668	Nolee Ashilin Mohammed Radzi Manan (BN-UMNO)	2,046
N43	Tualang Sekah	Nolee Ashilin Mohamed Radzi (BN-UMNO)	8,767	1,099	Mohd Sofian Rejab (GS-PAS)	3,162	Nolee Ashilin Mohammed Radzi Manan (BN-UMNO)	2,046
N44	Sungai Rapat	Mohammad Nizar Jamaluddin (PH-PAN)	12,425	3,614	Hamzah Kasim (BN-UMNO)	8,811	Radzi Zainon (GS-PAS)	2,638
N44	Sungai Rapat	Mohammad Nizar Jamaluddin (PH-PAN)	12,425	3,614	Radzi Zainon (GS-PAS)	4,627	Radzi Zainon (GS-PAS)	2,638
N45	Simpang Pulai	Tan Kar Hing (PH-PKR)	25,659	20,689	Liew Yee Lin (BN-MCA)	4,970	Tan Kar Hing (PH-PKR)	11,083
N45	Simpang Pulai	Tan Kar Hing (PH-PKR)	25,659	20,689	Mohamad Arif Abdul Latiff (GS-PAS)	4,061	Tan Kar Hing (PH-PKR)	11,083
N46	Teja	Sandrea Ng Shy Ching (PH-PKR)	10,546	4,390	Chang Chun Cheun (BN-MCA)	6,156	Chang Lih Kang (PH-PKR)	2,082
N46	Teja	Sandrea Ng Shy Ching (PH-PKR)	10,546	4,390	Mokhthar Abdullah (GS-PAS)	2,028	Chang Lih Kang (PH-PKR)	2,082
N47	Chenderiang	Ahmad Faizal Azumu (PH-PPBM)	7,662	39	Choong Shin Heng (BN-MCA)	7,623	Mah Hang Soon (BN-MCA)	4,767
N47	Chenderiang	Ahmad Faizal Azumu (PH-PPBM)	7,662	39	Nordin Hassan (GS-PAS)	1,735	Mah Hang Soon (BN-MCA)	4,767
N48	Ayer Kuning	Samsudin Abu Hassan (BN-UMNO)	9,141	2,087	Tan Seng Toh (PH-PAN)	7,054	Samsudin Abu Hassan (BN-UMNO)	3,485
N48	Ayer Kuning	Samsudin Abu Hassan (BN-UMNO)	9,141	2,087	Salmah Ab Latif (GS-PAS)	2,993	Samsudin Abu Hassan (BN-UMNO)	3,485
N49	Sungai Manik	Zainol Fadzi Paharudin (BN-UMNO)	9,265	1,939	Mohamad Maharani Md Tasi (PH-PKR)	7,326	Zainol Fadzi Paharudin (BN-UMNO)	1,854
N49	Sungai Manik	Zainol Fadzi Paharudin (BN-UMNO)	9,265	1,939	Mohamed Yusoff Abdullah (GS-PAS)	4,071	Zainol Fadzi Paharudin (BN-UMNO)	1,854
N49	Sungai Manik	Zainol Fadzi Paharudin (BN-UMNO)	9,265	1,939	Mustapa Kamal Maulut (GS-BERJASA)	169	Zainol Fadzi Paharudin (BN-UMNO)	1,854
N50	Kampong Gajah	Wan Norashikin Wan Noordin (BN-UMNO)	11,026	3,345	Mustafa Shaari (GS-PAS)	7,681	Abdullah Fauzi Ahmad Razali (BN-UMNO)	6,100
N50	Kampong Gajah	Wan Norashikin Wan Noordin (BN-UMNO)	11,026	3,345	Zaiton Latiff (PH-PAN)	3,861	Abdullah Fauzi Ahmad Razali (BN-UMNO)	6,100
N51	Pasir Panjang	Yahaya Mat Nor (PH-PAN)	14,123	1,219	Rashidi Ibrahim (BN-UMNO)	12,904	Rashidi Ibrahim (BN-UMNO)	304
N51	Pasir Panjang	Yahaya Mat Nor (PH-PAN)	14,123	1,219	Rohawati Abidin (GS-PAS)	7,795	Rashidi Ibrahim (BN-UMNO)	304
N52	Pangkor	Zambry Abd Kadir (BN-UMNO)	8,378	1,626	Nordin Ahmad Ismail (PH-PPBM)	6,752	Zambry Abd Kadir (BN-UMNO)	5,124
N52	Pangkor	Zambry Abd Kadir (BN-UMNO)	8,378	1,626	Zainal Abidin Saad (GS-PAS)	3,638	Zambry Abd Kadir (BN-UMNO)	5,124
N53	Rungkup	Shahrul Zaman Yahya (BN-UMNO)	6,529	3,069	Hatim Musa (PH-PAN)	3,460	Shahrul Zaman Yahya (BN-UMNO)	613
N53	Rungkup	Shahrul Zaman Yahya (BN-UMNO)	6,529	3,069	Mohd Mohkheri Jalil (GS-PAS)	2,430	Shahrul Zaman Yahya (BN-UMNO)	613
N54	Hutan Melintang	Khairuddin Tarmizi (BN-UMNO)	10,961	741	Manivannan K. Gowindasamy (PH-PKR)	10,220	Kesavan Subramaniam (PH-PKR)	1,240
N54	Hutan Melintang	Khairuddin Tarmizi (BN-UMNO)	10,961	741	Mohd Misbahul Munir Masduki (GS-PAS)	3,150	Kesavan Subramaniam (PH-PKR)	1,240
N55	Pasir Bedamar	Terence Naidu Raja Naidu @ Rajanaidu (PH-DAP)	19,480	14,520	Kong Sun Chin (BN-MCA)	4,960	Terence Naidu Raja Naidu @ Rajanaidu (PH-DAP)	13,037
N55	Pasir Bedamar	Terence Naidu Raja Naidu @ Rajanaidu (PH-DAP)	19,480	14,520	Kumaresan Shanmugam (GS-PAS)	939	Terence Naidu Raja Naidu @ Rajanaidu (PH-DAP)	13,037
N56	Changkat Jong	Mohd Azhar Jamaluddin (BN-UMNO)	11,216	67	Muhammad Faizul Mohamed Ismail (PH-PPBM)	11,149	Mohd Azhar Jamaluddin (BN-UMNO)	1,118
N56	Changkat Jong	Mohd Azhar Jamaluddin (BN-UMNO)	11,216	67	Mohd Azhar Mohd Rafiei (GS-PAS)	5,834	Mohd Azhar Jamaluddin (BN-UMNO)	1,118
N57	Sungkai	Sivanesan Achalingam (PH-DAP)	9,631	6,493	Elango Vadiveloo (BN-MIC)	3,138	Sivanesan Achalingam (PH-DAP)	3,511
N57	Sungkai	Sivanesan Achalingam (PH-DAP)	9,631	6,493	Applasamy Jetakiah (GS-PAS)	505	Sivanesan Achalingam (PH-DAP)	3,511
N58	Slim	Mohd. Khusairi Abdul Talib (BN-UMNO)	8,327	2,183	Mohd Amran Ibrahim (PH-PPBM)	6,144	Mohd Khusairi Abdul Talib (BN-UMNO)	3,853
N58	Slim	Mohd. Khusairi Abdul Talib (BN-UMNO)	8,327	2,183	Muhammad Zulfadli Zainal (GS-PAS)	4,103	Mohd Khusairi Abdul Talib (BN-UMNO)	3,853
N59	Behrang	Aminuddin Zulkipli (PH-PAN)	9,770	409	Rusnah Kassim (BN-UMNO)	9,361	Rusnah Kassim (BN-UMNO)	1,968
N59	Behrang	Aminuddin Zulkipli (PH-PAN)	9,770	409	Syed Zamzuri Syed Nengah (GS-PAS)	3,334	Rusnah Kassim (BN-UMNO)	1,968

== Pahang ==
#	Constituency	Winner	Votes	Majority	Opponent(s)	Votes	Incumbent	Incumbent Majority
BN 25 | GS 8 | PH 9 | Independent 0
N1	Tanah Rata	Chiong Yoke Kong (PH-DAP)	8,821	3,589	Leong Tak Man (BN-MCA)	5,232	Leong Ngah Ngah (PH-DAP)	3,144
N1	Tanah Rata	Chiong Yoke Kong (PH-DAP)	8,821	3,589	Kumar Silambaram @ G. Kumaar Aamaan (GS-PAS)	600	Leong Ngah Ngah (PH-DAP)	3,144
N2	Jelai	Wan Rosdy Wan Ismail (BN-UMNO)	5,858	3,507	Abdul Karim Nor (GS-PAS)	2,351	Wan Rosdy Wan Ismail (BN-UMNO)	3,182
N2	Jelai	Wan Rosdy Wan Ismail (BN-UMNO)	5,858	3,507	Abdul Rasid Mohamed Ali (PH-PPBM)	1,298	Wan Rosdy Wan Ismail (BN-UMNO)	3,182
N2	Jelai	Wan Rosdy Wan Ismail (BN-UMNO)	5,858	3,507	Mat Nor Ayat (PSM)	229	Wan Rosdy Wan Ismail (BN-UMNO)	3,182
N3	Padang Tengku	Mustapa Long (BN-UMNO)	5,691	1,244	Roslan Harun (GS-PAS)	4,447	Mustapa Long (BN-UMNO)	1,914
N3	Padang Tengku	Mustapa Long (BN-UMNO)	5,691	1,244	Alias Abd Rahman (PH-PPBM)	1,303	Mustapa Long (BN-UMNO)	1,914
N4	Cheka	Lee Ah Wong (BN-MCA)	3,475	202	Saludin Endol (GS-PAS)	3,273	Fong Koong Fue (BN-MCA)	1,185
N4	Cheka	Lee Ah Wong (BN-MCA)	3,475	202	Rasid Muhamad (PH-PKR)	2,930	Fong Koong Fue (BN-MCA)	1,185
N5	Benta	Mohd. Soffi Abd. Razak (BN-UMNO)	3,261	340	Sabaruddin Mohd Yassim (PH-PKR)	2,921	Mohd Soffi Abd Razak (BN-UMNO)	901
N5	Benta	Mohd. Soffi Abd. Razak (BN-UMNO)	3,261	340	Annuar Kassim (GS-PAS)	739	Mohd Soffi Abd Razak (BN-UMNO)	901
N6	Batu Talam	Abd. Aziz Mat Kiram (BN-UMNO)	6,922	4,320	Tengku Abdul Rahman Tengku Ja'afar (GS-PAS)	2,602	Abdul Aziz Mat Kiram (BN-UMNO)	4,137
N6	Batu Talam	Abd. Aziz Mat Kiram (BN-UMNO)	6,922	4,320	Dasimah Zainudin (PH-PKR)	2,441	Abdul Aziz Mat Kiram (BN-UMNO)	4,137
N7	Tras	Chow Yu Hui (PH-DAP)	15,660	9,953	Ng Leap Pong (BN-MCA)	5,707	Choong Siew Onn (PH-DAP)	6,762
N7	Tras	Chow Yu Hui (PH-DAP)	15,660	9,953	Chin Choy Hee (GS-PAS)	1,506	Choong Siew Onn (PH-DAP)	6,762
N8	Dong	Shahiruddin Ab Moin (BN-UMNO)	6,294	3,832	Bedu Rahim Ismail (GS-PAS)	2,462	Shahiruddin Ab Moin (BN-UMNO)	481
N8	Dong	Shahiruddin Ab Moin (BN-UMNO)	6,294	3,832	Hamzah Jaafar (PH-PAN)	2,342	Shahiruddin Ab Moin (BN-UMNO)	481
N9	Tahan	Mohd Zakhwan Ahmad Badarddin (GS-PAS)	5,638	69	Wan Amizan Wan Abdul Razak (BN-UMNO)	5,569	Wan Amizan Wan Abdul Razak (BN-UMNO)	1,090
N9	Tahan	Mohd Zakhwan Ahmad Badarddin (GS-PAS)	5,638	69	Nordin Samat (PH-PPBM)	945	Wan Amizan Wan Abdul Razak (BN-UMNO)	1,090
N10	Damak	Zuridan Mohd Daud (GS-PAS)	8,444	1,456	Wong Chun Yuan (PH-PKR)	6,988	Lau Lee (BN-MCA)	64
N10	Damak	Zuridan Mohd Daud (GS-PAS)	8,444	1,456	Lim Chong Ly (BN-MCA)	4,395	Lau Lee (BN-MCA)	64
N11	Pulau Tawar	Nazri Ngah (BN-UMNO)	8,446	587	Ahmad Naawi Samah (GS-PAS)	7,859	Ahmad Shukri Ismail (BN-UMNO)	3,496
N11	Pulau Tawar	Nazri Ngah (BN-UMNO)	8,446	587	Jamaluddin Abd Rahim (PH-PKR)	1,973	Ahmad Shukri Ismail (BN-UMNO)	3,496
N12	Beserah	Andansura Rabu (GS-PAS)	12,239	1,305	Zulkifli Mohamed (PH-PAN)	10,934	Andansura Rabu (GS-PAS)	3,987
N12	Beserah	Andansura Rabu (GS-PAS)	12,239	1,305	Suhaimi Jusoh (BN-UMNO)	8,732	Andansura Rabu (GS-PAS)	3,987
N13	Semambu	Lee Chean Chung (PH-PKR)	14,991	5,511	Mohd Yusof Hashim (GS-PAS)	9,480	Lee Chean Chung (PH-PKR)	3,200
N13	Semambu	Lee Chean Chung (PH-PKR)	14,991	5,511	Quek Tai Seong (BN-MCA)	7,323	Lee Chean Chung (PH-PKR)	3,200
N14	Teruntum	Sim Chon Siang (PH-PKR)	12,227	7,725	Tee Choon Ser (BN-MCA)	4,502	Sim Chon Siang (PH-PKR)	4,437
N14	Teruntum	Sim Chon Siang (PH-PKR)	12,227	7,725	Azizah Mohd Ali (GS-PAS)	3,039	Sim Chon Siang (PH-PKR)	4,437
N15	Tanjung Lumpur	Rosli Abdul Jabar (GS-PAS)	8,198	1,339	T. Zulkifly T. Ahmad (BN-UMNO)	6,859	Rosli Abdul Jabar (GS-PAS)	796
N15	Tanjung Lumpur	Rosli Abdul Jabar (GS-PAS)	8,198	1,339	Sabrina Md Yusoff (PH-PAN)	5,622	Rosli Abdul Jabar (GS-PAS)	796
N16	Inderapura	Shafik Fauzan Sharif (BN-UMNO)	5,568	2,165	Wan Maseri Wan Mohd (GS-PAS)	3,403	Shafik Fauzan Sharif (BN-UMNO)	1,944
N16	Inderapura	Shafik Fauzan Sharif (BN-UMNO)	5,568	2,165	Fakhrul Anuar Zulkawi (PH-PKR)	1,806	Shafik Fauzan Sharif (BN-UMNO)	1,944
N17	Sungai Lembing	Md Sohaimi Mohamed Shah (BN-UMNO)	5,436	1,968	Mohamad Hazmi Dibok (GS-PAS)	3,468	Md Sohaimi Mohamed Shah (BN-UMNO)	2,591
N17	Sungai Lembing	Md Sohaimi Mohamed Shah (BN-UMNO)	5,436	1,968	Fauzi Abdul Rahman (PH-PKR)	2,687	Md Sohaimi Mohamed Shah (BN-UMNO)	2,591
N18	Lepar	Abdul Rahim Muda (BN-UMNO)	6,500	2,779	Nur Ad-din Ibrahim (PH-PAN)	3,721	Vacant	3,716
N18	Lepar	Abdul Rahim Muda (BN-UMNO)	6,500	2,779	Mohd Nor Hisam Muhammad (GS-PAS)	3,569	Vacant	3,716
N19	Panching	Mohd Tarmizi Yahaya (GS-PAS)	7,143	135	Mohd Zaili Besar (BN-UMNO)	7,008	Mohd Zaili Besar (BN-UMNO)	1,036
N19	Panching	Mohd Tarmizi Yahaya (GS-PAS)	7,143	135	Kamarzaman Mohamed Yunus (PH-PKR)	4,490	Mohd Zaili Besar (BN-UMNO)	1,036
N19	Panching	Mohd Tarmizi Yahaya (GS-PAS)	7,143	135	Benzin Dagok (IND)	42	Mohd Zaili Besar (BN-UMNO)	1,036
N20	Pulau Manis	Khairuddin Mahmud (BN-UMNO)	8,282	2,334	Zainuddin Noh (GS-PAS)	5,948	Khairuddin Mahmud (BN-UMNO)	5,596
N20	Pulau Manis	Khairuddin Mahmud (BN-UMNO)	8,282	2,334	Abu Bakar Lebai Sudin (PH-DAP)	2,101	Khairuddin Mahmud (BN-UMNO)	5,596
N21	Peramu Jaya	Sh Mohamed Puzi Sh Ali (BN-UMNO)	15,433	7,182	Abu Kassim Manaf (GS-PAS)	8,251	Sh. Mohamed Puzi Sh. Ali (BN-UMNO)	7,627
N21	Peramu Jaya	Sh Mohamed Puzi Sh Ali (BN-UMNO)	15,433	7,182	Salim Abdul Majid (PH-PPBM)	2,644	Sh. Mohamed Puzi Sh. Ali (BN-UMNO)	7,627
N22	Bebar	Mohd. Fakhruddin Mohd. Arif (BN-UMNO)	8,172	5,720	Mohd Nazhar Othman (GS-PAS)	2,452	Mohd Fakhruddin Mohd Arif (BN-UMNO)	6,715
N22	Bebar	Mohd. Fakhruddin Mohd. Arif (BN-UMNO)	8,172	5,720	Afif Syairol Abd Rahman (PH-PPBM)	968	Mohd Fakhruddin Mohd Arif (BN-UMNO)	6,715
N23	Chini	Abu Bakar Harun (BN-UMNO)	10,027	4,622	Muhd Fadhil Noor Abdul Karim (GS-PAS)	5,405	Abu Bakar Harun (BN-UMNO)	7,675
N23	Chini	Abu Bakar Harun (BN-UMNO)	10,027	4,622	Mohamad Razali Ithnain (PH-PKR)	1,065	Abu Bakar Harun (BN-UMNO)	7,675
N24	Luit	Mohd Soffian Abd Jalil (GS-PAS)	4,238	272	Nurhidayah Mohamad Shahaimi (BN-UMNO)	3,966	Nurhidayah Mohamad Shahaimi (BN-UMNO)	401
N24	Luit	Mohd Soffian Abd Jalil (GS-PAS)	4,238	272	Rosli Amin (PH-PKR)	1,582	Nurhidayah Mohamad Shahaimi (BN-UMNO)	401
N25	Kuala Sentul	Shahaniza Shamsuddin (BN-UMNO)	5,541	2,039	Fazil Azmi Nadzri (GS-PAS)	3,502	Shahaniza Shamsuddin (BN-UMNO)	3,293
N25	Kuala Sentul	Shahaniza Shamsuddin (BN-UMNO)	5,541	2,039	Bostamin Bakar (PH-PKR)	1,299	Shahaniza Shamsuddin (BN-UMNO)	3,293
N26	Chenor	Mujjibur Rahman Ishak (GS-PAS)	6,016	514	Mohamed Arifin Awang Ismail (BN-UMNO)	5,502	Mohamed Arifin Awang Ismail (BN-UMNO)	2,309
N26	Chenor	Mujjibur Rahman Ishak (GS-PAS)	6,016	514	Zuliana Mohamed (PH-PKR)	1,035	Mohamed Arifin Awang Ismail (BN-UMNO)	2,309
N27	Jenderak	Mohamed Jaafar (BN-UMNO)	4,213	1,713	Abdullah Yusoh (GS-PAS)	2,500	Mohamed Jaafar (BN-UMNO)	2,182
N27	Jenderak	Mohamed Jaafar (BN-UMNO)	4,213	1,713	Faziah Baharom (PH-PPBM)	1,622	Mohamed Jaafar (BN-UMNO)	2,182
N28	Kerdau	Syed Ibrahim Syed Ahmad (BN-UMNO)	5,255	1,934	Aireroshairi Roslan (GS-PAS)	3,321	Syed Ibrahim Syed Ahmad (BN-UMNO)	2,513
N28	Kerdau	Syed Ibrahim Syed Ahmad (BN-UMNO)	5,255	1,934	Adnan Abdul Manaf (PH-PAN)	1,298	Syed Ibrahim Syed Ahmad (BN-UMNO)	2,513
N29	Jengka	Shahril Azman Abd Halim (GS-PAS)	10,111	1,813	Wan Salman Wan Ismail (BN-UMNO)	8,298	Wan Salman Wan Ismail (BN-UMNO)	1,303
N29	Jengka	Shahril Azman Abd Halim (GS-PAS)	10,111	1,813	Jelani Ludin (PH-PAN)	1,722	Wan Salman Wan Ismail (BN-UMNO)	1,303
N30	Mentakab	Woo Chee Wan (PH-DAP)	10,547	5,829	Abirerah Awang Chik (GS-PAS)	4,718	Tengku Zulpuri Shah Raja Puji (PH-DAP)	1,554
N30	Mentakab	Woo Chee Wan (PH-DAP)	10,547	5,829	Wong Tat Chee (BN-MCA)	4,548	Tengku Zulpuri Shah Raja Puji (PH-DAP)	1,554
N30	Mentakab	Woo Chee Wan (PH-DAP)	10,547	5,829	Chuah Boon Seong (IND)	956	Tengku Zulpuri Shah Raja Puji (PH-DAP)	1,554
N31	Lanchang	Mohd Sharkar Shamsudin (BN-UMNO)	8,824	3,725	Abas Awang (PH-PKR)	5,099	Mohd Sharkar Shamsuddin (BN-UMNO)	1,127
N31	Lanchang	Mohd Sharkar Shamsudin (BN-UMNO)	8,824	3,725	Hasan Omar (GS-PAS)	4,836	Mohd Sharkar Shamsuddin (BN-UMNO)	1,127
N31	Lanchang	Mohd Sharkar Shamsudin (BN-UMNO)	8,824	3,725	Mohd Khaidir Ahmad (IND)	80	Mohd Sharkar Shamsuddin (BN-UMNO)	1,127
N32	Kuala Semantan	Nor Azmi Mat Ludin (BN-UMNO)	7,880	474	Hassanuddin Salim (GS-PAS)	7,406	Syed Hamid Syed Mohd (PH-PAN)	2,685
N32	Kuala Semantan	Nor Azmi Mat Ludin (BN-UMNO)	7,880	474	Syed Hamid Syed Mohd (PH-PAN)	6,095	Syed Hamid Syed Mohd (PH-PAN)	2,685
N33	Bilut	Lee Chin Chen (PH-DAP)	8,798	3,739	Poo Mun Hoong (BN-MCA)	5,059	Chow Yu Hui (PH-DAP)	2,607
N33	Bilut	Lee Chin Chen (PH-DAP)	8,798	3,739	Mohd Zamri Nong (GS-PAS)	1,944	Chow Yu Hui (PH-DAP)	2,607
N34	Ketari	Young Syefura Othman (PH-DAP)	9,873	3,710	Lau Hoi Keong (BN-GERAKAN)	6,163	Lee Chin Chen (PH-DAP)	2,140
N34	Ketari	Young Syefura Othman (PH-DAP)	9,873	3,710	Roslan Md Esa (GS-PAS)	3,260	Lee Chin Chen (PH-DAP)	2,140
N35	Sabai	Kamache A. Doray Rajoo (PH-DAP)	4,374	495	Goonasakaren Raman (BN-MIC)	3,879	Kamache A. Doray Rajoo (PH-DAP)	117
N35	Sabai	Kamache A. Doray Rajoo (PH-DAP)	4,374	495	Mohd Khairuddin Abdullah (GS-PAS)	1,308	Kamache A. Doray Rajoo (PH-DAP)	117
N35	Sabai	Kamache A. Doray Rajoo (PH-DAP)	4,374	495	Karunaneethi Thangavel (IND)	145	Kamache A. Doray Rajoo (PH-DAP)	117
N36	Pelangai	Adnan Yaakob (BN-UMNO)	5,410	2,312	Norhaizan Abu Hassan (PH-PAN)	3,098	Adnan Yaakob (BN-UMNO)	2,475
N36	Pelangai	Adnan Yaakob (BN-UMNO)	5,410	2,312	Zaharim Osman (GS-PAS)	1,817	Adnan Yaakob (BN-UMNO)	2,475
N37	Guai	Norolazali Sulaiman (BN-UMNO)	8,147	3,295	Mohd Shahrul Mohamed (GS-PAS)	4,825	Norolazali Sulaiman (BN-UMNO)	2,398
N37	Guai	Norolazali Sulaiman (BN-UMNO)	8,147	3,295	Ahmad Majdil Fauzi Abd Aziz (PH-PAN)	2,547	Norolazali Sulaiman (BN-UMNO)	2,398
N38	Triang	Leong Yu Man (PH-DAP)	11,222	6,454	Tan Tin Loon (BN-GERAKAN)	4,768	Leong Yu Man (PH-DAP)	5,009
N39	Kemayan	Mohd Fadil Osman (BN-UMNO)	8,430	4,618	Manolan Mohamad (PH-PKR)	3,812	Mohd Fadil Osman (BN-UMNO)	4,063
N39	Kemayan	Mohd Fadil Osman (BN-UMNO)	8,430	4,618	Md Yusof Che Din (GS-PAS)	3,265	Mohd Fadil Osman (BN-UMNO)	4,063
N40	Bukit Ibam	Samsiah Arshad (BN-UMNO)	9,448	2,478	Nazri Ahmad (GS-PAS)	6,970	Wan Kadri Wan Mahusain (BN-UMNO)	5,466
N40	Bukit Ibam	Samsiah Arshad (BN-UMNO)	9,448	2,478	Zulkarnain Mohamad Ridzuan (PH-PPBM)	2,126	Wan Kadri Wan Mahusain (BN-UMNO)	5,466
N41	Muadzam Shah	Razali Kassim (BN-UMNO)	9,081	4,840	Ramli Awang Ahmat (GS-PAS)	4,241	Maznah Mazlan (BN-UMNO)	6,704
N41	Muadzam Shah	Razali Kassim (BN-UMNO)	9,081	4,840	Osman Abu Bakar (PH-PPBM)	2,781	Maznah Mazlan (BN-UMNO)	6,704
N42	Tioman	Mohd Johari Hussain (BN-UMNO)	6,662	1,280	Md Yunus Ramli (GS-PAS)	5,382	Mohd Johari Hussain (BN-UMNO)	4,086
N42	Tioman	Mohd Johari Hussain (BN-UMNO)	6,662	1,280	Ahmad Sazili Mohd Nor (PH-PAN)	3,029	Mohd Johari Hussain (BN-UMNO)	4,086
N42	Tioman	Mohd Johari Hussain (BN-UMNO)	6,662	1,280	Mohd Zolfakar Taib (IND)	58	Mohd Johari Hussain (BN-UMNO)	4,086

== Selangor ==
#	Constituency	Winner	Votes	Majority	Opponent(s)	Votes	Incumbent	Incumbent Majority
BN 4 | GS 1 | PH 51 | Independent 0
N1	Sungai Air Tawar	Rizam Ismail (BN-UMNO)	5,437	1,440	Zamri Yahya (GS-PAS)	3,997	Kamarol Zaki Abdul Malik (BN-UMNO)	1,416
N1	Sungai Air Tawar	Rizam Ismail (BN-UMNO)	5,437	1,440	Mohd Hamizar Sulaiman (PH-PPBM)	3,921	Kamarol Zaki Abdul Malik (BN-UMNO)	1,416
N2	Sabak	Ahmad Mustain Othman (PH-PAN)	6,981	130	Sallehudin Mohd Iskan (BN-UMNO)	6,851	Sallehen Mukhyi (GS-PAS)	399
N2	Sabak	Ahmad Mustain Othman (PH-PAN)	6,981	130	Sallehen Mukhyi (GS-PAS)	6,183	Sallehen Mukhyi (GS-PAS)	399
N3	Sungai Panjang	Mohd Imran Tamrin (BN-UMNO)	10,530	2,084	Mariam Abdul Rashid (PH-PAN)	8,446	Budiman Mohd Zohdi (BN-UMNO)	2,183
N3	Sungai Panjang	Mohd Imran Tamrin (BN-UMNO)	10,530	2,084	Mohd Razali Shaari (GS-PAS)	6,999	Budiman Mohd Zohdi (BN-UMNO)	2,183
N4	Sekinchan	Ng Suee Lim (PH-DAP)	7,863	2,844	Lee Yee Yuan (BN-MCA)	5,019	Ng Suee Lim (PH-DAP)	2,239
N4	Sekinchan	Ng Suee Lim (PH-DAP)	7,863	2,844	Mohd Fadzlin Taslimin (GS-PAS)	2,351	Ng Suee Lim (PH-DAP)	2,239
N5	Hulu Bernam	Rosni Sohar (BN-UMNO)	8,164	20	Mohd Amran Sakir (PH-PAN)	8,144	Rosni Sohar (BN-UMNO)	3,032
N5	Hulu Bernam	Rosni Sohar (BN-UMNO)	8,164	20	Mohammed Salleh Ri (GS-PAS)	2,554	Rosni Sohar (BN-UMNO)	3,032
N6	Kuala Kubu Baharu	Lee Kee Hiong (PH-DAP)	14,101	7,134	Naharudin Abd Rashid (GS-PAS)	3,306	Lee Kee Hiong (PH-DAP)	1,702
N6	Kuala Kubu Baharu	Lee Kee Hiong (PH-DAP)	14,101	7,134	Wong Koon Mun (BN-MCA)	6,967	Lee Kee Hiong (PH-DAP)	1,702
N7	Batang Kali	Harumaini Omar (PH-PPBM)	21,536	8,315	Mat Nadzari Ahmad Dahalan (BN-UMNO)	13,221	Mat Nadzari Ahmad Dahalan (BN-UMNO)	5,398
N7	Batang Kali	Harumaini Omar (PH-PPBM)	21,536	8,315	Mohd Hasnizan Harun (GS-PAS)	7,408	Mat Nadzari Ahmad Dahalan (BN-UMNO)	5,398
N8	Sungai Burong	Mohd Shamsudin Lias (BN-UMNO)	8,741	2,330	Mohd Zamri Mohd Zainulddin (GS-PAS)	6,411	Mohd Shamsudin Lias (BN-UMNO)	3,013
N8	Sungai Burong	Mohd Shamsudin Lias (BN-UMNO)	8,741	2,330	Mohd Tarmizi Lazim (PH-PPBM)	5,323	Mohd Shamsudin Lias (BN-UMNO)	3,013
N9	Permatang	Rozana Zainal Abidin (PH-PKR)	9,208	1,158	Sulaiman Abdul Razak (BN-UMNO)	8,050	Sulaiman Abdul Razak (BN-UMNO)	1,026
N9	Permatang	Rozana Zainal Abidin (PH-PKR)	9,208	1,158	Muhammad Jafaruddin Sheikh Daud (GS-PAS)	2,746	Sulaiman Abdul Razak (BN-UMNO)	1,026
N10	Bukit Melawati	Juwairiya Zulkifli (PH-PKR)	11,050	2,695	Jakiran Jacomah (BN-UMNO)	8,355	Jakiran Jacomah (BN-UMNO)	806
N10	Bukit Melawati	Juwairiya Zulkifli (PH-PKR)	11,050	2,695	Muhammad Rashid Muhammad Kassim (GS-PAS)	3,261	Jakiran Jacomah (BN-UMNO)	806
N11	Ijok	Idris Ahmad (PH-PKR)	8,914	2,114	Parthiban Karuppiah (BN-MIC)	6,800	Idris Ahmad (PH-PKR)	739
N11	Ijok	Idris Ahmad (PH-PKR)	8,914	2,114	Jefri Mejan (GS-IKATAN)	3,942	Idris Ahmad (PH-PKR)	739
N11	Ijok	Idris Ahmad (PH-PKR)	8,914	2,114	Kumaran Tamil Dassen (PRM)	76	Idris Ahmad (PH-PKR)	739
N12	Jeram	Mohd Shaid Rosli (PH-PPBM)	7,087	1,191	Zahar Azlan Ariffin (BN-UMNO)	5,896	Amiruddin Setro (BN-UMNO)	2,834
N12	Jeram	Mohd Shaid Rosli (PH-PPBM)	7,087	1,191	Mohd Noor Mohd Shahar (GS-PAS)	4,326	Amiruddin Setro (BN-UMNO)	2,834
N13	Kuang	Sallehudin Amiruddin (PH-PPBM)	9,845	2,860	Abdul Shukur Idrus (BN-UMNO)	6,985	Abdul Shukur Idrus (BN-UMNO)	1,255
N13	Kuang	Sallehudin Amiruddin (PH-PPBM)	9,845	2,860	Mohd Fauzan Madzlan (GS-PAS)	5,672	Abdul Shukur Idrus (BN-UMNO)	1,255
N13	Kuang	Sallehudin Amiruddin (PH-PPBM)	9,845	2,860	Mohd Rafie Mohamed Arif (PRM)	44	Abdul Shukur Idrus (BN-UMNO)	1,255
N14	Rawang	Chua Wei Kiat (PH-PKR)	29,946	23,860	Chan Wun Hoong (BN-MCA)	6,086	Gan Pei Nei (PH-PKR)	9,241
N14	Rawang	Chua Wei Kiat (PH-PKR)	29,946	23,860	Kong Tuck Wah (GS-PAS)	2,259	Gan Pei Nei (PH-PKR)	9,241
N14	Rawang	Chua Wei Kiat (PH-PKR)	29,946	23,860	Azman Mohd Noor (IND)	644	Gan Pei Nei (PH-PKR)	9,241
N15	Taman Templer	Mohd Sany Hamzan (PH-PAN)	18,362	7,903	Zaidy Abdul Talib (GS-PAS)	10,459	Zaidy Abdul Talib (GS-PAS)	7,467
N15	Taman Templer	Mohd Sany Hamzan (PH-PAN)	18,362	7,903	Md Nasir Ibrahim (BN-UMNO)	7,580	Zaidy Abdul Talib (GS-PAS)	7,467
N15	Taman Templer	Mohd Sany Hamzan (PH-PAN)	18,362	7,903	Rajandran Batumalai (PAP)	108	Zaidy Abdul Talib (GS-PAS)	7,467
N15	Taman Templer	Mohd Sany Hamzan (PH-PAN)	18,362	7,903	Koh Swe Yong (PRM)	82	Zaidy Abdul Talib (GS-PAS)	7,467
N16	Sungai Tua (previously known as Batu Caves)	Amirudin Shari (PH-PKR)	17,446	11,374	N. Rawisandran (BN-MIC)	6,072	Amirudin Shari (PH-PKR)	3,261
N16	Sungai Tua (previously known as Batu Caves)	Amirudin Shari (PH-PKR)	17,446	11,374	Mohammad Ibrahim (GS-PAS)	4,530	Amirudin Shari (PH-PKR)	3,261
N16	Sungai Tua (previously known as Batu Caves)	Amirudin Shari (PH-PKR)	17,446	11,374	Badrul Hisam Md Zin (IND)	268	Amirudin Shari (PH-PKR)	3,261
N17	Gombak Setia	Hilman Idham (PH-PKR)	24,157	12,399	Hasbullah Mohd Ridzwan (GS-PAS)	11,758	Hasbullah Mohd Ridzwan (GS-PAS)	1,681
N17	Gombak Setia	Hilman Idham (PH-PKR)	24,157	12,399	Megat Zulkarnain Omardin (BN-UMNO)	11,113	Hasbullah Mohd Ridzwan (GS-PAS)	1,681
N18	Hulu Kelang	Saari Sungib (PH-PAN)	25,746	15,349	Ismail Ahmad (BN-UMNO)	10,397	Saari Sungib (PH-PAN)	2,881
N18	Hulu Kelang	Saari Sungib (PH-PAN)	25,746	15,349	Kamalulhysham Mohd Suhut (GS-PAS)	7,573	Saari Sungib (PH-PAN)	2,881
N19	Bukit Antarabangsa	Mohamed Azmin Ali (PH-PKR)	30,892	25,512	Salwa Yunus (BN-UMNO)	5,380	Mohamed Azmin Ali (PH-PKR)	4,044
N19	Bukit Antarabangsa	Mohamed Azmin Ali (PH-PKR)	30,892	25,512	Syarifah Haslizah Syed Ariffin (GS-PAS)	2,311	Mohamed Azmin Ali (PH-PKR)	4,044
N19	Bukit Antarabangsa	Mohamed Azmin Ali (PH-PKR)	30,892	25,512	Ahmad Kamarudin (PRM)	116	Mohamed Azmin Ali (PH-PKR)	4,044
N19	Bukit Antarabangsa	Mohamed Azmin Ali (PH-PKR)	30,892	25,512	Mohamed Azwan Ali (IND)	90	Mohamed Azmin Ali (PH-PKR)	4,044
N20	Lembah Jaya	Haniza Mohamed Talha (PH-PKR)	22,512	14,790	Muhamad Nizam Shith (BN-UMNO)	7,722	Khasim Abdul Aziz (GS-PAS)	8,713
N20	Lembah Jaya	Haniza Mohamed Talha (PH-PKR)	22,512	14,790	Khasim Abdul Aziz (GS-PAS)	7,358	Khasim Abdul Aziz (GS-PAS)	8,713
N20	Lembah Jaya	Haniza Mohamed Talha (PH-PKR)	22,512	14,790	Norizwan Mohamed (PRM)	177	Khasim Abdul Aziz (GS-PAS)	8,713
N21	Pandan Indah (previously known as Chempaka)	Izham Hashim (PH-PAN)	24,914	16,386	Mohd Haniff Koslan (BN-UMNO)	8,528	Iskandar Abdul Samad (GS-PAS)	9,608
N21	Pandan Indah (previously known as Chempaka)	Izham Hashim (PH-PAN)	24,914	16,386	Iskandar Abdul Samad (GS-PAS)	7,517	Iskandar Abdul Samad (GS-PAS)	9,608
N22	Teratai	Lai Wai Chong (PH-DAP)	34,453	29,425	Mohd Irman Abdul Wahab (GS-PAS)	5,028	Tiew Way Keng (PH-DAP)	13,646
N22	Teratai	Lai Wai Chong (PH-DAP)	34,453	29,425	Liew Pok Boon (BN-GERAKAN)	4,784	Tiew Way Keng (PH-DAP)	13,646
N22	Teratai	Lai Wai Chong (PH-DAP)	34,453	29,425	Jenice Lee Ying Ha (PRM)	529	Tiew Way Keng (PH-DAP)	13,646
N23	Dusun Tua	Edry Faizal Eddy Yusof (PH-DAP)	22,325	10,422	Mohd Zin Isa (BN-UMNO)	11,903	Razaly Hassan (GS-PAS)	4,071
N23	Dusun Tua	Edry Faizal Eddy Yusof (PH-DAP)	22,325	10,422	Razaly Hassan (GS-PAS)	7,771	Razaly Hassan (GS-PAS)	4,071
N24	Semenyih	Bakhtiar Mohd Nor (PH-PPBM)	23,428	8,964	Johan Abd Aziz (BN-UMNO)	14,464	Johan Abd Aziz (BN-UMNO)	4,757
N24	Semenyih	Bakhtiar Mohd Nor (PH-PPBM)	23,428	8,964	Mad Shahmidur Mat Kosim (GS-PAS)	6,966	Johan Abd Aziz (BN-UMNO)	4,757
N24	Semenyih	Bakhtiar Mohd Nor (PH-PPBM)	23,428	8,964	Arutchelvan Subramaniams (PSM)	1,293	Johan Abd Aziz (BN-UMNO)	4,757
N25	Kajang	Hee Loy Sian (PH-PKR)	39,055	30,755	Zaiton Ahmad (GS-PAS)	8,300	Wan Azizah Wan Ismail (PH-PKR)	6,824
N25	Kajang	Hee Loy Sian (PH-PKR)	39,055	30,755	Teh Yeow Meng (BN-MCA)	7,097	Wan Azizah Wan Ismail (PH-PKR)	6,824
N25	Kajang	Hee Loy Sian (PH-PKR)	39,055	30,755	Dennis Wan Jinn Woei (PRM)	103	Wan Azizah Wan Ismail (PH-PKR)	6,824
N26	Sungai Ramal (previously known as Bangi)	Mazwan Johar (PH-PAN)	24,591	10,630	Nushi Mahfodz (GS-PAS)	13,961	Mohd Shafie Ngah (GS-PAS)	11,838
N26	Sungai Ramal (previously known as Bangi)	Mazwan Johar (PH-PAN)	24,591	10,630	Abdul Rahim Mohd Amin (BN-UMNO)	9,372	Mohd Shafie Ngah (GS-PAS)	11,838
N27	Balakong	Eddie Ng Tien Chee (PH-DAP)	41,768	35,538	Mohamad Ibrahim Ghazali (GS-PAS)	6,230	Eddie Ng Tien Chee (PH-DAP)	13,542
N27	Balakong	Eddie Ng Tien Chee (PH-DAP)	41,768	35,538	Lim Chin Wah (BN-MCA)	5,874	Eddie Ng Tien Chee (PH-DAP)	13,542
N28	Seri Kembangan	Ean Yong Hian Wah (PH-DAP)	34,659	31,145	Chang Toong Woh (BN-MCA)	3,514	Ean Yong Hian Wah (PH-DAP)	22,078
N29	Seri Serdang	Siti Mariah Mahmud (PH-PAN)	27,088	14,363	Mohamad Satim Diman (BN-UMNO)	12,725	Noor Hanim Ismail (GS-PAS)	16,251
N29	Seri Serdang	Siti Mariah Mahmud (PH-PAN)	27,088	14,363	Noor Hanim Ismail (GS-PAS)	5,552	Noor Hanim Ismail (GS-PAS)	16,251
N30	Kinrara	Ng Sze Han (PH-DAP)	52,207	45,212	Chiew Kai Heng (BN-MCA)	6,995	Ng Sze Han (PH-DAP)	14,604
N30	Kinrara	Ng Sze Han (PH-DAP)	52,207	45,212	Lim Ying Ran (GS-IKATAN)	3,732	Ng Sze Han (PH-DAP)	14,604
N31	Subang Jaya	Michelle Ng Mei Sze (PH-DAP)	55,354	48,272	Chong Ah Watt (BN-MCA)	7,082	Hannah Yeoh Tseow Suan (PH-DAP)	28,069
N31	Subang Jaya	Michelle Ng Mei Sze (PH-DAP)	55,354	48,272	Toh Sin Wah (IND)	228	Hannah Yeoh Tseow Suan (PH-DAP)	28,069
N32	Seri Setia	Shaharuddin Badaruddin (PH-PKR)	29,250	19,372	Yusoff M. Haniff (BN-UMNO)	9,878	Nik Nazmi Nik Ahmad (PH-PKR)	4,663
N32	Seri Setia	Shaharuddin Badaruddin (PH-PKR)	29,250	19,372	Mohd Ghazali Daud (GS-PAS)	4,563	Nik Nazmi Nik Ahmad (PH-PKR)	4,663
N32	Seri Setia	Shaharuddin Badaruddin (PH-PKR)	29,250	19,372	Vigneswaran T. Subramaniam (IND)	217	Nik Nazmi Nik Ahmad (PH-PKR)	4,663
N33	Taman Medan	Syamsul Firdaus Mohamed Supri (PH-PKR)	21,712	10,940	Abdul Mutalif Abd Rahim (BN-UMNO)	10,772	Haniza Mohamed Talha (PH-PKR)	3,731
N33	Taman Medan	Syamsul Firdaus Mohamed Supri (PH-PKR)	21,712	10,940	Ariffin Mahaiyuddin (GS-PAS)	5,090	Haniza Mohamed Talha (PH-PKR)	3,731
N34	Bukit Gasing	Rajiv Rishyakaran (PH-DAP)	29,366	25,835	Chai Ko Thing (BN-GERAKAN)	3,531	Rajiv Rishyakaran (PH-DAP)	15,842
N34	Bukit Gasing	Rajiv Rishyakaran (PH-DAP)	29,366	25,835	David Sew Kah Heng (GS-IKATAN)	890	Rajiv Rishyakaran (PH-DAP)	15,842
N35	Kampung Tunku	Lim Yi Wei (PH-DAP)	34,477	30,444	Tam Gim Tuan (BN-MCA)	4,033	Lau Weng San (PH-DAP)	13,685
N36	Bandar Utama (previously known as Damansara Utama)	Jamaliah Jamaluddin (PH-DAP)	38,651	34,769	Ch'ng Soo Chau (BN-MCA)	3,882	Yeo Bee Yin (PH-DAP)	30,689
N36	Bandar Utama (previously known as Damansara Utama)	Jamaliah Jamaluddin (PH-DAP)	38,651	34,769	Chong Fook Meng (IND)	188	Yeo Bee Yin (PH-DAP)	30,689
N37	Bukit Lanjan	Elizabeth Wong Keat Ping (PH-PKR)	47,748	40,233	Syed Abdul Razak Syed Long Alsagof (BN-GERAKAN)	7,515	Elizabeth Wong Keat Ping (PH-PKR)	17,200
N38	Paya Jaras	Mohd Khairuddin Othman (PH-PKR)	20,376	12,072	Zein Isma Ismail (BN-UMNO)	8,304	Mohd Khairuddin Othman (GS-PAS)	5,522
N38	Paya Jaras	Mohd Khairuddin Othman (PH-PKR)	20,376	12,072	Hanafi Zulkapli (GS-PAS)	6,042	Mohd Khairuddin Othman (GS-PAS)	5,522
N39	Kota Damansara	Shatiri Mansor (PH-PKR)	26,440	15,703	Halimaton Saadiah Bohan (BN-UMNO)	10,737	Halimaton Saadiah Bohan (BN-UMNO)	1,527
N39	Kota Damansara	Shatiri Mansor (PH-PKR)	26,440	15,703	Siti Rohaya Ahad (GS-PAS)	5,633	Halimaton Saadiah Bohan (BN-UMNO)	1,527
N39	Kota Damansara	Shatiri Mansor (PH-PKR)	26,440	15,703	Sivarajan Arumugam (PSM)	435	Halimaton Saadiah Bohan (BN-UMNO)	1,527
N40	Kota Anggerik	Najwan Halimi (PH-PKR)	26,947	17,004	Ahmad Dusuki Abd Rani (GS-PAS)	9,943	Yaakob Sapari (PH-PKR)	4,503
N40	Kota Anggerik	Najwan Halimi (PH-PKR)	26,947	17,004	Jumaeah Masdi (BN-UMNO)	8,924	Yaakob Sapari (PH-PKR)	4,503
N41	Batu Tiga	Rodziah Ismail (PH-PKR)	27,638	15,616	Ahmad Mu'adzam Shah Ya'akop (BN-UMNO)	12,022	Rodziah Ismail (PH-PKR)	3,805
N41	Batu Tiga	Rodziah Ismail (PH-PKR)	27,638	15,616	Abdul Halim Omar (GS-PAS)	7,793	Rodziah Ismail (PH-PKR)	3,805
N42	Meru	Mohd Fakhrulrazi Mohd Mokhtar (PH-PAN)	17,665	9,608	Khairul Anuar Saimun (BN-UMNO)	8,057	Abd Rani Osman (GS-PAS)	9,079
N42	Meru	Mohd Fakhrulrazi Mohd Mokhtar (PH-PAN)	17,665	9,608	Noor Najhan Mohd Salleh (GS-PAS)	7,804	Abd Rani Osman (GS-PAS)	9,079
N42	Meru	Mohd Fakhrulrazi Mohd Mokhtar (PH-PAN)	17,665	9,608	Manikavasagam Sundram (PRM)	346	Abd Rani Osman (GS-PAS)	9,079
N42	Meru	Mohd Fakhrulrazi Mohd Mokhtar (PH-PAN)	17,665	9,608	Shee Chee Weng (IND)	72	Abd Rani Osman (GS-PAS)	9,079
N43	Sementa	Daroyah Alwi (PH-PKR)	17,867	5,370	Saroni Judi (BN-UMNO)	12,497	Daroyah Alwi (PH-PKR)	7,846
N43	Sementa	Daroyah Alwi (PH-PKR)	17,867	5,370	Wan Hasrina Wan Hassan (GS-PAS)	7,696	Daroyah Alwi (PH-PKR)	7,846
N43	Sementa	Daroyah Alwi (PH-PKR)	17,867	5,370	Gandhi Nagamuthu (PRM)	120	Daroyah Alwi (PH-PKR)	7,846
N44	Selat Klang	Abdul Rashid Asari (PH-PPBM)	12,266	500	Halimah Ali (GS-PAS)	11,766	Halimah Ali (GS-PAS)	2,754
N44	Selat Klang	Abdul Rashid Asari (PH-PPBM)	12,266	500	Mohd Khairi Hussin (BN-UMNO)	9,949	Halimah Ali (GS-PAS)	2,754
N44	Selat Klang	Abdul Rashid Asari (PH-PPBM)	12,266	500	Jeichandran Wadivelu (PRM)	52	Halimah Ali (GS-PAS)	2,754
N44	Selat Klang	Abdul Rashid Asari (PH-PPBM)	12,266	500	Zainal Azwar Kamaruddin (IND)	49	Halimah Ali (GS-PAS)	2,754
N45	Bandar Baru Klang (previously known as Sungai Pinang)	Teng Chang Khim (PH-DAP)	44,926	39,828	Teoh Kah Yeong (BN-MCA)	5,098	Teng Chang Khim (PH-DAP)	11,309
N46	Pelabuhan Klang	Azmizam Zaman Huri (PH-PKR)	15,837	6,422	Seikh Rajesh Seikh Ahmad (BN-UMNO)	9,415	Abdul Khalid Ibrahim (IND)	2,994
N46	Pelabuhan Klang	Azmizam Zaman Huri (PH-PKR)	15,837	6,422	Khalid Nayan (GS-PAS)	2,925	Abdul Khalid Ibrahim (IND)	2,994
N46	Pelabuhan Klang	Azmizam Zaman Huri (PH-PKR)	15,837	6,422	Shanmugasundram Veerappan (PSM)	128	Abdul Khalid Ibrahim (IND)	2,994
N47	Pandamaran	Leong Tuck Chee (PH-DAP)	41,552	35,863	Tee Hooi Ling (BN-MCA)	5,689	Tan Pok Shyong (PH-DAP)	9,176
N47	Pandamaran	Leong Tuck Chee (PH-DAP)	41,552	35,863	G.S. Santokh Singh (GS-IKATAN)	1,459	Tan Pok Shyong (PH-DAP)	9,176
N48	Sentosa (previously known as Kota Alam Shah)	Gunarajah R. George (PH-PKR)	38,106	33,600	R. Subramaniam (BN-MIC)	4,506	Ganabatirau Veraman (PH-DAP)	13,369
N48	Sentosa (previously known as Kota Alam Shah)	Gunarajah R. George (PH-PKR)	38,106	33,600	Rajan Manikesavan (GS-PAS)	1,722	Ganabatirau Veraman (PH-DAP)	13,369
N48	Sentosa (previously known as Kota Alam Shah)	Gunarajah R. George (PH-PKR)	38,106	33,600	Sundarajoo A. Periasamy (IND)	95	Ganabatirau Veraman (PH-DAP)	13,369
N48	Sentosa (previously known as Kota Alam Shah)	Gunarajah R. George (PH-PKR)	38,106	33,600	M. Telai Amblam (PRM)	79	Ganabatirau Veraman (PH-DAP)	13,369
N49	Sungai Kandis (previously known as Seri Andalas)	Mat Shuhaimi Shafiei (PH-PKR)	23,998	12,480	Kamaruzzaman Johari (BN-UMNO)	11,518	Xavier Jayakumar Arulanandam (PH-PKR)	15,633
N49	Sungai Kandis (previously known as Seri Andalas)	Mat Shuhaimi Shafiei (PH-PKR)	23,998	12,480	Mohd Yusof Abdullah (GS-PAS)	7,573	Xavier Jayakumar Arulanandam (PH-PKR)	15,633
N49	Sungai Kandis (previously known as Seri Andalas)	Mat Shuhaimi Shafiei (PH-PKR)	23,998	12,480	Hanafiah Husin (PRM)	76	Xavier Jayakumar Arulanandam (PH-PKR)	15,633
N50	Kota Kemuning (previously known as Sri Muda)	Ganabatirau Veraman (PH-DAP)	28,617	21,639	Burhan Adnan (GS-PAS)	6,978	Mat Shuhaimi Shafiei (PH-PKR)	12,510
N50	Kota Kemuning (previously known as Sri Muda)	Ganabatirau Veraman (PH-DAP)	28,617	21,639	Tiew Hock Huat (BN-GERAKAN)	4,601	Mat Shuhaimi Shafiei (PH-PKR)	12,510
N50	Kota Kemuning (previously known as Sri Muda)	Ganabatirau Veraman (PH-DAP)	28,617	21,639	Abdul Razak Ismail (PSM)	226	Mat Shuhaimi Shafiei (PH-PKR)	12,510
N50	Kota Kemuning (previously known as Sri Muda)	Ganabatirau Veraman (PH-DAP)	28,617	21,639	Rajasekaran Soundaparandy (IND)	93	Mat Shuhaimi Shafiei (PH-PKR)	12,510
N51	Sijangkang	Ahmad Yunus Hairi (GS-PAS)	12,688	1,677	Mohd Hamidi Abu Bakar (PH-PPBM)	11,011	Ahmad Yunus Hairi (GS-PAS)	2,942
N51	Sijangkang	Ahmad Yunus Hairi (GS-PAS)	12,688	1,677	Sulaiman Mohd Karli (BN-UMNO)	10,420	Ahmad Yunus Hairi (GS-PAS)	2,942
N52	Banting (previously known as Teluk Datuk)	Lau Weng San (PH-DAP)	21,846	17,299	Ng Siok Hwa (BN-MCA)	4,547	Loh Chee Heng (IND)	5,391
N52	Banting (previously known as Teluk Datuk)	Lau Weng San (PH-DAP)	21,846	17,299	Philip Tan Choon Swee (PRM)	311	Loh Chee Heng (IND)	5,391
N53	Morib	Hasnul Baharuddin (PH-PAN)	11,000	2,117	Rozana Kamarulzaman (BN-UMNO)	8,883	Hasnul Baharuddin (PH-PAN)	766
N53	Morib	Hasnul Baharuddin (PH-PAN)	11,000	2,117	Mohammad Sallehuddin Hafiz (GS-PAS)	7,329	Hasnul Baharuddin (PH-PAN)	766
N54	Tanjong Sepat	Borhan Aman Shah (PH-PKR)	9,828	2,704	Karim Mansor (BN-UMNO)	7,124	Mohd Haslin Hassan (GS-PAS)	682
N54	Tanjong Sepat	Borhan Aman Shah (PH-PKR)	9,828	2,704	Mohd Haslin Hassan (GS-PAS)	4,273	Mohd Haslin Hassan (GS-PAS)	682
N55	Dengkil	Adhif Syan Abdullah (PH-PPBM)	21,172	6,934	Shahrum Mohd Sharif (BN-UMNO)	14,238	Shahrum Mohd Sharif (BN-UMNO)	2,317
N55	Dengkil	Adhif Syan Abdullah (PH-PPBM)	21,172	6,934	Yusmi Haniff Ariffin (GS-PAS)	8,422	Shahrum Mohd Sharif (BN-UMNO)	2,317
N56	Sungai Pelek	Ronnie Liu Tian Khiew (PH-DAP)	13,484	6,586	Ng Chok Sin (BN-MCA)	6,898	Lai Nyuk Lan (PH-DAP)	1,972
N56	Sungai Pelek	Ronnie Liu Tian Khiew (PH-DAP)	13,484	6,586	Rohaya Mohd Shahir (GS-PAS)	5,200	Lai Nyuk Lan (PH-DAP)	1,972
N56	Sungai Pelek	Ronnie Liu Tian Khiew (PH-DAP)	13,484	6,586	Harry Arul Raj Krishnan (PAP)	79	Lai Nyuk Lan (PH-DAP)	1,972

== Negeri Sembilan ==
#	Constituency	Winner	Votes	Majority	Opponent(s)	Votes	Incumbent	Incumbent Majority
BN 16 | GS 0 | PH 20 | Independent 0
N1	Chennah	Anthony Loke Siew Fook (PH-DAP)	5,031	1,155	Seet Tee Gee (BN-MCA)	3,876	Anthony Loke Siew Fook (PH-DAP)	1,098
N1	Chennah	Anthony Loke Siew Fook (PH-DAP)	5,031	1,155	Jamalus Mansor (GS-PAS)	975	Anthony Loke Siew Fook (PH-DAP)	1,098
N2	Pertang	Noor Azmi Yusuf (BN-UMNO)	4,008	415	Osman Mohd Dusa (PH-PPBM)	3,593	Jalaluddin Alias (BN-UMNO)	2,163
N2	Pertang	Noor Azmi Yusuf (BN-UMNO)	4,008	415	Hamran Abu Hassan (GS-PAS)	578	Jalaluddin Alias (BN-UMNO)	2,163
N3	Sungai Lui	Mohd Razi Mohd Ali (BN-UMNO)	7,795	4,399	Zainal Fikri Abd Kadir (PH-PKR)	3,396	Mohd Razi Mohd Ali (BN-UMNO)	5,990
N3	Sungai Lui	Mohd Razi Mohd Ali (BN-UMNO)	7,795	4,399	Abdul Karim Shahimi Abdul Razak (GS-PAS)	1,269	Mohd Razi Mohd Ali (BN-UMNO)	5,990
N4	Kelawang	Bakri Sawir (PH-PAN)	4,296	976	Baharuddin Jali (BN-UMNO)	3,320	Yunus Rahmat (BN-UMNO)	282
N4	Kelawang	Bakri Sawir (PH-PAN)	4,296	976	Mazly Yasin (GS-PAS)	744	Yunus Rahmat (BN-UMNO)	282
N5	Serting	Shamshulkahar Mohd. Deli (BN-UMNO)	9,782	3,768	Abd Rahman Ramli (PH-PAN)	6,014	Shamshulkahar Mohd Deli (BN-UMNO)	5,442
N5	Serting	Shamshulkahar Mohd. Deli (BN-UMNO)	9,782	3,768	Muhammad Alzukri Muhammad Yasin (GS-PAS)	1,837	Shamshulkahar Mohd Deli (BN-UMNO)	5,442
N6	Palong	Mustafa Nagoor (BN-UMNO)	9,575	6,246	Nor Arzemi Nordin (PH-PPBM)	3,329	Lilah Yasin (BN-UMNO)	8,456
N6	Palong	Mustafa Nagoor (BN-UMNO)	9,575	6,246	Masdi Musa (GS-PAS)	1,571	Lilah Yasin (BN-UMNO)	8,456
N7	Jeram Padang	Manickam Letchuman (BN-MIC)	3,702	1,062	Surash S. Sreenivasan (IND)	2,640	Manickam Letchuman (BN-MIC)	2,691
N7	Jeram Padang	Manickam Letchuman (BN-MIC)	3,702	1,062	S. Musliadi Sabtu (PH-PKR)	2,302	Manickam Letchuman (BN-MIC)	2,691
N7	Jeram Padang	Manickam Letchuman (BN-MIC)	3,702	1,062	Mohd Fairuz Mohd Isa (GS-PAS)	785	Manickam Letchuman (BN-MIC)	2,691
N8	Bahau	Teo Kok Seong (PH-DAP)	10,094	6,109	Choong Wan You (BN-MCA)	3,985	Chew Seh Yong (PH-DAP)	5,136
N8	Bahau	Teo Kok Seong (PH-DAP)	10,094	6,109	Mustafar Bakri Abdul Aziz (GS-PAS)	1,512	Chew Seh Yong (PH-DAP)	5,136
N9	Lenggeng	Suhaimi Kassim (PH-PAN)	7,456	986	Mazlan Maarop (BN-UMNO)	6,470	Vacant	2,058
N9	Lenggeng	Suhaimi Kassim (PH-PAN)	7,456	986	Muhammad Ghazali Abu Bakar (GS-PAS)	1,612	Vacant	2,058
N10	Nilai	Arul Kumar Jambunathan (PH-DAP)	14,219	9,825	Leaw Kok Chan (BN-MCA)	4,394	Arul Kumar Jambunathan (PH-DAP)	4,047
N10	Nilai	Arul Kumar Jambunathan (PH-DAP)	14,219	9,825	Mohd Abu Zahrim Abd Rahman (GS-PAS)	2,151	Arul Kumar Jambunathan (PH-DAP)	4,047
N11	Lobak	Chew Seh Yong (PH-DAP)	13,647	11,782	Lim Kok Kean (BN-MCA)	1,865	Siow Kim Leong (PH-DAP)	8,270
N11	Lobak	Chew Seh Yong (PH-DAP)	13,647	11,782	Balamurugan Sanmugam (PAP)	92	Siow Kim Leong (PH-DAP)	8,270
N12	Temiang	Ng Chin Tsai (PH-DAP)	5,894	3,063	Siow Koi Voon (BN-MCA)	2,831	Ng Chin Tsai (PH-DAP)	1,677
N12	Temiang	Ng Chin Tsai (PH-DAP)	5,894	3,063	Yaw Con Seng (GS-PAS)	369	Ng Chin Tsai (PH-DAP)	1,677
N13	Sikamat	Aminuddin Harun (PH-PKR)	9,832	3,413	Syamsul Amri Ismail (BN-UMNO)	6,419	Aminuddin Harun (PH-PKR)	510
N13	Sikamat	Aminuddin Harun (PH-PKR)	9,832	3,413	Rahim Yusof (GS-PAS)	1,331	Aminuddin Harun (PH-PKR)	510
N13	Sikamat	Aminuddin Harun (PH-PKR)	9,832	3,413	Bujang Abu (IND)	15	Aminuddin Harun (PH-PKR)	510
N14	Ampangan	Mohamad Rafie Abdul Malek (PH-PKR)	6,801	1,360	Abu Ubaidah Redza (BN-UMNO)	5,441	Abu Ubaidah Redza (BN-UMNO)	89
N14	Ampangan	Mohamad Rafie Abdul Malek (PH-PKR)	6,801	1,360	Mustaffa Daharun (GS-PAS)	983	Abu Ubaidah Redza (BN-UMNO)	89
N15	Juasseh	Ismail Lasim (BN-UMNO)	4,146	692	Rosli Omar (PH-PKR)	3,454	Mohammad Razi Kail (BN-UMNO)	1,688
N15	Juasseh	Ismail Lasim (BN-UMNO)	4,146	692	Hassan Mohamed (GS-PAS)	624	Mohammad Razi Kail (BN-UMNO)	1,688
N16	Seri Menanti	Abdul Samad Ibrahim (BN-UMNO)	3,362	595	Jamali Salam (PH-PPBM)	2,767	Abdul Samad Ibrahim (BN-UMNO)	2,396
N16	Seri Menanti	Abdul Samad Ibrahim (BN-UMNO)	3,362	595	Rafiei Mustapha (GS-PAS)	535	Abdul Samad Ibrahim (BN-UMNO)	2,396
N17	Senaling	Adnan Abu Hasan (BN-UMNO)	3,456	972	Md Rais Mohamad @ Basiron (PH-PAN)	2,484	Ismail Lasim (BN-UMNO)	2,151
N17	Senaling	Adnan Abu Hasan (BN-UMNO)	3,456	972	Fazilah Abu Samah (GS-PAS)	598	Ismail Lasim (BN-UMNO)	2,151
N18	Pilah	Mohamad Nazaruddin Sabtu (PH-PKR)	5,643	1,806	Norhayati Omar (BN-UMNO)	3,837	Norhayati Omar (BN-UMNO)	113
N18	Pilah	Mohamad Nazaruddin Sabtu (PH-PKR)	5,643	1,806	Ahmad Fadzil Othman (GS-PAS)	1,413	Norhayati Omar (BN-UMNO)	113
N19	Johol	Saiful Yazan Sulaiman (BN-UMNO)	3,907	965	Zulkefly Mohamad Omar (PH-PAN)	2,942	Abu Samah Mahat (BN-UMNO)	1,344
N19	Johol	Saiful Yazan Sulaiman (BN-UMNO)	3,907	965	Kamaruddin Md Tahir (GS-PAS)	1,069	Abu Samah Mahat (BN-UMNO)	1,344
N20	Labu	Ismail Ahmad (PH-PKR)	6,712	882	Hasim Rusdi (BN-UMNO)	5,830	Hasim Rusdi (BN-UMNO)	1,511
N20	Labu	Ismail Ahmad (PH-PKR)	6,712	882	Khairil Anuar Mohd Wafa (GS-PAS)	2,093	Hasim Rusdi (BN-UMNO)	1,511
N20	Labu	Ismail Ahmad (PH-PKR)	6,712	882	David Dass Aseerpatham (PAP)	46	Hasim Rusdi (BN-UMNO)	1,511
N21	Bukit Kepayang	Nicole Tan Lee Koon (PH-DAP)	18,668	14,924	Mah Kah Yong (BN-GERAKAN)	3,744	Cha Kee Chin (PH-DAP)	9,457
N22	Rahang	Mary Josephine Pritam Singh (PH-DAP)	10,018	6,560	Yap Sui Moi (BN-MCA)	3,458	Mary Josephine Pritam Singh (PH-DAP)	1,964
N22	Rahang	Mary Josephine Pritam Singh (PH-DAP)	10,018	6,560	Saraswathy Paragazum (PAP)	66	Mary Josephine Pritam Singh (PH-DAP)	1,964
N23	Mambau	Yap Yew Weng (PH-DAP)	14,911	12,389	Hoi Choi Sin (BN-MCA)	2,522	Yap Yew Weng (PH-DAP)	9,377
N23	Mambau	Yap Yew Weng (PH-DAP)	14,911	12,389	T. Parimala Devi (PAP)	101	Yap Yew Weng (PH-DAP)	9,377
N24	Seremban Jaya (previously known as Senawang)	Gunasekaren Palasamy (PH-DAP)	13,760	10,507	Choong Vee Hing (BN-GERAKAN)	3,253	Gunasekaren Palasamy (PH-DAP)	4,805
N24	Seremban Jaya (previously known as Senawang)	Gunasekaren Palasamy (PH-DAP)	13,760	10,507	Sagaya Rajan Xavier (PAP)	99	Gunasekaren Palasamy (PH-DAP)	4,805
N25	Paroi	Mohamad Taufek Abd Ghani (PH-PAN)	16,038	4,841	Mohd Ghazali Wahid (BN-UMNO)	11,197	Mohd Ghazali Wahid (BN-UMNO)	2,184
N25	Paroi	Mohamad Taufek Abd Ghani (PH-PAN)	16,038	4,841	Masita Mohamed Ali (GS-PAS)	3,499	Mohd Ghazali Wahid (BN-UMNO)	2,184
N26	Chembong	Zaifulbahri Idris (BN-UMNO)	9,079	4,427	Azizan Marzuki (PH-PPBM)	4,652	Zaifulbahri Idris (BN-UMNO)	6,480
N26	Chembong	Zaifulbahri Idris (BN-UMNO)	9,079	4,427	Rosmin Adam (GS-PAS)	1,288	Zaifulbahri Idris (BN-UMNO)	6,480
N27	Rantau	Mohamad Hasan (BN-UMNO)	-		Unopposed	N/A	Mohamad Hasan (BN-UMNO)	4,613
N28	Kota	Awaludin Said (BN-UMNO)	6,356	2,969	Shahrizal Masrudin (PH-PAN)	3,387	Awaludin Said (BN-UMNO)	5,002
N28	Kota	Awaludin Said (BN-UMNO)	6,356	2,969	Ishak Omar (GS-PAS)	1,333	Awaludin Said (BN-UMNO)	5,002
N29	Chuah	Michael Yek Diew Ching (PH-PKR)	6,661	3,201	Lim Chin Sui (BN-MCA)	3,460	Chai Tong Chai (PH-PKR)	2,534
N30	Lukut	Choo Ken Hwa (PH-DAP)	11,449	8,405	Yeong Con Yu (BN-MCA)	3,044	Ean Yong Tin Sin (PH-DAP)	3,954
N31	Bagan Pinang	Tun Hairuddin Abu Bakar (BN-UMNO)	7,146	1,935	Rashid Latiff (PH-PPBM)	5,211	Tun Hairuddin Abu Bakar (BN-UMNO)	6,067
N32	Linggi	Abdul Rahman Mohd Redza (BN-UMNO)	6,072	623	Rusli Abdullah (PH-PKR)	5,449	Abdul Rahman Mohd Redza (BN-UMNO)	3,260
N32	Linggi	Abdul Rahman Mohd Redza (BN-UMNO)	6,072	623	Noor Mohamad Rizal Ishak (GS-PAS)	992	Abdul Rahman Mohd Redza (BN-UMNO)	3,260
N33	Sri Tanjung (previously known as Port Dickson)	Ravi Munusamy (PH-PKR)	7,366	4,030	Thinalan T. Rojagapalu (BN-MIC)	3,336	Ravi Munusamy (PH-PKR)	2,422
N33	Sri Tanjung (previously known as Port Dickson)	Ravi Munusamy (PH-PKR)	7,366	4,030	Kamarol Ridzuan Mohd Zain (GS-PAS)	1,061	Ravi Munusamy (PH-PKR)	2,422
N34	Gemas	Abdul Razak Said (BN-UMNO)	9,853	4,772	Baharuddin Arif Siri (PH-PKR)	5,081	Abd Razak Said (BN-UMNO)	10,911
N34	Gemas	Abdul Razak Said (BN-UMNO)	9,853	4,772	Abdul Halim Abu Bakar (GS-PAS)	2,612	Abd Razak Said (BN-UMNO)	10,911
N35	Gemencheh	Mohd Isam Mohd Isa (BN-UMNO)	6,963	351	Saiful Adly Abdul Wahab (PH-PPBM)	6,612	Mohd Isam Mohd Isa (BN-UMNO)	3,025
N35	Gemencheh	Mohd Isam Mohd Isa (BN-UMNO)	6,963	351	Ishak Maasin (GS-PAS)	1,122	Mohd Isam Mohd Isa (BN-UMNO)	3,025
N36	Repah	Veerapan Superamaniam (PH-DAP)	9,568	4,758	Pui Kim Swee (BN-MCA)	4,810	Veerapan Superamaniam (PH-DAP)	1,944
N36	Repah	Veerapan Superamaniam (PH-DAP)	9,568	4,758	Abdul Razakek Abdul Rahim (GS-PAS)	1,957	Veerapan Superamaniam (PH-DAP)	1,944

== Malacca ==
#	Constituency	Winner	Votes	Majority	Opponent(s)	Votes	Incumbent	Incumbent Majority
BN 13 | GS 0 | PH 15 | Independent 0
N1	Kuala Linggi	Ismail Othman (BN-UMNO)	4,812	1,372	Hasmorni Tamby (PH-PKR)	3,440	Ismail Othman (BN-UMNO)	2,431
N1	Kuala Linggi	Ismail Othman (BN-UMNO)	4,812	1,372	Azmi Sambul (GS-PAS)	941	Ismail Othman (BN-UMNO)	2,431
N2	Tanjung Bidara	Md Rawi Mahmud (BN-UMNO)	4,865	2,864	Halim Bachik (PH-PKR)	2,001	Md Rawi Mahmud (BN-UMNO)	4,240
N2	Tanjung Bidara	Md Rawi Mahmud (BN-UMNO)	4,865	2,864	Imran Abdul Rahman (GS-PAS)	1,501	Md Rawi Mahmud (BN-UMNO)	4,240
N3	Ayer Limau	Amiruddin Yusop (BN-UMNO)	4,704	1,479	Ruslin Hasan (PH-PPBM)	3,225	Amiruddin Yusop (BN-UMNO)	4,569
N3	Ayer Limau	Amiruddin Yusop (BN-UMNO)	4,704	1,479	Jamarudin Ahmad (GS-PAS)	1,187	Amiruddin Yusop (BN-UMNO)	4,569
N4	Lendu	Sulaiman Md Ali (BN-UMNO)	4,016	627	Riduan Affandi Abu Bakar (PH-PPBM)	3,389	Sulaiman Md Ali (BN-UMNO)	2,503
N4	Lendu	Sulaiman Md Ali (BN-UMNO)	4,016	627	Arshad Mohamad Som (GS-PAS)	1,163	Sulaiman Md Ali (BN-UMNO)	2,503
N5	Taboh Naning	Latipah Omar (BN-UMNO)	3,329	740	Zairi Suboh (PH-PAN)	2,589	Latipah Omar (BN-UMNO)	2,355
N5	Taboh Naning	Latipah Omar (BN-UMNO)	3,329	740	Asri Shaik Abdul Aziz (GS-PAS)	1,111	Latipah Omar (BN-UMNO)	2,355
N6	Rembia	Muhammad Jailani Khamis (PH-PKR)	6,773	1,814	Norpipah Abdol (BN-UMNO)	4,959	Norpipah Abdol (BN-UMNO)	2,358
N6	Rembia	Muhammad Jailani Khamis (PH-PKR)	6,773	1,814	Mohammad Rashidi Abd Radzak (GS-PAS)	1,200	Norpipah Abdol (BN-UMNO)	2,358
N7	Gadek	Saminathan Ganesan (PH-DAP)	4,392	307	Panirchelvam P. Pichamuthu (BN-MIC)	4,085	Mahadevan M. Sanacy (BN-MIC)	2,630
N7	Gadek	Saminathan Ganesan (PH-DAP)	4,392	307	Emransyah Ismail (GS-PAS)	1,865	Mahadevan M. Sanacy (BN-MIC)	2,630
N8	Machap Jaya (previously known as Machap)	Ginie Lim Siew Lin (PH-PKR)	5,550	1,336	Koh Nai Kwong (BN-MCA)	4,214	Lai Meng Chong (BN-MCA)	152
N8	Machap Jaya (previously known as Machap)	Ginie Lim Siew Lin (PH-PKR)	5,550	1,336	Wan Zahidi Wan Ismail (GS-PAS)	775	Lai Meng Chong (BN-MCA)	152
N9	Durian Tunggal	Mohd Sofi Abdul Wahab (PH-PAN)	5,213	763	Ab Wahab Ab Latip (BN-UMNO)	4,450	Ab Wahab Ab Latip (BN-UMNO)	1,316
N9	Durian Tunggal	Mohd Sofi Abdul Wahab (PH-PAN)	5,213	763	Mohsin Ibrahim (GS-PAS)	1,391	Ab Wahab Ab Latip (BN-UMNO)	1,316
N10	Asahan	Abdul Ghafar Atan (BN-UMNO)	5,942	275	Zamzuri Ariffin (PH-PPBM)	5,667	Abdul Ghafaar Atan (BN-UMNO)	3,857
N10	Asahan	Abdul Ghafar Atan (BN-UMNO)	5,942	275	Azlan Maddin (GS-PAS)	1,365	Abdul Ghafaar Atan (BN-UMNO)	3,857
N11	Sungai Udang	Idris Haron (BN-UMNO)	10,073	2,229	Mohd Lokman Abdul Gani (PH-PKR)	7,844	Idris Haron (BN-UMNO)	9,136
N12	Pantai Kundor	Nor Azman Hassan (BN-UMNO)	5,773	772	Juhari Osman (PH-PAN)	5,001	Ab Rahman Ab Karim (BN-UMNO)	3,064
N12	Pantai Kundor	Nor Azman Hassan (BN-UMNO)	5,773	772	Abdul Halim Maidin (GS-PAS)	1,936	Ab Rahman Ab Karim (BN-UMNO)	3,064
N13	Paya Rumput	Mohd Rafiq Naizamohideen (PH-PPBM)	12,102	4,259	Abu Bakar Mohamed Diah (BN-UMNO)	7,843	Sazali Muhd Din (BN-UMNO)	1,270
N13	Paya Rumput	Mohd Rafiq Naizamohideen (PH-PPBM)	12,102	4,259	Rafie Ahmad (GS-PAS)	1,552	Sazali Muhd Din (BN-UMNO)	1,270
N14	Kelebang	Gue Teck (PH-PKR)	7,648	789	Lim Ban Hong (BN-MCA)	6,859	Lim Ban Hong (BN-MCA)	2,097
N14	Kelebang	Gue Teck (PH-PKR)	7,648	789	Mohd Shafiq Ismail (GS-PAS)	2,272	Lim Ban Hong (BN-MCA)	2,097
N15	Pengkalan Batu (previously known as Bachang)	Norhizam Hassan Baktee (PH-DAP)	9,227	2,756	Chua Lian Chye (BN-GERAKAN)	6,471	Lim Jak Wong (IND)	2,627
N15	Pengkalan Batu (previously known as Bachang)	Norhizam Hassan Baktee (PH-DAP)	9,227	2,756	Ramli Dalip (GS-PAS)	2,230	Lim Jak Wong (IND)	2,627
N16	Ayer Keroh	Kerk Chee Yee (PH-DAP)	14,279	6,336	Chua Kheng Hwa (BN-MCA)	5,018	Khoo Poay Tiong (PH-DAP)	7,943
N16	Ayer Keroh	Kerk Chee Yee (PH-DAP)	14,279	6,336	Sepri Rahman (GS-PAS)	2,567	Khoo Poay Tiong (PH-DAP)	7,943
N17	Bukit Katil (previously known as Bukit Baru)	Adly Zahari (PH-PAN)	11,226	3,159	Yunus Hitam (BN-UMNO)	8,067	Md Khalid Kassim (PAS)	48
N17	Bukit Katil (previously known as Bukit Baru)	Adly Zahari (PH-PAN)	11,226	3,159	Muhamat Puhat Bedol (GS-PAS)	2,237	Md Khalid Kassim (PAS)	48
N18	Ayer Molek	Rahmad Mariman (BN-UMNO)	6,951	1,805	Farhan Ibrahim (PH-PKR)	5,146	Md Yunos Husin (BN-UMNO)	3,761
N18	Ayer Molek	Rahmad Mariman (BN-UMNO)	6,951	1,805	Jantan Abdullah (GS-PAS)	3,082	Md Yunos Husin (BN-UMNO)	3,761
N18	Ayer Molek	Rahmad Mariman (BN-UMNO)	6,951	1,805	Kamarolzaman Mohd Jidi (IND)	79	Md Yunos Husin (BN-UMNO)	3,761
N19	Kesidang	Seah Shoo Chin (PH-DAP)	22,880	14,612	Ng Choon Koon (BN-MCA)	8,268	Chin Choong Seong (IND)	3,818
N19	Kesidang	Seah Shoo Chin (PH-DAP)	22,880	14,612	Goh Leong San (IND)	349	Chin Choong Seong (IND)	3,818
N20	Kota Laksamana	Low Chee Leong (PH-DAP)	20,181	16,173	Melvia Chua Kew Wei (BN-MCA)	4,008	Lai Keun Ban (PH-DAP)	8,507
N20	Kota Laksamana	Low Chee Leong (PH-DAP)	20,181	16,173	Sim Tong Him (IND)	517	Lai Keun Ban (PH-DAP)	8,507
N21	Duyong	Damian Yeo Shen Li (PH-DAP)	7,642	2,895	Lee Kiat Lee (BN-MCA)	4,747	Goh Leong San (IND)	205
N21	Duyong	Damian Yeo Shen Li (PH-DAP)	7,642	2,895	Kamarudin Sedik (GS-PAS)	2,938	Goh Leong San (IND)	205
N21	Duyong	Damian Yeo Shen Li (PH-DAP)	7,642	2,895	Lim Jak Wong (IND)	62	Goh Leong San (IND)	205
N22	Bandar Hilir	Tey Kok Kiew (PH-DAP)	14,038	11,313	Lee Chong Meng (BN-MCA)	2,725	Tey Kok Kiew (PH-DAP)	7,952
N22	Bandar Hilir	Tey Kok Kiew (PH-DAP)	14,038	11,313	Chin Choong Seong (IND)	141	Tey Kok Kiew (PH-DAP)	7,952
N23	Telok Mas	Noor Effandi Ahmad (PH-PPBM)	7,694	1,288	Abdul Razak Abdul Rahman (BN-UMNO)	6,406	Latiff Tamby Chik (BN-UMNO)	701
N23	Telok Mas	Noor Effandi Ahmad (PH-PPBM)	7,694	1,288	Rosazli Md Yasin (GS-PAS)	3,164	Latiff Tamby Chik (BN-UMNO)	701
N24	Bemban	Wong Fort Pin (PH-DAP)	6,998	1,345	Koh Chin Han (BN-MCA)	5,653	Ng Choon Koon (BN-MCA)	2,028
N24	Bemban	Wong Fort Pin (PH-DAP)	6,998	1,345	Suhaimi Harun (GS-PAS)	2,762	Ng Choon Koon (BN-MCA)	2,028
N25	Rim	Ghazale Muhamad (BN-UMNO)	5,301	536	Shamsul Iskandar @ Yusre Mohd Akin (PH-PKR)	4,765	Ghazale Muhamad (BN-UMNO)	1,121
N25	Rim	Ghazale Muhamad (BN-UMNO)	5,301	536	Kintan Man (GS-PAS)	1,262	Ghazale Muhamad (BN-UMNO)	1,121
N26	Serkam	Zaidi Attan (BN-UMNO)	6,401	2,737	Nor Khairi Yusof (PH-PAN)	3,664	Zaidi Attan (BN-UMNO)	3,600
N26	Serkam	Zaidi Attan (BN-UMNO)	6,401	2,737	Ahmad Bilal Rahudin (GS-PAS)	3,423	Zaidi Attan (BN-UMNO)	3,600
N27	Merlimau	Roslan Ahmad (BN-UMNO)	5,290	130	Yuhaizad Abdullah (PH-PAN)	5,160	Roslan Ahmad (BN-UMNO)	2,589
N27	Merlimau	Roslan Ahmad (BN-UMNO)	5,290	130	Abd Malek Yusof (GS-PAS)	1,208	Roslan Ahmad (BN-UMNO)	2,589
N28	Sungai Rambai	Hasan Abd Rahman (BN-UMNO)	5,088	1,669	Azalina Abd Rahman (PH-PPBM)	3,419	Hasan Abd Rahman (BN-UMNO)	2,363
N28	Sungai Rambai	Hasan Abd Rahman (BN-UMNO)	5,088	1,669	Zakariya Kasnin (GS-PAS)	1,405	Hasan Abd Rahman (BN-UMNO)	2,363

== Johor ==
#	Constituency	Winner	Votes	Majority	Opponent(s)	Votes	Incumbent	Incumbent Majority
BN 19 | GS 1 | PH 36 | Independent 0
N1	Buloh Kasap	Zahari Sarip (BN-UMNO)	9,186	877	Norsamsu Mohd Yusof (PH-PPBM)	8,309	Norshida Ibrahim (BN-UMNO)	3,370
N2	Jementah	Tan Chen Choon (PH-DAP)	16,336	7,001	Chiam Yok Meng (BN-MCA)	9,335	Tan Chen Choon (PH-DAP)	2,196
N2	Jementah	Tan Chen Choon (PH-DAP)	16,336	7,001	Mazlan Ahmad (GS-PAS)	1,986	Tan Chen Choon (PH-DAP)	2,196
N3	Pemanis	Chong Fat Full (PH-PKR)	8,304	363	Koo Siaw Lee (BN-GERAKAN)	7,941	Lau Chin Hoon (BN-GERAKAN)	1,329
N3	Pemanis	Chong Fat Full (PH-PKR)	8,304	363	Normala Sudirman (GS-PAS)	2,151	Lau Chin Hoon (BN-GERAKAN)	1,329
N4	Kemelah	Sulaiman Mohd Nor (PH-PAN)	10,836	2,355	Anuar Abd Manap (BN-UMNO)	8,481	Ayub Rahmat (BN-UMNO)	2,260
N5	Tenang	Mohd Solihan Badri (PH-PPBM)	7,645	1,070	Mohd Azahar Ibrahim (BN-UMNO)	6,575	Mohd Azahar Ibrahim (BN-UMNO)	1,586
N5	Tenang	Mohd Solihan Badri (PH-PPBM)	7,645	1,070	Nasharudin Awang (GS-PAS)	794	Mohd Azahar Ibrahim (BN-UMNO)	1,586
N6	Bekok	Ramakrishnan Suppiah (PH-DAP)	9,705	2,457	Tan Chong (BN-MCA)	7,248	Lim Eng Guan (PH-DAP)	1,401
N7	Bukit Kepong (previously known as Bukit Serampang)	Sahruddin Jamal (PH-PPBM)	11,665	1,273	Mohd Noor Taib (BN-UMNO)	10,392	Ismail Mohamed (BN-UMNO)	7,845
N7	Bukit Kepong (previously known as Bukit Serampang)	Sahruddin Jamal (PH-PPBM)	11,665	1,273	Muhamad Nur Iqbal Abd Razak (GS-PAS)	1,761	Ismail Mohamed (BN-UMNO)	7,845
N8	Bukit Pasir (previously known as Jorak)	Najib Lep (GS-PAS)	9,835	1,883	Noriah Mahat (BN-UMNO)	7,952	Shahruddin Md Salleh (PH-PPBM)	3,726
N9	Gambir	Muhyiddin Mohd Yassin (PH-PPBM)	10,280	3,088	Asojan Muniyandy (BN-MIC)	7,192	Asojan Muniyandy (BN-MIC)	310
N9	Gambir	Muhyiddin Mohd Yassin (PH-PPBM)	10,280	3,088	Mahfodz Mohamed (GS-PAS)	1,806	Asojan Muniyandy (BN-MIC)	310
N10	Tangkak	Ee Chin Li (PH-DAP)	13,512	5,077	Goh Tee Tee (BN-MCA)	8,435	Ee Chin Li (PH-DAP)	1,537
N11	Serom	Faizul Amri Adnan (PH-PAN)	11,774	2,324	Rahim Talib (BN-UMNO)	9,450	Abd Razak Minhat (BN-UMNO)	2,264
N11	Serom	Faizul Amri Adnan (PH-PAN)	11,774	2,324	Mustaffa Salleh (GS-PAS)	2,708	Abd Razak Minhat (BN-UMNO)	2,264
N12	Bentayan	Ng Yak Howe (PH-DAP)	18,278	13,629	Lee Kim Heng (BN-MCA)	4,649	Chua Wee Beng (PH-DAP)	6,847
N13	Simpang Jeram (previously known as Sungai Abong)	Salahuddin Ayub (PH-PAN)	14,640	7,687	Mohd Radzi Md Amin (BN-UMNO)	6,953	Sheikh Ibrahim Salleh (GS-PAS)	3,813
N13	Simpang Jeram (previously known as Sungai Abong)	Salahuddin Ayub (PH-PAN)	14,640	7,687	Mohd Mazri Yahya (GS-PAS)	2,136	Sheikh Ibrahim Salleh (GS-PAS)	3,813
N14	Bukit Naning	Mohd Ysahruddin Kusni (PH-PKR)	7,280	1,552	Hassan Johari (BN-UMNO)	5,728	Saipolbahari Suib (BN-UMNO)	1,455
N14	Bukit Naning	Mohd Ysahruddin Kusni (PH-PKR)	7,280	1,552	Azman Ibrahim (GS-PAS)	1,677	Saipolbahari Suib (BN-UMNO)	1,455
N15	Maharani	Nor Hayati Bachok (PH-PAN)	12,405	5,674	Ashari Md Sharip (BN-UMNO)	6,731	Mohammad Taslim (GS-PAS)	3,136
N15	Maharani	Nor Hayati Bachok (PH-PAN)	12,405	5,674	Mohammad Taslim (GS-PAS)	3,869	Mohammad Taslim (GS-PAS)	3,136
N16	Sungai Balang	Zaiton Ismail (BN-UMNO)	8,022	174	Na’im Jusri (PH-PKR)	7,848	Zaiton Ismail (BN-UMNO)	1,635
N16	Sungai Balang	Zaiton Ismail (BN-UMNO)	8,022	174	Cheman Yusoh (GS-PAS)	3,146	Zaiton Ismail (BN-UMNO)	1,635
N17	Semerah	Mohd Khuzzan Abu Bakar (PH-PKR)	12,619	98	Mohd Ismail Roslan (BN-UMNO)	12,521	Mohd Ismail Roslan (BN-UMNO)	2,649
N17	Semerah	Mohd Khuzzan Abu Bakar (PH-PKR)	12,619	98	Adnan Othman (GS-PAS)	4,314	Mohd Ismail Roslan (BN-UMNO)	2,649
N18	Sri Medan	Zulkurnain Kamisan (BN-UMNO)	11,587	6,040	Mohd Ajib Omar (PH-PPBM)	5,547	Zulkurnain Kamisan (BN-UMNO)	9,430
N18	Sri Medan	Zulkurnain Kamisan (BN-UMNO)	11,587	6,040	Sallehuddin Ab Rashid (GS-PAS)	3,238	Zulkurnain Kamisan (BN-UMNO)	9,430
N19	Yong Peng	Chew Peck Choo (PH-DAP)	12,307	5,089	Ling Tian Soon (BN-MCA)	7,218	Chew Peck Choo (PH-DAP)	2,475
N19	Yong Peng	Chew Peck Choo (PH-DAP)	12,307	5,089	Muhammad Abdullah (GS-PAS)	1,243	Chew Peck Choo (PH-DAP)	2,475
N20	Semarang	Samsolbari Jamali (BN-UMNO)	10,751	5,842	Zais Mohd Akil (PH-PPBM)	4,909	Samsol Bari Jamali (BN-UMNO)	8,075
N20	Semarang	Samsolbari Jamali (BN-UMNO)	10,751	5,842	Mohd Bakri Samian (GS-PAS)	2,423	Samsol Bari Jamali (BN-UMNO)	8,075
N21	Parit Yaani	Aminolhuda Hassan (PH-PAN)	12,309	4,834	Soh Lip Yan (BN-MCA)	7,475	Aminolhuda Hassan (PH-PAN)	1,188
N21	Parit Yaani	Aminolhuda Hassan (PH-PAN)	12,309	4,834	Nasir Abdullah (GS-PAS)	2,943	Aminolhuda Hassan (PH-PAN)	1,188
N22	Parit Raja	Nor Rashidah Ramli (BN-UMNO)	9,549	638	Ferdaus Kayau (PH-PPBM)	8,911	Azizah Zakaria (BN-UMNO)	3,956
N22	Parit Raja	Nor Rashidah Ramli (BN-UMNO)	9,549	638	Abdul Hadi Harun (GS-PAS)	3,106	Azizah Zakaria (BN-UMNO)	3,956
N23	Penggaram	Gan Peck Cheng (PH-DAP)	26,825	17,205	Kang Beng Kuan (BN-MCA)	9,620	Gan Peck Cheng (PH-DAP)	10,051
N23	Penggaram	Gan Peck Cheng (PH-DAP)	26,825	17,205	Misran Samian (GS-PAS)	5,185	Gan Peck Cheng (PH-DAP)	10,051
N24	Senggarang	Khairuddin Abdul Rahim (PH-PAN)	10,568	809	Zaidi Jaffar (BN-UMNO)	9,759	A. Aziz Ismail (BN-UMNO)	1,855
N24	Senggarang	Khairuddin Abdul Rahim (PH-PAN)	10,568	809	Mohd Ramli Md Kari (GS-PAS)	2,699	A. Aziz Ismail (BN-UMNO)	1,855
N25	Rengit	Ayub Jamil (BN-UMNO)	9,642	4,172	Malik Faishal Ahmad (PH-PKR)	5,470	Ayub Jamil (BN-UMNO)	5,492
N25	Rengit	Ayub Jamil (BN-UMNO)	9,642	4,172	Mohd Tumiran Ahmad (GS-PAS)	2,313	Ayub Jamil (BN-UMNO)	5,492
N26	Machap	Abdul Taib Abu Bakar (BN-UMNO)	9,375	404	Ahmad Ahem (PH-PPBM)	8,971	Abd Taib Abu Bakar (BN-UMNO)	3,902
N26	Machap	Abdul Taib Abu Bakar (BN-UMNO)	9,375	404	Azlisham Azhar (GS-PAS)	1,630	Abd Taib Abu Bakar (BN-UMNO)	3,902
N27	Layang-Layang	Onn Hafiz Ghazi (BN-UMNO)	7,449	364	Murugan Muthu Samy (PH-PKR)	7,085	Abd Mutalip Abd Rahim (BN-UMNO)	2,518
N27	Layang-Layang	Onn Hafiz Ghazi (BN-UMNO)	7,449	364	Mohd Jubri Selamat (GS-PAS)	1,339	Abd Mutalip Abd Rahim (BN-UMNO)	2,518
N28	Mengkibol	Chew Chong Sin (PH-DAP)	29,559	19,226	Chin Sim Lai (BN-MCA)	10,333	Tan Hong Pin (PH-DAP)	10,001
N29	Mahkota	Muhamad Said Jonit (PH-PAN)	19,507	1,668	Md Jais Sarday (BN-UMNO)	17,839	Md Jais Sarday (BN-UMNO)	1,108
N29	Mahkota	Muhamad Said Jonit (PH-PAN)	19,507	1,668	Muhammad Hasbullah Md Najib (GS-PAS)	3,092	Md Jais Sarday (BN-UMNO)	1,108
N30	Paloh	Sheikh Umar Bagharib Ali (PH-DAP)	8,958	783	Teoh Yap Kun (BN-MCA)	8,175	Teoh Yap Kun (BN-MCA)	103
N30	Paloh	Sheikh Umar Bagharib Ali (PH-DAP)	8,958	783	Shamugam Munisamy (IND)	61	Teoh Yap Kun (BN-MCA)	103
N31	Kahang	Vidyananthan Ramanadhan (BN-MIC)	10,768	2,967	Noorlihan Ariffin (PH-PPBM)	7,907	Vidyananthan Ramanadhan (BN-MIC)	7,801
N32	Endau	Alwiyah Talib (BN-UMNO)	7,136	3,080	Norul Haszarul Abu Samah (PH-PPBM)	4,056	Abd Latiff Bandi (BN-UMNO)	3,110
N32	Endau	Alwiyah Talib (BN-UMNO)	7,136	3,080	Roslan Nikmat (GS-PAS)	3,689	Abd Latiff Bandi (BN-UMNO)	3,110
N33	Tenggaroh	Raven Kumar Krishnasamy (BN-MIC)	12,309	5,765	Rahamizon Abdul Ghani (PH-PKR)	6,544	Raven Kumar S. Krishnasamy (BN-MIC)	13,014
N33	Tenggaroh	Raven Kumar Krishnasamy (BN-MIC)	12,309	5,765	A. Rahman A. Hamid (GS-PAS)	3,543	Raven Kumar S. Krishnasamy (BN-MIC)	13,014
N34	Panti	Hahasrin Hashim (BN-UMNO)	11,409	3,424	Jawahir Hussein (PH-PPBM)	7,985	Baderi Dasuki (BN-UMNO)	10,270
N34	Panti	Hahasrin Hashim (BN-UMNO)	11,409	3,424	Mohd Nazari Mokhtar (GS-PAS)	2,071	Baderi Dasuki (BN-UMNO)	10,270
N35	Pasir Raja	Rashidah Ismail (BN-UMNO)	8,055	1,847	Abrary Ramly (PH-PAN)	6,208	Adham Baba (BN-UMNO)	6,666
N35	Pasir Raja	Rashidah Ismail (BN-UMNO)	8,055	1,847	Bahrin Alias (GS-PAS)	1,351	Adham Baba (BN-UMNO)	6,666
N36	Sedili	Rasman Ithnain (BN-UMNO)	13,407	9,168	Abd Razak Esa (PH-PKR)	4,239	Rasman Ithnain (BN-UMNO)	18,127
N37	Johor Lama	Rosleli Jahari (BN-UMNO)	12,532	5,807	Nor Ashidah Ibrahim (PH-PKR)	6,725	Asiah Md Ariff (BN-UMNO)	7,022
N37	Johor Lama	Rosleli Jahari (BN-UMNO)	12,532	5,807	Siti Zaharah Othman (GS-PAS)	1,433	Asiah Md Ariff (BN-UMNO)	7,022
N38	Penawar	Sharifah Azizah Syed Zain (BN-UMNO)	12,330	7,134	Ahmad Kamal Nor (PH-PAN)	5,196	Hamimah Mansor (BN-UMNO)	12,818
N39	Tanjung Surat (previously known as Tanjong Surat)	Syed Sis Syed Abdul Rahman (BN-UMNO)	9,614	4,522	Zamil Najwah Arbain (PH-PKR)	5,092	Syed Sis Syed A. Rahman (BN-UMNO)	9,035
N40	Tiram	Gopalakrishnan Subramaniam (PH-PKR)	26,573	8,098	Maulizan Bujang (BN-UMNO)	18,475	Maulizan Bujang (BN-UMNO)	7,443
N40	Tiram	Gopalakrishnan Subramaniam (PH-PKR)	26,573	8,098	Azman Atmin (GS-PAS)	'5,366	Maulizan Bujang (BN-UMNO)	7,443
N41	Puteri Wangsa	Mazlan Bujang (PH-PPBM)	37,545	24,959	Abdul Aziz Tohak (BN-UMNO)	12,586	Abdullah Husin (PAS)	3,469
N41	Puteri Wangsa	Mazlan Bujang (PH-PPBM)	37,545	24,959	Abdullah Husin (GS-PAS)	2,654	Abdullah Husin (PAS)	3,469
N41	Puteri Wangsa	Mazlan Bujang (PH-PPBM)	37,545	24,959	Lim Yak Hong (IND)	544	Abdullah Husin (PAS)	3,469
N41	Puteri Wangsa	Mazlan Bujang (PH-PPBM)	37,545	24,959	Ting Choon Chai (IND)	116	Abdullah Husin (PAS)	3,469
N42	Johor Jaya	Liow Cai Tung (PH-DAP)	32,342	15,565	Tan Cher Puk (BN-MCA)	16,777	Liow Cai Tung (PH-DAP)	1,460
N42	Johor Jaya	Liow Cai Tung (PH-DAP)	32,342	15,565	Kumutha Rahman (GS-PAS)	2,605	Liow Cai Tung (PH-DAP)	1,460
N43	Permas	Che Zakaria Mohd Salleh (PH-PPBM)	28,793	8,746	Mohamed Khaled Nordin (BN-UMNO)	20,047	Mohamed Khaled Nordin (BN-UMNO)	5,752
N43	Permas	Che Zakaria Mohd Salleh (PH-PPBM)	28,793	8,746	Ab Aziz Abdullah (GS-PAS)	4,181	Mohamed Khaled Nordin (BN-UMNO)	5,752
N44	Larkin (previously known as Tanjong Puteri)	Mohammad Izhar Ahmad (PH-PPBM)	25,012	8,590	Yahya Jaafar (BN-UMNO)	16,422	Adam Sumiru (BN-UMNO)	9,097
N44	Larkin (previously known as Tanjong Puteri)	Mohammad Izhar Ahmad (PH-PPBM)	25,012	8,590	Zakiah Tukirin (GS-PAS)	3,233	Adam Sumiru (BN-UMNO)	9,097
N45	Stulang	Andrew Chen Kah Eng (PH-DAP)	24,002	12,470	Ang Boon Heng (BN-MCA)	11,532	Chen Kah Eng (PH-DAP)	3,296
N46	Perling (previously known as Pengkalan Rinting)	Cheo Yee How (PH-DAP)	32,592	19,533	Wong You Fong (BN-MCA)	13,059	Cheo Yee How (PH-DAP)	1,970
N46	Perling (previously known as Pengkalan Rinting)	Cheo Yee How (PH-DAP)	32,592	19,533	Muhamad Nazrin Ihsan (GS-PAS)	5,890	Cheo Yee How (PH-DAP)	1,970
N47	Kempas	Osman Sapian (PH-PPBM)	21,137	9,178	Ramli Bohani (BN-UMNO)	11,959	Tengku Putra Haron Aminurrashid Tengku Hamid Jumat (BN-UMNO)	3,947
N47	Kempas	Osman Sapian (PH-PPBM)	21,137	9,178	Dzulkifli Suleiman (GS-PAS)	2,321	Tengku Putra Haron Aminurrashid Tengku Hamid Jumat (BN-UMNO)	3,947
N48	Skudai	Tan Hong Pin (PH-DAP)	47,359	35,126	G. S. Kanan (BN-MIC)	12,233	Boo Cheng Hau (PH-DAP)	18,050
N49	Kota Iskandar (previously known as Nusa Jaya)	Dzulkefly Ahmad (PH-PAN)	33,455	14,543	Khairi Abd Malek (BN-UMNO)	18,912	Zaini Abu Bakar (BN-UMNO)	2,201
N49	Kota Iskandar (previously known as Nusa Jaya)	Dzulkefly Ahmad (PH-PAN)	33,455	14,543	Sallehuddin Mohd Dahiran (GS-PAS)	4,966	Zaini Abu Bakar (BN-UMNO)	2,201
N50	Bukit Permai	Tosrin Jarvanthi (PH-PPBM)	10,998	2,531	Ali Mazat Salleh (BN-UMNO)	8,467	Ali Mazat Salleh (BN-UMNO)	3,369
N50	Bukit Permai	Tosrin Jarvanthi (PH-PPBM)	10,998	2,531	Ab Aziz Jaafar (GS-PAS)	1,392	Ali Mazat Salleh (BN-UMNO)	3,369
N51	Bukit Batu	Jimmy Puah Wee Tse (PH-PKR)	17,105	10,057	Teo Lee Ho (BN-GERAKAN)	7,048	Jimmy Puah Wee Tse (PH-PKR)	4,015
N51	Bukit Batu	Jimmy Puah Wee Tse (PH-PKR)	17,105	10,057	Juwahir Amin (GS-PAS)	1,888	Jimmy Puah Wee Tse (PH-PKR)	4,015
N52	Senai	Tee Boon Tsong (PH-DAP)	28,274	18,902	Shen Poh Kuan (BN-MCA)	9,372	Wong Shu Qi (PH-DAP)	11,227
N53	Benut	Hasni Mohammad (BN-UMNO)	9,480	4,447	Zulkifli Tasrib (PH-PPBM)	5,033	Hasni Mohammad (BN-UMNO)	6,572
N53	Benut	Hasni Mohammad (BN-UMNO)	9,480	4,447	Mohd Firdaus Jaffar (GS-PAS)	2,590	Hasni Mohammad (BN-UMNO)	6,572
N54	Pulai Sebatang	Muhammad Taqiuddin Cheman (PH-PAN)	14,507	3,395	Tee Siew Kiong (BN-MCA)	11,112	Tee Siew Kiong (BN-MCA)	3,412
N54	Pulai Sebatang	Muhammad Taqiuddin Cheman (PH-PAN)	14,507	3,395	Baharom Mohamad (GS-PAS)	2,975	Tee Siew Kiong (BN-MCA)	3,412
N55	Pekan Nanas (previously known as Pekan Nenas)	Yeo Tung Siong (PH-DAP)	11,856	1,308	Tan Eng Meng (BN-MCA)	10,548	Yeo Tung Siong (PH-DAP)	2,669
N56	Kukup	Mohd Othman Yusof (BN-UMNO)	11,113	862	Suhaizan Kayat (PH-PAN)	10,251	Suhaimi Salleh (BN-UMNO)	6,946
N56	Kukup	Mohd Othman Yusof (BN-UMNO)	11,113	862	Abdul Karim Deraman (GS-PAS)	1,040	Suhaimi Salleh (BN-UMNO)	6,946

== Sabah ==
#	Constituency	Winner	Votes	Majority	Opponent(s)	Votes	Incumbent	Incumbent Majority
BN 29 | GS 0 | PH 8 | WARISAN 21 | STAR 2 | Independent 0
N1	Banggi	Mohammad Mohamarin (WARISAN)	3,613	379	Abdul Mijul Unaini (BN-UMNO)	3,234	Abdul Mijul Unaini (BN-UMNO)	3,239
N1	Banggi	Mohammad Mohamarin (WARISAN)	3,613	379	Norlaji Amir Hassan (USA-STAR)	367	Abdul Mijul Unaini (BN-UMNO)	3,239
N1	Banggi	Mohammad Mohamarin (WARISAN)	3,613	379	Abidula Amsana (USA-PHRS)	198	Abdul Mijul Unaini (BN-UMNO)	3,239
N1	Banggi	Mohammad Mohamarin (WARISAN)	3,613	379	Kusugan Ali (USA-PPRS)	105	Abdul Mijul Unaini (BN-UMNO)	3,239
N1	Banggi	Mohammad Mohamarin (WARISAN)	3,613	379	Abdul Nasir Jamaluddin (PKS)	43	Abdul Mijul Unaini (BN-UMNO)	3,239
N2	Tanjong Kapor	Ben Chong Chen Bin (WARISAN)	9,124	2,992	Teo Chee Kang (BN-LDP)	6,132	Teo Chee Kang (BN-LDP)	1,985
N2	Tanjong Kapor	Ben Chong Chen Bin (WARISAN)	9,124	2,992	Aliasgar Omolong (GS-PAS)	617	Teo Chee Kang (BN-LDP)	1,985
N2	Tanjong Kapor	Ben Chong Chen Bin (WARISAN)	9,124	2,992	Thomas Tsen Chau Yin (PCS)	481	Teo Chee Kang (BN-LDP)	1,985
N2	Tanjong Kapor	Ben Chong Chen Bin (WARISAN)	9,124	2,992	Allaidly Poyon (USA-PPRS)	446	Teo Chee Kang (BN-LDP)	1,985
N3	Pitas	Bolkiah Ismail (BN-UMNO)	5,606	1,282	Maklin Masiau (WARISAN)	4,324	Bolkiah Ismail (BN-UMNO)	3,823
N3	Pitas	Bolkiah Ismail (BN-UMNO)	5,606	1,282	Bakir Mancaing (USA-PHRS)	1,527	Bolkiah Ismail (BN-UMNO)	3,823
N3	Pitas	Bolkiah Ismail (BN-UMNO)	5,606	1,282	Ramlah Nasir (PKS)	508	Bolkiah Ismail (BN-UMNO)	3,823
N3	Pitas	Bolkiah Ismail (BN-UMNO)	5,606	1,282	Pransol Tiying (ANAK NEGERI)	400	Bolkiah Ismail (BN-UMNO)	3,823
N3	Pitas	Bolkiah Ismail (BN-UMNO)	5,606	1,282	Dausieh Queck (GS-PAS)	262	Bolkiah Ismail (BN-UMNO)	3,823
N4	Matunggong	Julita Mojungki (BN-PBS)	6,946	1,687	Sazalye Donol Abdullah (PH-PKR)	5,259	Jelani Dasanap (IND)	320
N4	Matunggong	Julita Mojungki (BN-PBS)	6,946	1,687	Marunsai Dawai (USA-STAR)	2,968	Jelani Dasanap (IND)	320
N4	Matunggong	Julita Mojungki (BN-PBS)	6,946	1,687	Jornah Mozihim (PCS)	1,348	Jelani Dasanap (IND)	320
N4	Matunggong	Julita Mojungki (BN-PBS)	6,946	1,687	Rahim Madhakong (PKS)	98	Jelani Dasanap (IND)	320
N5	Tandek	Anita Baranting (BN-PBS)	8,877	4,592	Baintin Adun (WARISAN)	4,285	Lasiah Baranting (BN-PBS)	5,275
N5	Tandek	Anita Baranting (BN-PBS)	8,877	4,592	Joel Masilung (USA-STAR)	3,621	Lasiah Baranting (BN-PBS)	5,275
N5	Tandek	Anita Baranting (BN-PBS)	8,877	4,592	Johnson Gaban (PCS)	553	Lasiah Baranting (BN-PBS)	5,275
N6	Tempasuk	Musbah Jamli (BN-UMNO)	7,742	1,994	Mustapha Sakmud (PH-PKR)	5,748	Musbah Jamli (BN-UMNO)	5,210
N6	Tempasuk	Musbah Jamli (BN-UMNO)	7,742	1,994	Suwah Buleh (USA-STAR)	1,494	Musbah Jamli (BN-UMNO)	5,210
N6	Tempasuk	Musbah Jamli (BN-UMNO)	7,742	1,994	Mustaqim Aling (GS-PAS)	521	Musbah Jamli (BN-UMNO)	5,210
N7	Kadamaian	Ewon Benedick (BN-UPKO)	6,861	3,294	Lukia Indan (PH-PKR)	3,567	Jeremmy Ukoh Malajad (IND)	889
N7	Kadamaian	Ewon Benedick (BN-UPKO)	6,861	3,294	Rubbin Guribah (USA-STAR)	3,034	Jeremmy Ukoh Malajad (IND)	889
N7	Kadamaian	Ewon Benedick (BN-UPKO)	6,861	3,294	Mail Balinu (PCS)	764	Jeremmy Ukoh Malajad (IND)	889
N7	Kadamaian	Ewon Benedick (BN-UPKO)	6,861	3,294	Satail Majungkat (GS-PAS)	129	Jeremmy Ukoh Malajad (IND)	889
N8	Usukan	Japlin Akim (BN-UMNO)	8,738	1,225	Abdul Bakhrin Mohd Yusof (WARISAN)	7,513	Md Salleh Md Said (BN-UMNO)	6,812
N8	Usukan	Japlin Akim (BN-UMNO)	8,738	1,225	Adzmin Awang (GS-PAS)	355	Md Salleh Md Said (BN-UMNO)	6,812
N8	Usukan	Japlin Akim (BN-UMNO)	8,738	1,225	Amsor Tuah (IND)	70	Md Salleh Md Said (BN-UMNO)	6,812
N9	Tamparuli	Jahid Jahim (BN-PBS)	6,818	2,080	Dausil Kundayong (PH-PKR)	4,738	Wilfred Bumburing (PCS)	383
N9	Tamparuli	Jahid Jahim (BN-PBS)	6,818	2,080	Wilfred Bumburing (PCS)	2,541	Wilfred Bumburing (PCS)	383
N9	Tamparuli	Jahid Jahim (BN-PBS)	6,818	2,080	Samin Dulin (USA-STAR)	901	Wilfred Bumburing (PCS)	383
N10	Sulaman	Hajiji Noor (BN-UMNO)	12,966	7,774	Abdullah Sani Daud (WARISAN)	5,192	Hajiji Mohd Noor (BN-UMNO)	10,441
N10	Sulaman	Hajiji Noor (BN-UMNO)	12,966	7,774	Arifin Harith (USA-PHRS)	467	Hajiji Mohd Noor (BN-UMNO)	10,441
N11	Kiulu	Joniston Bangkuai (BN-PBS)	4,336	1,443	Jo-Anna Sue Henley Rampas (WARISAN)	2,893	Joniston Bangkuai (BN-PBS)	44
N11	Kiulu	Joniston Bangkuai (BN-PBS)	4,336	1,443	Terence Sinti (USA-STAR)	2,457	Joniston Bangkuai (BN-PBS)	44
N11	Kiulu	Joniston Bangkuai (BN-PBS)	4,336	1,443	Gaibin Ransoi (PCS)	543	Joniston Bangkuai (BN-PBS)	44
N12	Karambunai	Azhar Matussin (WARISAN)	14,157	5,366	Jainab Ahmad Ayid (BN-UMNO)	8,791	Jainab Ahmad Ayid (BN-UMNO)	9,276
N12	Karambunai	Azhar Matussin (WARISAN)	14,157	5,366	Aspar Oyet (GS-PAS)	1,696	Jainab Ahmad Ayid (BN-UMNO)	9,276
N12	Karambunai	Azhar Matussin (WARISAN)	14,157	5,366	Ahsim Jamat (USA-SAPP)	1,258	Jainab Ahmad Ayid (BN-UMNO)	9,276
N13	Inanam	Kenny Chua Teck Ho (PH-PKR)	13,633	7,783	Johnny Goh Chin Lok (BN-PBS)	5,850	Roland Chia Ming Shen (PH-PKR)	3,202
N13	Inanam	Kenny Chua Teck Ho (PH-PKR)	13,633	7,783	Johnny Stephen Dionysius (USA-SAPP)	1,695	Roland Chia Ming Shen (PH-PKR)	3,202
N13	Inanam	Kenny Chua Teck Ho (PH-PKR)	13,633	7,783	Terence Tsen Kim Fatt (ANAK NEGERI)	480	Roland Chia Ming Shen (PH-PKR)	3,202
N13	Inanam	Kenny Chua Teck Ho (PH-PKR)	13,633	7,783	Jakariah Janit (PKS)	156	Roland Chia Ming Shen (PH-PKR)	3,202
N13	Inanam	Kenny Chua Teck Ho (PH-PKR)	13,633	7,783	Situl Mintow (IND)	57	Roland Chia Ming Shen (PH-PKR)	3,202
N14	Likas	Tan Lee Fatt (PH-DAP)	9,163	7,902	Chin Shu Ying (BN-LDP)	1,261	Junz Wong Hong Jun (WARISAN)	5,652
N14	Likas	Tan Lee Fatt (PH-DAP)	9,163	7,902	Yong We Kong (USA-SAPP)	673	Junz Wong Hong Jun (WARISAN)	5,652
N15	Api-Api	Christina Liew Chin Jin (PH-PKR)	8,174	2,954	Yee Moh Chai (BN-PBS)	5,220	Christina Liew Chin Jin (PH-PKR)	795
N15	Api-Api	Christina Liew Chin Jin (PH-PKR)	8,174	2,954	Lim Kat Chung (USA-SAPP)	598	Christina Liew Chin Jin (PH-PKR)	795
N15	Api-Api	Christina Liew Chin Jin (PH-PKR)	8,174	2,954	Len Lip Fong (ANAK NEGERI)	244	Christina Liew Chin Jin (PH-PKR)	795
N15	Api-Api	Christina Liew Chin Jin (PH-PKR)	8,174	2,954	Chan Chee Ching (IND)	94	Christina Liew Chin Jin (PH-PKR)	795
N16	Luyang	Phoong Jin Zhe (PH-DAP)	14,237	12,408	Pamela Yong (BN-MCA)	1,829	Hiew King Cheu (BN-MCA)	8,676
N16	Luyang	Phoong Jin Zhe (PH-DAP)	14,237	12,408	Gee Tien Siong (USA-SAPP)	807	Hiew King Cheu (BN-MCA)	8,676
N17	Tanjong Aru	Wong Hong Jun (WARISAN)	9,794	4,610	Yong Oui Fah (BN-PBS)	5,184	Yong Oui Fah (BN-PBS)	3,690
N17	Tanjong Aru	Wong Hong Jun (WARISAN)	9,794	4,610	Hamid Ismail (GS-PAS)	1,379	Yong Oui Fah (BN-PBS)	3,690
N17	Tanjong Aru	Wong Hong Jun (WARISAN)	9,794	4,610	Noraiza Mohammad Noor (USA-PHRS)	566	Yong Oui Fah (BN-PBS)	3,690
N17	Tanjong Aru	Wong Hong Jun (WARISAN)	9,794	4,610	Chong Wei Leung (ANAK NEGERI)	494	Yong Oui Fah (BN-PBS)	3,690
N18	Petagas	Uda Sulai (WARISAN)	6,526	208	Yahya Hussin (BN-UMNO)	6,318	Yahya Hussin (BN-UMNO)	5,653
N18	Petagas	Uda Sulai (WARISAN)	6,526	208	Ester Otion (USA-PHRS)	760	Yahya Hussin (BN-UMNO)	5,653
N19	Kapayan	Jannie Lasimbang (PH-DAP)	19,558	13,250	Francis Goh Fah Sun (BN-MCA)	6,308	Edwin Bosi (IND)	7,287
N19	Kapayan	Jannie Lasimbang (PH-DAP)	19,558	13,250	Chong Pit Fah (USA-STAR)	1,318	Edwin Bosi (IND)	7,287
N20	Moyog	Jennifer Lasimbang (WARISAN)	9,745	4,442	Donald Peter Mojuntin (BN-UPKO)	5,303	Terrence Siambun (WARISAN)	1,682
N20	Moyog	Jennifer Lasimbang (WARISAN)	9,745	4,442	Danim Siap (USA-STAR)	605	Terrence Siambun (WARISAN)	1,682
N20	Moyog	Jennifer Lasimbang (WARISAN)	9,745	4,442	Bandasan Tunding (PCS)	222	Terrence Siambun (WARISAN)	1,682
N21	Kawang	Ghulam Haidar Khan Bahadar (BN-UMNO)	10,388	2,862	Salleh Eddris (WARISAN)	7,526	Yusof @ Ghulam Haidar Khan Bahadar (BN-UMNO)	8,900
N21	Kawang	Ghulam Haidar Khan Bahadar (BN-UMNO)	10,388	2,862	Matlin Jilon (USA-PHRS)	781	Yusof @ Ghulam Haidar Khan Bahadar (BN-UMNO)	8,900
N21	Kawang	Ghulam Haidar Khan Bahadar (BN-UMNO)	10,388	2,862	Wahid Ismail (ANAK NEGERI)	201	Yusof @ Ghulam Haidar Khan Bahadar (BN-UMNO)	8,900
N22	Pantai Manis	Aidi Moktar (WARISAN)	9,234	2,108	Abdul Rahim Ismail (BN-UMNO)	7,126	Abdul Rahim Ismail (BN-UMNO)	4,409
N22	Pantai Manis	Aidi Moktar (WARISAN)	9,234	2,108	James Ghani (USA-PHRS)	448	Abdul Rahim Ismail (BN-UMNO)	4,409
N22	Pantai Manis	Aidi Moktar (WARISAN)	9,234	2,108	Herman Jawasing Mianus (PCS)	129	Abdul Rahim Ismail (BN-UMNO)	4,409
N23	Bongawan	Daud Yusof (WARISAN)	6,912	795	Mohamad Alamin (BN-UMNO)	6,117	Mohamad Alamin (BN-UMNO)	3,392
N23	Bongawan	Daud Yusof (WARISAN)	6,912	795	Jaafar Ismail (USA-PHRS)	627	Mohamad Alamin (BN-UMNO)	3,392
N24	Membakut	Mohd. Arifin Mohd. Arif (BN-UMNO)	6,495	2,403	Abdul Sani Marip (WARISAN)	4,092	Mohd Arifin Mohd Arif (BN-UMNO)	3,510
N24	Membakut	Mohd. Arifin Mohd. Arif (BN-UMNO)	6,495	2,403	Ali Omar Mohd Idris (USA-PHRS)	456	Mohd Arifin Mohd Arif (BN-UMNO)	3,510
N24	Membakut	Mohd. Arifin Mohd. Arif (BN-UMNO)	6,495	2,403	Rosjelen Salimat (PCS)	223	Mohd Arifin Mohd Arif (BN-UMNO)	3,510
N24	Membakut	Mohd. Arifin Mohd. Arif (BN-UMNO)	6,495	2,403	Yahya Ahmad (IND)	85	Mohd Arifin Mohd Arif (BN-UMNO)	3,510
N25	Klias	Isnin Aliasnih (BN-UMNO)	6,173	2,336	Lajim Ukin (USA-PHRS)	3,837	Lajim Ukin (USA-PHRS)	179
N25	Klias	Isnin Aliasnih (BN-UMNO)	6,173	2,336	Johair Mat Lani (WARISAN)	3,725	Lajim Ukin (USA-PHRS)	179
N26	Kuala Penyu	Limus Jury (BN-UPKO)	7,352	3,545	Dikin Musah (PH-PKR)	3,807	Limus Jury (BN-UPKO)	2,273
N26	Kuala Penyu	Limus Jury (BN-UPKO)	7,352	3,545	Jonas Sunggim (USA-PHRS)	1,749	Limus Jury (BN-UPKO)	2,273
N26	Kuala Penyu	Limus Jury (BN-UPKO)	7,352	3,545	Herman Tiongsoh (PCS)	548	Limus Jury (BN-UPKO)	2,273
N27	Lumadan	Matbali Musah (BN-UMNO)	6,836	2,935	Md Samlih Juaisin (WARISAN)	3,901	Kamarlin Ombi (BN-UMNO)	3,862
N27	Lumadan	Matbali Musah (BN-UMNO)	6,836	2,935	Asmat Japar (USA-PHRS)	1,331	Kamarlin Ombi (BN-UMNO)	3,862
N28	Sindumin	Yusof Yacob (WARISAN)	6,648	760	Sapawi Ahmad (BN-UMNO)	5,888	Ahmad Bujang (BN-UMNO)	4,323
N28	Sindumin	Yusof Yacob (WARISAN)	6,648	760	Patrick Sadom (USA-PHRS)	273	Ahmad Bujang (BN-UMNO)	4,323
N29	Kundasang	Joachim Gunsalam (BN-PBS)	3,971	255	Siriman M. F. Basir (WARISAN)	3,716	Joachim Gunsalam (BN-PBS)	1,975
N29	Kundasang	Joachim Gunsalam (BN-PBS)	3,971	255	Japril Suhaimin (USA-STAR)	2,105	Joachim Gunsalam (BN-PBS)	1,975
N29	Kundasang	Joachim Gunsalam (BN-PBS)	3,971	255	Henrynus Amin (ANAK NEGERI)	733	Joachim Gunsalam (BN-PBS)	1,975
N29	Kundasang	Joachim Gunsalam (BN-PBS)	3,971	255	Jinus Sodiong (PKS)	166	Joachim Gunsalam (BN-PBS)	1,975
N30	Karanaan	Masidi Manjun (BN-UMNO)	6,849	3,782	Chong Peck Hing (PH-PKR)	3,067	Masidi Manjun (BN-UMNO)	3,500
N30	Karanaan	Masidi Manjun (BN-UMNO)	6,849	3,782	Adzman Manaf (USA-PHRS)	685	Masidi Manjun (BN-UMNO)	3,500
N30	Karanaan	Masidi Manjun (BN-UMNO)	6,849	3,782	Juhaili Sidek (ANAK NEGERI)	104	Masidi Manjun (BN-UMNO)	3,500
N31	Paginatan	Abidin Madingkir (BN-UPKO)	5,666	2,066	Julian Sidin (WARISAN)	3,600	Vacant	979
N31	Paginatan	Abidin Madingkir (BN-UPKO)	5,666	2,066	Feddrin Tuling (USA-STAR)	1,870	Vacant	979
N31	Paginatan	Abidin Madingkir (BN-UPKO)	5,666	2,066	Satiol Indong (PCS)	362	Vacant	979
N31	Paginatan	Abidin Madingkir (BN-UPKO)	5,666	2,066	Mat Jaili Samat (USA-PPRS)	104	Vacant	979
N32	Tambunan	Jeffrey G. Kitingan (USA-STAR)	6,136	1,037	Joseph Pairin Kitingan (BN-PBS)	5,099	Joseph Pairin Kitingan (BN-PBS)	2,079
N32	Tambunan	Jeffrey G. Kitingan (USA-STAR)	6,136	1,037	Justin Alip (WARISAN)	1,427	Joseph Pairin Kitingan (BN-PBS)	2,079
N32	Tambunan	Jeffrey G. Kitingan (USA-STAR)	6,136	1,037	Nestor Joannes (PCS)	456	Joseph Pairin Kitingan (BN-PBS)	2,079
N33	Bingkor	Robert Tawik (USA-STAR)	4,552	165	Peter Aliun (BN-PBS)	4,387	Jeffrey G. Kitingan (USA-STAR)	456
N33	Bingkor	Robert Tawik (USA-STAR)	4,552	165	Peter Dhom Saili (PH-DAP)	4,233	Jeffrey G. Kitingan (USA-STAR)	456
N33	Bingkor	Robert Tawik (USA-STAR)	4,552	165	Aisat Igau (ANAK NEGERI)	290	Jeffrey G. Kitingan (USA-STAR)	456
N33	Bingkor	Robert Tawik (USA-STAR)	4,552	165	Justin Guka (IND)	182	Jeffrey G. Kitingan (USA-STAR)	456
N33	Bingkor	Robert Tawik (USA-STAR)	4,552	165	Uling Anggan (PKS)	69	Jeffrey G. Kitingan (USA-STAR)	456
N34	Liawan	Rasinin Kautis (WARISAN)	6,387	1,382	Sapin Karano (BN-UMNO)	5,005	Sapin Karano (BN-UMNO)	1,752
N34	Liawan	Rasinin Kautis (WARISAN)	6,387	1,382	Kong Fui Seng (USA-STAR)	1,809	Sapin Karano (BN-UMNO)	1,752
N34	Liawan	Rasinin Kautis (WARISAN)	6,387	1,382	Hussein Kassim (PCS)	176	Sapin Karano (BN-UMNO)	1,752
N35	Melalap	Peter Anthony (WARISAN)	5,010	293	Radin Malleh (BN-PBS)	4,717	Radin Malleh (BN-PBS)	2,599
N35	Melalap	Peter Anthony (WARISAN)	5,010	293	Jaineh Juata (USA-STAR)	861	Radin Malleh (BN-PBS)	2,599
N35	Melalap	Peter Anthony (WARISAN)	5,010	293	Chinly Moniu (PCS)	69	Radin Malleh (BN-PBS)	2,599
N35	Melalap	Peter Anthony (WARISAN)	5,010	293	Lidos Rabih (PKS)	45	Radin Malleh (BN-PBS)	2,599
N36	Kemabong	Jamawi Ja’afar (BN-UMNO)	6,093	895	Haris Bolos (WARISAN)	5,198	Rubin Balang (BN-UMNO)	3,032
N36	Kemabong	Jamawi Ja’afar (BN-UMNO)	6,093	895	Alfred Tay Jin Kiong (PCS)	152	Rubin Balang (BN-UMNO)	3,032
N36	Kemabong	Jamawi Ja’afar (BN-UMNO)	6,093	895	Yahya Raimah (USA-PHRS)	124	Rubin Balang (BN-UMNO)	3,032
N37	Sook	Ellron Alfred Angin (BN-PBRS)	8,042	4,485	Martin Tommy (WARISAN)	3,557	Ellron Angin (BN-PBRS)	4,395
N37	Sook	Ellron Alfred Angin (BN-PBRS)	8,042	4,485	Baritus Gungkit (USA-STAR)	3,402	Ellron Angin (BN-PBRS)	4,395
N37	Sook	Ellron Alfred Angin (BN-PBRS)	8,042	4,485	Peter Beaty (ANAK NEGERI)	113	Ellron Angin (BN-PBRS)	4,395
N38	Nabawan	Bobbey Ah Fang Suan (BN-UPKO)	5,474	2,072	Ahuar Rasam (WARISAN)	3,402	Bobbey Ah Fang Suan (BN-UPKO)	342
N38	Nabawan	Bobbey Ah Fang Suan (BN-UPKO)	5,474	2,072	Apandi Angindi (USA-PHRS)	165	Bobbey Ah Fang Suan (BN-UPKO)	342
N38	Nabawan	Bobbey Ah Fang Suan (BN-UPKO)	5,474	2,072	Nasruddin Lambahan (PCS)	156	Bobbey Ah Fang Suan (BN-UPKO)	342
N39	Sugut	James Ratib (BN-UMNO)	4,704	1,521	Aspah Abdullah Sani (WARISAN)	3,183	James Ratib (BN-UMNO)	2,820
N39	Sugut	James Ratib (BN-UMNO)	4,704	1,521	Mohd Arshad Abdul Mualap (USA-PPRS)	436	James Ratib (BN-UMNO)	2,820
N39	Sugut	James Ratib (BN-UMNO)	4,704	1,521	Ag. Osman Asibih (PKS)	111	James Ratib (BN-UMNO)	2,820
N40	Labuk	Abd Rahman Kongkawang (BN-PBS)	6,665	2,600	Ramsah Tasim (WARISAN)	4,065	Micheal Asang (BN-PBS)	4,526
N40	Labuk	Abd Rahman Kongkawang (BN-PBS)	6,665	2,600	Rainus Awang (USA-STAR)	1,171	Micheal Asang (BN-PBS)	4,526
N40	Labuk	Abd Rahman Kongkawang (BN-PBS)	6,665	2,600	James Miki (PCS)	383	Micheal Asang (BN-PBS)	4,526
N40	Labuk	Abd Rahman Kongkawang (BN-PBS)	6,665	2,600	Albert Thomas Enti (PKS)	141	Micheal Asang (BN-PBS)	4,526
N41	Gum-Gum	Arunarsin Taib (WARISAN)	4,710	598	Juslie Ajirol (BN-UMNO)	4,112	Zakaria Mohd Edris @ Tubau (BN-UMNO)	2,357
N41	Gum-Gum	Arunarsin Taib (WARISAN)	4,710	598	Dahil Masdik (USA-PHRS)	252	Zakaria Mohd Edris @ Tubau (BN-UMNO)	2,357
N41	Gum-Gum	Arunarsin Taib (WARISAN)	4,710	598	Christine Bugung (PKS)	81	Zakaria Mohd Edris @ Tubau (BN-UMNO)	2,357
N41	Gum-Gum	Arunarsin Taib (WARISAN)	4,710	598	Jamaludin Lamba (USA-PPRS)	63	Zakaria Mohd Edris @ Tubau (BN-UMNO)	2,357
N42	Sungai Sibuga	Musa Aman (BN-UMNO)	14,503	2,184	Asmara Abdul Rahman (WARISAN)	12,319	Musa Aman (BN-UMNO)	11,569
N42	Sungai Sibuga	Musa Aman (BN-UMNO)	14,503	2,184	Osman Enting (PKS)	241	Musa Aman (BN-UMNO)	11,569
N43	Sekong	Arifin Asgali (WARISAN)	6,740	2,035	Samsudin Yahya (BN-UMNO)	4,705	Samsudin Yahya (BN-UMNO)	3,530
N43	Sekong	Arifin Asgali (WARISAN)	6,740	2,035	Sahar Abdul Majid (GS-PAS)	366	Samsudin Yahya (BN-UMNO)	3,530
N43	Sekong	Arifin Asgali (WARISAN)	6,740	2,035	Abdul Rashid Abdul Rahman (STAR)	48	Samsudin Yahya (BN-UMNO)	3,530
N43	Sekong	Arifin Asgali (WARISAN)	6,740	2,035	Datu Mohd Faisal Datu Bachtiyal (IND)	43	Samsudin Yahya (BN-UMNO)	3,530
N43	Sekong	Arifin Asgali (WARISAN)	6,740	2,035	Alias Rahmad Benjamin (PKS)	16	Samsudin Yahya (BN-UMNO)	3,530
N44	Karamunting	George Hiew Vun Zin (WARISAN)	7,243	3,848	Lim Kai Min (BN-LDP)	3,395	Charles O Pang Su Pin (BN-LDP)	855
N44	Karamunting	George Hiew Vun Zin (WARISAN)	7,243	3,848	Norsah Bongsu (GS-PAS)	677	Charles O Pang Su Pin (BN-LDP)	855
N44	Karamunting	George Hiew Vun Zin (WARISAN)	7,243	3,848	Besarun Kecha (STAR)	61	Charles O Pang Su Pin (BN-LDP)	855
N45	Elopura	Calvin Chong Ket Kiun (PH-DAP)	12,219	6,647	Chan Tzun Hei (BN-GERAKAN)	5,572	Au Kam Yah (BN-GERAKAN)	251
N46	Tanjong Papat	Frankie Poon Ming Fung (PH-DAP)	5,818	1,816	Raymond Tan Shu Kiah (BN-GERAKAN)	4,002	Raymond Tan Shu Kiah (BN-GERAKAN)	1,522
N46	Tanjong Papat	Frankie Poon Ming Fung (PH-DAP)	5,818	1,816	Jufazli Shi Ahmad (IND)	533	Raymond Tan Shu Kiah (BN-GERAKAN)	1,522
N47	Kuamut	Masiung Banah (BN-UPKO)	8,042	4,121	Norfaizah Chua (WARISAN)	3,921	Masiung Banah (BN-UPKO)	4,618
N47	Kuamut	Masiung Banah (BN-UPKO)	8,042	4,121	James Ait (USA-STAR)	1,132	Masiung Banah (BN-UPKO)	4,618
N47	Kuamut	Masiung Banah (BN-UPKO)	8,042	4,121	Jumaidin Lakalla (GS-PAS)	330	Masiung Banah (BN-UPKO)	4,618
N47	Kuamut	Masiung Banah (BN-UPKO)	8,042	4,121	Edward Podok (PCS)	205	Masiung Banah (BN-UPKO)	4,618
N48	Sukau	Saddi Abdu Rahman (BN-UMNO)	4,660	1,628	Ismail Mohd Ayub (WARISAN)	3,032	Saddi Abdu Rahman (BN-UMNO)	4,419
N48	Sukau	Saddi Abdu Rahman (BN-UMNO)	4,660	1,628	Muarrifidin Abdul Malek (USA-PHRS)	117	Saddi Abdu Rahman (BN-UMNO)	4,419
N48	Sukau	Saddi Abdu Rahman (BN-UMNO)	4,660	1,628	Abdulgani Kosui (USA-PPRS)	71	Saddi Abdu Rahman (BN-UMNO)	4,419
N49	Tungku	Assaffal P. Alian (WARISAN)	6,295	1,001	Mizma Appehdullah (BN-UMNO)	5,294	Vacant	5,484
N49	Tungku	Assaffal P. Alian (WARISAN)	6,295	1,001	Bulangan Palasi (USA-PHRS)	928	Vacant	5,484
N49	Tungku	Assaffal P. Alian (WARISAN)	6,295	1,001	Abd Rahman Tanggoh (PKS)	102	Vacant	5,484
N50	Lahad Datu	Dumi Pg. Masdal (WARISAN)	11,304	2,932	Mohammad Yusoff Apdal (BN-UMNO)	8,372	Mohammad Yusoff Apdal (BN-UMNO)	8,415
N50	Lahad Datu	Dumi Pg. Masdal (WARISAN)	11,304	2,932	Wong Yu Chin (USA-PHRS)	663	Mohammad Yusoff Apdal (BN-UMNO)	8,415
N51	Kunak	Norazlinah Arif (WARISAN)	4,898	268	Nilwan Kabang (BN-UMNO)	4,630	Nilwan Kabang (BN-UMNO)	5,360
N51	Kunak	Norazlinah Arif (WARISAN)	4,898	268	Kasman Karate (GS-PAS)	492	Nilwan Kabang (BN-UMNO)	5,360
N51	Kunak	Norazlinah Arif (WARISAN)	4,898	268	Sahing Taking (USA-PHRS)	141	Nilwan Kabang (BN-UMNO)	5,360
N52	Sulabayan	Jaujan Sambakong (WARISAN)	7,116	4,926	Harman Mohamad (BN-UMNO)	2,190	Jaujan Sambakong (WARISAN)	5,192
N52	Sulabayan	Jaujan Sambakong (WARISAN)	7,116	4,926	Abdul Nasir Ab Raup (GS-PAS)	139	Jaujan Sambakong (WARISAN)	5,192
N52	Sulabayan	Jaujan Sambakong (WARISAN)	7,116	4,926	Untung Tanjong Baru (USA-PHRS)	54	Jaujan Sambakong (WARISAN)	5,192
N53	Senallang	Mohd Shafie Apdal (WARISAN)	7,754	5,301	Nasir Sakaran (BN-UMNO)	2,453	Nasir Sakaran (BN-UMNO)	5,909
N54	Bugaya	Manis Buka Mohd Darah (WARISAN)	10,662	7,851	Abdul Razak Sakaran (BN-UMNO)	2,811	Ramleee Marhaban (BN-UMNO)	3,503
N54	Bugaya	Manis Buka Mohd Darah (WARISAN)	10,662	7,851	Mahamod Sarahil (GS-PAS)	144	Ramleee Marhaban (BN-UMNO)	3,503
N54	Bugaya	Manis Buka Mohd Darah (WARISAN)	10,662	7,851	Kulli Maralam (PKS)	67	Ramleee Marhaban (BN-UMNO)	3,503
N54	Bugaya	Manis Buka Mohd Darah (WARISAN)	10,662	7,851	Mohammad Said Tiblan (USA-PPRS)	57	Ramleee Marhaban (BN-UMNO)	3,503
N54	Bugaya	Manis Buka Mohd Darah (WARISAN)	10,662	7,851	Abd Muksin Mohammad Hassan (IND)	15	Ramleee Marhaban (BN-UMNO)	3,503
N55	Balung	Osman Jamal (BN-UMNO)	4,887	174	Andi Rus Diana Andi Paladjareng (WARISAN)	4,713	S. Abas S. Ali (BN-UMNO)	5,569
N55	Balung	Osman Jamal (BN-UMNO)	4,887	174	Amboase Ramano (GS-PAS)	428	S. Abas S. Ali (BN-UMNO)	5,569
N55	Balung	Osman Jamal (BN-UMNO)	4,887	174	Razali Hamzah (USA-PHRS)	233	S. Abas S. Ali (BN-UMNO)	5,569
N55	Balung	Osman Jamal (BN-UMNO)	4,887	174	Alipa Jackery (USNO Baru)	119	S. Abas S. Ali (BN-UMNO)	5,569
N56	Apas	Nizam Abu Bakar Titingan (BN-UMNO)	7,243	1,787	Abdul Salip Ejal (WARISAN)	5,456	Vacant	6,122
N56	Apas	Nizam Abu Bakar Titingan (BN-UMNO)	7,243	1,787	Daud Jalaluddin (GS-PAS)	487	Vacant	6,122
N56	Apas	Nizam Abu Bakar Titingan (BN-UMNO)	7,243	1,787	Alizaman Jijurahman (USA-PHRS)	333	Vacant	6,122
N57	Sri Tanjong	Jimmy Wong Sze Phin (PH-DAP)	13,673	9,383	Lo Su Fui (BN-PBS)	4,290	Chan Foong Hin (PH-DAP)	5,927
N57	Sri Tanjong	Jimmy Wong Sze Phin (PH-DAP)	13,673	9,383	Pang Thou Chung (USA-PHRS)	873	Chan Foong Hin (PH-DAP)	5,927
N57	Sri Tanjong	Jimmy Wong Sze Phin (PH-DAP)	13,673	9,383	Leong Yun Fui (PKS)	154	Chan Foong Hin (PH-DAP)	5,927
N58	Merotai	Sarifuddin Hata (WARISAN)	7,707	2,150	Lim Ting Kai (BN-LDP)	5,557	Pang Yuk Ming (BN-LDP)	4,088
N58	Merotai	Sarifuddin Hata (WARISAN)	7,707	2,150	Ahmad Dullah (GS-PAS)	1,209	Pang Yuk Ming (BN-LDP)	4,088
N58	Merotai	Sarifuddin Hata (WARISAN)	7,707	2,150	Arbaani Akum (PH-PAN)	193	Pang Yuk Ming (BN-LDP)	4,088
N58	Merotai	Sarifuddin Hata (WARISAN)	7,707	2,150	Sharata Masyaroh John Ridwan Lincoln (USA-PHRS)	125	Pang Yuk Ming (BN-LDP)	4,088
N58	Merotai	Sarifuddin Hata (WARISAN)	7,707	2,150	Mohd Nasir Sumadi (USNO Baru)	28	Pang Yuk Ming (BN-LDP)	4,088
N58	Merotai	Sarifuddin Hata (WARISAN)	7,707	2,150	Azizul Tandek (PKS)	20	Pang Yuk Ming (BN-LDP)	4,088
N59	Tanjong Batu	Hamisa Samat (BN-UMNO)	8,538	1,986	Ismail Senang (WARISAN)	6,552	Hamisa Samat (BN-UMNO)	7,630
N59	Tanjong Batu	Hamisa Samat (BN-UMNO)	8,538	1,986	Usman Madeaming (GS-PAS)	1,506	Hamisa Samat (BN-UMNO)	7,630
N59	Tanjong Batu	Hamisa Samat (BN-UMNO)	8,538	1,986	Ardi Arsah (USA-PPRS)	171	Hamisa Samat (BN-UMNO)	7,630
N60	Sebatik	Abdul Muis Picho (BN-UMNO)	2,468	193	Hassan A. Gani Pg. Amir (WARISAN)	2,275	Abd Muis Picho (BN-UMNO)	4,140
N60	Sebatik	Abdul Muis Picho (BN-UMNO)	2,468	193	Roslan Ramli (GS-PAS)	504	Abd Muis Picho (BN-UMNO)	4,140
N60	Sebatik	Abdul Muis Picho (BN-UMNO)	2,468	193	Yusri Yunus (USA-PPRS)	38	Abd Muis Picho (BN-UMNO)	4,140
