= 2018 Penang state election =

Malaysian state election

- 9 May 2018

40 seats to the Penang State Legislative Assembly 21 seats needed for a majority
- Registered: 945,627 (▲11.75%)
- Turnout: 84.62% (▼2.60pp)
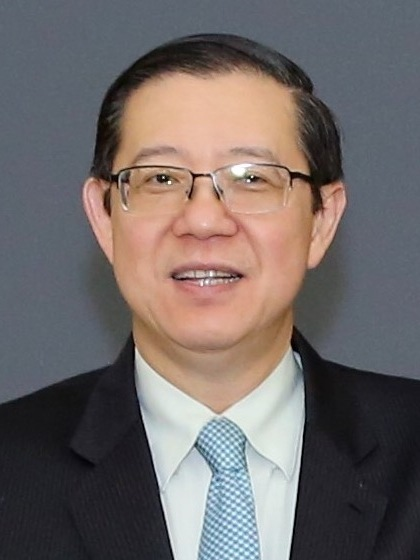

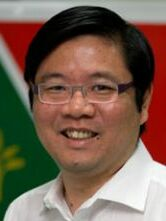
| | Majority party | Minority party | Third party |
|---|---|---|---|
| Leader | Lim Guan Eng | Teng Chang Yeow | Muhammad Fauzi |
| Party | DAP | GERAKAN | PAS |
| Alliance | PH | BN | GS |
| Leader since | 4 September 2004 | 22 April 2012 | Unknown |
| Leader's seat | Air Putih | Tanjong Bunga (lost) | Permatang Pasir (lost) |
| Last election | 29 seats, 61.31% (Pakatan Rakyat) | 10 seats, 32.06% | 1 seat, 6.17% (as Pakatan Rakyat and Love Malaysia Party) |
| Seats before | 29 | 10 | 1 |
| Seats won | 37 | 2 | 1 |
| Seat change | ▲8 | ▼8 | Steady |
| Popular vote | 530,008 | 176,723 | 77,171 |
| Percentage | 67.20% | 22.41% | 9.78% |
| Swing | ▲5.89% | ▼9.65% | ▲3.61% |
- Pakatan Harapan seats: DAP PKR BERSATU AMANAH Opposition seats: UMNO PAS
Chief Minister before election
Lim Guan Eng
Pakatan Harapan (DAP)
Elected Chief Minister
Chow Kon Yeow
Pakatan Harapan (DAP)

The 14th Penang election was held on 9 May 2018 to elect the State Assemblymen of the 14th Penang State Legislative Assembly, the legislature of the Malaysian state of Penang. The legislature had been dissolved on 9 April by the state's Governor, Abdul Rahman Abbas, on the advice of the then Chief Minister Lim Guan Eng, who also led the state's ruling Pakatan Harapan (PH) coalition.

The election was conducted by the Malaysian Election Commission and utilised the first-past-the-post system. Electoral candidates were nominated on 28 April. On 9 May, between 8.00 a.m. and 5.00 p.m. Malaysian time (UTC+8), polling was held in all 40 state constituencies throughout Penang; each constituency elects a single State Assemblyman to the state legislature.

The incumbent PH government secured a historic third term in a landslide victory, as it swept eight additional constituencies to hold 37 seats (out of 40) in the Penang State Legislative Assembly, commanding a supermajority in the legislature. Following the simultaneous Malaysian general election, which saw the PH forming Malaysia's federal government for the first time in the country's history, Chow Kon Yeow was selected as Penang's fifth Chief Minister, succeeding Lim who was appointed as the federal Minister of Finance.

== Background ==
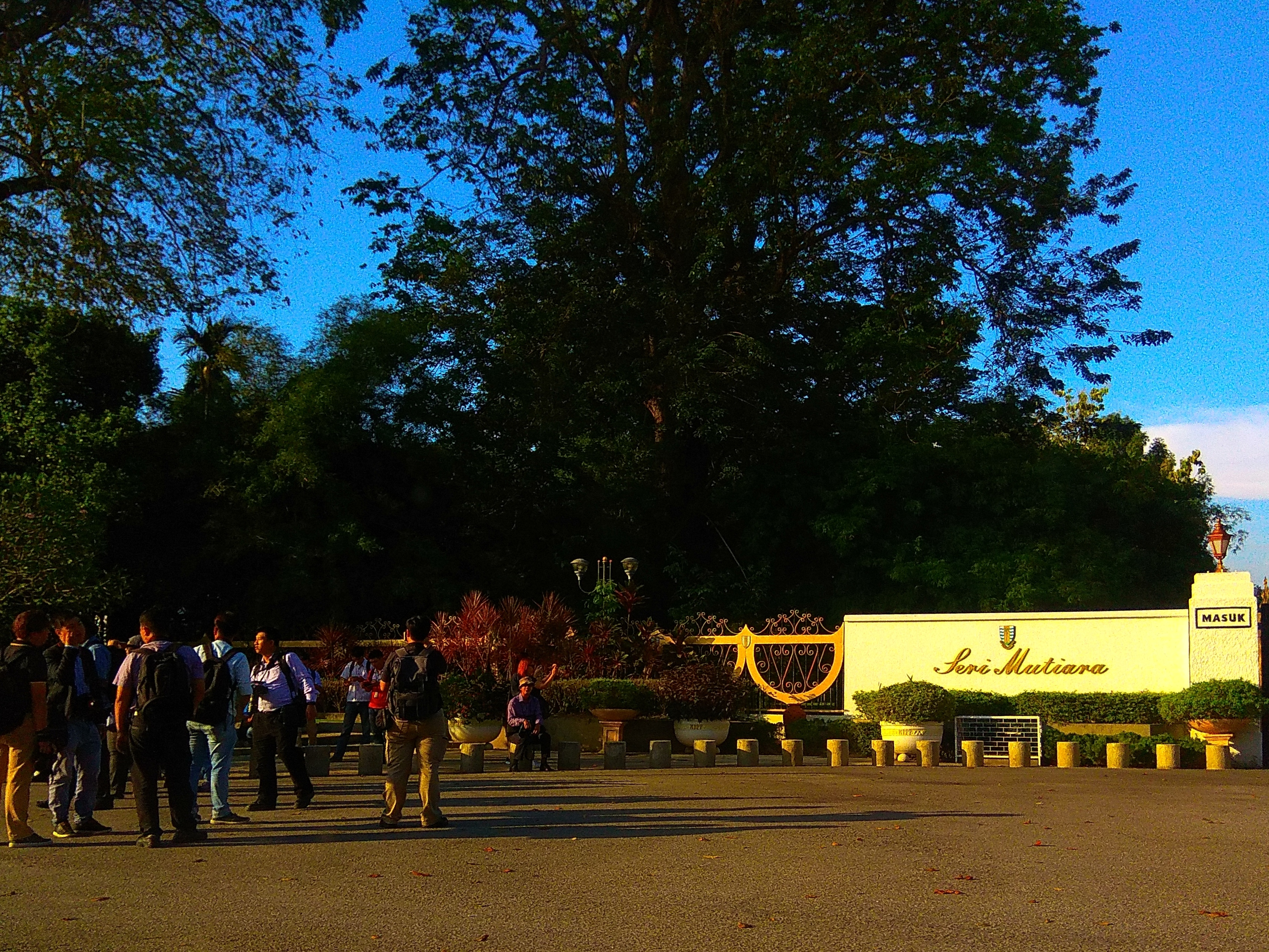
Journalists awaiting the arrival of the Chief Minister of Penang, Lim Guan Eng, at The Residency (the official residence of the governor of Penang) in George Town on 9 April 2018 for the dissolution of the Penang State Legislative Assembly.

The state election was the 14th state election in the State of Penang since the independence of Malaya (now Malaysia) in 1957. The governing Pakatan Harapan (PH) coalition sought to secure their third consecutive term in office since 2008.

According to the Constitution of the State of Penang, the maximum term of the Penang State Legislative Assembly, the legislature of Penang, is five years from the date of the first sitting of Assembly following a state election, after which it is dissolved by operation of law. The Assembly would have been automatically dissolved on 28 June 2018, the fifth anniversary of its first sitting on 28 June 2013.

However, the Chief Minister, as the head of government in Penang, may advise the Governor, the head of state, to dissolve the Assembly before the five-year period is up. Following the dissolution of the Malaysian Parliament by the then Malaysian Prime Minister, Najib Razak, on 7 April 2018, the Chief Minister of Penang at the time, Lim Guan Eng, was granted the consent of the governor of Penang, Abdul Rahman Abbas, on 9 April to dissolve the Assembly.

A state election must be held within sixty days after the dissolution. Accordingly, the Malaysian Election Commission set 28 April as the nomination day and 9 May as the polling day. The timing of the election, which was to be held on a weekday as opposed to the usual practice of holding elections on weekends, sparked outrage on social media.

=== Political parties ===
The Pakatan Harapan (PH), the ruling coalition in Penang, has been in power since 2008 and was led by the then Chief Minister Lim Guan Eng. In the aftermath of the 2013 state election, the PH controlled 29 out of the 40 seats in the Penang State Legislative Assembly.

The PH was challenged by two opposition coalitions, Barisan Nasional (BN) and Gagasan Sejahtera (GS), as well as a number of individual independent parties. The BN and GS coalitions were led by Teng Chang Yeow and Muhammad Fauzi Yusoff respectively.

| Coalition | | | Other parties |
| Incumbent | Opposition | | Other parties |
|---|---|---|---|
| Pakatan Harapan (PH) | Barisan Nasional (BN) | Gagasan Sejahtera (GS) | Malaysian United Party (MUP); Penang Front Party (PFP); Malaysian People's Party (PRM); Socialist Party of Malaysia (PSM) |
| Democratic Action Party (DAP); People's Justice Party (PKR); Malaysian United Indigenous Party (Bersatu); National Trust Party (Amanah) | United Malays National Organisation (UMNO); Malaysian People's Movement Party (Gerakan); Malaysian Chinese Association (MCA); Malaysian Indian Congress (MIC) | Malaysian Islamic Party (PAS); Love Malaysia Party (PCM); People's Alternative Party (PAP) | Malaysian United Party (MUP); Penang Front Party (PFP); Malaysian People's Party (PRM); Socialist Party of Malaysia (PSM) |

=== Electoral divisions ===
All 40 state constituencies within Penang, which constitute the Penang State Legislative Assembly, were contested during the election. The Malaysian Election Commission utilised the updated electoral roll as of the fourth quarter of 2017; voters who had registered by the end of 2017 were therefore eligible for polling. Penang had a total of 945,627 voters as of April 2018.

The state constituencies of Penang (in blue) as of 2013. Unlike most other states in the Peninsular, Penang was unaffected by

the Malaysian Election Commission's redelineation exercise prior to the 14th Malaysian general election.

DAP-controlled seats
PKR-controlled seats
UMNO-controlled seats
PAS-controlled seats

=== Electoral candidates ===
By 27 April 2018, 471 nomination forms for Penang's state constituencies had been sold by the Malaysian Election Commission, making this election the most hotly contested election in Penang's history. A total of 155 candidates vied for the 40 state constituencies.

| No. | Area | State constituency | Incumbent State Assemblyman | Number of voters | Candidate | | | |
| No. | Area | State constituency | Incumbent State Assemblyman | Number of voters | PH | BN | GS | Ind |
|---|---|---|---|---|---|---|---|---|
| N01 | Seberang Perai | Penaga | Mohd Zain Ahmad (BN) | 19,089 | - | Mohd Zain Ahmad (UMNO) | Mohd Yusni Mat Piah (PAS) | - |
| N02 | Seberang Perai | Bertam | Shariful Azhar Othman (BN) | 18,378 | Khaliq Mehtab Mohd Ishaq (Bersatu) | Shariful Azhar Othman (UMNO) | Moktar Ramly (PAS) | - |
| N03 | Seberang Perai | Pinang Tunggal | Roslan Saidin (BN) | 23,056 | Ahmad Zakiyuddin Abdul Rahman (PKR) | Roslan Saidin (UMNO) | Bukhori Ghazali (PAS) | - |
| N04 | Seberang Perai | Permatang Berangan | Omar Abd Hamid (BN) | 21,120 | Mohd Shariff Omar (Bersatu) | Nor Hafizah Othman (UMNO) | Mohd Sobri Saleh (PAS) | Azman Shah Othman (PRM) |
| N05 | Seberang Perai | Sungai Dua | Muhamad Yusoff Mohd Noor (BN) | 20,558 | Yusri Isahak (Amanah) | Muhamad Yusoff Mohd Noor (UMNO) | Zahadi Hj. Mohd (PAS) | - |
| N06 | Seberang Perai | Telok Ayer Tawar | Jahara Hamid (BN) | 19,172 | Mustafa Kamal Ahmad (PKR) | Zamri Che Ros (UMNO) | Mohamad Hanif Haron (PAS) | Lee Thian Hong (PRM) |
| N07 | Seberang Perai | Sungai Puyu | Phee Boon Poh (PH) | 27,671 | Phee Boon Poh (DAP) | Lim Hai Song (MCA) | - | Tan Lay Hock (PRM) |
| N07 | Seberang Perai | Sungai Puyu | Phee Boon Poh (PH) | 27,671 | Phee Boon Poh (DAP) | Lim Hai Song (MCA) | - | Ong Yin Yin (PFP) |
| N07 | Seberang Perai | Sungai Puyu | Phee Boon Poh (PH) | 27,671 | Phee Boon Poh (DAP) | Lim Hai Song (MCA) | - | Neoh Bok Keng (MUP) |
| N08 | Seberang Perai | Bagan Jermal | Lim Hock Seng (PH) | 25,621 | Soon Lip Chee (DAP) | Ang Chor Keong (MCA) | - | Teoh Chai Deng (PRM) |
| N08 | Seberang Perai | Bagan Jermal | Lim Hock Seng (PH) | 25,621 | Soon Lip Chee (DAP) | Ang Chor Keong (MCA) | - | Fabian George Albart (PFP) |
| N08 | Seberang Perai | Bagan Jermal | Lim Hock Seng (PH) | 25,621 | Soon Lip Chee (DAP) | Ang Chor Keong (MCA) | - | Hari Devydrai (MUP) |
| N09 | Seberang Perai | Bagan Dalam | Tanasekharan Autherapady (PH) | 18,291 | Satees Muniandy (DAP) | Dhinagaran Jayabalan (MIC) | - | Teoh Huck Ping (PRM) |
| N09 | Seberang Perai | Bagan Dalam | Tanasekharan Autherapady (PH) | 18,291 | Satees Muniandy (DAP) | Dhinagaran Jayabalan (MIC) | - | Teoh Uat Lye (MUP) |
| N09 | Seberang Perai | Bagan Dalam | Tanasekharan Autherapady (PH) | 18,291 | Satees Muniandy (DAP) | Dhinagaran Jayabalan (MIC) | - | Jasper Ooi Zong Han (PFP) |
| N10 | Seberang Perai | Seberang Jaya | Afif Bahardin (PH) | 35,541 | Afif Bahardin (PKR) | Abu Bakar Sidekh Zainul Abidin (UMNO) | Ahmad Rafaei Rashid (PAS) | - |
| N11 | Seberang Perai | Permatang Pasir | Mohd Salleh Man (GS) | 24,811 | Faiz Fadzil (Amanah) | Anuar Faisal Yahaya (UMNO) | Muhammad Fauzi Yusoff (PAS) | - |
| N12 | Seberang Perai | Penanti | Norlela Ariffin (PH) | 21,437 | Norlela Ariffin (PKR) | Suhaimi Sabudin (UMNO) | Fawwaz Mohamad Jan (PAS) | - |
| N13 | Seberang Perai | Berapit | Ong Kok Fooi (PH) | 23,779 | Heng Lee Lee (DAP) | Goh Swee Gim (MCA) | - | Song Chee Meng (PRM) |
| N13 | Seberang Perai | Berapit | Ong Kok Fooi (PH) | 23,779 | Heng Lee Lee (DAP) | Goh Swee Gim (MCA) | - | Lee Poh Kong (PFP) |
| N14 | Seberang Perai | Machang Bubuk | Lee Khai Loon (PH) | 37,260 | Lee Khai Loon (PKR) | Tan Teik Cheng (Gerakan) | Jamil Abdul Rahman (PAS) | Tang Ah Ba (PRM) |
| N14 | Seberang Perai | Machang Bubuk | Lee Khai Loon (PH) | 37,260 | Lee Khai Loon (PKR) | Tan Teik Cheng (Gerakan) | Jamil Abdul Rahman (PAS) | Lim Jhun Hou (MUP) |
| N15 | Seberang Perai | Padang Lalang | Chong Eng (PH) | 27,959 | Chong Eng (DAP) | Kuan Hin Yeep (MCA) | - | Lai Yean Nee (PRM) |
| N15 | Seberang Perai | Padang Lalang | Chong Eng (PH) | 27,959 | Chong Eng (DAP) | Kuan Hin Yeep (MCA) | - | Liew Ee Jin (PFP) |
| N16 | Seberang Perai | Perai | Ramasamy Palanisamy (PH) | 17,032 | Ramasamy Palanisamy (DAP) | Suresh Muniandy (MIC) | Asoghan Govindaraju (PAP) | Samuganathan Muniandy (PRM) |
| N16 | Seberang Perai | Perai | Ramasamy Palanisamy (PH) | 17,032 | Ramasamy Palanisamy (DAP) | Suresh Muniandy (MIC) | Asoghan Govindaraju (PAP) | Patrick Ooi Khar Giap (PFP) |
| N16 | Seberang Perai | Perai | Ramasamy Palanisamy (PH) | 17,032 | Ramasamy Palanisamy (DAP) | Suresh Muniandy (MIC) | Asoghan Govindaraju (PAP) | Isumary Retnam |
| N17 | Seberang Perai | Bukit Tengah | Ong Chin Wen (PH) | 22,276 | Gooi Hsiao-Leung (PKR) | Thor Teong Gee (Gerakan) | Norazman Ishak (PAS) | Tan Hiang Lye (PRM) |
| N17 | Seberang Perai | Bukit Tengah | Ong Chin Wen (PH) | 22,276 | Gooi Hsiao-Leung (PKR) | Thor Teong Gee (Gerakan) | Norazman Ishak (PAS) | Joseph Edward (PFP) |
| N18 | Seberang Perai | Bukit Tambun | Law Choo Kiang (PH) | 26,086 | Goh Choon Aik (PKR) | Hartini Tan Abdullah (Gerakan) | Kumaravelu Arumugam (PAS) | Goh Bee Koon (PRM) |
| N18 | Seberang Perai | Bukit Tambun | Law Choo Kiang (PH) | 26,086 | Goh Choon Aik (PKR) | Hartini Tan Abdullah (Gerakan) | Kumaravelu Arumugam (PAS) | Ong Seong Lu (PFP) |
| N19 | Seberang Perai | Jawi | Soon Lip Chee (PH) | 26,699 | H’ng Mooi Lye (DAP) | Kiew Hen Chong (MCA) | Tan Beng Huat (PAP) | Tan Chew Suan (PRM) |
| N19 | Seberang Perai | Jawi | Soon Lip Chee (PH) | 26,699 | H’ng Mooi Lye (DAP) | Kiew Hen Chong (MCA) | Tan Beng Huat (PAP) | Koay Xing Boon (MUP) |
| N19 | Seberang Perai | Jawi | Soon Lip Chee (PH) | 26,699 | H’ng Mooi Lye (DAP) | Kiew Hen Chong (MCA) | Tan Beng Huat (PAP) | Daphne Edward (PFP) |
| N20 | Seberang Perai | Sungai Bakap | Maktar Shapee (PH) | 26,666 | Amar Pritpal Abdullah (PKR) | Mohamed Sani Bakar (UMNO) | Osman Jaafar (PAS) | Tan Chow Kang (PRM) |
| N21 | Seberang Perai | Sungai Acheh | Mahmud Zakaria (BN) | 20,018 | Zulkifli Ibrahim (PKR) | Mahmud Zakaria (UMNO) | Nor Zamri Latiff (PAS) | - |
| N22 | Penang Island | Tanjong Bunga | Teh Yee Cheu (PH) | 21,768 | Zairil Khir Johari (DAP) | Teng Chang Yeow (Gerakan) | - | Chua Cheong Wee (PRM) |
| N22 | Penang Island | Tanjong Bunga | Teh Yee Cheu (PH) | 21,768 | Zairil Khir Johari (DAP) | Teng Chang Yeow (Gerakan) | - | Lee Zheng Yong (MUP) |
| N23 | Penang Island | Air Putih | Lim Guan Eng (PH) | 13,509 | Lim Guan Eng (DAP) | Tang Heap Seng (MCA) | Manikandan Ramayah (PCM) | Tan Gim Theam (MUP) |
| N24 | Penang Island | Kebun Bunga | Cheah Kah Peng (PH) | 21,369 | Ong Khan Lee (PKR) | Ooi Zhi Yi (Gerakan) | - | Wu Kai Min (MUP) |
| N25 | Penang Island | Pulau Tikus | Yap Soo Huey (PH) | 18,423 | Chris Lee Chun Kit (DAP) | Loo Jieh Sheng (Gerakan) | - | Wee Kean Wai (MUP) |
| N26 | Penang Island | Padang Kota | Chow Kon Yeow (PH) | 14,476 | Chow Kon Yeow (DAP) | H'ng Khoon Leng (Gerakan) | - | Goh Saik Wei (MUP) |
| N27 | Penang Island | Pengkalan Kota | Lau Keng Ee (PH) | 20,069 | Gooi Zi Sen (DAP) | Lim Swee Bok (MCA) | - | Chew Seng Tung (PRM) |
| N27 | Penang Island | Pengkalan Kota | Lau Keng Ee (PH) | 20,069 | Gooi Zi Sen (DAP) | Lim Swee Bok (MCA) | - | Koay Teng Lye (MUP) |
| N27 | Penang Island | Pengkalan Kota | Lau Keng Ee (PH) | 20,069 | Gooi Zi Sen (DAP) | Lim Swee Bok (MCA) | - | Ragindran Sivasamy |
| N28 | Penang Island | Komtar | Teh Lai Heng (PH) | 15,041 | Teh Lai Heng (DAP) | Tan Hing Teik (MCA) | - | Ong Chun Jiet (MUP) |
| N29 | Penang Island | Datok Keramat | Jagdeep Singh Deo (PH) | 22,630 | Jagdeep Singh Deo (DAP) | Lee Boon Ten (Gerakan) | - | Nicholas Diane Morgan (PFP) |
| N29 | Penang Island | Datok Keramat | Jagdeep Singh Deo (PH) | 22,630 | Jagdeep Singh Deo (DAP) | Lee Boon Ten (Gerakan) | - | Lim Boo Chang (MUP) |
| N29 | Penang Island | Datok Keramat | Jagdeep Singh Deo (PH) | 22,630 | Jagdeep Singh Deo (DAP) | Lee Boon Ten (Gerakan) | - | Muhammad Majnun Abdul Wahab |
| N30 | Penang Island | Sungai Pinang | Lim Siew Khim (PH) | 26,917 | Lim Siew Khim (DAP) | Ng Fook On (Gerakan) | Yacoob Omar (PAS) | Teh Yee Cheu (PSM) |
| N30 | Penang Island | Sungai Pinang | Lim Siew Khim (PH) | 26,917 | Lim Siew Khim (DAP) | Ng Fook On (Gerakan) | Yacoob Omar (PAS) | Tan Sim Bee (MUP) |
| N30 | Penang Island | Sungai Pinang | Lim Siew Khim (PH) | 26,917 | Lim Siew Khim (DAP) | Ng Fook On (Gerakan) | Yacoob Omar (PAS) | Mohamed Yacoob Mohamed Noor |
| N31 | Penang Island | Batu Lancang | Law Heng Kiang (PH) | 27,444 | Ong Ah Teong (DAP) | Koo Pei Chee (Gerakan) | - | Kee Lean Ee (MUP) |
| N32 | Penang Island | Seri Delima | RSN Rayer (PH) | 25,232 | Syerleena Abdul Rashid (DAP) | Khoo Kay Teong (MCA) | - | Tan Yang Yung (MUP) |
| N33 | Penang Island | Air Itam | Wong Hon Wai (PH) | 19,622 | Joseph Ng Soon Seong (DAP) | Tan Kah Leong (Gerakan) | - | Kang Teik Woi (MUP) |
| N34 | Penang Island | Paya Terubong | Yeoh Soon Hin (PH) | 46,741 | Yeoh Soon Hin (DAP) | Wong Chin Chong (MCA) | - | Kuan Aun Wan (MUP) |
| N35 | Penang Island | Batu Uban | Jayabalan Thambyappa (PH) | 31,924 | Kumaresan Aramugam (PKR) | Hng Chee Wey (Gerakan) | Vikneswaran Muniandy (PAS) | Teoh Kean Liang (PFP) |
| N35 | Penang Island | Batu Uban | Jayabalan Thambyappa (PH) | 31,924 | Kumaresan Aramugam (PKR) | Hng Chee Wey (Gerakan) | Vikneswaran Muniandy (PAS) | Teoh Kok Siang (MUP) |
| N36 | Penang Island | Pantai Jerejak | Mohd Rashid Hasnon (PH) | 23,646 | Saifuddin Nasution Ismail (PKR) | Oh Tong Keong (Gerakan) | Mohd Farhan Yusri (PAS) | Yim Boon Leong (MUP) |
| N37 | Penang Island | Batu Maung | Abdul Malik Abdul Kassim (PH) | 35,210 | Abdul Halim Hussain (PKR) | Liakat Ali Mohamed Ali (UMNO) | Saiful Lizan Md Yusuf (PAS) | - |
| N38 | Penang Island | Bayan Lepas | Nordin Ahmad (BN) | 26,570 | Azrul Mahathir Aziz (Amanah) | Rusli Hashim (UMNO) | Zarina Shinta Madar (PAS) | - |
| N39 | Penang Island | Pulau Betong | Muhamad Farid Saad (BN) | 18,177 | Mohd Tuah Ismail (PKR) | Muhamad Farid Saad (UMNO) | Muhd Taufik Hashim (PAS) | Yeoh Cheng Huat (PRM) |
| N40 | Penang Island | Telok Bahang | Shah Haedan Ayoob Hussain Shah (BN) | 14,339 | Zolkifly Md Lazim (Bersatu) | Shah Haedan Ayoob Hussain Shah (UMNO) | Mohd Ali Othman (PAS) | - |

== Timeline ==
| Date | Event |
|---|---|
| 9 April 2018 | Dissolution of the Penang State Legislative Assembly |
| 11 April 2018 | Issue of the Writ of Election |
| 28 April 2018 | Nomination day |
| 28 April - 9 May 2018 | Campaigning period |
| 5 May 2018 | Early voting for postal and advance voters |
| 9 May 2018 | Polling day |

=== Pre-nomination events ===
| Date | Event |
|---|---|
| 29 October 2017 | Tanjong Bunga State Assemblyman Teh Yee Cheu states his intention to quit the Democratic Action Party (DAP) prior to the upcoming election. Teh later announces that he will contest in the Sungai Pinang constituency as an independent candidate under the banner of the Socialist Party of Malaysia (PSM). |
| 16 January 2018 | Malaysian Chinese Association (MCA), a component party of the Barisan Nasional (BN), reveals that it will contest in 10 of the state seats. |
| 4 February 2018 | Permatang Pasir State Assemblyman Mohd Salleh Man is dropped out as an election candidate by the leadership of the Malaysian Islamic Party (PAS). |
| 11 March 2018 | Pakatan Harapan (PH) announces the final seat allocation among its four component parties during a rally at the Esplanade in George Town. |
| 14 March 2018 | Pulau Tikus State Assemblyman Yap Soo Huey announces that she will not defend her constituency in the upcoming election. |
| 20 March 2018 | BN kicks off its campaign by indiscriminately pasting anti-PH posters throughout George Town. The move is condemned by, among others, Tenaga Nasional and the Penang Island City Council, with the latter removing all the posters within the same day. BN is subsequently fined RM13,448 by the city council for the illegal pasting of politically charged material. |
| 28 March 2018 | The Malaysian Parliament approves the redelineation of electoral constituencies, which was conducted by the Malaysian Election Commission. Penang is unaffected by the redelineation exercise. |
| 28 March 2018 | One of the two Deputy Chief Ministers of Penang and Pantai Jerejak State Assemblyman, Mohd Rashid Hasnon, confirms that he will be relocated out of the state to Johor for the upcoming elections. |
| 9 April 2018 | The Chief Minister of Penang, Lim Guan Eng, declares the dissolution of the Penang State Legislative Assembly, after obtaining the consent of the Governor of Penang, Abdul Rahman Abbas. |
| 10 April 2018 | The Malaysian Election Commission sets 28 April as the nomination day and 9 May as the polling day; this provides for a minimum campaigning period of 11 days. |
| 10 April 2018 | Parti Rakyat Malaysia (PRM) states that it will be contesting in 18 of the state constituencies in Penang, and announces its candidates for the 18 seats. |
| 12 April 2018 | DAP announces that Chong Eng is retained for the Padang Lalang constituency, whilst Heng Lee Lee will be making her political debut in Berapit, replacing the latter's incumbent Ong Kok Fooi. |
| 12 April 2018 | The Malaysian Prime Minister and BN chairman, Najib Razak, tells voters in Balik Pulau to vote for BN, or get "nothing" if PH still retains Penang. Chief Minister Lim Guan Eng subsequently slams Najib's ultimatum, stating that it is tantamount to "a threat to the country's democratic system". |
| 14 April 2018 | National Trust Party (Amanah), a component party of the PH, reveals its candidates for the three state constituencies it is contesting, namely Bayan Lepas, Permatang Pasir and Sungai Dua. |
| 15 April 2018 | BN unveils its Penang-specific manifesto during an event in Seberang Jaya. |
| 16 April 2018 | Malaysian United Indigenous Party (Bersatu), a component party of the PH, announces its candidates for the four state constituencies it is contesting, namely Bertam, Penaga, Permatang Berangan and Telok Bahang. However, the candidate for Penaga, Yaakob Osman, is disqualified on nomination day due to his bankruptcy issues. |
| 19 April 2018 | DAP candidates for Tanjong Bunga, Air Putih and Pulau Tikus state constituencies are announced. In particular, Lim Guan Eng, the Chief Minister of Penang who also serves as the incumbent Air Putih State Assemblyman, will be defending the seat for the third consecutive time since 2008, whilst Chris Lee Chun Kit, an ex-councillor of the Penang Island City Council, will be making his political debut in Pulau Tikus. |
| 19 April 2018 | PAS declares that it will be contesting in 18 of the state constituencies in Penang, and announces its candidates for the 18 seats. |
| 20 April 2018 | DAP candidates for Seri Delima, Air Itam and Paya Terubong state constituencies are announced. Two ex-councillors of the Penang Island City Council, Syerleena Abdul Rashid and Joseph Ng Soon Seong, will be making their political debut in Seri Delima and Air Itam respectively. |
| 21 April 2018 | DAP candidates for Sungai Puyu, Bagan Jermal, Bagan Dalam, Perai, Jawi, Padang Kota, Pengkalan Kota, Komtar, Datok Keramat, Sungai Pinang and Batu Lancang state constituencies are announced. These include four new candidates - Satees Muniandy (Bagan Dalam), H’ng Mooi Lye (Jawi), Gooi Zi Sen (Pengkalan Kota) and Ong Ah Teong (Batu Lancang). |
| 22 April 2018 | The Malaysian United Party (MUP) announces its candidates for 20 of the state constituencies. |
| 24 April 2018 | The People's Justice Party (PKR), a component party of the PH, names its candidates for 14 of the state constituencies in Penang, namely Pinang Tunggal, Telok Ayer Tawar, Seberang Jaya, Penanti, Machang Bubuk, Bukit Tengah, Bukit Tambun, Sungai Bakap, Sungai Acheh, Kebun Bunga, Batu Uban, Pantai Jerejak, Batu Maung and Pulau Betong. Notably, the party's secretary-general, Saifuddin Nasution Ismail, will contest in Pantai Jerejak, replacing the seat's incumbent and Deputy Chief Minister I of Penang, Mohd Rashid Hasnon. |
| 24 April 2018 | BN reveals its candidates for all of the state constituencies in Penang. |
| 25 April 2018 | PH unveils its Penang-specific manifesto at the Penang Chinese Town Hall in George Town. |
| 25 April 2018 | Penang Front Party (PFP) announces its candidates for 13 of the state constituencies. |
| 25 April 2018 | Love Malaysia Party (PCM), a component party of the Gagasan Sejahtera (GS) coalition, announces its sole electoral candidate, who will contest the Air Putih state constituency. |
| 27 April 2018 | GS reveals its candidates for Machang Bubok, Perai, Bukit Tambun, Jawi and Batu Uban state constituencies. |

=== Nomination centres ===
| Constituency | Nomination centre |
|---|---|
| Penaga | Kepala Batas Industrial Training Institute |
| Bertam | Kepala Batas Industrial Training Institute |
| Pinang Tunggal | Kepala Batas Industrial Training Institute |
| Permatang Berangan | Sungai Dua Community Hall |
| Sungai Dua | Sungai Dua Community Hall |
| Telok Ayer Tawar | Sungai Dua Community Hall |
| Sungai Puyu | SRJK (C) Kwang Hua |
| Bagan Jermal | SRJK (C) Kwang Hua |
| Bagan Dalam | SRJK (C) Kwang Hua |
| Seberang Jaya | National Institute of Youth Skills (IKTBN), Bukit Mertajam |
| Permatang Pasir | National Institute of Youth Skills (IKTBN), Bukit Mertajam |
| Penanti | National Institute of Youth Skills (IKTBN), Bukit Mertajam |
| Berapit | Jit Sin High School |
| Machang Bubuk | Jit Sin High School |
| Padang Lalang | Jit Sin High School |
| Perai | Seberang Perai Vocational College |
| Bukit Tengah | Seberang Perai Vocational College |
| Bukit Tambun | Seberang Perai Vocational College |
| Jawi | Jawi Multi-purpose Hall |
| Sungai Bakap | Jawi Multi-purpose Hall |
| Sungai Acheh | Jawi Multi-purpose Hall |
| Tanjong Bunga | Caring Society Complex, George Town |
| Air Putih | Caring Society Complex, George Town |
| Kebun Bunga | Caring Society Complex, George Town |
| Pulau Tikus | Caring Society Complex, George Town |
| Padang Kota | Dewan Sri Pinang, George Town |
| Pengkalan Kota | Dewan Sri Pinang, George Town |
| Komtar | Dewan Sri Pinang, George Town |
| Datok Keramat | Penang Free School |
| Sungai Pinang | Penang Free School |
| Batu Lancang | Penang Free School |
| Seri Delima | Chung Hwa Confucian High School |
| Air Itam | Chung Hwa Confucian High School |
| Paya Terubong | Chung Hwa Confucian High School |
| Batu Uban | SRJK (C) Min Sin |
| Pantai Jerejak | SRJK (C) Min Sin |
| Batu Maung | SRJK (C) Min Sin |
| Bayan Lepas | Balik Pulau Municipal Sports Complex |
| Pulau Betong | Balik Pulau Municipal Sports Complex |
| Telok Bahang | Balik Pulau Municipal Sports Complex |

== Campaign ==
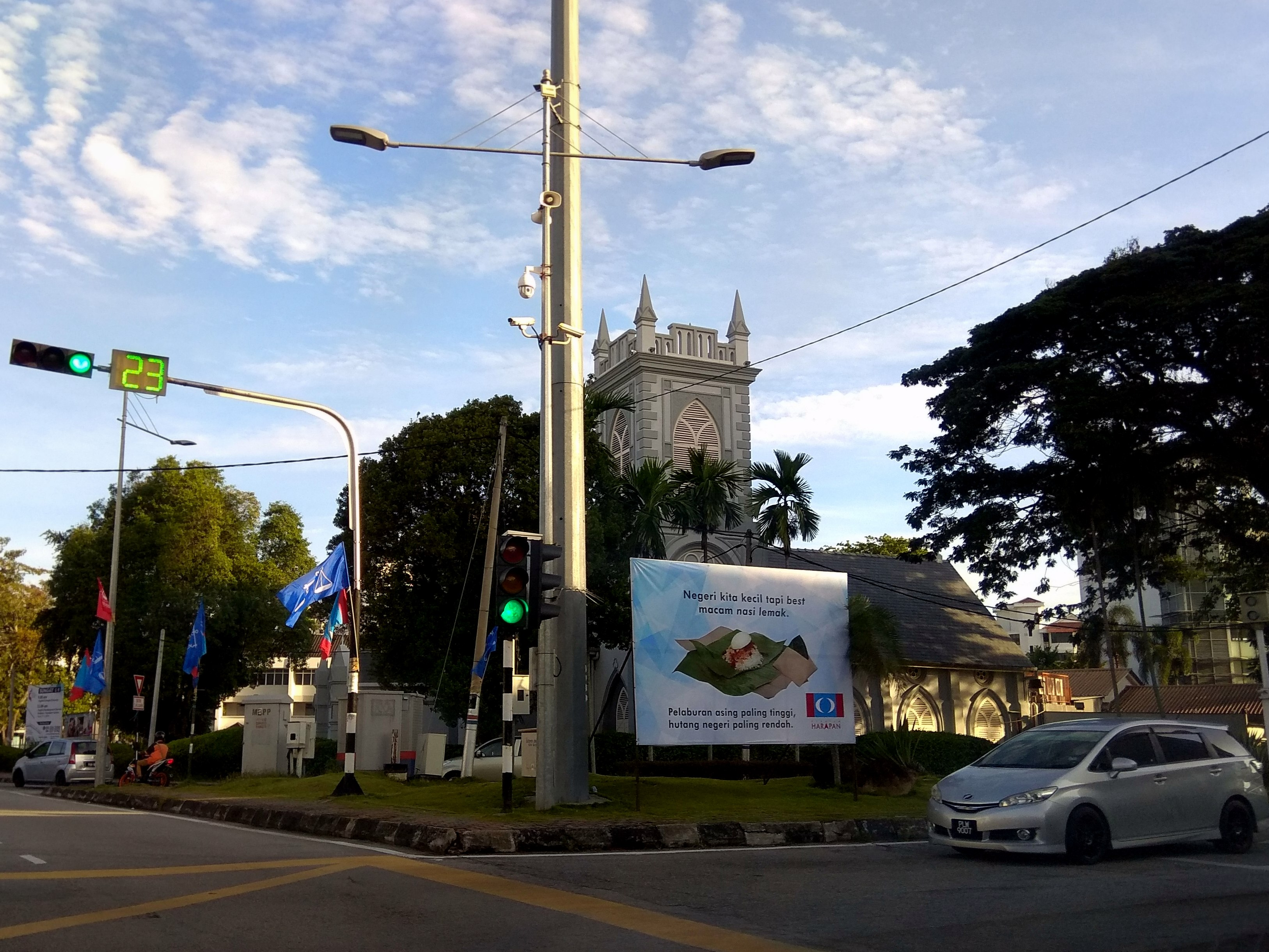
A Pakatan Harapan (PH) banner at Burmah Road in George Town uses nasi lemak as an analogy for Penang's position as the top destination in Malaysia for foreign direct investment, as well as the state's low public debt. In an unprecedented move, PH banners depicting famous local dishes have been placed throughout the city.

Analysts and news agencies, including Channel NewsAsia, The Straits Times and The Edge, predicted another victory for the Pakatan Harapan (PH) in Penang, due to the PH-led state government's achievements in social welfare and infrastructural developments, as well as Penang's economic growth under PH's tenure. Even so, the election was still hotly contested over several issues, including the vulnerability of the city-state to natural disasters such as floods and landslides, the proposed Penang Undersea Tunnel, transportation and public housing.

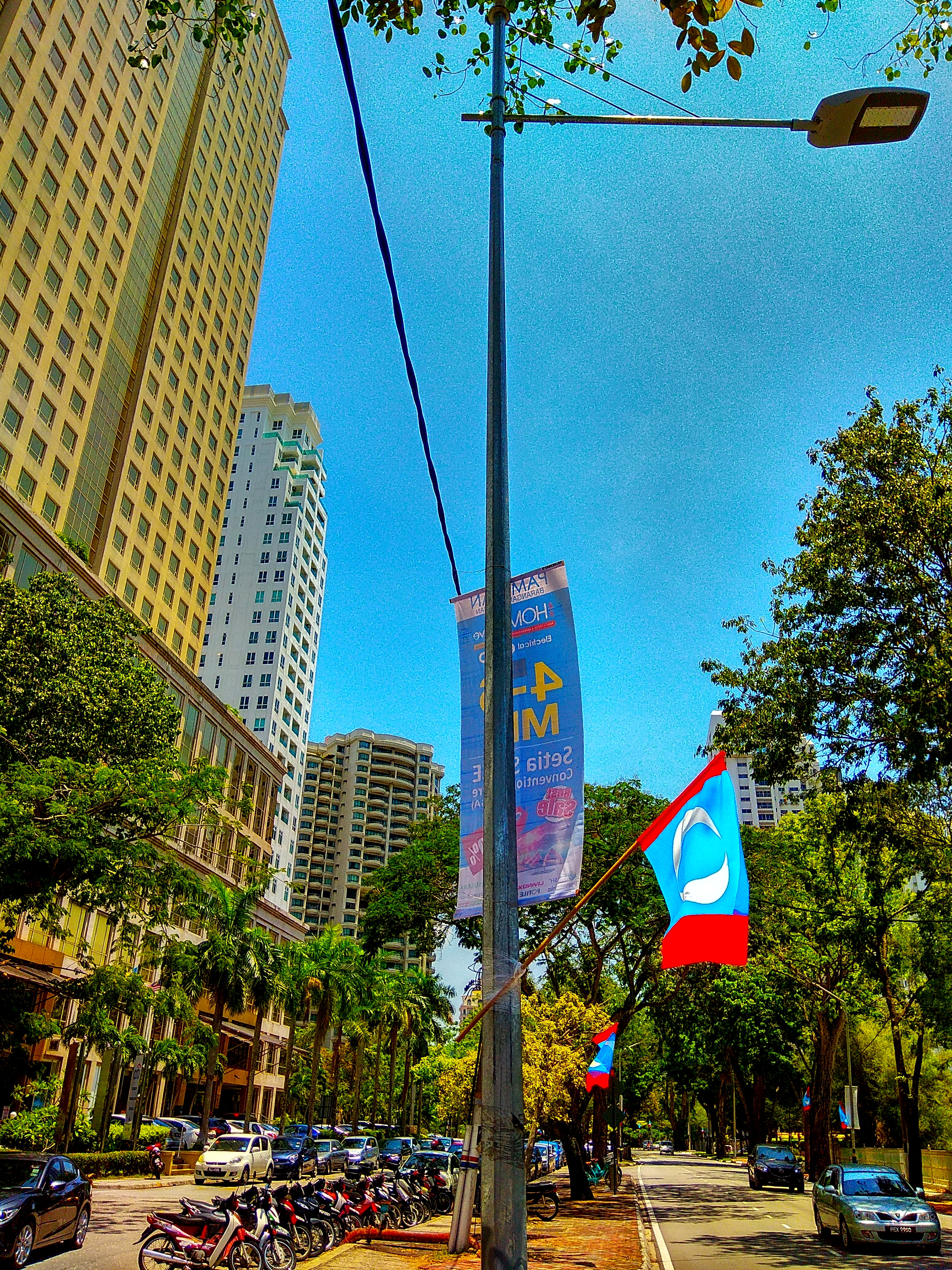
Flags of the People's Justice Party (PKR) in George Town. The PKR banner serves as the common election symbol of the Pakatan Harapan coalition, hence its use by the coalition's other component parties, DAP, Amanah and Bersatu.

In particular, the PH administration placed considerable emphasis on Penang's achievements under its tenure, such as the state's solid economic performance, rapid development, overall cleanliness, public housing and the administration's social welfare policies. These were seen in contrast to the perceived discrimination of Penang by the Barisan Nasional-led federal government, especially in matters ranging from transportation to the lack of financial aid for Penang's flood victims.

=== Manifestos ===
==== Barisan Nasional ====
The Barisan Nasional (BN) coalition launched its Penang-specific manifesto on 15 April 2018 in Seberang Jaya. It pledged, among others, to create a special fund for first time married couples, ban construction projects at hill slopes and at areas 250 ft (76 m) above sea level, build low-cost houses (priced at RM40,000 each) in its Rent-To-Own Housing Schemes, and solve traffic congestion within the city-state. These were in addition to the previous promises made by various BN politicians, including the Malaysian Prime Minister and BN chairman, Najib Razak, to abolish toll charges for motorcycles on the Penang Bridge and to scrap the Penang Undersea Tunnel project, which had been proposed by Penang's Pakatan Harapan (PH) administration. BN politicians also claimed that the PH-led state government had failed to fulfil 51 promises and attempted to attract public attention on this issue by illegally pasting anti PH-posters throughout George Town on 20 March.

In response, the state government, led by the then Chief Minister Lim Guan Eng, slammed BN for deliberately copying the administration's policies into the BN manifesto, stating for the record that the government's policies, including social welfare programmes and reduced assessment rates for low-cost housing, have already been implemented. Notably, the BN manifesto failed to address the need for a rail-based public transportation system, such as LRT and monorail, within Penang; Lim maintained that the BN manifesto "offered no alternatives to building a public transport system to alleviate traffic congestion except to sabotage our proposed LRT and under-sea tunnel projects". Meanwhile, Jagdeep Singh Deo, the incumbent State Assemblyman for Datok Keramat, refuted BN's claims that Penang's PH-led state government had failed to provide affordable housing, reporting that more than 25,000 units of affordable housing have, in fact, been completed within the state. Critics also assert that the BN-led federal government has consistently discriminated the State of Penang by withholding major infrastructure projects and financial grants to the state.

==== Pakatan Harapan ====
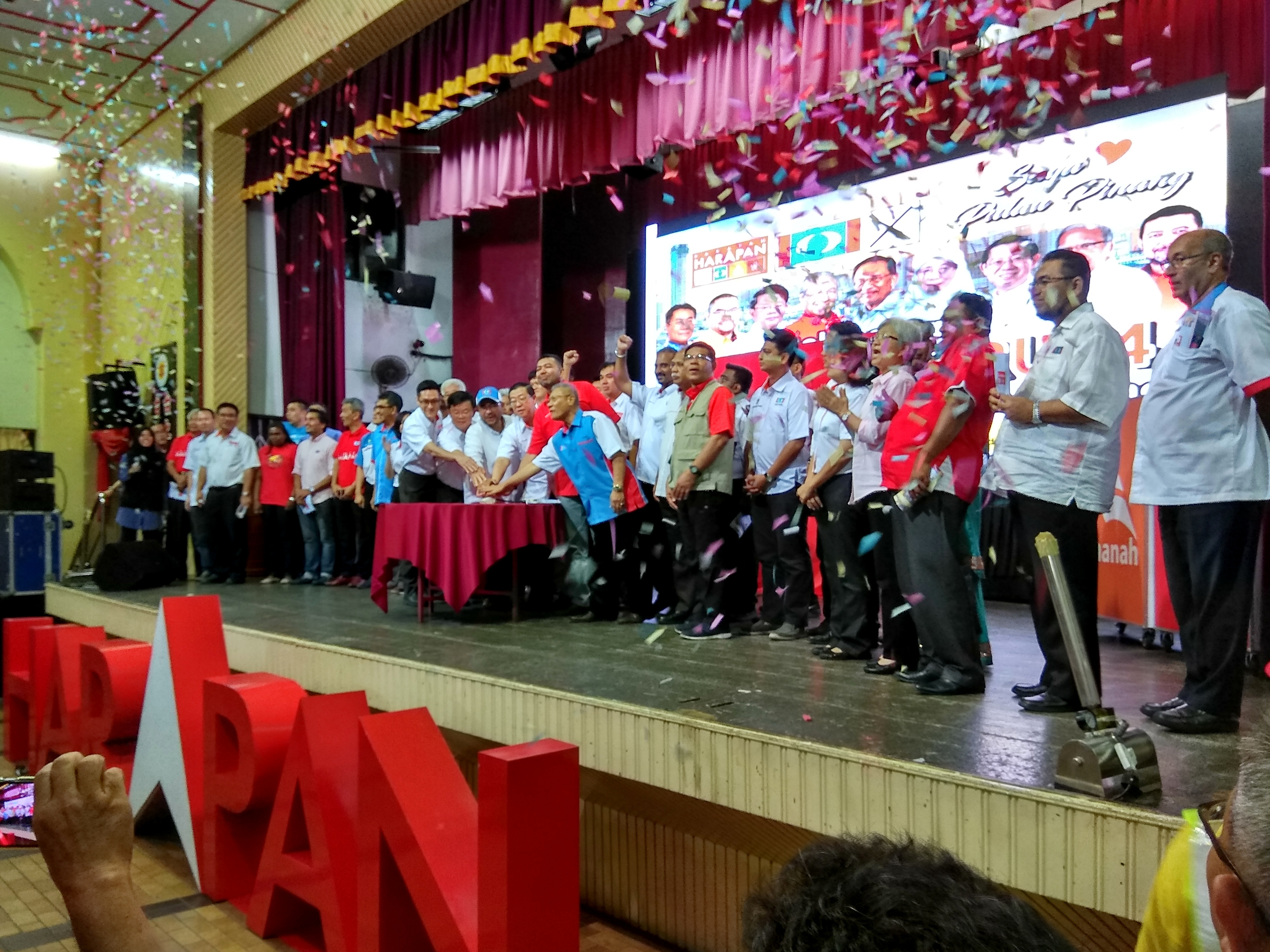
The launch of Pakatan Harapan's Penang manifesto at the Penang Chinese Town Hall in George Town on 25 April 2018.

The Pakatan Harapan (PH) coalition unveiled its Penang-specific manifesto on 25 April 2018 at the Penang Chinese Town Hall in George Town. The manifesto encompasses 68 pledges, including the implementation of the Penang Transport Master Plan which incorporates the proposed LRT and monorail services throughout the city-state, the construction of the Penang Undersea Tunnel, free-of-charge public bus services, a health-care programme which offers financial aid for lower-income households, a varsity township in Balik Pulau, the completion of more than 75,000 affordable housing units by 2025, a wider variety of public infrastructure, and a two-term limit for the position of the Chief Minister. In officiating the launch of the manifesto, PH leaders in Penang also promised financial funding for Islamic schools in the state and the promotion of interfaith harmony through the construction of a 'Harmony Centre' for non-Muslim affairs.

==== Comparison of BN and PH manifestos ====
| Manifesto | BN | PH |
|---|---|---|
| Transportation | Cancellation of the Penang Undersea Tunnel project; Construction of interchanges for congestion-prone roads and expressways | Penang Transport Master Plan, which includes the following proposals; LRT lines; George Town - Bayan Lepas; George Town - Butterworth; Monorail lines; George Town - Tanjung Tokong; George Town - Air Itam; Butterworth - Bukit Mertajam; George Town tram system; Construction of the Penang Undersea Tunnel; Free public bus services within both Penang Island and Seberang Perai |
| Public housing | Construction of 65,000 affordable housing units | Completion of 75,361 affordable housing units by 2025 |
| Social welfare | Establishment of a special fund for first-time marriages of up to RM2,000 per couple | Financial assistance of RM300 for each household with monthly income of less than RM5,000 to cover medical expenses; Financial assistance of RM1,000 for women with monthly income below RM2,000; Increase in welfare payments for the elderly and the disabled to RM200 |
| Education | - | Allocation of land for the first Tamil-medium secondary school in Penang; Annual financial assistance of RM20 million for vernacular and Islamic religious schools in Penang; Construction of a university township in Balik Pulau |
| Economic development | - | Construction of a RM50 million SMART Centre to develop small and medium enterprises (SME) |
| Harmonious community | - | Islamic faith to be enhanced via the sponsorship of religious programmes; Increase in funding for the Penang Hindu Endowments Board to RM1.5 million annually; Construction of a RM3 million 'Harmony Centre' for non-Muslim affairs |
| Safety | - | Installation of 1,000 CCTV units to deter crime |
| Environment | Ban on construction projects at hill slopes and at areas 250 ft (76 m) above sea level | Continued preservation of all forest reserves within Penang; Rehabilitation of the Jelutong landfill upon the cessation of operations; Execution of flood mitigation projects within Penang |
| Public infrastructure | Free parking lots for owners of affordable housing units | RM20 million refurbishment of the Penang State Museum and Art Gallery; Construction of sports infrastructure worth RM275 million, including an electronic games arena and a motorcycle race circuit; Construction of markets and community halls |
| Governance | - | A two-term limit for the position of the Chief Minister; Penang Public Accounts Committee chairman to be allocated to the leader of the state opposition |

=== Social media ===
The election was notable for the extensive use of social media, particularly by the opposing Pakatan Harapan (PH) and Barisan Nasional (BN) coalitions. Both sides created numerous videos to disseminate their policies, pledges and ideologies to the public in the run-up to the election.

Videos created by the PH typically depict the improvements experienced by Penangites since 2008, when the coalition's predecessor, the Pakatan Rakyat (PR), was voted into power. The PH-led state government's welfare policies, Penang's economic growth, the refurbishment of existing infrastructure, and efforts to improve cleanliness and reduce crime, as well as the preservation of forest reserves within the state, are often touted in these videos.

In contrast, BN's videos generated considerable controversy. On 22 February 2018, a video entitled "Penang, would you hear my story?" depicting a woman grousing about her disappointment with the general state of affairs in Penang under PH rule was uploaded online by a BN-linked Facebook page. It received widespread condemnation by netizens and PH politicians alike, and was generally seen as a BN propaganda effort designed to peddle half-truths and myths about Penang's PH-led government. An official of the state government, Zaidi Ahmad, rebutted all the allegations raised in the video, pointing out, among others, that Penangites' median income and average monthly income were greater than the national average, Penang's relatively low unemployment rate and water tariffs, and that the PH administration has indeed built more affordable housing units within the state. Meanwhile, on 23 April, Grace Teoh Koon Gee, a councillor of the Penang Island City Council, lodged a police report over a BN-made video which painted the PH as a racist party. RSN Rayer, a DAP politician, slammed the video as extremely dangerous and stated that the video was intended to "instigate voters to go against PH".

During the campaigning period, a number of DAP candidates fell victim to slanderous social media content created by BN. For instance, Ramasamy Palanisamy, the Deputy Chief Minister II of Penang and the incumbent State Assemblyman for Perai, lodged a police report on 2 May over a manipulated video of his speech during a rally in Perai, which was reportedly circulated by BN. DAP's candidate in Seri Delima, Syerleena Abdul Rashid, also lodged a police report over BN's baseless allegations that she supported the Christian domination of Penang. BN cybertroopers targeted Satees Muniandy, the DAP candidate in Bagan Dalam, as well, claiming that he owns a luxurious house worth RM527,000.

=== Rallies ===
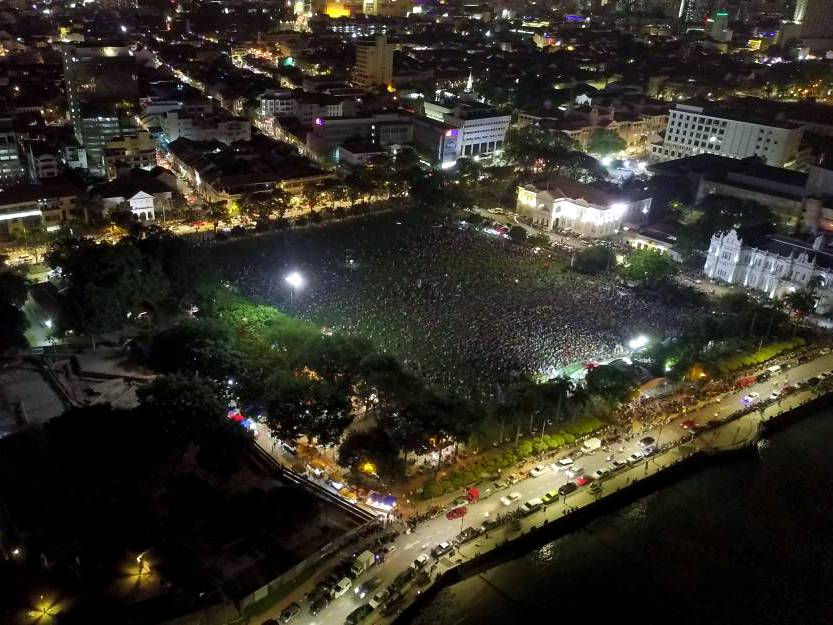
The Pakatan Harapan rally at the Esplanade in George Town on 28 April 2018.

Instead of holding large-scale rallies solely in Penang's capital city, George Town (on Penang Island), as was the practice in the 2008 and 2013 elections, the Pakatan Harapan (PH) organised simultaneous rallies in both George Town and mainland Seberang Perai. This change of tactic was intended to reach out to more voters, particularly in Seberang Perai, thus negating the need for supporters to travel across the Penang Strait to attend the rallies and reducing traffic congestion within George Town.

The first PH rallies were held concurrently on 28 April 2018 at George Town's Esplanade and Butterworth on the mainland; both rallies, which featured key speakers such as Lim Guan Eng, Nurul Izzah Anwar and Marina Mahathir, collectively attracted more than 120,000 people. Simultaneous PH rallies were also held on 2 May at George Town's Han Chiang College and Juru on the mainland, with the Han Chiang rally alone attended by a 120,000-strong crowd.

The last PH rallies were held at George Town's Esplanade on 7 and 8 May, the latter of which was held simultaneously with other PH rallies in Bayan Baru, Butterworth and Seberang Jaya. The PH rally at the Esplanade on 7 May collected RM84,335.70 worth of donations, with PH supporters staying on site despite the rain. Meanwhile, PH's last Esplanade rally on 8 May featured former United Malays National Organisation (UMNO) politician, Rafidah Aziz, as one of its key speakers, as well as the live telecast of a speech by Mahathir Mohamad, PH's candidate for the position of the Malaysian Prime Minister.

== Controversies ==
The decision by the Malaysian Election Commission to hold the election on a weekday (Wednesday, 9 May 2018), as opposed to the previous practice of holding elections on weekends, sparked considerable uproar on the Internet. Netizens voiced their displeasure and questioned the need to hold the polling day on a weekday, and alleged that this decision was intended to reduce voter turnout. In particular, voters residing outside Penang could be hampered from returning home for the polling day due to work commitments, thus carrying the potential of a lower voter turnout which would place the Pakatan Harapan (PH) at a disadvantage. In response to the nationwide criticism of the polling date, the then Malaysian Prime Minister, Najib Razak, subsequently declared 9 May as a national holiday.

During the polling day on 9 May, PH candidates, including Lim Guan Eng and Zairil Khir Johari, reported that their mobile phones and social media accounts were being subjected to cyber attacks. The candidates alleged that their mobile phones received a continuous stream of automatically generated spam calls from United States-based phone numbers by the minute, disrupting the coalition's communications and operations in the midst of polling.

== Election pendulum ==
The 14th General Election witnessed 37 governmental seats and 3 non-governmental seats filled the Penang State Legislative Assembly. The government side has 25 safe seats and 2 fairly safe seats. However, none of the non-government side has safe and fairly safe seat.

2018 Penang state election

GOVERNMENT SEATS
Marginal
| Pinang Tunggal | Ahmad Zakiyuddin Abd. Rahman | PKR | 38.76 |
| Bertam | Khaliq Mehtab Mohd. Ishaq | BERSATU | 41.20 |
| Sungai Acheh | Zulkifli Ibrahim | PKR | 44.19 |
| Telok Ayer Tawar | Mustafa Kamal Ahmad | PKR | 44.40 |
| Penanti | Dr. Norlela Ariffin | PKR | 44.95 |
| Permatang Pasir | Muhammad Faiz Mohamed Fadzil | AMANAH | 45.33 |
| Sungai Bakap | Amar Pritpal Abdullah | PKR | 45.56 |
| Telok Bahang | Zolkifly Md. Lazim | BERSATU | 45.65 |
| Pulau Betong | Mohd. Tuah Ismail | PKR | 49.63 |
| Seberang Jaya | Dr. Afif Bahardin | PKR | 53.12 |
Fairly safe
| Bayan Lepas | Azrul Mahathir Aziz | AMANAH | 56.17 |
| Batu Maung | Abdul Halim Hussain | PKR | 58.72 |
Safe
| Bukit Tengah | Gooi Hsiao-Leung | PKR | 66.16 |
| Sungai Pinang | Lim Siew Khim | DAP | 68.79 |
| Machang Bubok | Lee Khai Loon | PKR | 68.98 |
| Bagan Dalam | Satees Muniandy | DAP | 72.54 |
| Pantai Jerejak | Saifuddin Nasution Ismail | PKR | 73.45 |
| Datok Keramat | Jagdeep Singh Deo | DAP | 75.25 |
| Tanjong Bunga | Zairil Khir Johari | DAP | 76.37 |
| Jawi | H’ng Mooi Lye | DAP | 78.58 |
| Air Itam | Joseph Ng Soon Seong | DAP | 79.76 |
| Batu Uban | Kumaresan Aramugam | PKR | 80.43 |
| Bukit Tambun | Goh Choon Aik | PKR | 81.54 |
| Pulau Tikus | Chris Lee Chun Kit | DAP | 82.32 |
| Perai | Prof. Dr. Ramasamy Palanisamy | DAP | 82.46 |
| Seri Delima | Syerleena Abdul Rashid | DAP | 82.54 |
| Komtar | Teh Lai Heng | DAP | 84.64 |
| Bagan Jermal | Soon Lip Chee | DAP | 85.37 |
| Air Putih | Lim Guan Eng | DAP | 85.61 |
| Padang Kota | Chow Kon Yeow | DAP | 85.76 |
| Kebun Bunga | Jason Ong Khan Lee | PKR | 86.27 |
| Paya Terubong | Yeoh Soon Hin | DAP | 88.59 |
| Padang Lalang | Chong Eng | DAP | 88.66 |
| Pengkalan Kota | Gooi Zi Sen | DAP | 88.87 |
| Batu Lancang | Ong Ah Teong | DAP | 89.01 |
| Sungai Puyu | Phee Boon Poh | DAP | 90.17 |
| Berapit | Heng Lee Lee | DAP | 92.06 |

NON-GOVERNMENT SEATS
Marginal
| Permatang Berangan | Nor Hafizah Othman | UMNO | 37.87 |
| Sungai Dua | Muhammad Yusoff Mohd. Noor | UMNO | 41.07 |
| Penaga | Mohd. Yusni Mat Piah | PAS | 53.55 |

== Results ==
Maps of Penang election results map by percentage

Seats won
1. Pakatan Harapan (92.5%)
2. Barisan Nasional Barisan Nasional (5.00%)
3. Gagasan Sejahtera (2.50%)
Popular vote
1. Pakatan Harapan (67.2%)
2. Barisan Nasional Barisan Nasional (22.4%)
3. Gagasan Sejahtera (9.78%)
4. Parti Rakyat Malaysia (0.15%)
5. Penang Front Party (0.08%)
6. Socialist Party of Malaysia (0.03%)
7. Malaysian United Party (0.30%)
8. Independent (0.05%)

| Party or alliance | | Votes | % | Seats | +/– |
|---|---|---|---|---|---|
| Pakatan Harapan | Democratic Action Party | 301,343 | 38.21 | 19 | 0 |
| Pakatan Harapan | People's Justice Party | 184,350 | 23.37 | 14 | +4 |
| Pakatan Harapan | Malaysian United Indigenous Party | 16,988 | 2.15 | 2 | New |
| Pakatan Harapan | National Trust Party | 27,327 | 3.46 | 2 | New |
| Pakatan Harapan | Total | 530,008 | 67.20 | 37 | +8 |
| Barisan Nasional | United Malays National Organisation | 101,761 | 12.90 | 2 | –8 |
| Barisan Nasional | Parti Gerakan Rakyat Malaysia | 43,092 | 5.46 | 0 | 0 |
| Barisan Nasional | Malaysian Chinese Association | 25,758 | 3.27 | 0 | 0 |
| Barisan Nasional | Malaysian Indian Congress | 6,112 | 0.77 | 0 | 0 |
| Barisan Nasional | Total | 176,723 | 22.41 | 2 | –8 |
| Gagasan Sejahtera | Pan-Malaysian Islamic Party | 76,746 | 9.73 | 1 | 0 |
| Gagasan Sejahtera | People's Alternative Party | 342 | 0.04 | 0 | 0 |
| Gagasan Sejahtera | Love Malaysia Party | 83 | 0.01 | 0 | 0 |
| Gagasan Sejahtera | Total | 77,171 | 9.78 | 1 | 0 |
| Malaysian United Party | | 2,366 | 0.30 | 0 | 0 |
| Parti Rakyat Malaysia | | 1,190 | 0.15 | 0 | 0 |
| Penang Front Party | | 631 | 0.08 | 0 | 0 |
| Socialist Party of Malaysia | | 223 | 0.03 | 0 | 0 |
| Independents | | 375 | 0.05 | 0 | 0 |
| Total | | 788,687 | 100.00 | 40 | 0 |
| Valid votes | | 788,687 | 98.57 | | |
| Invalid/blank votes | | 11,471 | 1.43 | | |
| Total votes | | 800,158 | 100.00 | | |
| Registered voters/turnout | | 945,627 | 84.62 | | |
Source: The Star

An animated electoral map of Penang, depicting the state constituencies gained by the Pakatan Harapan (PH) in the 2018 Election. Pakatan Harapan DAP-controlled seats PKR-controlled seats Bersatu-controlled seats Amanah-controlled seats Barisan Nasional UMNO-controlled seats Gagasan Sejahtera PAS-controlled seats

The Pakatan Harapan (PH) coalition scored its best ever electoral results in Penang's history, seizing eight additional seats to increase its tally in the Penang State Legislative Assembly to 37, or 92.5% of the legislature. The election marked the debut of PH's newest component parties - the Malaysian United Indigenous Party (Bersatu) and the National Trust Party (Amanah) - into Penang's political arena, with each of the parties winning two constituencies. The People's Justice Party (PKR) also successfully increased its share in the legislature from 10 seats to 14 seats. Meanwhile, the Democratic Action Party (DAP) saw an increase in the majority in some of its 19 seats. The incumbent Chief Minister of Penang, Lim Guan Eng, defended the Air Putih constituency with over 80% of the popular vote, while Chow Kon Yeow won in Padang Kota with more than 70% of the popular vote. The largest margin of victory was recorded in Paya Terubong, where Yeoh Soon Hin of the DAP won by 31,189 votes.

The election also saw BN's worst performance in Penang's history, as the coalition lost eight constituencies to the PH and retained only two, both of which are won by the United Malays National Organisation (UMNO). Once again, BN's other component parties, namely Parti Gerakan Rakyat Malaysia (Gerakan), the Malaysian Chinese Association (MCA) and the Malaysian Indian Congress (MIC), did not win any seat. Although the Malaysian Islamic Party (PAS) lost the Permatang Pasir constituency, it managed to capture the Penaga constituency from the BN, thus giving the Islamist party a single seat in the Penang State Legislative Assembly.

PH 37 | BN 2 | GS 1 | Independent 0
| Constituency | Winner | Party | Votes | Opponent(s) | Party | Votes | Majority | Incumbent |
| Penaga | Mohd Yusni Mat Piah | PAS | 8,530 | Mohd Zain Ahmad | UMNO | 7,398 | 1,132 | Mohd Zain Ahmad (UMNO) |
| Bertam | Khaliq Mehtab Mohd Ishaq | Bersatu | 6,485 | Shariful Azhar Othman | UMNO | 6,268 | 217 | Shariful Azhar Othman (UMNO) |
| Bertam | Khaliq Mehtab Mohd Ishaq | Bersatu | 6,485 | Moktar Ramly | PAS | 2,986 | 217 | Shariful Azhar Othman (UMNO) |
| Pinang Tunggal | Ahmad Zakiyuddin Abdul Rahman | PKR | 7,754 | Roslan Saidin | UMNO | 7,627 | 127 | Roslan Saidin (UMNO) |
| Pinang Tunggal | Ahmad Zakiyuddin Abdul Rahman | PKR | 7,754 | Bukhori Ghazali | PAS | 4,622 | 127 | Roslan Saidin (UMNO) |
| Permatang Berangan | Nor Hafizah Othman | UMNO | 6,870 | Mohd Shariff Omar | Bersatu | 5,021 | 646 | Omar Haji Abd Hamid (UMNO) |
| Permatang Berangan | Nor Hafizah Othman | UMNO | 6,870 | Mohd Sobri Saleh | PAS | 6,224 | 646 | Omar Haji Abd Hamid (UMNO) |
| Permatang Berangan | Nor Hafizah Othman | UMNO | 6,870 | Azman Shah Othman | PRM | 24 | 646 | Omar Haji Abd Hamid (UMNO) |
| Sungai Dua | Muhamad Yusoff Mohd Noor | UMNO | 7,314 | Yusri Isahak | Amanah | 5,115 | 1,934 | Muhamad Yusoff Mohd Noor (UMNO) |
| Sungai Dua | Muhamad Yusoff Mohd Noor | UMNO | 7,314 | Zahadi Hj. Mohd | PAS | 5,380 | 1,934 | Muhamad Yusoff Mohd Noor (UMNO) |
| Telok Ayer Tawar | Mustafa Kamal Ahmad | PKR | 7,072 | Zamri Che Ros | UMNO | 4,869 | 2,203 | Jahara Hamid (UMNO) |
| Telok Ayer Tawar | Mustafa Kamal Ahmad | PKR | 7,072 | Mohamad Hanif Haron | PAS | 3,900 | 2,203 | Jahara Hamid (UMNO) |
| Telok Ayer Tawar | Mustafa Kamal Ahmad | PKR | 7,072 | Lee Thian Hong | PRM | 88 | 2,203 | Jahara Hamid (UMNO) |
| Sungai Puyu | Phee Boon Poh | DAP | 21,705 | Lim Hai Song | MCA | 2,136 | 19,569 | Phee Boon Poh (DAP) |
| Sungai Puyu | Phee Boon Poh | DAP | 21,705 | Tan Lay Hock | PRM | 101 | 19,569 | Phee Boon Poh (DAP) |
| Sungai Puyu | Phee Boon Poh | DAP | 21,705 | Ong Yin Yin | PFP | 51 | 19,569 | Phee Boon Poh (DAP) |
| Sungai Puyu | Phee Boon Poh | DAP | 21,705 | Neoh Bok Keng | MUP | 79 | 19,569 | Phee Boon Poh (DAP) |
| Bagan Jermal | Soon Lip Chee | DAP | 18,134 | Ang Chor Keong | MCA | 2,898 | 15,236 | Lim Hock Seng (DAP) |
| Bagan Jermal | Soon Lip Chee | DAP | 18,134 | Teoh Chai Deng | PRM | 74 | 15,236 | Lim Hock Seng (DAP) |
| Bagan Jermal | Soon Lip Chee | DAP | 18,134 | Fabian George Albart | PFP | 30 | 15,236 | Lim Hock Seng (DAP) |
| Bagan Jermal | Soon Lip Chee | DAP | 18,134 | Hari Devydrai | MUP | 106 | 15,236 | Lim Hock Seng (DAP) |
| Bagan Dalam | Satees Muniandy | DAP | 10,701 | Dhinagaran Jayabalan | MIC | 3,918 | 6,783 | Tanasekharan Autherapady (DAP) |
| Bagan Dalam | Satees Muniandy | DAP | 10,701 | Teoh Huck Ping | PRM | 45 | 6,783 | Tanasekharan Autherapady (DAP) |
| Bagan Dalam | Satees Muniandy | DAP | 10,701 | Jasper Ooi Zong Han | PFP | 36 | 6,783 | Tanasekharan Autherapady (DAP) |
| Bagan Dalam | Satees Muniandy | DAP | 10,701 | Teoh Uat Lye | MUP | 51 | 6,783 | Tanasekharan Autherapady (DAP) |
| Seberang Jaya | Afif Bahardin | PKR | 16,014 | Abu Bakar Sidekh Zainul Abidin | UMNO | 8,593 | 7,421 | Afif Bahardin (PKR) |
| Seberang Jaya | Afif Bahardin | PKR | 16,014 | Ahmad Rafaei Rashid | PAS | 5,540 | 7,421 | Afif Bahardin (PKR) |
| Permatang Pasir | Faiz Fadzil | Amanah | 9,708 | Anuar Faisal Yahaya | UMNO | 4,979 | 2,981 | Mohd Salleh Man (PAS) |
| Permatang Pasir | Faiz Fadzil | Amanah | 9,708 | Muhammad Fauzi Yusoff | PAS | 6,727 | 2,981 | Mohd Salleh Man (PAS) |
| Penanti | Norlela Ariffin | PKR | 8,221 | Suhaimi Sabudin | UMNO | 5,277 | 2,944 | Norlela Ariffin (PKR) |
| Penanti | Norlela Ariffin | PKR | 8,221 | Fawwaz Mohamad Jan | PAS | 4,791 | 2,944 | Norlela Ariffin (PKR) |
| Berapit | Heng Lee Lee | DAP | 18,378 | Goh Swee Gim | MCA | 1,397 | 16,981 | Ong Kok Fooi (DAP) |
| Berapit | Heng Lee Lee | DAP | 18,378 | Song Chee Meng | PRM | 84 | 16,981 | Ong Kok Fooi (DAP) |
| Berapit | Heng Lee Lee | DAP | 18,378 | Lee Poh Kong | PFP | 105 | 16,981 | Ong Kok Fooi (DAP) |
| Machang Bubuk | Lee Khai Loon | PKR | 21,819 | Tan Teik Cheng | MCA | 4,658 | 16,747 | Lee Khai Loon (PKR) |
| Machang Bubuk | Lee Khai Loon | PKR | 21,819 | Jamil Abdul Rahman | PAS | 5,072 | 16,747 | Lee Khai Loon (PKR) |
| Machang Bubuk | Lee Khai Loon | PKR | 21,819 | Tang Ah Ba | PRM | 53 | 16,747 | Lee Khai Loon (PKR) |
| Machang Bubuk | Lee Khai Loon | PKR | 21,819 | Lim Jhun Hou | MUP | 28 | 16,747 | Lee Khai Loon (PKR) |
| Padang Lalang | Chong Eng | DAP | 20,764 | Kuan Hin Yeep | Gerakan | 2,400 | 18,364 | Chong Eng (DAP) |
| Padang Lalang | Chong Eng | DAP | 20,764 | Lai Yean Nee | PRM | 154 | 18,364 | Chong Eng (DAP) |
| Padang Lalang | Chong Eng | DAP | 20,764 | Liew Ee Jin | PFP | 101 | 18,364 | Chong Eng (DAP) |
| Perai | Ramasamy Palanisamy | DAP | 11,243 | Suresh Muniandy | MIC | 2,194 | 9,049 | Ramasamy Palanisamy (DAP) |
| Perai | Ramasamy Palanisamy | DAP | 11,243 | Asoghan Govindaraju | PAP | 33 | 9,049 | Ramasamy Palanisamy (DAP) |
| Perai | Ramasamy Palanisamy | DAP | 11,243 | Samuganathan Muniandy | PRM | 37 | 9,049 | Ramasamy Palanisamy (DAP) |
| Perai | Ramasamy Palanisamy | DAP | 11,243 | Patrick Ooi Khar Giap | PFP | 104 | 9,049 | Ramasamy Palanisamy (DAP) |
| Perai | Ramasamy Palanisamy | DAP | 11,243 | Isumary Retnam | - | 23 | 9,049 | Ramasamy Palanisamy (DAP) |
| Bukit Tengah | Gooi Hsiao-Leung | PKR | 12,535 | Thor Teong Gee | Gerakan | 3,977 | 8,558 | Ong Chin Wen (PKR) |
| Bukit Tengah | Gooi Hsiao-Leung | PKR | 12,535 | Norazman Ishak | PAS | 2,355 | 8,558 | Ong Chin Wen (PKR) |
| Bukit Tengah | Gooi Hsiao-Leung | PKR | 12,535 | Tan Hiang Lye | PRM | 53 | 8,558 | Ong Chin Wen (PKR) |
| Bukit Tengah | Gooi Hsiao-Leung | PKR | 12,535 | Joseph Edward | PFP | 27 | 8,558 | Ong Chin Wen (PKR) |
| Bukit Tambun | Goh Choon Aik | PKR | 18,064 | Hartini Tan Abdullah | Gerakan | 3,184 | 14,880 | Law Choo Kiang (PKR) |
| Bukit Tambun | Goh Choon Aik | PKR | 18,064 | Kumaravelu Arumugam | PAS | 735 | 14,880 | Law Choo Kiang (PKR) |
| Bukit Tambun | Goh Choon Aik | PKR | 18,064 | Goh Bee Koon | PRM | 117 | 14,880 | Law Choo Kiang (PKR) |
| Bukit Tambun | Goh Choon Aik | PKR | 18,064 | Ong Seong Lu | PFP | 54 | 14,880 | Law Choo Kiang (PKR) |
| Jawi | H’ng Mooi Lye | DAP | 17,559 | Kiew Hen Chong | MCA | 4,188 | 13,371 | Soon Lip Chee (DAP) |
| Jawi | H’ng Mooi Lye | DAP | 17,559 | Tan Beng Huat | PAP | 309 | 13,371 | Soon Lip Chee (DAP) |
| Jawi | H’ng Mooi Lye | DAP | 17,559 | Tan Chew Suan | PRM | 51 | 13,371 | Soon Lip Chee (DAP) |
| Jawi | H’ng Mooi Lye | DAP | 17,559 | Daphne Edward | PFP | 73 | 13,371 | Soon Lip Chee (DAP) |
| Jawi | H’ng Mooi Lye | DAP | 17,559 | Koay Xing Boon | MUP | 165 | 13,371 | Soon Lip Chee (DAP) |
| Sungai Bakap | Amar Pritpal Abdullah | PKR | 10,386 | Mohamed Sani Bakar | UMNO | 8,038 | 2,348 | Maktar Shapee (PKR) |
| Sungai Bakap | Amar Pritpal Abdullah | PKR | 10,386 | Osman Jaafar | PAS | 4,316 | 2,348 | Maktar Shapee (PKR) |
| Sungai Bakap | Amar Pritpal Abdullah | PKR | 10,386 | Tan Chow Kang | PRM | 55 | 2,348 | Maktar Shapee (PKR) |
| Sungai Acheh | Zulkifli Ibrahim | PKR | 7,486 | Mahmud Zakaria | UMNO | 7,070 | 416 | Mahmud Zakaria (UMNO) |
| Sungai Acheh | Zulkifli Ibrahim | PKR | 7,486 | Nor Zamri Latiff | PAS | 2,383 | 416 | Mahmud Zakaria (UMNO) |
| Tanjong Bunga | Zairil Khir Johari | DAP | 13,245 | Teng Chang Yeow | Gerakan | 3,902 | 9,343 | Teh Yee Cheu (DAP) |
| Tanjong Bunga | Zairil Khir Johari | DAP | 13,245 | Chua Cheong Wee | PRM | 122 | 9,343 | Teh Yee Cheu (DAP) |
| Tanjong Bunga | Zairil Khir Johari | DAP | 13,245 | Lee Zheng Yong | MUP | 74 | 9,343 | Teh Yee Cheu (DAP) |
| Air Putih | Lim Guan Eng | DAP | 9,362 | Tang Heap Seng | MCA | 1,404 | 7,958 | Lim Guan Eng (DAP) |
| Air Putih | Lim Guan Eng | DAP | 9,362 | Manikandan Ramayah | PCM | 83 | 7,958 | Lim Guan Eng (DAP) |
| Air Putih | Lim Guan Eng | DAP | 9,362 | Tan Gim Theam | MUP | 87 | 7,958 | Lim Guan Eng (DAP) |
| Kebun Bunga | Ong Khan Lee | PKR | 14,851 | Ooi Zhi Yi | Gerakan | 2,254 | 12,597 | Cheah Kah Peng (PKR) |
| Kebun Bunga | Ong Khan Lee | PKR | 14,851 | Wu Kai Min | MUP | 110 | 12,597 | Cheah Kah Peng (PKR) |
| Pulau Tikus | Chris Lee Chun Kit | DAP | 11,679 | Loo Jieh Sheng | Gerakan | 2,434 | 9,245 | Yap Soo Huey (DAP) |
| Pulau Tikus | Chris Lee Chun Kit | DAP | 11,679 | Wee Kean Wai | MUP | 75 | 9,245 | Yap Soo Huey (DAP) |
| Padang Kota | Chow Kon Yeow | DAP | 9,278 | H'ng Khoon Leng | Gerakan | 1,470 | 7,808 | Chow Kon Yeow (DAP) |
| Padang Kota | Chow Kon Yeow | DAP | 9,278 | Goh Saik Wei | MUP | 71 | 7,808 | Chow Kon Yeow (DAP) |
| Pengkalan Kota | Gooi Zi Sen | DAP | 15,037 | Lim Swee Bok | MCA | 1,647 | 13,390 | Lau Keng Ee (DAP) |
| Pengkalan Kota | Gooi Zi Sen | DAP | 15,037 | Chew Seng Tung | PRM | 68 | 13,390 | Lau Keng Ee (DAP) |
| Pengkalan Kota | Gooi Zi Sen | DAP | 15,037 | Koay Teng Lye | MUP | 82 | 13,390 | Lau Keng Ee (DAP) |
| Pengkalan Kota | Gooi Zi Sen | DAP | 15,037 | Ragindran Sivasamy | - | 87 | 13,390 | Lau Keng Ee (DAP) |
| Komtar | Teh Lai Heng | DAP | 10,113 | Tan Hing Teik | MCA | 1,750 | 8,363 | Teh Lai Heng (DAP) |
| Komtar | Teh Lai Heng | DAP | 10,113 | Ong Chun Jiet | MUP | 85 | 8,363 | Teh Lai Heng (DAP) |
| Datok Keramat | Jagdeep Singh Deo | DAP | 13,712 | Lee Boon Ten | Gerakan | 4,151 | 9,561 | Jagdeep Singh Deo (DAP) |
| Datok Keramat | Jagdeep Singh Deo | DAP | 13,712 | Nicholas Diane Morgan | PFP | 18 | 9,561 | Jagdeep Singh Deo (DAP) |
| Datok Keramat | Jagdeep Singh Deo | DAP | 13,712 | Lim Boo Chang | MUP | 194 | 9,561 | Jagdeep Singh Deo (DAP) |
| Datok Keramat | Jagdeep Singh Deo | DAP | 13,712 | Muhammad Majnun Abdul Wahab | - | 146 | 9,561 | Jagdeep Singh Deo (DAP) |
| Sungai Pinang | Lim Siew Khim | DAP | 15,362 | Ng Fook On | Gerakan | 4,974 | 10,388 | Lim Siew Khim (DAP) |
| Sungai Pinang | Lim Siew Khim | DAP | 15,362 | Yacoob Omar | PAS | 1,575 | 10,388 | Lim Siew Khim (DAP) |
| Sungai Pinang | Lim Siew Khim | DAP | 15,362 | Teh Yee Cheu | PSM | 223 | 10,388 | Lim Siew Khim (DAP) |
| Sungai Pinang | Lim Siew Khim | DAP | 15,362 | Tan Sim Bee | MUP | 79 | 10,388 | Lim Siew Khim (DAP) |
| Sungai Pinang | Lim Siew Khim | DAP | 15,362 | Mohamed Yacoob Mohamed Noor | - | 119 | 10,388 | Lim Siew Khim (DAP) |
| Batu Lancang | Ong Ah Teong | DAP | 20,615 | Koo Pei Chee | Gerakan | 2,407 | 18,208 | Law Heng Kiang (DAP) |
| Batu Lancang | Ong Ah Teong | DAP | 20,615 | Kee Lean Ee | MUP | 139 | 18,208 | Law Heng Kiang (DAP) |
| Seri Delima | Syerleena Abdul Rashid | DAP | 16,553 | Khoo Kay Teong | MCA | 3,342 | 13,211 | RSN Rayer (DAP) |
| Seri Delima | Syerleena Abdul Rashid | DAP | 16,553 | Tan Yang Yung | MUP | 159 | 13,211 | RSN Rayer (DAP) |
| Air Itam | Joseph Ng Soon Seong | DAP | 12,588 | Tan Kah Leong | Gerakan | 3,047 | 9,541 | Wong Hon Wai (DAP) |
| Air Itam | Joseph Ng Soon Seong | DAP | 12,588 | Kang Teik Woi | MUP | 148 | 9,541 | Wong Hon Wai (DAP) |
| Paya Terubong | Yeoh Soon Hin | DAP | 35,315 | Wong Chin Chong | MCA | 4,126 | 31,189 | Yeoh Soon Hin (DAP) |
| Paya Terubong | Yeoh Soon Hin | DAP | 35,315 | Kuan Aun Wan | MUP | 421 | 31,189 | Yeoh Soon Hin (DAP) |
| Batu Uban | Kumaresan Aramugam | PKR | 21,079 | Hng Chee Wey | Gerakan | 3,806 | 17,273 | Jayabalan Thambyappa (PKR) |
| Batu Uban | Kumaresan Aramugam | PKR | 21,079 | Vikneswaran Muniandy | PAS | 1,176 | 17,273 | Jayabalan Thambyappa (PKR) |
| Batu Uban | Kumaresan Aramugam | PKR | 21,079 | Teoh Kean Liang | PFP | 32 | 17,273 | Jayabalan Thambyappa (PKR) |
| Batu Uban | Kumaresan Aramugam | PKR | 21,079 | Teoh Kok Siang | MUP | 116 | 17,273 | Jayabalan Thambyappa (PKR) |
| Pantai Jerejak | Saifuddin Nasution Ismail | PKR | 14,014 | Oh Tong Keong | Gerakan | 3,298 | 10,716 | Mohd Rashid Hasnon (PKR) |
| Pantai Jerejak | Saifuddin Nasution Ismail | PKR | 14,014 | Mohd Farhan Yusri | PAS | 1,670 | 10,716 | Mohd Rashid Hasnon (PKR) |
| Pantai Jerejak | Saifuddin Nasution Ismail | PKR | 14,014 | Yim Boon Leong | MUP | 97 | 10,716 | Mohd Rashid Hasnon (PKR) |
| Batu Maung | Abdul Halim Hussain | PKR | 17,380 | Liakat Ali Mohamed Ali | UMNO | 9,063 | 8,317 | Abdul Malik Abdul Kassim (PKR) |
| Batu Maung | Abdul Halim Hussain | PKR | 17,380 | Saiful Lizan Md Yusuf | PAS | 3,153 | 8,317 | Abdul Malik Abdul Kassim (PKR) |
| Bayan Lepas | Azrul Mahathir Aziz | Amanah | 12,504 | Rusli Hashim | UMNO | 7,259 | 5,245 | Nordin Ahmad (UMNO) |
| Bayan Lepas | Azrul Mahathir Aziz | Amanah | 12,504 | Zarina Shinta Madar | PAS | 2,497 | 5,245 | Nordin Ahmad (UMNO) |
| Pulau Betong | Mohd Tuah Ismail | PKR | 7,675 | Muhamad Farid Saad | UMNO | 6,079 | 1,596 | Muhammad Farid Saad (UMNO) |
| Pulau Betong | Mohd Tuah Ismail | PKR | 7,675 | Muhd Taufik Hashim | PAS | 1,645 | 1,596 | Muhammad Farid Saad (UMNO) |
| Pulau Betong | Mohd Tuah Ismail | PKR | 7,675 | Yeoh Cheng Huat | PRM | 64 | 1,596 | Muhammad Farid Saad (UMNO) |
| Telok Bahang | Zolkifly Md Lazim | Bersatu | 5,482 | Shah Haedan Ayoob Hussain Shah | UMNO | 5,057 | 425 | Shah Haedan Ayoob Hussain Shah (UMNO) |
| Telok Bahang | Zolkifly Md Lazim | Bersatu | 5,482 | Mohd Ali Othman | PAS | 1,469 | 425 | Shah Haedan Ayoob Hussain Shah (UMNO) |

=== Seats that changed allegiance ===
| No. | Seat | Previous Party (2013) | Current Party (2018) |
|---|---|---|---|
| N01 | (Penang) Penaga | Barisan Nasional (UMNO) | Gagasan Sejahtera (PAS) |
| N02 | (Penang) Bertam | Barisan Nasional (UMNO) | Pakatan Harapan (BERSATU) |
| N03 | (Penang) Pinang Tunggal | Barisan Nasional (UMNO) | Pakatan Harapan (PKR) |
| N06 | (Penang) Telok Ayer Tawar | Barisan Nasional (UMNO) | Pakatan Harapan (PKR) |
| N11 | (Penang) Permatang Pasir | Gagasan Sejahtera (PAS) | Pakatan Harapan (AMANAH) |
| N21 | (Penang) Sungai Acheh | Barisan Nasional (UMNO) | Pakatan Harapan (PKR) |
| N38 | (Penang) Bayan Lepas | Barisan Nasional (UMNO) | Pakatan Harapan (AMANAH) |
| N39 | (Penang) Pulau Betong | Barisan Nasional (UMNO) | Pakatan Harapan (PKR) |
| N40 | (Penang) Telok Bahang | Barisan Nasional (UMNO) | Pakatan Harapan (BERSATU) |

== Aftermath ==
The 14th Malaysian general election, which was held simultaneously with the Penang state election, resulted in the Pakatan Harapan (PH) coalition seizing power at the federal level from the incumbent Barisan Nasional (BN), making the election the first time since independence Malaysia experienced a regime change. On 12 May 2018, the incumbent Chief Minister of Penang, Lim Guan Eng, was appointed the Finance Minister by the new Malaysian Prime Minister, Mahathir Mohamad. Chow Kon Yeow, the chairperson of the Democratic Action Party in Penang, had been endorsed by Lim to succeed the latter as the Chief Minister; Chow was sworn in as Penang's fifth Chief Minister on 14 May.

Meanwhile, Barisan Nasional's Penang chief, Teng Chang Yeow, announced his retirement from politics in the aftermath of the coalition's rout in the hands of the PH. Aside from the PH administration's exemplary performance in Penang in the preceding 10 years, the trouncing of the BN was also attributed to the Malaysia-wide tsunami against the perceived corruption and maladministration by the previous BN-led federal government. Teng's counterpart in the United Malays National Organisation (UMNO), Zainal Abidin Osman, also tendered his resignation as the Penang chief of the BN component party.

On 23 June, Teng's former party Gerakan, through the decision of its central committee, announced its exit from Barisan Nasional.

== See also ==
- Constituencies of Penang
- Elections in Penang
