= Youth Front Party =

- Chinese name: 青年黨 青年党
- Abbreviation: PFP
- President: Razalif Mohd Zain
- Advisor: Patrick Ooi Kar Giap 黄家业
- Secretary General: Lee Poh Kong 李宝光
- Founders: Zahidi Zainul Abidin
- Founded: 6 September 2016
- Headquarters: Perai
- Youth wing: Vacant
- Ideology: Regionalism
- Colours: Red, Blue, Yellow
- Slogan: "Penang for Penangites" 槟城人的槟城 (Penang for Penang Lang)
- Dewan Negara: 0 / 70
- Dewan Rakyat: 0 / 222
- Dewan Undangan Negeri: 0 / 587

Party flag

Website
- Youth Front Party on Facebook

Youth Front Party (Formerly Penang Front Party, PFP) is a Penang-based-opposition party in Malaysia. The party was originally founded in 2016 with Zahidi Zainul Abidin, the UMNO lawmaker as an advisor, and revived a few months later by Patrick Ooi. It contested several seats in the then-opposition held state of Penang during the 2018 Malaysian general election but also sent a candidate to Kuala Lumpur. However, they failed in their maiden electoral venture with all their candidates having lost their deposits.

In June 2022, Party Chairman announced that PFP eyed to contest 10 state and parliamentary seats in Penang, and Kedah in the 15th General Election (GE15). However, according to records from Election Commission Of Malaysia, PFP did not contest in the 2022 general election. Razalif Mohd Zain contested for the Bukit Bendera federal seat as an independent instead of representing the party in the election. He lost the election to Syerleena Abdul Rashid of Pakatan Harapan (PH) and Democratic Action Party (DAP) by a minority of 49,054 votes, garnering only 299 votes, which is 0.48% of the total votes.

In Oct 2022 it was reported by a local news agency indicate that police arrested an ex-politician to assist in investigation and probe related to anti-human trafficking.

On 17 December 2022, the local news agency reported that party president Patrick Ooi Khar Giap had been charged under the Anti-Trafficking in Persons and Smuggling of Migrants Act, which carries a maximum 20 years' jail and fine, upon conviction.

On 22 December 2022, Ooi resigned as party president and handed over the presidency to 32-year-old businessman Razalif Mohd Zain. Ooi then became the party advisor. He also brushed off the allegations that his resignation was linked to his recent court case and clarified that he had already planned to do so earlier and started discussions with incoming president Razalif in September 2022 on the matter of rebranding the party, which is before he was taken legal action in October 2022. Ooi also highlighted that the past 6 years when he served as party president from 2016 to 2022 he had found the lack of space of breakthrough and his belief on Razalif that the latter was able to attract more youngsters to join the party that had led to his resignation as party president. Razalif also added that Ooi would carry on joining the efforts of rebranding the party. He also raised several strategies on the efforts ranging from renaming the party, changing the party logo and attracting the youngsters from 18 to 30 years old. In addition, he welcomed those low-income youngsters and would strive to improve their economic conditions and mulled to provide discount cards for party members that would benefit them by costing them less in shops. He claimed that thousands intended to join the party across the nation and expressed his hope of raising the number of party members from 5,000 to 100,000. He would also assemble 10,000 youngsters at Bukit Jalil National Stadium to rally in support of Prime Minister Anwar Ibrahim but stressed that the party was not joining any political coalitions. Razali also rubbished questions on his qualifications about his past court cases and noted that they had been closed.

== Election results ==
=== General elections ===
Election	Leader	Seats contested	Votes	%	Seats won	Status
2018	Patrick Ooi Kar Giap	2	892	0.00%	0 / 222	Extraparliamentary
2022	Patrick Ooi Kar Giap	1 (as Independent)	299	0.00%	0 / 222	Extraparliamentary

=== State elections ===
Penang State Legislative Assembly
Election	Votes		Seats			Position	Status
Election	Count	%	Result	Won / contested	+/–	Position	Status
2018	631	0.1	0 / 40	0 / 11	Steady	6th	No seats
2023	333	0.0	0 / 40	0 / 2	Steady	6th	No seats

== See also ==
- Politics of Malaysia
- List of political parties in Malaysia
