= Tanjong Bunga =

State constituency in Penang, Malaysia

Tanjong Bunga (N22)
Penang constituency
- Tanjong Bunga (olive) on Penang

State constituency
- Legislature: Penang State Legislative Assembly
MLA
Zairil Khir Johari
PH
- Constituency created: 1959 (as Tanjong Bungah)
- First contested: 1959
- Last contested: 2023

Demographics
- Electors (2023): 29,477
- Area (km²): 19

Tanjong Bunga is a state constituency in Penang, Malaysia, that has been represented in the Penang State Legislative Assembly since 1959. It covers the suburbs of George Town along the northern coast of Penang Island, including Batu Ferringhi, Tanjung Bungah and parts of Tanjung Tokong.

The state constituency was first contested in 1959 and is mandated to return a single Assemblyman to the Penang State Legislative Assembly under the first-past-the-post voting system. Since 2018, the State Assemblyman for Tanjong Bunga is Zairil Khir Johari from the Democratic Action Party (DAP), which is part of the state's ruling coalition, Pakatan Harapan (PH).

== Definition ==
=== Polling districts ===
According to the federal gazette issued on 30 March 2018, the Tanjong Bunga constituency is divided into 7 polling districts.

State constituency	Polling districts	Code	Location
Tanjong Bunga (N22)	Batu Feringgi	048/22/01	SJK (C) Pai Chai
Tanjong Bunga (N22)	Jalan Vale Of Tempe	048/22/02	SK Tanjung Bunga
Tanjong Bunga (N22)	Kampong Tanjong Bunga	048/22/03	SMK Pendidikan Khas Persekutuan (P) Jalan Lembah Permai
Tanjong Bunga (N22)	Seaview Park	048/22/04	SMK Tanjong Bunga
Tanjong Bunga (N22)	Jalan Gajah	048/22/05	SJK (C) Hun Bin
Tanjong Bunga (N22)	Tanjong Tokong	048/22/06	SK Tanjong Tokong
Tanjong Bunga (N22)	Sungai Kelian	048/22/07	SJK (C) Poay Wah

Thus, the northernmost suburbs of George Town - Batu Ferringhi, Tanjung Bungah and the northern part of Tanjung Tokong (up to Jalan Gajah and Tanjung Tokong Road) - fall under this state seat. It also encompasses the newly created neighbourhood of Seri Tanjung Pinang at Tanjung Tokong, which was reclaimed from the sea in the early 2000s.

== Demographics ==
Ethnic breakdown of Tanjong Bunga's electorate as of 2023
1. Chinese (59.5%)
2. Malay (25.9%)
3. Indian (12.1%)
4. Other ethnicities (2.55%)

Total electors by polling district in 2016
Polling district	Electors
Batu Ferringhi	3,855
Jalan Gajah	2,185
Kampong Tanjong Bunga	2,506
Seaview Park	4,095
Sungai Kelian	1,233
Tanjung Tokong	3,593
Vale of Tempe	2,659
Total	20,126
Source: Malaysian Election Commission

== History ==
The Tanjong Bunga state constituency was originally named Tanjong Bungah when it was created prior to the 1959 State Election. It was then renamed in time for the 1974 State Election.

Tanjong Bungah was one of the first state seats in Penang to be captured by the then fledgling DAP in 1969.

Koh Tsu Koon, a Gerakan politician, first won the Tanjong Bunga constituency in 1990 and was subsequently appointed as the Chief Minister of Penang. Koh held the seat until 2008, when he announced his intention to step down from his position as the Chief Minister.

During the State Election later that year, the constituency was wrested from the Barisan Nasional (BN) federal ruling coalition by Teh Yee Cheu, then a DAP politician. Teh held Tanjong Bunga until the 2018 State Election, when DAP's Zairil Khir Johari, who was selected to replace the former, won the constituency.

=== Representation history ===
Penang State Legislative Assemblyman for Tanjong Bunga
Assembly	No	Years	Member	Party
Constituency created
Tanjong Bungah
1st	N10	1959 – 1964	Cheah Seng Khim (谢成金)	Alliance (MCA)
2nd	N10	1964 – 1969	Cheah Seng Khim (谢成金)	Alliance (MCA)
		1969- 1971	Assembly was dissolved	
3rd	N10	1971 – 1974	Khoo Soo Giap (邱思业)	DAP
Tanjong Bunga
4th	N19	1974 – 1978	Khor Gark Kim (许岳金)	BN (GERAKAN)
5th	N19	1978 – 1982	Khor Gark Kim (许岳金)	BN (GERAKAN)
6th	N19	1982 – 1986	Khor Gark Kim (许岳金)	BN (GERAKAN)
7th	N19	1986 – 1990	Khoo Boo Yeang (邱武扬)	BN (GERAKAN)
8th	N19	1990 – 1995	Koh Tsu Koon (许子根)	BN (GERAKAN)
9th	N19	1995 – 1999	Koh Tsu Koon (许子根)	BN (GERAKAN)
10th	N19	1999 – 2004	Koh Tsu Koon (许子根)	BN (GERAKAN)
11th	N22	2004 – 2008	Koh Tsu Koon (许子根)	BN (GERAKAN)
12th	N22	2008 – 2013	Teh Yee Cheu (鄭雨周)	PR (DAP)
13th	N22	2013 – 2015	Teh Yee Cheu (鄭雨周)	PR (DAP)
13th	N22	2015 – 2018	Teh Yee Cheu (鄭雨周)	PH (DAP)
14th	N22	2018 – 2023	Zairil Khir Johari	PH (DAP)
15th	N22	2023–present	Zairil Khir Johari	PH (DAP)

== Election results ==
The electoral results for the Tanjong Bunga state constituency are as follows.

Penang state election, 2023: Tanjong Bunga
Party	Candidate	Votes	%	∆%
PH	Zairil Khir Johari	13,257	72.82	▼3.55
PN	Hng Chee Wey	4,430	24.33	▲24.33
Parti Rakyat Malaysia	Lee Chui Wah	518	2.85	▲2.15
Total valid votes		18,205	100.00	
Total rejected ballots		126		
Unreturned ballots		59		
Turnout		18,390	62.39	▼18.33
Registered electors		29,477		
Majority		8,827	48.49	▼5.38
PH hold		Swing		

Penang state election, 2018: Tanjong Bunga
Party	Candidate	Votes	%	∆%
PKR	Zairil Khir Johari	13,245	76.37	▲76.37
BN	Teng Chang Yeow	3,902	22.50	▼10.78
Parti Rakyat Malaysia	Chua Cheong Wee	122	0.70	▲0.70
BERSAMA	Lee Zheng Yong	74	0.43	▲0.43
Total valid votes		17,343	100.00	
Total rejected ballots		163		
Unreturned ballots		65		
Turnout		17,571	80.72	▼2.88
Registered electors		21,768		
Majority		9,343	53.87	▲20.62
PKR hold		Swing		
Source(s) "His Majesty's Government Gazette - Notice of Contested Election, State Legislative Assembly for the State of Penang [P.U. (B) 252/2018]" (PDF). Attorney General's Chambers of Malaysia. 3 May 2018. "Federal Government Gazette - Results of Contested Election and Statements of the Poll after the Official Addition of Votes, State Constituencies for the State of Penang [P.U. (B) 326/2018]" (PDF). Attorney General's Chambers of Malaysia. 28 May 2018. Archived from the original (PDF) on 2019-08-29.

Penang state election, 2013: Tanjong Bunga
Party	Candidate	Votes	%	∆%
DAP	Teh Yee Cheu	11,033	66.53	▲8.54
BN	Chia Kwang Chye	5,518	33.28	▼8.73
Independent	Beh Seong Leng	33	0.20	▲0.20
Total valid votes		16,584	100.00	
Total rejected ballots		193		
Unreturned ballots		0		
Turnout		16,777	83.60	▲10.51
Registered electors		20,068		
Majority		5,515	33.25	▲17.27
DAP hold		Swing		

Penang state election, 2008: Tanjong Bunga
Party	Candidate	Votes	%	∆%
DAP	Teh Yee Cheu	7,021	57.99	▲34.48
BN	Chia Loong Thye	5,086	42.01	▼34.48
Total valid votes		12,107	100.00	
Total rejected ballots		220		
Unreturned ballots		32		
Turnout		12,359	73.09	▼0.24
Registered electors		16,910		
Majority		1,935	15.98	▼37.00
DAP gain from BN		Swing		?

Penang state election, 2004: Tanjong Bunga
Party	Candidate	Votes	%	∆%
BN	Koh Tsu Koon	8,985	76.49	▲8.97
DAP	Lim Cheng Heo	2,761	23.51	▼5.76
Total valid votes		11,746	100.00	
Total rejected ballots		286		
Unreturned ballots		274		
Turnout		12,306	73.33	▲0.13
Registered electors		16,782		
Majority		6,224	52.98	▲14.73
BN hold		Swing		

Penang state election, 1999: Tanjong Bunga
Party	Candidate	Votes	%	
BN	Koh Tsu Koon	12,111	67.52	▼1.09
DAP	Wong Hang Yoke	5,250	29.27	▲1.09
Total valid votes		17,361	100.00	
Total rejected ballots		390		
Unreturned ballots		186		
Turnout		17,937	73.20	▼4.59
Registered electors		24,504		
Majority		6,861	39.52	▼2.18
BN hold		Swing		

Penang state election, 1995: Tanjong Bunga
Party	Candidate	Votes	%	∆%
BN	Koh Tsu Koon	13,087	70.85	▲17.28
DAP	Lim Kit Siang	5,384	29.15	▼17.28
Total valid votes		18,471	100.00	
Total rejected ballots		344		
Unreturned ballots		27		
Turnout		18,842	77.79	▲2.95
Registered electors		24,222		
Majority		7,703	41.70	▲34.56
BN hold		Swing		

Penang state election, 1990: Tanjong Bunga
Party	Candidate	Votes	%	∆%
BN	Koh Tsu Koon	7,585	53.57	▼2.98
DAP	Gooi Hock Seng	6,573	46.43	▲2.98
Total valid votes		14,158	100.00	
Total rejected ballots		316		
Unreturned ballots		16		
Turnout		14,490	74.84	▲3.19
Registered electors		19,362		
Majority		1,012	7.15	▼5.96
BN hold		Swing		

Penang state election, 1986: Tanjong Bunga
Party	Candidate	Votes	%	∆%
BN	Khoo Boo Yeang	7,127	56.55	▼3.29
DAP	Peter Dason Muthu Jaha Dason	5,475	43.45	▲6.39
Total valid votes		12,602	100.00	
Total rejected ballots		416		
Unreturned ballots		0		
Turnout		13,018	71.65	▼4.23
Registered electors		18,170		
Majority		1,652	13.11	▼9.68
BN hold		Swing		

Penang state election, 1982: Tanjong Bunga
Party	Candidate	Votes	%	∆%
BN	Khor Ngak Seng @ Khor Gark Kim	10,250	59.84	▼6.98
DAP	Peter Dason Muthu Jaha Dason	6,347	37.05	▲6.10
BEBAS	Soosai Savarimuthu	532	3.11	▲3.11
Total valid votes		17,129	100.00	
Total rejected ballots		366		
Unreturned ballots		0		
Turnout		17,495	75.87	▼1.66
Registered electors		23,058		
Majority		3,903	22.79	▼13.08
BN hold		Swing		

Penang state election, 1978: Tanjong Bunga
Party	Candidate	Votes	%	∆%
BN	Khor Ngak Seng @ Khor Gark Kim	9,637	66.82	▲9.30
DAP	Khoo Soo Hoe	4,464	30.95	▼1.91
SDP	Gopal Nair	322	2.23	▲2.23
Total valid votes		14,423	100.00	
Total rejected ballots		427		
Unreturned ballots		0		
Turnout		14,850	77.53	▼0.96
Registered electors		19,154		
Majority		5,173	35.87	▲11.21
BN hold		Swing		

Penang state election, 1974: Tanjong Bunga
Party	Candidate	Votes	%	∆%
BN	Khor Ngak Seng @ Khor Gark Kim	6,226	57.52	▲57.52
DAP	Khoo Soo Hoe	3,557	32.86	▼18.29
PEKEMAS	James Ronald Pedley	624	5.76	▲5.76
Parti Sosialis Rakyat Malaysia	Low Ko Chin	418	3.86	▲3.86
Total valid votes		10,825	100.00	
Total rejected ballots		210		
Unreturned ballots		0		
Turnout		11,035	78.49	▲4.57
Registered electors		14,060		
Majority		2,669	24.66	▲22.35
BN gain from DAP		Swing		-

Penang state election, 1969: Tanjong Bungah
Party	Candidate	Votes	%	∆%
DAP	Khoo Soo Giap	4,855	51.15	▲51.15
Alliance	Choong Ewe Leong	4,636	48.85	▼9.54
Total valid votes		9,491	100.00	
Total rejected ballots		635		
Unreturned ballots		0		
Turnout		10,126	73.92	▼9.31
Registered electors		13,699		
Majority		219	2.31	▼23.15
DAP gain from Alliance		Swing		-

Penang state election, 1964: Tanjong Bungah
Party	Candidate	Votes	%	∆%
Alliance	Cheah Seng Khim	5,669	58.38	▲5.20
Socialist Front	Othman Salleh	3,197	32.92	▲14.33
UDP	Mohd. Said Salleh	844	8.69	▲8.69
Total valid votes		9,710	100.00	
Total rejected ballots		270		
Unreturned ballots		0		
Turnout		9,980	83.23	▲9.75
Registered electors		11,991		
Majority		2,472	25.46	▼5.37
Alliance hold		Swing		

Penang state election, 1959: Tanjong Bungah
Party	Candidate	Votes	%
Alliance	Cheah Seng Khim	3,538	53.18
PMIP	Abdul Hamid	1,487	22.35
Socialist Front	Harun Puteh	1,237	18.59
PPP	Foo Ah Soo	391	5.88
Total valid votes		6,653	100.00
Total rejected ballots		128	
Unreturned ballots		0	
Turnout		6,781	73.48
Registered electors		9,228	
Majority		2,051	30.83
This was a new constituency created.

== See also ==
- Constituencies of Penang
