= List of electoral districts in Penang =

This is a list of federal and state electoral districts within the Malaysian state of Penang. The state sends 13 representatives to the Malaysian federal Parliament and is divided into 40 state constituencies, each of which elects a single member of the Penang State Legislative Assembly. The state constituencies are denoted by Nxx, whereas the federal constituencies are denoted by Pxxx. Each federal constituency consists of three to four state constituencies.

== Electoral demographics ==
=== Seberang Perai ===
The city of Seberang Perai, which encompasses the mainland half of Penang, sends 21 representatives to the Penang State Legislative Assembly and 7 Members of Parliament. The ethnicity that formed the plurality within each constituency is highlighted in bold.

Federal constituency	State constituency	Population				Registered voters			
Federal constituency	State constituency	Total (2020)	Malay (%)	Chinese (%)	Indian (%)	Total (2023)	Malay (%)	Chinese (%)	Indian (%)
P041 Kepala Batas	N01 Penaga	28,207	**94.9**	3.3	0.4	25,468	**93.0**	6.3	0.4
P041 Kepala Batas	N02 Bertam	25,194	**70.7**	16.4	5.2	23,999	**68.9**	21.8	8.7
P041 Kepala Batas	N03 Pinang Tunggal	63,642	**83.4**	7.9	4.2	34,723	**78.8**	17.1	3.7
P042 Tasek Gelugor	N04 Permatang Berangan	39,561	**87.3**	3.8	3.8	28,519	**86.7**	6.3	6.6
P042 Tasek Gelugor	N05 Sungai Dua	37,508	**74.9**	20.8	2.9	28,100	**81.1**	16.0	2.4
P042 Tasek Gelugor	N06 Telok Ayer Tawar	29,830	**60.2**	26.6	8.3	24,784	**64.8**	23.8	10.1
P043 Bagan	N07 Sungai Puyu	49,443	17.8	**67.7**	7.3	35,904	8.4	**83.1**	8.1
P043 Bagan	N08 Bagan Jermal	34,358	21.0	**55.5**	14.2	32,529	16.0	**66.7**	16.7
P043 Bagan	N09 Bagan Dalam	28,911	21.3	**54.3**	15.4	21,221	23.0	**49.7**	26.5
P044 Permatang Pauh	N10 Seberang Jaya	93,836	**68.7**	13.6	7.2	49,215	**68.5**	18.3	12.1
P044 Permatang Pauh	N11 Permatang Pasir	34,309	**76.6**	17.7	3.8	30,464	**75.4**	22.1	2.1
P044 Permatang Pauh	N12 Penanti	31,844	**83.1**	14.2	1.2	28,170	**79.8**	17.8	1.7
P045 Bukit Mertajam	N13 Berapit	28,128	10.8	**69.9**	9.4	29,076	5.1	**83.6**	10.8
P045 Bukit Mertajam	N14 Machang Bubuk	95,164	32.8	**50.5**	10.8	56,538	35.2	**51.4**	12.7
P045 Bukit Mertajam	N15 Padang Lalang	39,655	21.0	**67.9**	8.0	36,001	12.9	**78.4**	8.2
P046 Batu Kawan	N16 Perai	26,435	21.8	**37.3**	25.7	20,479	13.3	**49.9**	35.6
P046 Batu Kawan	N17 Bukit Tengah	76,060	28.3	**30.0**	9.5	31,635	36.1	**46.1**	16.8
P046 Batu Kawan	N18 Bukit Tambun	61,973	25.6	**41.3**	16.9	37,496	17.7	**62.5**	19.3
P047 Nibong Tebal	N19 Jawi	37,397	29.7	**44.2**	23.6	36,601	21.3	**52.6**	25.6
P047 Nibong Tebal	N20 Sungai Bakap	56,802	**56.1**	27.3	15.0	38,409	**59.4**	22.5	17.4
P047 Nibong Tebal	N21 Sungai Acheh	27,835	**62.3**	27.7	8.2	26,095	**63.8**	27.7	7.6

=== George Town ===
The city of George Town, which encompasses Penang Island and the surrounding islets, sends 19 representatives to the Penang State Legislative Assembly and 6 Members of Parliament. The ethnicity that formed the plurality within each constituency is highlighted in bold.

Federal constituency	State constituency	Population				Registered voters			
Federal constituency	State constituency	Total (2020)	Malay (%)	Chinese (%)	Indian (%)	Total (2023)	Malay (%)	Chinese (%)	Indian (%)
P048 Bukit Bendera	N22 Tanjong Bunga	47,717	20.8	**55.7**	8.6	29,477	25.9	**59.5**	12.1
P048 Bukit Bendera	N23 Air Putih	14,744	11.2	**74.8**	8.8	15,371	9.9	**80.0**	9.4
P048 Bukit Bendera	N24 Kebun Bunga	28,278	10.3	**68.3**	13.2	24,532	7.2	**75.0**	16.9
P048 Bukit Bendera	N25 Pulau Tikus	33,088	13.0	**60.2**	7.2	23,257	13.7	**75.2**	8.6
P049 Tanjong	N26 Padang Kota	5,900	23.6	**38.0**	11.9	15,165	8.0	**72.6**	18.5
P049 Tanjong	N27 Pengkalan Kota	21,083	9.3	**57.1**	7.8	21,568	2.1	**89.3**	8.2
P049 Tanjong	N28 Komtar	7,826	10.5	**48.3**	7.0	15,532	12.2	**77.8**	8.9
P050 Jelutong	N29 Datok Keramat	23,329	30.5	**55.5**	9.6	26,791	27.0	**55.4**	16.5
P050 Jelutong	N30 Sungai Pinang	55,462	33.9	**46.8**	12.6	34,416	30.7	**48.2**	20.2
P050 Jelutong	N31 Batu Lancang	34,934	8.0	**83.9**	5.2	33,106	6.6	**84.3**	8.3
P051 Bukit Gelugor	N32 Seri Delima	38,045	25.4	**61.2**	7.2	31,574	22.1	**64.6**	12.4
P051 Bukit Gelugor	N33 Air Itam	27,678	23.6	**58.9**	8.6	23,085	23.3	**64.9**	11.1
P051 Bukit Gelugor	N34 Paya Terubong	135,282	17.3	**60.1**	9.4	62,734	7.8	**77.6**	13.8
P052 Bayan Baru	N35 Batu Uban	83,879	31.9	**48.0**	9.4	43,529	25.4	**58.7**	14.7
P052 Bayan Baru	N36 Pantai Jerejak	41,556	36.1	**47.2**	8.8	29,890	35.8	**50.6**	12.5
P052 Bayan Baru	N37 Batu Maung	63,168	**47.0**	34.9	6.9	47,226	**53.1**	36.2	9.5
P053 Balik Pulau	N38 Bayan Lepas	85,321	**54.7**	36.0	4.8	39,754	**63.2**	30.2	5.7
P053 Balik Pulau	N39 Pulau Betong	27,310	**72.5**	22.2	3.4	23,838	**66.3**	28.4	4.3
P053 Balik Pulau	N40 Telok Bahang	19,713	**75.8**	20.5	2.3	17,927	**68.1**	27.6	3.6

== See also ==
- Penang State Legislative Assembly
- Elections in Penang
