= Zairil Khir Johari =

Malaysian politician

Yang Berhormat Tuan Zairil Khir Johari MLA
- زعيرالخير جوهري
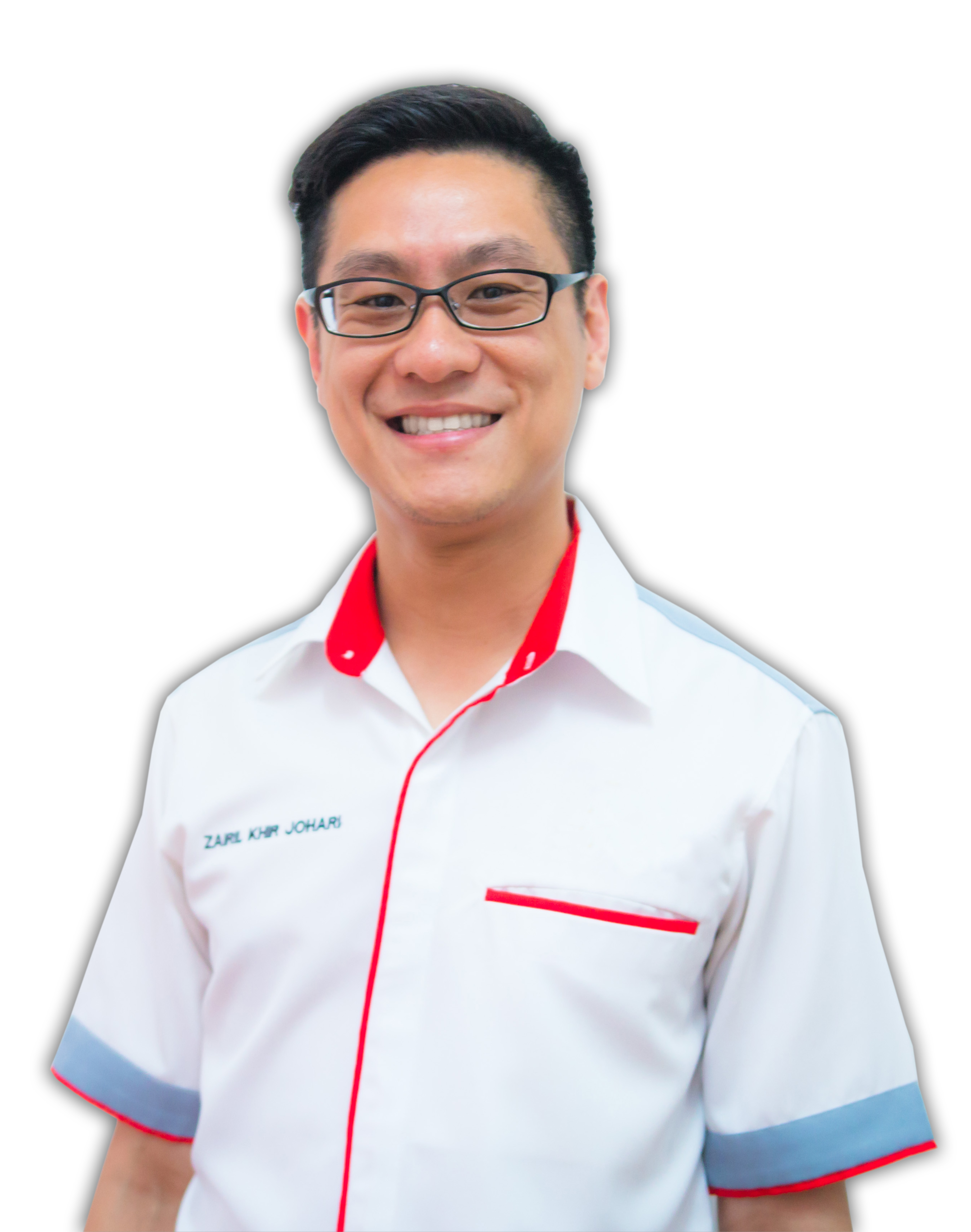

Member of the Penang State Executive Council
- Incumbent
- Assumed office 16 August 2023
- Governor: Ahmad Fuzi Abdul Razak (2023–2025); Ramli Ngah Talib (since 2025)
- Chief Minister: Chow Kon Yeow
- Portfolio: Infrastructure, Transport & Digital Development
- Preceded by: Himself (Infrastructure and Transport); Portfolio established (Digital Development)
- Constituency: Tanjong Bunga
- In office 2020 – 13 August 2023
- Governor: Abdul Rahman Abbas (2020–2021); Ahmad Fuzi Abdul Razak (2021–2023)
- Chief Minister: Chow Kon Yeow
- Portfolio: Infrastructure and Transport
- Preceded by: Portfolio established (Infrastructure); Chow Kon Yeow (Transport)
- In office 16 May 2018 – 2020
- Governor: Abdul Rahman Abbas (2018–2021); Ahmad Fuzi Abdul Razak (2021–2023)
- Chief Minister: Chow Kon Yeow
- Portfolio: Public Works, Utilities & Flood Mitigation
- Preceded by: Lim Hock Seng (Public Works, Utilities); Chow Kon Yeow (Flood Mitigation)
- Succeeded by: Portfolio abolished (Public Works, Utilities & Flood Mitigation)
- Constituency: Tanjong Bunga

President of Football Association of Penang
- In office 1 February 2017 – 9 October 2017
- Preceded by: Nazir Ariff
- Succeeded by: Tahir Jalaluddin

Executive Director of Penang Institute
- In office March 2014 – December 2016
- Preceded by: Woo Wing Thye
- Succeeded by: Ooi Kee Beng

Assistant National Publicity Secretary of the Democratic Action Party
- In office 29 September 2013 – 20 March 2022 Serving with Yeo Bee Yin
- National Publicity Secretary: Tony Pua Kiam Wee
- Secretary-General: Lim Guan Eng
- Succeeded by: Hannah Yeoh Tseow Suan

State Vice Chairman of the Democratic Action Party of Penang
- Incumbent
- Assumed office 2 December 2013 Serving with Ramasamy Palanisamy (2013–2021); Jagdeep Singh Deo(2021–2024); Yeoh Soon Hin (since 2024)
- Secretary-General: Lim Guan Eng (2013–2022); Anthony Loke Siew Fook (since 2022)
- State Chairman: Chow Kon Yeow (2013–2024); Steven Sim Chee Keong (since 2024)

Faction represented in Dewan Rakyat
- 2013–2018: Democratic Action Party

Faction represented in Penang State Legislative Assembly
- 2018–: Pakatan Harapan

Personal details
- Born: 17 October 1982 (age 43)
- Citizenship: Malaysian
- Party: Democratic Action Party (DAP)
- Other political affiliations: Pakatan Rakyat (PR) (2008–2015); Pakatan Harapan (PH) (since 2015)
- Spouse(s): Ulfah Zainal Abidin (m. 2005; d. 2008); Noor Dahlia Hamzah (m. 2011; d. 2017); Dyana Sofya Mohd Daud (m. 2018)
- Parent: Khir Johari (Father)
- Education: Multimedia University (BSc); School of Oriental and African Studies, University of London (MA)
- Occupation: Politician
- Website: zairil.com

Zairil Khir Johari (born 17 October 1982) is a Malaysian politician who has served as Member of the Penang State Executive Council (EXCO) in the Pakatan Harapan (PH) state administration under Chief Minister Chow Kon Yeow and Member of the Penang State Legislative Assembly (MLA) for Tanjong Bunga since May 2018. He served as the Member of Parliament (MP) for Bukit Bendera from May 2013 to May 2018. He is a member of the Democratic Action Party, a component party of the PH coalition. In DAP, he served as the Assistant National Publicity Secretary from September 2013 to March 2022, State Vice Chairman of Penang since December 2013 and Parliamentary Spokesperson of Education, Science and Technology. He is the son of Khir Johari, former federal minister and prominent politician from Barisan Nasional (BN) and Alliance.

== Early life, education and early career ==
Zairil attended the Multimedia University in Cyberjaya, graduating with a bachelor's degree in Information Systems Engineering. He then received a Master of Arts from the School of Oriental and African Studies, University of London. Upon his return to Malaysia, he started Chocolab, where he was the chief executive officer. In late 2010, he left the business to pursue politics full-time.

== Political career ==
=== Member of the Democratic Action Party (since 2010) ===
In 2010, Zairil joined the DAP, a component party of Pakatan Rakyat (PR) in opposition to the BN and UMNO federal government. The choice, given that his father was a prominent UMNO politician and that he would be a rare Malay member of the DAP, attracted significant attention. He claimed that UMNO had changed for the worse since his father was a politician, and that "after more than 50 years of UMNO rule, the situation is such that people are being colonised, oppressed by our own people, we do not have any freedom."

=== Political Secretary to the Secretary-General ===
On 23 February 2011, he was appointed the Political Secretary to Lim Guan Eng, the DAP Secretary-General and Chief Minister of Penang with immediate effect. He henceforth assisted Lim with political matters at party and national level. He was based at the DAP Secretariat in Kuala Lumpur.

=== State Vice Chairman of Penang (since 2013) ===
In 2013 Penang state party convention, Zairil was elected into the DAP Penang State Committee and subsequently appointed vice-chairman. In the 2015 state party convention, he was reelected into the committee, placing third highest out of the fifteen elected members with a total vote of 490 out of 760 delegates, he was reappointed to the same position. In the 2018 Penang state party convention, a major surprise emerged after he was defeated, however, he was co-opted into the committee to save his state vice chairmanship. In the 2021 state party convention, he was reelected this time after his defeat in 2018 and retained his state vice-chairmanship.

=== Assistant National Publicity Secretary (2013–2022) ===
At the DAP National Congress in December 2012, Zairil was elected to the Central Executive Committee (CEC) and appointed the Assistant National Publicity Secretary. The election was re-run in 2013, after a tabulation error that had resulted in his exclusion. He was successful again the second time around. In November 2017, Zairil was once again re-elected into the CEC and re-appointed the Assistant National Publicity Secretary. In the 2013 DAP National Congress, he was elected into the central executive committee and appointed the National Assistant Publicity Secretary, he was reelected and reappointed in 2017 National Congress. However, in the 2022 National Congress, he was not reelected into the CEC and was replaced by Hannah Yeoh Tseow Suan as the Assistant National Publicity Secretary.

=== Penang Institute ===
From 2012 to 2016, Zairil headed the Penang Institute, a public policy think tank to the State Government of Penang. Zairil has been in the forefront of co-ordinating most of its major activities in propagating the cause of Penang on the national and international arenas, and providing realistic solutions for the economic and social sustenance of the people of the Penang region Under his leadership, the Institute organised the ASEAN Coalition for Clean Governance (ACCG). The inaugural conference was held in June 2012, attracting participants from seven countries around the region.

In March 2014, Zairil was promoted to the post of executive director and continued to hold this post until December 2016, when he stepped down to take over the reins of the Football Association of Penang. He has since been appointed a Senior Fellow of Penang Institute.

=== Member of Parliament (2013–2018) ===
In the 2013 general election, Zairil won the Bukit Bendera parliamentary seat polling 45,591 votes defeating Barisan National candidate with 32,778 majority. He also gained one of the highest majorities in the election. He was also the youngest candidate to win a federal seat in the election at the age of 30.

=== Member of the Penang State Legislative Assembly (since 2018) ===
In the 2018 Penang state election, Zairil was fielded to contest the Tanjong Bunga seat where he faced off against Barisan Nasional Penang Chairman Teng Chang Yeow. Considered one of the more challenging seats due to controversies involving the former Tanjong Bunga MLA from DAP who had left the party, Zairil went on to defeat Teng by a margin of 9,343 votes, nearly doubling the margin in the previous election. Following his defeat, Teng announced his retirement from politics. Zairil was not nominated to contest his Bukit Bendera seat after holding for a term from 2013 to 2018 and hence transferred to the Penang state level from the federal level.

=== Member of the Penang State Executive Council (since 2018) ===
With Pakatan Harapan emerging victorious and being reelected to the power as the Penang state government in the 2018 Penang state election as well as elected to the power as federal government for the very first time in the 2018 general election, then Chief Minister of Penang Lim Guan Eng was appointed the new Minister of Finance and transferred to the federal level by then Prime Minister Mahathir Mohamad, while National Vice Chairman and State Chairman of Penang of DAP and EXCO member Chow Kon Yeow took over the reins as new Chief Minister of Penang. A new Penang State Executive Council was formed with Zairil being appointed member for Public Works, Utilities and Flood Mitigation. During a mid-term review exercise, Zairil took new portfolios and relinquished the old ones, which are the Infrastructure and Transport, with the latter being an additional portfolio.

Following his re-election to the Penang State Assembly in 2023, Zairil was reappointed a Penang State Executive Councillor holding the Infrastructure, Transport and Digital portfolios.

== Personal life ==
In December 2018, Zairil married lawyer and political activist Dyana Sofya Mohd Daud who was also a candidate in the 2014 Telok Intan by-election. In 2020, Zairil formed a rock band called Priwayat, in which he is the pianist and songwriter.

== Election results ==
Parliament of Malaysia
Year	Constituency	Candidate	Votes	Pct	Opponent(s)	Votes	Pct	Ballots cast	Majority	Turnout
2013	P048 Bukit Bendera	Zairil Khir Johari (DAP)	45,591	77.93%	Teh Leong Meng (Gerakan)	12,813	21.90%	59,114	32,778	83.16%

Penang State Legislative Assembly
Year	Constituency	Candidate	Votes	Pct	Opponent(s)	Votes	Pct	Ballots cast	Majority	Turnout
2018	N22 Tanjong Bunga	Zairil Khir Johari (DAP)	13,245	76.37%	Teng Chang Yeow (Gerakan)	3,902	22.50%	17,571	9,343	80.72%
2018	N22 Tanjong Bunga	Zairil Khir Johari (DAP)	13,245	76.37%	Chua Cheong Wee (PRM)	122	0.70%	17,571	9,343	80.72%
2018	N22 Tanjong Bunga	Zairil Khir Johari (DAP)	13,245	76.37%	Lee Zheng Yong (MUP)	74	0.43%	17,571	9,343	80.72%
2023	N22 Tanjong Bunga	Zairil Khir Johari (DAP)	13,257	72.82%	Hng Chee Wey (Gerakan)	4,430	24.33%	18,331	8,827	62.19%
2023	N22 Tanjong Bunga	Zairil Khir Johari (DAP)	13,257	72.82%	Lee Chui Wah (PRM)	518	2.85%	18,331	8,827	62.19%

== Publications ==
Zairil was a columnist for the now-defunct news portal, The Malaysian Insider, from 2011 until its closure in 2016. He currently writes regularly for The Penang Monthly. In 2017, he published his first book, Finding Malaysia: Making Sense of an Eccentric Nation, a collection of his selected writings on identity politics, political Islam, federalism and education. Finding Malaysia proved to be one of publisher Gerakbudaya's best-selling books of 2017.

Zairil has also published book chapters in Secularism, Religion, and Democracy in Southeast Asia by Vidhu Verma, Policies and Politics in Malaysian Education: Education Reforms, Nationalism and Neoliberalism by Cynthia Joseph, Dialog: Thoughts on Tunku's Timeless Thinking by the think tank IDEAS, and Young and Malay: Growing up in Multicultural Malaysia by Ooi Kee Beng and Wan Hamidi Hamid.

== Awards and honours ==
In recognition of his contributions to the engineering profession, Zairil was conferred the Honorary Fellow Award by the Institution of Engineers Malaysia (IEM) at their 64th Annual Dinner and Awards Night 2023, alongside Malaysian deputy prime minister Dato' Sri Fadillah Yusof.
