= Bukit Bendera (federal constituency) =

Malaysian federal constituency

Bukit Bendera (P048)
Penang constituency

Federal constituency
- Legislature: Dewan Rakyat
- MP: Syerleena Abdul Rashid; PH
- Constituency created: 1974
- First contested: 1974
- Last contested: 2022

Demographics
- Population (2020): 123,827
- Electors (2023): 92,637
- Area (km²): 65
- Pop. density (per km²): 1,905

Bukit Bendera is a federal constituency in Northeast Penang Island District, Penang, Malaysia, that has been represented in the Dewan Rakyat since 1974.

The federal constituency was created in the 1974 redistribution and is mandated to return a single member to the Dewan Rakyat under the first past the post voting system.

== Demographics ==
Ethnic breakdown of Bukit Bendera's electorate as of 2022
1. Chinese (71.0%)
2. Malay (15.2%)
3. Indian (12.0%)
4. Other ethnicities (1.80%)

As of 2020, Bukit Bendera has a population of 123,827 people.

Age breakdown of Bukit Bendera's electorate as of 2022
1. 18-20 (3.60%)
2. 21-29 (13.6%)
3. 30-39 (16.0%)
4. 40-49 (16.5%)
5. 50-59 (17.9%)
6. 60-69 (16.1%)
7. 70-79 (10.8%)
8. 80-89 (4.50%)
9. above 90 (1.01%)
Gender breakdown of Bukit Bendera's electorate as of 2022
1. Male (47.2%)
2. Female (52.8%)

== History ==
=== Polling districts ===
According to the federal gazette issued on 18 July 2023, the Bukit Bendera constituency is divided into 30 polling districts.

State constituency	Polling districts	Code	Location
Tanjong Bunga (N22)	Batu Feringgi	048/22/01	SJK (C) Pai Chai
Tanjong Bunga (N22)	Jalan Vale Of Tempe	048/22/02	SK Tanjung Bunga
Tanjong Bunga (N22)	Kampong Tanjong Bunga	048/22/03	SMK Pendidikan Khas Persekutuan (P) Jalan Lembah Permai
Tanjong Bunga (N22)	Seaview Park	048/22/04	SMK Tanjong Bunga
Tanjong Bunga (N22)	Jalan Gajah	048/22/05	SJK (C) Hun Bin
Tanjong Bunga (N22)	Tanjong Tokong	048/22/06	SK Tanjong Tokong
Tanjong Bunga (N22)	Sungai Kelian	048/22/07	SJK (C) Poay Wah
Air Putih (N23)	Bukit Bendera	048/23/01	Dewan Jawatankuasa Kemajuan Dan Keselamatan Kampong (JKKK) Bukit Bendera
Air Putih (N23)	Stesyen Bawah	048/23/02	Dewan Jawatankuasa Kemajuan Dan Keselamatan Kampong (JKKK) Bukit Bendera
Air Putih (N23)	Jalan Lintang	048/23/03	SJK (C) Kong Min Pusat
Air Putih (N23)	Hye Keat Estate	048/23/04	SJK (C) Kong Min Pusat
Air Putih (N23)	Reservoir Gardens	048/23/05	SJK (C) Chung Hwa Confucian 'A'
Air Putih (N23)	Race Course	048/23/06	SJK (C) Shang Wu
Air Putih (N23)	Taman Sempadan	048/23/07	SJK (C) Chung Hwa Confucian 'B'
Kebun Bunga (N24)	Fettes Park	048/24/01	SM Phor Tay (Persendirian)
Kebun Bunga (N24)	Ladang Hong Seng	048/24/02	SM Phor Tay (Persendirian)
Kebun Bunga (N24)	Taman Bunga	048/24/03	SJK (C) Phor Tay
Kebun Bunga (N24)	Quarry Drive	048/24/04	SMK Padang Polo
Kebun Bunga (N24)	Jalan Batu Gantong	048/24/05	SK St. Xavier
Kebun Bunga (N24)	Rifle Range Blok A B C	048/24/06	SK Padang Tembak
Kebun Bunga (N24)	Rifle Range Road	048/24/07	SK Padang Tembak
Kebun Bunga (N24)	Rifle Range Blok D E F	048/24/08	Parkir Pasar Awam Padang Tembak
Pulau Tikus (N25)	Pantai Molek	048/25/01	SJK (C) Perempuan China
Pulau Tikus (N25)	Jalan Punchak Erskine	048/25/02	SMJK Perempuan China
Pulau Tikus (N25)	Taman Gottlieb	048/25/03	SMJK Perempuan China
Pulau Tikus (N25)	College Avenue	048/25/04	SK St Xavier Cawangan
Pulau Tikus (N25)	Bangkok Line	048/25/05	SMK Westlands
Pulau Tikus (N25)	Peel Avenue	048/25/06	Pusat Kecermelangan Sukan Westlands
Pulau Tikus (N25)	Taman Berjaya	048/25/07	SK St. Xavier Cawangan
Pulau Tikus (N25)	Barrack Road	048/25/08	SK Jalan Residensi

=== Representation history ===
Members of Parliament for Bukit Bendera
Parliament	No	Years	Member	Party	Vote Share
Constituency created from Penang Utara and Penang Selatan
4th	P041	1974–1978	Albert Mah (马骐骝)	BN (MCA)	18,186; 57.07%
5th	P041	1978–1982	Peter Paul Dason (பீட்டர் பால் டேசன்)	DAP	21,864; 51.04%
6th	P041	1982–1986	Gooi Hock Seng (魏福星)	DAP	27,440; 54.78%
7th	P044	1986–1990	Gooi Hock Seng (魏福星)	DAP	22,512; 58.50%
8th	P044	1990–1995	Gooi Hock Seng (魏福星)	GR (DAP)	25,978; 62.60%
9th	P047	1995–1999	Chia Kwang Chye (谢宽泰)	BN (GERAKAN)	26,683; 52.89%
10th	P047	1999–2004	Chia Kwang Chye (谢宽泰)	BN (GERAKAN)	24,280; 50.11%
11th	P048	2004–2008	Chia Kwang Chye (谢宽泰)	BN (GERAKAN)	28,281; 61.69%
12th	P048	2008–2013	Liew Chin Tong (刘镇东)	PR (DAP)	31,243; 67.37%
13th	P048	2013–2015	Zairil Khir Johari (زعير الخير جوهري)	PR (DAP)	45,591; 78.06%
13th	P048	2015–2018	Zairil Khir Johari (زعير الخير جوهري)	PH (DAP)	45,591; 78.06%
14th	P048	2018–2022	Wong Hon Wai (黄汉伟)	PH (DAP)	50,049; 83.83%
15th	P048	2022–present	Syerleena Abdul Rashid (شيرلينا عبد الرشيد)	PH (DAP)	49,353; 78.98%

=== State constituency ===
Parliamentary constituency	State constituency						
Parliamentary constituency	1955–1959*	1959–1974	1974–1986	1986–1995	1995–2004	2004–2018	2018–present
Bukit Bendera					Air Itam		
Bukit Bendera						Air Putih	
Bukit Bendera			Ayer Itam				
Bukit Bendera				Kebun Bunga			
Bukit Bendera			Paya Terubong				
Bukit Bendera						Pulau Tikus	
Bukit Bendera			Tanjong Bunga				

=== Historical boundaries ===
State Constituency	Area				
State Constituency	1974	1984	1994	2003	2018
Air Itam	Air Itam; Air Putih; Bukit Cendana; Hye Keat Estate; Western Road	Air Itam; Air Putih; Bukit Bendera; Bukit Cendana; Hye Keat Estate			
Air Putih				Air Putih; Bukit Bendera; Bukit Cendana; Hye Keat Estate; Jalan Boundary	
Kebun Bunga		Fettes Park; Jesselton Heights; Kebun Bunga; Pulau Tikus; Rifle Range		Bukit Olivia; Fettes Park; Jesselton Heights; Kebun Bunga; Rifle Range	
Paya Terubong	Farlim; Happy Valley; Kampung Baru; Paya Terubong; Thean Teik Avenue				
Pulau Tikus				Gottlieb Road; Kampung Sireh; Kelawei Road; Pulau Tikus; Tanjung Tokong	
Tanjong Bunga	Batu Ferringhi; Kampung Permai; Pulau Tikus; Tanjung Bunga; Tanjung Tokong	Batu Ferringhi; Jalan Gajah; Kampung Permai; Tanjung Bunga; Tanjung Tokong			

=== Current state assembly members ===
No.	State Constituency	Member	Coalition (Party)
N22	Tanjong Bunga	Zairil Khir Johari	PH (DAP)
N23	Air Putih	Lim Guan Eng	PH (DAP)
N24	Kebun Bunga	Lee Boon Heng	PH (PKR)
N25	Pulau Tikus	Joshua Woo Sze Zeng	PH (DAP)

=== Local governments & postcodes ===
No.	State Constituency	Local Government	Postcode
N22	Tanjong Bunga	Penang Island City Council	10250, 10350, 10400, 10450, 10470, 10500, 10502, 11050 Penang; 11100 Batu Ferringhi; 11200 Tanjong Bungah; 11300 Penang Hill
N23	Air Putih	Penang Island City Council	10250, 10350, 10400, 10450, 10470, 10500, 10502, 11050 Penang; 11100 Batu Ferringhi; 11200 Tanjong Bungah; 11300 Penang Hill
N24	Kebun Bunga	Penang Island City Council	10250, 10350, 10400, 10450, 10470, 10500, 10502, 11050 Penang; 11100 Batu Ferringhi; 11200 Tanjong Bungah; 11300 Penang Hill
N25	Pulau Tikus	Penang Island City Council	10250, 10350, 10400, 10450, 10470, 10500, 10502, 11050 Penang; 11100 Batu Ferringhi; 11200 Tanjong Bungah; 11300 Penang Hill

== Election results ==
Malaysian general election, 2022
Party	Candidate	Votes	%	∆%
PH	Syerleena Abdul Rashid	49,353	78.98	▲78.98
PN	Hng Chee Wey	6,743	10.79	▲10.79
BN	Richie Huan Xin Yun	5,417	8.67	▼6.94
Parti Rakyat Malaysia	Teh Yee Cheu	677	1.08	▲1.08
Independent	Razali Mohd Zin	299	0.48	▲0.48
Total valid votes		62,489	100.00	
Total rejected ballots		653		
Unreturned ballots		658		
Turnout		63,404	69.00	▼11.50
Registered electors		92,521		
Majority		42,610	68.19	▼0.03
PH hold		Swing		
Source(s) https://lom.agc.gov.my/ilims/upload/portal/akta/outputp/1753273/PUB609%20(2022).pdf

Malaysian general election, 2018
Party	Candidate	Votes	%	∆%
PKR	Wong Hon Wai	50,049	83.83	▲5.77
BN	Andy Yong Kim Seng	9,318	15.61	▼6.33
BERSAMA	Tan Gim Theam	339	0.57	▲0.57
Total valid votes		59,706	100.00	
Total rejected ballots		512		
Unreturned ballots		211		
Turnout		60,429	80.50	▼2.67
Registered electors		75,069		
Majority		40,731	68.22	▲12.10
PKR hold		Swing		
Source(s) "His Majesty's Government Gazette - Notice of Contested Election, Parliament for the State of Penang [P.U. (B) 236/2018]" (PDF). Attorney General's Chambers of Malaysia. 3 May 2018. "Federal Government Gazette - Results of Contested Election and Statements of the Poll after the Official Addition of Votes, Parliamentary Constituencies for the State of Penang [P.U. (B) 310/2018]" (PDF). Attorney General's Chambers of Malaysia. 28 May 2018.

Malaysian general election, 2013
Party	Candidate	Votes	%	∆%
DAP	Zairil Khir Johari	45,591	78.06	▲10.69
BN	Teh Leong Meng	12,813	21.94	▼10.69
Total valid votes		58,404	100.00	
Total rejected ballots		615		
Unreturned ballots		99		
Turnout		59,118	83.17	▲10.19
Registered electors		71,085		
Majority		32,778	56.12	▲21.38
DAP hold		Swing		
Source(s) "Federal Government Gazette - Notice of Contested Election, Parliament for the State of Penang [P.U. (B) 173/2013]" (PDF). Attorney General's Chambers of Malaysia. 26 April 2013. "Federal Government Gazette - Results of Contested Election and Statements of the Poll after the Official Addition of Votes, Parliamentary Constituencies for the State of Penang [P.U. (B) 214/2013]" (PDF). Attorney General's Chambers of Malaysia. 22 May 2013. Archived from the original (PDF) on 22 March 2019.

Malaysian general election, 2008
Party	Candidate	Votes	%	∆%
DAP	Liew Chin Tong	31,243	67.37	▲29.06
BN	Chia Kwang Chye	15,131	32.63	▼29.06
Total valid votes		46,374	100.00	
Total rejected ballots		642		
Unreturned ballots		89		
Turnout		47,105	72.98	▲1.05
Registered electors		64,545		
Majority		16,112	34.74	▲11.36
DAP gain from BN		Swing		?

Malaysian general election, 2004
Party	Candidate	Votes	%	∆%
BN	Chia Kwang Chye	28,281	61.69	▲11.58
DAP	Zulkifli Mohd Noor	17,564	38.31	▼11.58
Total valid votes		45,845	100.00	
Total rejected ballots		998		
Unreturned ballots		0		
Turnout		46,843	71.93	▲0.27
Registered electors		65,123		
Majority		10,717	23.38	▲23.16
BN hold		Swing		

Malaysian general election, 1999
Party	Candidate	Votes	%	∆%
BN	Chia Kwang Chye	24,280	50.11	▼2.78
DAP	Lim Kit Siang	24,176	49.89	▲2.78
Total valid votes		48,456	100.00	
Total rejected ballots		1,051		
Unreturned ballots		380		
Turnout		49,887	71.66	▼3.12
Registered electors		69,616		
Majority		104	0.22	▼5.56
BN hold		Swing		

Malaysian general election, 1995
Party	Candidate	Votes	%	∆%
BN	Chia Kwang Chye	26,683	52.89	▲15.49
DAP	Gooi Hock Seng @ Goi Hock Seng	23,765	47.11	▼15.49
Total valid votes		50,448	100.00	
Total rejected ballots		1,112		
Unreturned ballots		217		
Turnout		51,777	74.78	▲0.59
Registered electors		69,239		
Majority		2,918	5.78	▼9.42
BN gain from DAP		Swing		?

Malaysian general election, 1990
Party	Candidate	Votes	%	∆%
DAP	Gooi Hock Seng	25,978	62.60	▲4.10
BN	David Choong Ewe Leong	15,519	37.40	▼4.10
Total valid votes		41,497	100.00	
Total rejected ballots		813		
Unreturned ballots		0		
Turnout		42,310	74.19	▲2.28
Registered electors		57,027		
Majority		10,459	15.20	▼1.80
DAP hold		Swing		

Malaysian general election, 1986
Party	Candidate	Votes	%	∆%
DAP	Gooi Hock Seng	22,512	58.50	▲3.72
BN	Khor Gark Kim	15,972	41.50	▼3.72
Total valid votes		38,484	100.00	
Total rejected ballots		859		
Unreturned ballots		0		
Turnout		39,343	71.91	▼4.38
Registered electors		54,711		
Majority		6,540	17.00	▲7.44
DAP hold		Swing		

Malaysian general election, 1982
Party	Candidate	Votes	%	∆%
DAP	Gooi Hock Seng	27,440	54.78	▲3.74
BN	Tan Koon Teik	22,649	45.22	▲3.31
Total valid votes		50,089	100.00	
Total rejected ballots		1,225		
Unreturned ballots		0		
Turnout		51,314	76.29	▼2.32
Registered electors		67,261		
Majority		4,791	9.56	▲0.43
DAP hold		Swing		

Malaysian general election, 1978
Party	Candidate	Votes	%	∆%
DAP	Peter Paul Dason	21,864	51.04	▲21.52
BN	H'ng Hung Yong	17,954	41.91	▼15.16
SDP	Oh Keng Seng	3,022	7.05	▲7.05
Total valid votes		42,840	100.00	
Total rejected ballots		1,073		
Unreturned ballots		0		
Turnout		43,913	78.61	▼0.96
Registered electors		55,860		
Majority		3,910	9.13	▼18.42
DAP gain from BN		Swing		?

Malaysian general election, 1974
Party	Candidate	Votes	%
BN	Albert Mah	18,186	57.07
DAP	Peter Paul Dason	9,408	29.52
PEKEMAS	Wong Hoong Yin	2,138	6.71
Parti Rakyat Malaysia	Lee Yong Chew @ Lee Leong Soo	2,135	6.70
Total valid votes		31,867	100.00
Total rejected ballots		785	
Unreturned ballots		0	
Turnout		32,652	79.57
Registered electors		41,033	
Majority		8,778	27.55
This was a new constituency created.
