= Penang Undersea Tunnel =

- Interactive map of Penang Undersea Tunnel

Overview
- Location: Penang, Malaysia
- Route: Penang Undersea Tunnel

Operation
- Constructed: Consortium Zenith BUCG Sdn Bhd
- Owner: State Government of Penang; Consortium Zenith BUCG Sdn Bhd

Technical
- Length: 7.2 km (4.5 mi)
- Operating speed: 90 km/h

The Penang Undersea Tunnel is a tunnel under planning between Butterworth on the mainland and George Town on the island of Penang in northern Malaysia. The 7.2 km tunnel will connect Butterworth, Seberang Perai in the east to George Town, Penang Island in the west. When completed in 2025, it will become the first undersea tunnel in Malaysia and the second in Southeast Asia after the Marina Coastal Expressway (MCE) in Singapore. The undersea tunnel is part of the Penang Roads and Tunnels project.

The project is undertaken by the State Government of Penang and the main contractor Consortium Zenith BUCG Sdn Bhd a member of Zenith Group. With a cost of RM6.3 billion, the tunnel will be the largest privately funded public works project in Penang. There will be a toll plaza and also a railway reserve for future Penang LRT at the undersea tunnel.

== Controversies ==
=== Bribery ===
In July 2018, Consortium Zenith Construction Sdn Bhd's (CZC) senior executive director Datuk Zarul Ahmad Mohd Zulkifli confirmed that CZC paid out the RM22 million to two individuals but did not elaborate further. In April 2019, businessman G Gnanaraja was charged with cheating Consortium Zenith Construction Sdn Bhd executive director Zarul Ahmad Mohd Zulkifli of RM19 million between July and August 2017 at various locations in Petaling Jaya and Kuala Lumpur relating to Penang undersea tunnel project, he was arrested by the MACC.

Routes across Penang Strait as of 2014

=== Leaked documents ===
In February 2019, blogger Raja Petra Kamarudin started publishing series of articles on the Penang undersea tunnel corruption scandal based on leaked MACC document which alleged the former chief minister Lim Guan Eng and various Pakatan Harapan and Barisan Nasional leaders in kickbacks amounting to hundreds of millions.

UMNO secretary-general Annuar Musa called for a probe into the alleged leak of Malaysian Anti-Corruption Commission (MACC) investigation papers by Raja Petra Kamarudin. Gerakan Vice President Oh Tong Keong urged Penang state executive councillors and former chief minister Lim Guan Eng should take controversial blogger Raja Petra Kamarudin to court for defamation over the latter's undersea tunnel graft allegations. MCA president Wee Ka Siong urged the Malaysian Anti-Corruption Commission (MACC) to confirm the authenticity of leaked documents allegedly linked to its investigations into the Penang undersea tunnel project. MACC confirmed that it was investigating the matter and that it had opened six investigation papers on the tunnel project. MACC lodged a police report in February 2019 over the leaked investigation papers. Deputy Minister in the Prime Minister's Department Mohamed Hanipa Maidin responding in the Dewan Rakyat confirmed that MACC had lodged the report on 28 February and the matter was being investigated.

== List of interchanges ==
=== Tunnel side ===
Km	Exit	Interchange	To	Remarks
9.2	6200	Bagan Ajam South Interchange	Butterworth Outer Ring Road Butterworth Outer Ring Road North; Teluk Air Tawar; Butterworth; Sungai Petani; Ipoh; South; Seberang Jaya; Perai; Kulim; Gerik	Interchange
Butterworth Outer Ring Road Butterworth Outer Ring Road
Penang Undersea Tunnel
Bagan Ajam toll plaza
		Penang Undersea Tunnel; North Channel, Penang		Start/End of tunnel
		Penang Undersea Tunnel; North Channel, Penang		
		Penang Undersea Tunnel; North Channel, Penang		Start/End of tunnel
2.1	6201	Gurney Drive Paired Road Interchange	Northwest; Gurney Drive Paired Road; Persiaran Gurney (Gurney Drive); Tanjung Bungah; Batu Feringghi	Interchange
Penang Undersea Tunnel
George Town Inner Ring Road
			Southwest; George Town Inner Ring Road; Town centre Jalan Sultan Ahmad Shah (Northam Road)	

=== Gurney Drive Paired Road side ===
Km	Exit	Interchange	To	Remarks
5.32	6202	Penang Undersea Tunnel Interchange	Penang Undersea Tunnel East; Ipoh; Butterworth; Alor Setar Southwest; George Town Inner Ring Road; Town centre Jalan Sultan Ahmad Shah (Northam Road)	Three–cloverleaf interchange
Penang Undersea Tunnel
Gurney Drive Paired Road
N/A	6202A	Gurney Drive-PORR Interchange	South; Penang Outer Ring Road; Persiaran Gurney (Gurney Drive); Batu Feringghi	Elevated interchange
