= Elections in Penang =

Elections in Malaysian state

Elections in Penang have been held in the Malaysian state of Penang since 1954, and have chosen Penang's elected representatives in the federal Dewan Rakyat and the Penang State Legislative Assembly.

== Federal level ==
=== Federal constituencies ===
- List of Malayan federal electoral districts (1955–1959)#Penang-Province Wellesley
- List of former Malaysian federal electoral districts#Penang
- List of electoral districts in Penang

== State level ==
=== State constituencies ===
- List of Malayan state and settlement electoral districts (1954–1959)#Penang Settlement
- List of former Malaysian state electoral districts#Penang
- List of electoral districts in Penang

== By-Elections ==
=== State Assembly ===
- 2024
1. Sungai Bakap
- 2009
1. Penanti
2. Permatang Pasir
- 1997
1. Sungai Bakap
- 1991
1. Prai
- 1980
1. Pengkalan Kota
- 1978
1. Kampong Kolam
- 1977
1. Bertam
- 1971
1. Muda
- 1965
1. Ayer Itam
- 1963
1. Balik Pulau

=== Dewan Rakyat ===
- 2015
1. Permatang Pauh
- 2014
1. Bukit Gelugor
- 2008
1. Permatang Pauh
- 1995
1. Bagan
- 1964
1. Seberang Selatan
