= Cheah Kah Peng =

Member of the Penang State Legislative Assembly

Yang Berbahagia Dato' Cheah Kah Peng DSPN
- 谢嘉平

Member of the Penang State Legislative Assembly for Kebun Bunga
- In office 5 May 2013 – 8 May 2018
- Preceded by: Jason Ong Khan Lee (PR–PKR)
- Succeeded by: Jason Ong Khan Lee (PH–PKR)
- Majority: 9,030 (2013)

Personal details
- Born: Georgetown, Penang, Malaysia
- Citizenship: Malaysian
- Party: People's Justice Party (PKR) (since 1999)
- Other political affiliations: Pakatan Harapan (PH) (since 2015); Pakatan Rakyat (PR) (2008-2015); Barisan Alternatif (BA) (1999-2004)
- Education: Soochow University (LLB); University of Oxford
- Occupation: Politician
- Profession: Lawyer, painter, writer, filmmaker and activist
- Cheah Kah Peng on Facebook; Cheah Kah Peng on Facebook

Cheah Kah Peng (simplified Chinese: 谢嘉平; traditional Chinese: 謝嘉平; pinyin: Xiè Jiā Píng; Jyutping: Ze6 Gaa1 Ping4; Pe̍h-ōe-jī: Chiā Ka-pêng) is a Malaysian politician, lawyer, painter, writer, filmmaker and human rights activist. He was the Penang State Legislative Assemblyman in Malaysia for the constituency of Kebun Bunga for one term from 2013 to 2018 representing the People's Justice Party (PKR), a component party of Pakatan Harapan (PH).

== Background ==
Cheah Kah Peng was born in Georgetown, Penang. Cheah (谢) is his family name, and Kah Peng (嘉平) is his given name. He studied law in Taiwan at Soochow University, then studied law at the University of Oxford, where he received a Chevening Scholarship.

Living as a young traveller in Europe, Asia and Australia during the 1980s and 1990s he became involved in many civil and human rights campaign activities. He travelled widely as a painter, writer, filmmaker and human rights activist before he returned to Malaysia from Australia during the mid 90s, and practices laws at Cheah Kah Peng & Co., Penang.

== Politics ==
Cheah became one of the earliest founding members of a new National Justice Party (KeADILan) on 4 April 1999 (which subsequently amalgamated with Malaysian People's Party (PRM) to become People's Justice Party (PKR).

The political party he helped to construct focused on dismantling its colonial legacy of racial divide (or apartheid) through tackling institutionalised racism, poverty and inequality. He was elected as member of the party's Supreme Council and served as central committee member from 1999 to 2010. He was reported to be one of the International Human Rights lawyers at risk in international journals from 1999 to 2003 during which he was one of the few lawyers who stood up against Malaysia's draconian Internal Security Act (ISA). In the year 2000, he was arrested and imprisoned in Malaysia for a trumped up charge of obstructing police officers in execution of their duty while the truth was that he tried to stop the police from causing grievous bodily harm to political detainees.

In the 2013 general election, he was picked by PKR to contest and won the Penang state seat of Kebun Bunga to be its assemblyman.

== Controversies ==
In November 2015, Cheah with four other PKR Penang assemblypersons – Ong Chin Wen (Bukit Tengah), Dr Norlela Ariffin (Penanti), Dr T. Jayabalan (Batu Uban) and Lee Khai Loon (Machang Bubok) abstained from voting against a land reclamation motion proposed by the opposition United Malays National Organisation (UMNO); causing a conflict of the Pakatan Harapan (PH) state government and a strained relation with the Chief Minister of Penang then, Lim Guan Eng. In February 2016, Lim announced that Cheah and Ong who was also the state PKR whip had been removed from their positions in the state government-linked companies (GLCs). Cheah was sacked as the director of the Penang Hill Corporation (PHC) while Ong was sacked as the director posts in Penang Invest and Island Golf Properties Bhd, a subsidiary company of Penang Development Corporation.

In 2017, Cheah was excluded from the PH assemblypersons list, who were to register victims of the Penang's devastating floods on 4–5 November in their own constituency for the state's initiated post-flood relief aid of RM700 for every eligible recipient. The Chief Minister Lim announced he together with the Pulau Tikus assemblyperson Yap Soo Huey instead would register floods victims in Cheah's Kebun Bunga constituency, near Botanical Gardens. To counter back, a defiant Cheah held a similar programme not far away from the one organised by the state government.

As speculated, Cheah was dropped by PKR as the PH candidate, to make way of the Kebun Bunga seat for the predecessor assemblyman, Jason Ong Khan Lee returning to contest the 2018 general election. Ong managed to win the election on 9 May 2018 to be the Kebun Bunga assemblyman again.

== Election results ==
Penang State Legislative Assembly
Year	Constituency	Candidate	Votes	Pct	Opponent(s)	Votes	Pct	Ballots cast	Majority	Turnout
2013	N24 Kebun Bunga	Cheah Kah Peng (PKR)	12,366	76.60%	Hng Chee Wey (Gerakan)	3,336	20.70%	15,861	9,030	83.80%
2013	N24 Kebun Bunga	Cheah Kah Peng (PKR)	12,366	76.60%	Jayaraman Kunchu Kannu (IND)	159	1.00%	15,861	9,030	83.80%

== Honours ==
- Penang
  - Officer of the Order of the Defender of State (DSPN) – Dato' (2022)
