= List of Universiti Sains Malaysia alumni =

The following is a list of notable alumni and faculty of Universiti Sains Malaysia (USM).

== Government and politics ==
=== Head of state and governors ===
- TYT Tun Mohd Ali Rustam, Governor of Malacca (2020-Incumbent) and Chief Minister of Malacca (1999-2013).

=== Ministers and Deputy Ministers ===
- Hon. Justin Valentin, Education Minister of Seychelles (2020-Incumbent).
- Yusril Ihza Mahendra, Human Rights & Justice Minister of Indonesia (2004-2007).
- YB Teresa Kok Suh Sim, Member of Parliament for Seputeh & Minister of Primary Industries Malaysia (2018-2020).
- YB Dato’ Seri Idris Jusoh, Member of Parliament for Besut (2013-2022), Minister of Higher Education Malaysia (2013-2018) & Menteri Besar of Terengganu (2004-2008).
- YB Datuk Abdul Rahim Bakri, Deputy Minister of Finance (2020-2022) & Member of Parliament for Kudat (2004-2022).
- YB Datuk Seri Dr. Ronald Kiandee, Minister of Agriculture and Food Industries (2020-2022) & Member of Parliament for Beluran.
- YB Datuk Awang Hashim, Deputy Minister of Human Resources (2020 - 2022) & Member of Parliament for Pendang.
- Dato’ Seri Idris Jala, Minister in the Prime Minister's Department (2009-2015).
- YB Dato’ Dr. Mansor Othman, Deputy Minister of Environment and Water (2021-2022), Deputy Minister of Higher Education (2020-2021) & Member of Parliament for Nibong Tebal (2013-2022).
- YB Dato’ Seri Mahdzir Khalid, Minister of Rural Development (2021-2022), Minister of Education Malaysia (2013-2018) & Menteri Besar of Kedah (2005-2008).
- YB Senator Dato’ Seri Dr. Zulkifli Mohamad Al-Bakri, Minister in the Prime Minister's Department (Islamic Affairs) (2020-2021), Mufti of the Federal Territories (2014-2020).
- YB Dato Sri Lee Kim Shin, Sarawak State Minister for Transport (2019 - Incumbent) & State Assemblyman for Senadin.

=== Menteri Besars and Chief Minister ===
- YAB Chow Kon Yeow, Chief Minister of Penang (2018-Incumbent), Member of Parliament for Tanjung (2018-2022), Member of Parliament for Batu Kawan (2022-Incumbent).
- YAB Dato’ Sri Wan Rosdy Wan Ismail, Menteri Besar of Pahang (2018-Incumbent).
- YAB Dato' Seri Muhammad Sanusi Md Nor, Menteri Besar of Kedah (2020-Incumbent).
- Dato’ Seri Ahmad Said, Menteri Besar of Terengganu (2008-2014).
- Dato' Seri Dr. Md Isa Sabu, Menteri Besar of Perlis (2008-2013).

=== Elected representatives and politicians ===
- Raj Munni Sabu@Aiman Athirah Al-Jundi, Deputy Minister of Women, Family & Community Development (2022-Incumbent), Senator of Dewan Negara (2019-2022), Parliament of Malaysia (2018-2021) & Member Parliament of Sepang (2022-Incumbent)
- Datuk Dr. Chandra Muzaffar, Political Analyst & Deputy President of Parti Keadilan Rakyat(1999-2002).
- Jeff Ooi Chuan Aun, Member Parliament of Jelutong (2008-2018).
- YB Kumaresan Arumugam, Penang state assemblyman of Batu Uban (2018-incumbent).
- YB Syerleena Abdul Rashid, Penang state assemblyman of Seri Delima (2018-2023) & Member Parliament of Bukit Bendera (2022-Incumbent).
- YB Nor Azrina Surip, Member Parliament of Merbok (2018-2022).
- Tun Faisal Ismail Aziz - politician

== Public servants ==
- Tan Sri Abu Kassim Mohamed, Chief Commissioner of Malaysian Anti-Corruption Commission (2010-2016).
- Al-Ishsal Ishak, chairman of Malaysian Communications and Multimedia Commission (2018-2020).
- Tan Sri Dr. Madinah Mohamad, Auditor General of Malaysia (2017-2019).
- Prof. Dr. Md. Nasir Ibrahim, Chief Executive Officer of National Film Development Corporation Malaysia (FINAS) (2021–present).
- Dato' Ramlan bin Harun, Secretary-General of Ministry of Rural Development (KPLB). (2021–present).
- Dato' Suriani binti Dato' Ahmad, Secretary-General of Ministry of Entrepreneur Development and Cooperative (MEDAC) (2020–present), former Secretary-General of Ministry of Communications and Multimedia (KKMM) (2019 - 2020) and Ministry of Women, Family and Community Development (KPWKM) (2017).

== Academia and lecturers ==
- Prof. Emeritus Tan Sri Dato’ Dzulkifli Abdul Razak, rector of International Islamic University of Malaysia (2018-Incumbent) & former vice-chancellor of USM (2000-2011).
- Dr. Lim Boo Liat, an eminent zoologist and mammalogist.
- Tan Sri Datuk Mustafa Mansur, pro-chancellor of USM (2011-2024).
- Prof. Dr. Keat Gin Ooi, academician and historian.
- Prof. Dato’ Dr. Omar Osman, vice-chancellor of DRB-HICOM University (2017-Incumbent) & vice-chancellor of USM (2011-2016).
- Dr. Muhamad Saiful Romli, Assistant Professor of the Department of Finance at the Kulliyyah of Economics and Management Sciences, International Islamic University Malaysia (since 2017).
- Adi Fahrudin, Indonesian professor of social work; visiting associate professor at Universiti Sains Malaysia (1997–1998).

== Muftis and religious scholars ==
- Dato’ Dr. Mohd Asri Zainal Abidin, Mufti of Perlis (2015-Incumbent, 2006–2008).

== Artists, singers and celebrities ==
- Daphne Iking, Malaysia TV host & celebrity.
- Diana Amir, Malaysia Actress & TV Host.
- Nadia Min Dern Heng, Miss World Malaysia 2010.
- Adrian Teh Kean Kok, Malaysia film director.
- Kee Thuan Chye, Malaysia actor, poet, dramatist & journalist.
- Kamarul Bahrin Haron, Ex-Editor in Chief of Astro Awani.
- Azharuddin Ramli@Arja Lee, Malaysia actor & singer.
- Tan Sri Datuk Jins Samsuddin, Malaysia film director & actor.
- Prof. Dr. Samat Salleh, Malaysia actor, theatre activist, film director, former dean & lecturer of School of Arts, USM.
- Zainal Ariffin Abdul Hamid (Zaibo), Malaysia film & drama actor.
- Daniel Lee Chee Hun, Malaysia singer & winner of Malaysian Idol 2005.

== Journalists and activists ==
- Sharkawi Jirim, TV sports commentator & journalist.
- Datuk Dr. Chamil Wariya, TV news journalist.
- Ahmad Fedtri Yahya, TV host Malaysia Hari Ini & Jejak Rasul TV3
- Salina Zakaria, TV3 journalist
- Zainal Rashid Ahmad, Malaysia journalist & author.
