= Hng Chee Wey =

Malaysian politician

- 方志伟

National Treasurer of the Parti Gerakan Rakyat Malaysia until 9.9.2026
- Incumbent
- Assumed office 17 November 2018 - 9 September 2026
- President: Dominic Lau Hoe Chai

Personal details
- Born: Penang
- Citizenship: Malaysia
- Other political affiliations: Barisan Nasional (BN) (until 2018); Perikatan Nasional (PN) (since 2021until 2026)
- Occupation: Politician

Hng Chee Wey is a Malaysian politician who has served as National Treasurer of the Parti Gerakan Rakyat Malaysia (GERAKAN) since November 2018. He was reelected to the position in 2023. He is a member of GERAKAN, a component party of the Perikatan Nasional (PN) and formerly Barisan Nasional (BN) coalitions. He tender his Resignation on 9.9.2026 as Member of Party Gerakan after 31 years in party.

== Election results ==
Penang State Legislative Assembly
Year	Constituency	Candidate	Votes	Pct	Opponent(s)	Votes	Pct	Ballots cast	Majority	Turnout
2013	N24 Kebun Bunga	Hng Chee Wey (Gerakan)	3,336	21.03%	Cheah Kah Peng (PKR)	12,366	77.96%	16,180	9,030	83.80%
2013	N24 Kebun Bunga	Hng Chee Wey (Gerakan)	3,336	21.03%	Jayaraman Kunchu Kannu (IND)	159	1.00%	16,180	9,030	83.80%
2018	N35 Batu Uban	Hng Chee Wey (Gerakan)	3,806	14.52%	Kumaresan Aramugam (PKR)	21,079	80.43%	26,523	17,273	83.08%
2018	N35 Batu Uban	Hng Chee Wey (Gerakan)	3,806	14.52%	Vikneswaran Muniandy (PAS)	1,176	4.49%	26,523	17,273	83.08%
2018	N35 Batu Uban	Hng Chee Wey (Gerakan)	3,806	14.52%	Teoh Kok Siang (MUP)	116	0.44%	26,523	17,273	83.08%
2018	N35 Batu Uban	Hng Chee Wey (Gerakan)	3,806	14.52%	Teoh Kean Liang (PFP)	32	0.12%	26,523	17,273	83.08%
2023	N22 Tanjong Bunga	Hng Chee Wey (Gerakan)	4,430	24.33%	Zairil Khir Johari (DAP)	13,257	72.82%	18,390	8,827	62.39%
2023	N22 Tanjong Bunga	Hng Chee Wey (Gerakan)	4,430	24.33%	Lee Chui Wah (PRM)	518	2.85%	18,390	8,827	62.39%

Parliament of Malaysia
Year	Constituency	Candidate	Votes	Pct	Opponent(s)	Votes	Pct	Ballots cast	Majority	Turnout
2022	P048 Bukit Bendera	Hng Chee Wey (Gerakan)	6,743	10.79%	Syerleena Abdul Rashid (DAP)	49,353	78.98%	63,404	42,610	69.00%
2022	P048 Bukit Bendera	Hng Chee Wey (Gerakan)	6,743	10.79%	Richie Huan Xin Yun (PCM)	5,417	8.67%	63,404	42,610	69.00%
2022	P048 Bukit Bendera	Hng Chee Wey (Gerakan)	6,743	10.79%	Teh Yee Cheu (PRM)	677	1.08%	63,404	42,610	69.00%
2022	P048 Bukit Bendera	Hng Chee Wey (Gerakan)	6,743	10.79%	Razali Mohd Zin (IND)	299	0.48%	63,404	42,610	69.00%
