= Teng Hock Nan =

Malaysian politician

Yang Berbahagia Dato' Teng Hock Nan DSPN
- 丁福南

Member of the Penang State Executive Council
- In office 2004–2008
- Governor: Abdul Rahman Abbas (2004–2008)
- Chief Minister: Koh Tsu Koon
- Portfolio: Local Government, Traffic Management, Information and Community Relations
- Preceded by: Himself (Local Government, Traffic Management); Jahara Hamid (Information); Portfolio established (Community Relations)
- Succeeded by: Chow Kon Yeow (Local Government, Traffic Management); Mohammad Fairus Khairuddin (Information, Community Relations)
- Constituency: Pulau Tikus
- In office 1999–2004
- Governor: Hamdan Sheikh Tahir (1999–2001); Abdul Rahman Abbas (2001–2004)
- Chief Minister: Koh Tsu Koon
- Portfolio: Local Government, Environment and Traffic Management
- Succeeded by: Himeself (Local Government, Traffic Management); Teng Chang Yeow (Environment)
- Constituency: Kebun Bunga

Member of the Penang State Legislative Assembly for Pulau Tikus
- In office 21 March 2004 – 8 March 2008
- Preceded by: new constituency
- Succeeded by: Koay Teng Hai (PR–DAP)
- Majority: 4,026 (2004)

Member of the Penang State Legislative Assembly for Kebun Bunga
- In office 21 October 1990 – 21 March 2004
- Preceded by: Peter Huang (DAP)
- Succeeded by: Quah Kooi Heong (BN–Gerakan)
- Majority: 84 (1990); 5,486 (1995); 3,409 (1999)

Personal details
- Born: 17 April 1945 (age 81) Kedah, Japanese occupation of Malaya
- Party: Parti Gerakan Rakyat Malaysia (Gerakan)
- Other political affiliations: Barisan Nasional (BN) (–2018); Perikatan Nasional (PN) (2021–present)
- Education: Bombay Medical School (MBBS)
- Occupation: Politician
- Profession: Physician

Teng Hock Nan (born 17 April 1945) is a Malaysian politician. He served as Member of the Penang State Executive Council (EXCO) in the Barisan Nasional (BN) state administration under Chief Minister Koh Tsu Koon from 1999 to 2004, Member of the Penang State Legislative Assembly (MLA) for Kebun Bunga from October 1990 to March 2004 and Pulau Tikus from March 2004 to March 2008. He is a member of Parti Gerakan Rakyat Malaysia (Gerakan), a component party of Perikatan Nasional (PN) and formerly BN coalitions.

Teng Hock Nan had served as Chairman of Penang Island Municipal Council. Teng once seen as candidate of Chief Minister of Penang after the 2008 general election alongside his colleague Teng Chang Yeow.

He is currently one of the Board of Director of Penang Chinese Girls Private High School. He also served as Director Of Yayasan Kek Lok Si, Medical Superintendent Of Kek Lok Si Charitable Hospital.

== Election results ==
Penang State Legislative Assembly
Year	Constituency	Candidate	Votes	Pct	Opponent(s)	Votes	Pct	Ballots cast	Majority	Turnout
1986	N21 Kebun Bunga	Teng Hock Nan (Gerakan)	5,172	48.89%	Peter Huang (DAP)	5,227	49.41%	10,802	55	69.53%
1986	N21 Kebun Bunga	Teng Hock Nan (Gerakan)	5,172	48.89%	Ng Teng Kok (SDP)	179	1.70%	10,802	55	69.53%
1990	N21 Kebun Bunga	Teng Hock Nan (Gerakan)	5,927	50.37%	Ho Soon Cheng (DAP)	5,843	49.63%	12,056	84	73.43%
1995	N21 Kebun Bunga	Teng Hock Nan (Gerakan)	10,089	68.67%	Gooi Hock Seng (DAP)	4,603	31.33%	15,049	5,486	72.38%
1999	N21 Kebun Bunga	Teng Hock Nan (Gerakan)	8,551	62.45%	Lim Kit Siang (DAP)	5,142	37.55%	14,195	3,409	68.67%
2004	N25 Pulau Tikus	Teng Hock Nan (Gerakan)	8,613	77.46%	Ong Khan Lee (PKR)	2,507	22.54%	11,425	6,106	66.66%
2008	N25 Pulau Tikus	Teng Hock Nan (Gerakan)	4,935	42.60%	Koay Teng Hai (DAP)	6,649	57.40%	11,766	1,714	70.40%

== Honours ==
- Penang
  - Officer of the Orderof the Defender of State (DSPN) – Dato' (2002)
