= Jason Ong Khan Lee =

Malaysian politician

Yang Berbahagia Dato' Jason Ong Khan Lee DSPN
- 王康立

Member of the Penang State Legislative Assembly for Kebun Bunga
- In office 9 May 2018 – 12 August 2023
- Preceded by: Cheah Kah Peng (PH–PKR)
- Succeeded by: Lee Boon Heng (PH–PKR)
- Majority: 12,597 (2018)
- In office 8 March 2008 – 5 May 2013
- Preceded by: Quah Kooi Heong (BN–Gerakan)
- Succeeded by: Cheah Kah Peng (PR–PKR)
- Majority: 3,125 (2008)

Personal details
- Party: People's Justice Party (PKR)
- Other political affiliations: Pakatan Rakyat (PR) (2008–2015); Pakatan Harapan (PH) (2015–present)
- Occupation: Politician

Jason Ong Khan Lee

Chinese name
- Traditional Chinese: 王康立
- Simplified Chinese: 王康立
- Hanyu Pinyin: Wáng Kāng Lì
- Jyutping: Wong4 Hong1 Laap6
- Hokkien POJ: Ông Khong-li̍p
- Tâi-lô: Ông Khong-li̍p

Jason Ong Khan Lee is a Malaysian politician from PKR. He was the Member of Penang State Legislative Assembly for Kebun Bunga from 2008 to 2013 and from 2018 to 2023 after winning it in the 2008 Penang state election and 2018 Penang state election.

== Election results ==
Penang State Legislative Assembly
Year	Constituency	Candidate	Votes	Pct	Opponent(s)	Votes	Pct	Ballot cast	Majority	Turnout
2004	N25 Pulau Tikus	Ong Khan Lee (PKR)	2,507	22.54%	Teng Hock Nan (Gerakan)	8,613	77.46%	11,425	6,106	66.66%
2008	N24 Kebun Bunga	Ong Khan Lee (PKR)	8,307	60.54%	Quah Kooi Heong (Gerakan)	5,182	37.77%	13,721	3,125	74.34%
2018	N24 Kebun Bunga	Ong Khan Lee (PKR)	14,851	85.24%	Ooi Zhi Yi (Gerakan)	2,254	12.94%	17,422	12,597	81.53%
2018	N24 Kebun Bunga	Ong Khan Lee (PKR)	14,851	85.24%	Wu Kai Min (MUP)	110	0.01%	17,422	12,597	81.53%

== Honours ==
- Penang
  - Officer of the Order of the Defender of State (DSPN) – Dato' (2023)
