= Jelutong (federal constituency) =

Federal constituency of Penang, Malaysia

Jelutong (P050)
Penang constituency

Federal constituency
- Legislature: Dewan Rakyat
- MP: Sanisvara Nethaji Rayer Rajaji Rayer; PH
- Constituency created: 1974
- First contested: 1974
- Last contested: 2022

Demographics
- Population (2020): 113,725
- Electors (2023): 94,313
- Area (km²): 10
- Pop. density (per km²): 11,372.5

Jelutong is a federal constituency in Northeast Penang Island District, Penang, Malaysia, that has been represented in the Dewan Rakyat since 1974.

The federal constituency was created in the 1974 redistribution and is mandated to return a single member to the Dewan Rakyat under the first past the post voting system.

== Demographics ==
https://live.chinapress.com.my/ge15/parliament/PENANG

Ethnic breakdown of Jelutong's electorate as of 2022
1. Chinese (63.1%)
2. Malay (21.1%)
3. Indian (14.9%)
4. Other ethnicities (0.90%)

As of 2020, Jelutong has a population of 113,725 people.

Age breakdown of Jelutong's electorate as of 2022
1. 18-20 (4.16%)
2. 21-29 (15.2%)
3. 30-39 (18.6%)
4. 40-49 (17.6%)
5. 50-59 (16.9%)
6. 60-69 (15.5%)
7. 70-79 (8.54%)
8. 80-89 (2.80%)
9. above 90 (0.63%)
Gender breakdown of Jelutong's electorate as of 2022
1. Male (48.0%)
2. Female (52.0%)

== History ==
=== Polling districts ===
According to the federal gazette issued on 18 July 2023, the Jelutong constituency is divided into 27 polling districts.

State constituency	Polling districts	Code	Location
Datok Keramat (N29)	Jalan York	050/29/01	SMJK Union
Datok Keramat (N29)	Sekolah Free	050/29/02	SMK Penang Free
Datok Keramat (N29)	Taman Sekolah Free	050/29/03	SJK (C) Han Chiang
Datok Keramat (N29)	Taman Abidin	050/29/04	SJK (C) Sum Sun
Datok Keramat (N29)	Jalan Perak	050/29/05	Sekolah Jepun Pulau Pinang
Datok Keramat (N29)	Caunter Hall	050/29/06	SMK Abdullah Munshi
Datok Keramat (N29)	City Stadium	050/29/07	SMK (P) Sri Mutiara
Datok Keramat (N29)	Kampong Makam	050/29/08	SJK (C) Convent Datuk Keramat
Datok Keramat (N29)	Jalan Kajang	050/29/09	SJK (C) Tong Sian
Sungai Pinang (N30)	Sungai Pinang Road	050/30/01	SJK (T) Ramathasar
Sungai Pinang (N30)	City Infitmary	050/30/02	SJK (T) Ramathasar
Sungai Pinang (N30)	Jalan Trusan	050/30/03	SJK (C) Moh Ghee (Pusat)
Sungai Pinang (N30)	West Jelutong	050/30/04	SJK (C) Moh Ghee Cawangan
Sungai Pinang (N30)	Bakau Street	050/30/05	SJK (C) Moh Ghee (Pusat)
Sungai Pinang (N30)	East Jelutong	050/30/06	SK Jelutong
Sungai Pinang (N30)	Jalan Madrasah	050/30/07	SK Jelutong
Sungai Pinang (N30)	Bukit Dumbar	050/30/08	SJK (C) Phei Shin
Batu Lanchang (N31)	Lilitan Hargreaves	050/31/01	SK Jalan Hamilton
Batu Lanchang (N31)	Chemor Lane	050/31/02	SMJK Heng Ee
Batu Lanchang (N31)	Lorong Parit Buntar	050/31/03	SJK (C) Kheng Tean
Batu Lanchang (N31)	Jelutong Road	050/31/04	SJK (C) Beng Teik (Cawangan)
Batu Lanchang (N31)	Panchor Road	050/31/05	SJK (C) Jelutong
Batu Lanchang (N31)	Batu Lanchang	050/31/06	SJK (C) Jelutong
Batu Lanchang (N31)	Solok Batu Lanchang	050/31/07	SMK Jelutong
Batu Lanchang (N31)	Jalan Penaga	050/31/08	SK Jelutong Barat
Batu Lanchang (N31)	Tingkat Jelutong	050/31/09	SMK Jelutong
Batu Lanchang (N31)	Desa Green	050/31/10	SMK Convent Green Lane

=== Representation history ===
Members of Parliament for Jelutong
Parliament	No	Years	Member	Party	Vote Share
Constituency created from Dato' Kramat, Penang Utara and Penang Selatan
4th	P043	1974–1978	Rasiah Rajasingam (ரசியா ராஜசிங்கம்)	BN (GERAKAN)	16,112; 46.45%
5th	P043	1978–1982	Karpal Singh Ram Singh (ਕਰਪਾਲ ਸਿੰਘ)	DAP	23,606; 51.33%
6th	P043	1982–1986	Karpal Singh Ram Singh (ਕਰਪਾਲ ਸਿੰਘ)	DAP	29,099; 55.21%
7th	P046	1986–1990	Karpal Singh Ram Singh (ਕਰਪਾਲ ਸਿੰਘ)	DAP	25,932; 62.09%
8th	P046	1990–1995	Karpal Singh Ram Singh (ਕਰਪਾਲ ਸਿੰਘ)	GR (DAP)	27,426; 60.05%
9th	P049	1995–1999	Karpal Singh Ram Singh (ਕਰਪਾਲ ਸਿੰਘ)	GR (DAP)	21,896; 49.84%
10th	P049	1999–2004	Lee Kah Choon (李家泉)	BN (GERAKAN)	21,491; 50.92%
11th	P050	2004–2008	Lee Kah Choon (李家泉)	BN (GERAKAN)	24,988; 58.79%
12th	P050	2008–2013	Ooi Chuan Aun (黄泉安)	PR (DAP)	30,493; 66.84%
13th	P050	2013–2015	Ooi Chuan Aun (黄泉安)	PR (DAP)	43,211; 71.22%
13th	P050	2015–2018	Ooi Chuan Aun (黄泉安)	PH (DAP)	43,211; 71.22%
14th	P050	2018–2022	Sanisvara Nethaji Rayer (சானிஸ்வர நேதாஜி ரேயர்)	PH (DAP)	50,700; 79.63%
15th	P050	2022–present	Sanisvara Nethaji Rayer (சானிஸ்வர நேதாஜி ரேயர்)	PH (DAP)	50,369; 71.24%

=== State constituency ===
Parliamentary constituency	State constituency						
Parliamentary constituency	1955–1959*	1959–1974	1974–1986	1986–1995	1995–2004	2004–2018	2018–present
Jelutong				Batu Lancang			
Jelutong			Bukit Gelugor				
Jelutong			Datok Keramat				
Jelutong			Sungai Pinang				

=== Historical boundaries ===
State Constiteuncy	Area				
State Constiteuncy	1974	1984	1994	2003	2018
Batu Lancang		Batu Lanchang; Hamilton Road; Perak Line; Perak Road; Taman Jelutong		Batu Lanchang; Hamilton Road; Perak Road; Taman Gelugor; Taman Jelutong	
Bukit Gelugor	Bukit Gelugor; Island Gates; Island Park; Kampung Baru; Seri Delima				
Datok Keramat	Dato Keramat; Dhoby Ghaut; Kebun Lama; Taman Free School; York Road	Barrack Road; Dhoby Ghaut; Kebun Lama; Taman Free School; York Road	Dato Keramat; Dhoby Ghaut; Kebun Lama; Taman Free School; York Road		
Sungai Pinang	Lines Road; Jelutong Road; Panchor Road; Sungai Pinang			Jelutong; Kampung Ban Liow; Panchor Road; Sri Pinang; Sungai Pinang	

=== Current state assembly members ===
No.	State Constituency	Member	Coalition (Party)
N29	Datok Keramat	Jagdeep Singh Deo	PH (DAP)
N30	Sungai Pinang	Lim Siew Khim	PH (DAP)
N31	Batu Lancang	Ong Ah Teong	PH (DAP)

=== Local governments & postcodes ===
No.	State Constituency	Local Government	Postcode
N29	Dato Keramat	Penang Island City Council	10000, 10150, 10460, 11400, Penang; 11500 Ayer Itam; 11600 Jelutong
N30	Sungai Pinang	Penang Island City Council	10000, 10150, 10460, 11400, Penang; 11500 Ayer Itam; 11600 Jelutong
N31	Batu Lancang	Penang Island City Council	10000, 10150, 10460, 11400, Penang; 11500 Ayer Itam; 11600 Jelutong

== Election results ==
Malaysian general election, 2022
Party	Candidate	Votes	%	∆%
PH	Sanisvara Nethaji Rayer Rajaji Rayer	50,369	71.24	▲71.24
PN	Baljit Singh Jigiri Singh	11,765	16.64	▲16.64
BN	Loganathan Thoraisamy	7,387	10.45	▼9.22
Independent	Yaacab Noor	480	0.68	▲0.68
Heritage	Lim Huat Poh	442	0.63	▲0.63
Parti Rakyat Malaysia	Koh Swe Yong	264	0.37	▲0.37
Total valid votes		70,707	100.00	
Total rejected ballots		858		
Unreturned ballots		188		
Turnout		71,753	75.23	▼8.67
Registered electors		93,989		
Majority		38,604	54.60	▼5.36
PH hold		Swing		
Source(s) https://lom.agc.gov.my/ilims/upload/portal/akta/outputp/1753273/PUB609%20(2022).pdf

Malaysian general election, 2018
Party	Candidate	Votes	%	∆%
PKR	Sanisvara Nethaji Rayer Rajaji Rayer	50,700	79.63	▲79.63
BN	Baljit Singh Jigiri Singh	12,529	19.67	▼9.11
BERSAMA	Tan Sim Bee	437	0.69	▲0.69
Total valid votes		63,666	100.00	
Total rejected ballots		720		
Unreturned ballots		198		
Turnout		64,584	83.90	▼2.72
Registered electors		76,991		
Majority		38,171	59.96	▲17.52
PKR hold		Swing		
Source(s) "His Majesty's Government Gazette - Notice of Contested Election, Parliament for the State of Penang [P.U. (B) 236/2018]" (PDF). Attorney General's Chambers of Malaysia. 3 May 2018. "Federal Government Gazette - Results of Contested Election and Statements of the Poll after the Official Addition of Votes, Parliamentary Constituencies for the State of Penang [P.U. (B) 310/2018]" (PDF). Attorney General's Chambers of Malaysia. 28 May 2018.

Malaysian general election, 2013
Party	Candidate	Votes	%	∆%
DAP	Ooi Chuan Aun	43,211	71.22	▲4.38
BN	Ng Fook On	17,461	28.78	▼2.45
Total valid votes		60,672	100.00	
Total rejected ballots		769		
Unreturned ballots		274		
Turnout		61,715	86.62	▲10.77
Registered electors		71,247		
Majority		25,750	42.44	▲6.83
DAP hold		Swing		
Source(s) "Federal Government Gazette - Notice of Contested Election, Parliament for the State of Penang [P.U. (B) 173/2013]" (PDF). Attorney General's Chambers of Malaysia. 26 April 2013. "Federal Government Gazette - Results of Contested Election and Statements of the Poll after the Official Addition of Votes, Parliamentary Constituencies for the State of Penang [P.U. (B) 214/2013]" (PDF). Attorney General's Chambers of Malaysia. 22 May 2013. Archived from the original (PDF) on 2019-03-22.

Malaysian general election, 2008
Party	Candidate	Votes	%	∆%
DAP	Ooi Chuan Aun	30,493	66.84	▲25.63
BN	Thor Teong See	14,247	31.23	▼27.56
Independent	Badrul Zaman P. S. Md. Zakariah	882	1.93	▲1.93
Total valid votes		45,622	100.00	
Total rejected ballots		743		
Unreturned ballots		41		
Turnout		46,406	75.85	▲2.85
Registered electors		61,181		
Majority		16,246	35.61	▲18.03
DAP gain from BN		Swing		?

Malaysian general election, 2004
Party	Candidate	Votes	%	∆%
BN	Lee Kah Choon	24,988	58.79	▲7.82
DAP	Gooi Seong Kin	17,518	41.21	▼7.82
Total valid votes		42,506	100.00	
Total rejected ballots		1,002		
Unreturned ballots		30		
Turnout		43,538	73.00	▲0.18
Registered electors		59,641		
Majority		7,470	17.58	▲15.74
BN hold		Swing		

Malaysian general election, 1999
Party	Candidate	Votes	%	∆%
BN	Lee Kah Choon	21,491	50.92	▲1.73
DAP	Karpal Singh Ram Singh	20,716	49.08	▼0.76
Total valid votes		42,207	100.00	
Total rejected ballots		1,012		
Unreturned ballots		20		
Turnout		43,239	72.82	▼2.23
Registered electors		55,562		
Majority		775	1.84	▲1.19
BN gain from DAP		Swing		?

Malaysian general election, 1995
Party	Candidate	Votes	%	∆%
DAP	Karpal Singh Ram Singh	21,896	49.84	▼10.21
BN	Rhina Bhar @ Rani Raj Pal	21,613	49.19	▲9.24
PBS	Lim Cheak Kow	425	0.97	▲0.97
Total valid votes		43,934	100.00	
Total rejected ballots		914		
Unreturned ballots		74		
Turnout		44,922	75.05	▲0.18
Registered electors		59,856		
Majority		283	0.65	▼19.45
DAP hold		Swing		

Malaysian general election, 1990
Party	Candidate	Votes	%	∆%
DAP	Karpal Singh Ram Singh	27,426	60.05	▼2.04
BN	Ooi Ean Kwong	18,248	39.95	▲2.04
Total valid votes		45,674	100.00	
Total rejected ballots		841		
Unreturned ballots		0		
Turnout		46,515	74.87	▲3.53
Registered electors		62,126		
Majority		9,178	20.10	▼4.18
DAP hold		Swing		

Malaysian general election, 1986
Party	Candidate	Votes	%	∆%
DAP	Karpal Singh Ram Singh	25,932	62.09	▲6.88
BN	Lim Boo Chang	15,833	37.91	▼6.88
Total valid votes		41,765	100.00	
Total rejected ballots		958		
Unreturned ballots		0		
Turnout		42,723	71.34	▼4.43
Registered electors		59,890		
Majority		10,099	24.28	▲13.86
DAP hold		Swing		

Malaysian general election, 1982
Party	Candidate	Votes	%	∆%
DAP	Karpal Singh Ram Singh	29,099	55.21	▲3.88
BN	Ooi Ean Kwong	23,603	44.79	▲1.34
Total valid votes		52,702	100.00	
Total rejected ballots		1,168		
Unreturned ballots		0		
Turnout		53,870	75.77	
Registered electors		71,093		
Majority		5,496	10.42	▲2.54
DAP hold		Swing		

Malaysian general election, 1978
Party	Candidate	Votes	%	∆%
DAP	Karpal Singh Ram Singh	23,606	51.33	▲22.06
BN	Lee Him	19,985	43.45	▼3.00
SDP	Yeap Ghim Guan	2,401	5.22	▲5.22
Total valid votes		45,992	100.00	
Total rejected ballots		1,316		
Unreturned ballots		0		
Turnout		47,308	78.52	▼4.56
Registered electors		60,248		
Majority		3,621	7.88	▼9.30
DAP gain from BN		Swing		?

Malaysian general election, 1974
Party	Candidate	Votes	%
BN	Rasiah Rajasingam	16,112	46.45
DAP	Gooi Hock Seng @ Goi Hock Seng	10,152	29.27
PEKEMAS	V. David	6,955	20.05
Parti Rakyat Malaysia	Teh Eng Siang	1,467	4.23
Total valid votes		34,686	100.00
Total rejected ballots		874	
Unreturned ballots		0	
Turnout		35,560	83.08
Registered electors		44,594	
Majority		5,960	17.18
This was a new constituency created.
