= Lin Xiuqin =

Lin Xiuqin (林秀琴) is a human name, may refer to:

- Lin Hsiu-Chin (born 1978), Taiwanese entertainer, Chen Chih-yuan’s wife
- Lim Siew Khim, Malaysian politician
