= Teh Yee Cheu =

Malaysian politician

- 郑雨周

Member of the Penang State Legislative Assembly for Tanjong Bunga
- In office 8 March 2008 – 9 May 2018
- Preceded by: Koh Tsu Koon (BN–Gerakan)
- Succeeded by: Zairil Khir Johari (PH–DAP)
- Majority: 1,935 (2008); 5,515 (2013)

Personal details
- Party: Democratic Action Party (DAP) (–2018); Socialist Party of Malaysia (PSM) (2018–2021); Parti Rakyat Malaysia (PRM) (2021–present)
- Other political affiliations: Pakatan Rakyat (PR) (2008–2015); Pakatan Harapan (PH) (2015–2018)
- Occupation: Politician

Teh Yee Cheu is a Malaysian politician who served as Member of the Penang State Legislative Assembly (MLA) for Tanjong Bunga from March 2008 to May 2018.

Teh Yee Cheu announced his exit from the Democratic Action Party (DAP) on 7 April 2018. He contested the 2018 general election under the Socialist Party of Malaysia (PSM) banner. In June 2021, he quit Socialist Party of Malaysia. In December, he appied to join the Parti Rakyat Malaysia. On 23 July 2022, Teh Yee Cheu officially appointed as Parti Rakyat Malaysia Penang State Chairman.

He later contest 2022 general election and 2023 state election under the Parti Rakyat Malaysia (PRM) banner respectively, but was defeated.

== Election results ==
Penang State Legislative Assembly
Year	Constituency	Candidate	Votes	Pct	Opponent(s)	Votes	Pct	Ballots cast	Majority	Turnout
2008	N22 Tanjong Bunga	Teh Yee Cheu (DAP)	7,021	57.99%	Chia Loong Thye (Gerakan)	5,086	42.01%	12,359	1,935	73.09%
2013	N22 Tanjong Bunga	Teh Yee Cheu (DAP)	11,033	66.53%	Chia Kwang Chye (Gerakan)	5,518	33.28%	16,777	5,515	83.60%
2013	N22 Tanjong Bunga	Teh Yee Cheu (DAP)	11,033	66.53%	Beh Seong Leng (IND)	33	0.20%	16,777	5,515	83.60%
2018	N30 Sungai Pinang	Teh Yee Cheu (PSM)	223	0.98%	Lim Siew Khim (DAP)	15,362	67.66%	22,704	10,388	84.35%
2018	N30 Sungai Pinang	Teh Yee Cheu (PSM)	223	0.98%	Ng Fook On (Gerakan)	4,974	21.91%	22,704	10,388	84.35%
2018	N30 Sungai Pinang	Teh Yee Cheu (PSM)	223	0.98%	Yacoob Omar (PAS)	1,575	6.94%	22,704	10,388	84.35%
2018	N30 Sungai Pinang	Teh Yee Cheu (PSM)	223	0.98%	Mohamed Yacoob (IND)	119	0.52%	22,704	10,388	84.35%
2018	N30 Sungai Pinang	Teh Yee Cheu (PSM)	223	0.98%	Tan Sim Bee (MUP)	79	0.35%	22,704	10,388	84.35%
2023	N23 Air Putih	Teh Yee Cheu (PRM)	473	4.16%	Lim Guan Eng (DAP)	8,996	85.63%	10,583	7,923	68.85%
2023	N23 Air Putih	Teh Yee Cheu (PRM)	473	4.16%	Koh Cheng Ann (Gerakan)	1,073	10.21%	10,583	7,923	68.85%

Parliament of Malaysia
Year	Constituency	Candidate	Votes	Pct	Opponent(s)	Votes	Pct	Ballots cast	Majority	Turnout
2022	P048 Bukit Bendera	Teh Yee Cheu (PRM)	677	1.08%	Syerleena Abdul Rashid (DAP)	49,353	78.98%	63,404	42,610	69.0%
2022	P048 Bukit Bendera	Teh Yee Cheu (PRM)	677	1.08%	Hng Chee Wey (Gerakan)	6,743	10.79%	63,404	42,610	69.0%
2022	P048 Bukit Bendera	Teh Yee Cheu (PRM)	677	1.08%	Richie Huan Xin Yun (PCM)	5,417	8.67%	63,404	42,610	69.0%
2022	P048 Bukit Bendera	Teh Yee Cheu (PRM)	677	1.08%	Razali Mohd Zin (IND)	299	0.48%	63,404	42,610	69.0%
