= RSN Rayer =

Malaysian politician and lawyer

Yang Berhormat Tuan RSN Rayer MP

Member of the Malaysian Parliament for Jelutong
- Incumbent
- Assumed office 9 May 2018
- Preceded by: Jeff Ooi Chuan Aun (PR–DAP)
- Majority: 38,171 (2018); 38,604 (2022)

Member of the Penang State Legislative Assembly for Seri Delima
- In office 8 March 2008 – 9 May 2018
- Preceded by: Koay Kar Huah (BN–MCA)
- Succeeded by: Syerleena Abdul Rashid (PH–DAP)
- Majority: 2,128 (2008); 9,277 (2013)

Personal details
- Born: Sanisvara Nethaji Rayer s/o Rajaji Rayer; 11 June 1971 (age 55) Alor Setar, Kedah, Malaysia
- Citizenship: Malaysian
- Party: Democratic Action Party (DAP)
- Other political affiliations: Pakatan Rakyat (PR) (2008–2015); Pakatan Harapan (PH) (since 2015)
- Education: University of London
- Occupation: Politician
- Profession: Lawyer
- Website: rsnrayer.blogspot.com

Sanisvara Nethaji Rayer s/o Rajaji Rayer (Tamil: ஆர். எஸ். என். ராயர்) (born 11 June 1971) is a Malaysian politician and lawyer who has served as the Member of Parliament (MP) for Jelutong since May 2018. He served as Member of the Penang State Legislative Assembly (MLA) for Seri Delima from March 2008 to May 2018. He is a member of the Democratic Action Party (DAP), a component party of the Pakatan Harapan (PH) and formerly Pakatan Rakyat (PR) coalition. He currently serves as the Chairman of the Penang Hindu Endowments Board. As the Jelutong MP, he is known of his involvement in heated arguments and exchanges with the opposing MPs during the meetings in Parliament.

== Politics ==
Rayer's political career began in 1988 after a short stint working for Karpal Singh for his general election campaign. Subsequently, he joined Democratic Action Party (DAP) and went on to contest and be elected twice as the state assemblyman for Seri Delima in 2008 and 2013 general elections. In the 2018 general election, Rayer contested the Jelutong parliamentary seat and was elected as a member of parliament.

=== Criticism of Najib Razak ===
On 10 May 2019, Rayer urged former prime minister Najib Razak to show some remorse for what happened while he was prime minister instead of going around calling himself “Bossku”.

On 17 November 2021, Rayer claimed that there was a video on social media allegedly showing Najib signing his autograph on a motorcycle while campaigning in the state polls. He offered to provide the video to Khairy, urging that action be taken against Najib for repeatedly flouting standard operating procedures (SOP).

During the Debate on Budget 2022 at the Committee Stage, Rayer had asked Finance Minister Tengku Zafrul Aziz why Najib has yet to be blacklisted by the Inland Revenue Board (IRB) and allowed to travel to Singapore despite the outstanding tax arrears owed to the government. Rayer was ejected from the Dewan Rakyat for ignoring instructions from deputy speaker Rashid Hasnon.

On 2 March 2022, Rayer has been ejected from the Dewan Rakyat after he repeatedly interjected Najib during the latter's debate of the royal address.

== Legal career ==
Rayer was admitted to the Malaysian bar in 1995 after completing his pupillage in the chambers of Karpal Singh & Co. Currently, he has his own law firm, R. Nethaji Rayer & Co. in Georgetown, Penang.

== Controversy ==
=== "UMNO celaka" remarks ===
Rayer drew flak from UMNO-BN supporters for his controversial "UMNO celaka" (damned UMNO) remarks referring to three assemblymen who alleged that DAP instigated the May 1969 riot in a state assembly sitting in Penang State Legislative Assembly. Following his remark, a protest was staged by Penang Perkasa Youth and several Penang UMNO members in front of the state assembly hall. They stormed into the state assembly hall by crashing through the gates of the building. They have also demanded apology from R.S.N. Rayer. However, Rayer refused to apologise.

Rayer was arrested in a sedition dragnet for his "UMNO celaka" remark under the Sedition Act and was charged on 27 August 2014. However, the Sessions Court acquitted and discharged R.S.N. Rayer. The court held that the words that Rayer had used in reference to UMNO did not amount to sedition as alleged.

=== TV3 Broadcast License ===
On 11 May 2018, just days after being elected a Member of Parliament of Jelutong on 9 May 2018, Rayer again drew widespread criticism, this time from ordinary Malaysian citizens, for posting a comment on Facebook, that TV3, a Malaysian TV network, should have its broadcast license revoked. This comment was in blatant contradiction to Pakatan Harapan's election manifesto which specifically promises to guarantee media freedom, and was swiftly renounced by Pakatan Harapan.

=== 'Kepala Bapak' remarks ===
On 5 August 2018, DAP's RSN Rayer, sparked controversy in the Dewan Rakyat when he used the insult ‘kepala bapak’ during the sitting. He used the phrase when his attempt to raise an additional question was interrupted by Datuk Seri Hamzah Zainudin. Hamzah had criticised Rayer for trying to ask Deputy International Trade and Industry Minister Dr Ong Kian Ming whether the 1Malaysia Development Bhd (1MDB) issue had triggered outflow of foreign investments from Malaysia.

Rayer had previously used the insult during another Parliamentary sitting. On that meeting, he was raising an additional request to the Deputy Home Affairs Minister Azis Jamman, over the poor conditions spreading within police barracks in Penang. He then criticized on how the previous Barisan Nasional government failed to assist in upgrading those damaged or poorly built police barracks, pointing out that their reason of not doing so as a result of not having the enough financial resources is pointless as former Prime Minister Najib Razak's wife, Rosmah Mansor, was able to freely import jewelries into the country without even paying GST.

He then uttered the word right before assuming his seat and this caused a stir between him two Barisan Nasional MPs, Mahdzir Khalid and Noh Omar, who were ordering him to withdraw the word. This was eventually settled when Deputy Speaker, Nga Kor Ming ordered Rayer to retract.

=== RSN Rayer's dispute with Perlis Mufti ===
Recently, a controversy arose between RSN Rayer, the Member of Parliament for Jelutong, and Datuk Dr. Mohd Asri Zainul Abidin, the Mufti of Perlis, regarding the participation of Dr. Zakir Naik in a religious event in Perlis. Dr. Zakir Naik, a preacher who was previously barred from delivering public lectures in Malaysia since 2019, was reported to have spoken at the event. RSN Rayer questioned the authorities about his appearance, given the previous ban on his public speeches.

In response, Dr. Mohd Asri defended Zakir Naik's participation, stating that he had been granted official credentials to teach Islam in Perlis. However, the Mufti's remarks included references to Hindu religious practices, particularly the sacred ash ("vibhuti") applied on the forehead, which RSN Rayer found offensive.

RSN Rayer expressed that he felt insulted by the remarks and demanded an apology from Dr. Asri. He clarified that, as a Member of Parliament, it was his responsibility to raise public concerns and that he had no intention of interfering in Islamic affairs.

However, Dr. Asri denied any intent to insult and argued that his statement had been misinterpreted. He also questioned Rayer's understanding of the Malay language, further fueling the dispute.

== Election results ==
Penang State Legislative Assembly
| Year | Constituency | Candidate | Votes | Pct | Opponent(s) | Votes | Pct | Ballots cast | Majority | Turnout |
|---|---|---|---|---|---|---|---|---|---|---|
| 2008 | N32 Seri Delima | Sanisvara Nethaji Rayer (DAP) | 8,402 | 57.20% | Loh Nam Hooi (MCA) | 6,274 | 42.80% | 14,915 | 2,128 | 72.70% |
| 2013 | N32 Seri Delima | Sanisvara Nethaji Rayer (DAP) | 14,478 | 73.60% | Low Joo Hiap (MCA) | 5,201 | 26.40% | 19,944 | 9,277 | 83.70% |

Parliament of Malaysia
| Year | Constituency | Candidate | Votes | Pct | Opponent(s) | Votes | Pct | Ballots cast | Majority | Turnout |
|---|---|---|---|---|---|---|---|---|---|---|
| 2018 | P050 Jelutong | Sanisvara Nethaji Rayer (DAP) | 50,700 | 79.63% | Baljit Singh Jigiri Singh (Gerakan) | 12,529 | 19.67% | 64,584 | 38,171 | 83.90% |
| 2018 | P050 Jelutong | Sanisvara Nethaji Rayer (DAP) | 50,700 | 79.63% | Tan Sim Bee (MUP) | 437 | 0.69% | 64,584 | 38,171 | 83.90% |
| 2022 | P050 Jelutong | Sanisvara Nethaji Rayer (DAP) | 50,369 | 71.24% | Baljit Singh Jigiri Singh (Gerakan) | 11,765 | 16.64% | 70,707 | 38,604 | 75,23% |
| 2022 | P050 Jelutong | Sanisvara Nethaji Rayer (DAP) | 50,369 | 71.24% | Loganathan Thoraisamy (IPF) | 7,387 | 10.45% | 70,707 | 38,604 | 75,23% |
| 2022 | P050 Jelutong | Sanisvara Nethaji Rayer (DAP) | 50,369 | 71.24% | Yaccab Noor (IND) | 580 | 0.68% | 70,707 | 38,604 | 75,23% |
| 2022 | P050 Jelutong | Sanisvara Nethaji Rayer (DAP) | 50,369 | 71.24% | Lim Huat Poh (WARISAN) | 442 | 0.63% | 70,707 | 38,604 | 75,23% |
| 2022 | P050 Jelutong | Sanisvara Nethaji Rayer (DAP) | 50,369 | 71.24% | Koh Swe Yong (PRM) | 264 | 0.37% | 70,707 | 38,604 | 75,23% |

== Honours ==
=== Honours of Malaysia ===
- Malaysia
  - Recipient of the 17th Yang di-Pertuan Agong Installation Medal (2024)

== See also ==
- Seri Delima (state constituency)
- Jelutong (federal constituency)
- List of Malaysian politicians of Indian origin
