= Kumaresan Aramugam =

Malaysian politician

Yang Berhormat Tuan Kumaresan Aramugam MLA
- குமரேசன் ஆரம்முகம்

Member of the Penang State Legislative Assembly for Batu Uban
- Incumbent
- Assumed office 9 May 2018
- Preceded by: Jayabalan Thambyappa (PR–PKR)
- Majority: 17,273 (2018); 16,708 (2023)

Personal details
- Born: Kumaresan a/l Aramugam Batu Gajah, Perak
- Citizenship: Malaysian
- Party: People's Justice Party (PKR)
- Other political affiliations: Pakatan Harapan (PH)
- Education: SMK Sultan Yussuf; Universiti Sains Malaysia
- Occupation: Politician

Kumaresan a/l Aramugam is a Malaysian politician who served as Member of the Penang State Legislative Assembly (MLA) for Batu Uban since May 2018. He is a member of the People's Justice Party (PKR), a component party of Pakatan Harapan (PH).

== Education ==
He is from Batu Gajah, Perak. He studied in SMK Sultan Yussuf and got his Bachelor of Management degree from Universiti Sains Malaysia.

When he was studying in USM, he was active in campus activities and was the Director of Publicity of USM Indian Cultural Association. He was interned at the office of Sim Tze Tzin, Member of Parliament for Bayan Baru.

== Early career ==
He was given the role of coordinator of the PKR Citizenship Program in Penang. Together with lawyer N. Surendran, he established a task force to help stateless people and children to get their citizenship and to get to school in Penang. He also served the Chairman of Malaysia Indian Youth Council and the Chairman of Hindu Youth Organisation in Bayan Baru.

He then was appointed as a member of Penang Island City Council for four terms from 2014 to 2018. He is currently the Vice President of PKR Penang State Leadership Council and Chief of PKR Bayan Baru Youth wing. He was the Secretary of PKR Bayan Baru branch from 2013 to 2018 and a member of the PKR Youth Executive council at national level from 2014 to 2018.

== State assemblyman ==
In the 2018 Penang state election, Kumaresan was selected to contest the Batu Uban state seat. He was elected to the Penang State Legislative Assembly as the Batu Uban MLA for the first term after defeating H'ng Chee Wey of BN, Vikneswaran Muniandy of PAS, Teoh Kok Siang of MUP, and Teoh Kean Liang of PFP by a majority of 17,273 votes.

In March 2021, he lodged a police report after a social media user threatened to kill him, claiming that Kumaresan and his party were not doing enough to help the people.

Kumaresan was nominated to defend his seat in the 2023 Penang state election. He was elected for a second term after defeating Mok Kok On of PN and Lee Kim Noor of MUDA. He had a slightly reduced majority of 16,708.

In May 2025, he was vocal about his support for former MP Nurul Izzah Anwar to take over as PKR deputy president from incumbent Rafizi Ramli. The next year Kumaresan called for Rafizi to quit the party, saying that the defeated former leader had become arrogant and was undermining the party from within.

== Election result ==
Penang State Legislative Assembly
Year	Constituency	Candidate	Votes	Pct	Opponent(s)	Votes	Pct	Ballots cast	Majority	Turnout
2018	N35 Batu Uban	Kumaresan Aramugam (PKR)	21,079	80.43%	Hng Chee Wey (Gerakan)	3,806	14.52%	26,523	17,273	83.08%
2018	N35 Batu Uban	Kumaresan Aramugam (PKR)	21,079	80.43%	Vikneswaran Muniandy (PAS)	1,176	4.49%	26,523	17,273	83.08%
2018	N35 Batu Uban	Kumaresan Aramugam (PKR)	21,079	80.43%	Teoh Kok Siang (MUP)	116	0.44%	26,523	17,273	83.08%
2018	N35 Batu Uban	Kumaresan Aramugam (PKR)	21,079	80.43%	Teoh Kean Liang (PFP)	32	0.12%	26,523	17,273	83.08%
2023	N35 Batu Uban	Kumaresan Aramugam (PKR)	22,773	76.83%	Mok Kok On (Gerakan)	6,065	20.46%	29,641	16,708	68.41%
2023	N35 Batu Uban	Kumaresan Aramugam (PKR)	22,773	76.83%	Lee Kim Noor (MUDA)	803	2.71%	29,641	16,708	68.41%
