= Lee Boon Heng =

Malaysian politician

Yang Berhormat Tuan Lee Boon Heng MLA
- 李文兴

Member of the Penang State Legislative Assembly for Kebun Bunga
- Incumbent
- Assumed office 12 August 2023
- Preceded by: Jason Ong Khan Lee (PH–PKR)
- Majority: 12,955 (2023)

Personal details
- Born: Lee Boon Heng
- Citizenship: Malaysian
- Party: People's Justice Party (PKR)
- Other political affiliations: Pakatan Rakyat (PR) (2013–2015); Pakatan Harapan (PH) (2015–present)
- Occupation: Politician

Lee Boon Heng is a Malaysian politician and journalist who served as Member of the Penang State Legislative Assembly (MLA for Kebun Bunga. He is a member of the People's Justice Party (PKR), a component party of Pakatan Harapan (PH).

Lee holds a Bachelor's degree in Banking and Finance (Honours).

== Early career ==
Before entering politics, Lee worked as a senior journalist at Guang Ming Daily from 2008 to 2013.

== Political career ==
He ventured into politics in 2013 and has since held several key positions, including Special Officer to YB Sim Tze Tzin at the Bayan Baru Parliamentary Service Centre (2013-2018) and Chief of Staff to the Pantai Jerejak Service Centre (2018-2022). Within PKR Penang's leadership structure, Lee serves as Deputy Director of Strategy 1.

== Election results ==
Penang State Legislative Assembly
Year	Constituency	Candidate	Votes	Pct	Opponent(s)	Votes	Pct	Ballots cast	Majority	Turnout
2023	N24 Kebun Bunga	Lee Boon Heng (PKR)	14,159	87.80%	Tan Zhen Zune (Gerakan)	1,204	7.50%	16,273	12,955	66.33%
2023	N24 Kebun Bunga	Lee Boon Heng (PKR)	14,159	87.80%	Razalif Mohamad Zain (IND)	757	4.70%	16,273	12,955	66.33%
