= Ahirudin Attan =

Malaysian journalist

Yang Berbahagia Datuk Ahirudin Attan PMW KMN
- اهيرودين عطان
- Born: 20 December 1961 (age 64); Lubok Cina, Melaka, Federation of Malaya (present-day Malaysia)
- Education: Universiti Teknologi MARA (UiTM)
- Occupations: Media practitioner, journalist, blogger
- Years active: 1985–present
- Children: 3
- Website: www.rockybru.com.my

Datuk Ahirudin bin Attan (born 20 December 1961) also known as Rocky Bru is a Malaysian blogger, journalist and former editor of several New Straits Times Press (NSTP) publications, including the Business Times, The Malay Mail and The Sunday Mail. He currently runs a blog, dubbed Rocky's Bru, and resides in Kuala Lumpur. He also runs a podcast and serves as Group Advisor to Big Boom Media (BBM) Sdn Bhd, a digital media company based in Kuala Lumpur.

== Journalism ==
Ahirudin's first foray into journalism was as a journalist for the Business Times in 1985, after graduating from Institut Teknologi MARA (now Universiti Teknologi MARA or UiTM). In 1992, he served as the group's London correspondent and furthered his studies in Cardiff in 1993, taking up a course in Advanced Journalism. Ahirudin was appointed Editor of the Business Times in 1997 and remained so until he was appointed Acting Editor of The Malay Mail on 16 October 2001. Following a restructuring of the news desk, he was reappointed as the Executive Editor of both the Malay Mail and Sunday Mail on 1 May 2004.

On 13 February 2006, Ahirudin resigned from his editorial position as the newspaper was revamped to cater to younger readerships. Ahirudin further departed from the New Straits Times Press in May 2006, amid speculation that included a "run-in with the present head honchos in the organisation." Ahirudin had been with the NSTP for 21 years.

Ahirudin was the President of the National Press Club from 2003 to 31 March 2007, and was succeeded by Mokhtar Hussain, his brother, and remained as its adviser until March 2009. He is also an Editorial Consultant, and columnist.

== Blogging ==
In May 2006, Ahirudin started Rocky's Bru, a Blogger.com-based blog centred primarily on journalism, mass media and politics.

Ahirudin's blog has garnered sufficient attention by the NSTP that it was blocked from NSTP offices and branches nationwide within two weeks after the blog was formed, and has prompted the group to launch a lawsuit against him, alongside blogger Jeff Ooi, on 11 January 2007, for libel. As of March 2008, the suit is in progress.

On 6 April 2007, Ahirudin was appointed the President of the National Bloggers Alliance, a newly formed group aimed at protecting the rights of Malaysian bloggers and promoting responsible blogging.

== Jeff Ooi ==
Ahirudin has developed a relatively healthy friendship with Jeff Ooi. However, Ahirudin has stated in a press conference on 23 January 2007 that he has previously engaged Ooi in a "healthy" exchange of words:

"There was name calling (by the blog readers), [Ooi] used his blog space to criticise and I used my column in the [New] Sunday Times to respond. Had it gone on and on it would've been a healthy debate."

== Personal life ==
Ahirudin was born in Lubok Cina, Melaka. He is a father of three children, a son and two daughters. One of his children is Ahirine, who also follows his footsteps as a media practitioner as well as an actress.

== Honours ==
- Malaysia
  - Officer of the Order of the Defender of the Realm (KMN) (2001)
- Federal Territory (Malaysia)
  - Commander of the Order of the Territorial Crown (PMW) – Datuk (2010)
