= Joshua Woo Sze Zeng =

Malaysian politician

Yang Berhormat Tuan Joshua Woo Sze Zeng MLA
- 胡智胜

Member of the Penang State Legislative Assembly for Pulau Tikus
- Incumbent
- Assumed office 12 August 2023
- Preceded by: Chris Lee Chun Kit (PH–DAP)
- Majority: 9,769 (2023)

State Publicity Secretary of the Democratic Action Party of Penang
- Incumbent
- Assumed office 22 September 2024
- Assistant: Soon Lip Chee
- Secretary-General: Anthony Loke Siew Fook
- State Chairman: Steven Sim Chee Keong
- Preceded by: Steven Sim Chee Keong

Personal details
- Born: Joshua Woo Sze Zeng; 3 March 1982 (age 44) Penang Adventist Hospital, Pulau Tikus, Penang, Malaysia
- Citizenship: Malaysian
- Party: Democratic Action Party (DAP)
- Other political affiliations: Pakatan Harapan (PH)
- Education: DISTED College; Sunway University; Universiti Sains Malaysia
- Occupation: Politician

Joshua Woo Sze Zeng

Chinese name
- Traditional Chinese: 胡智勝
- Simplified Chinese: 胡智胜
Transcriptions
Standard Mandarin
- Hanyu Pinyin: Hú Zhìshèng

Joshua Woo Sze Zeng (simplified Chinese: 胡智胜; traditional Chinese: 胡智勝; pinyin: Hú Zhìshèng; born 3 March 1982) is a Malaysian politician who has served as Member of the Penang State Legislative Assembly (MLA) for Pulau Tikus since August 2023. He is a member of the Democratic Action Party (DAP), a component party of the Pakatan Harapan (PH) coalition. He has also served as the State Publicity Secretary of DAP of Penang since September 2024.

== Early life ==
Woo was born in Penang Adventist Hospital, Pulau Tikus, but moved to Bukit Mertajam when he was 2. He grew up in Taman Sri Rambai, Bukit Mertajam before he left the country to work in Hong Kong, Australia, and Singapore.

== Education ==
Woo holds two master's degrees: Master of Sustainable Development Management from Sunway University's Jeffrey Sachs Center on Sustainable Development and Master of Communication from Universiti Sains Malaysia.

== Early career ==
Woo worked in Hong Kong, Australia, and Singapore for 13 years before returning to Malaysia in 2015.

== Political career ==
Woo joined DAP in April 2008 at the invitation of Steven Sim Chee Keong, who later became the Member of Parliament for Bukit Mertajam in 2013. Woo relocated back to Penang from Singapore in 2015 to join Steven Sim as his special officer (2015 – 2016).

He served as the Secretary of DAP Jalan Tembikai branch and Bukit Mertajam DAP Youth Chief (2016–2017). He was appointed as a councillor of the Seberang Perai City Council from 2016 to 2018.

Subsequently, Woo worked at the DAP Penang headquarters (2018 – 2020) before joining the Penang Infrastructure Corporation with secondment as special officer to the Penang State Executive Councillor (EXCO) for Infrastructure, Transport, and Digital, Zairil Khir Johari. Woo was appointed as the Publicity Secretary of the influential DAP Penang State Committee (Jawatankuasa Negeri DAP Pulau Pinang) for the term of 2024–2027.

He is known for his advocacy of urban redevelopment, transit-oriented development, and climate change adaptation projects such as Penang's Silicon Island, the Light Rail Transit (LRT), and multi-method flood mitigation.

== Participation in non-governmental organizations (NGOs) ==
Woo is the advisor of Generasi Penang, a non-governmental organization which aims to provide more opportunities for Penang youth . He is also the founding member of the Sustainable Malaysia Association (SMA), which aims to advocate for social, ecological and economic development.

== Advocacy for sustainable development ==
In contrast to environmentalists who are anti-development, Woo advocates for balanced development that prioritises the triple bottom line of sustainability, which are the people, planet, and prosperity. His views are influenced by the work on economic growth by Daniel Susskind, Research Professor at King's College London and Senior Research Associate at Oxford University.

He perceives projects such as the reclamation of Silicon Island as example of sustainable development as it imposes strict mitigation measures through the social impact management plan and the PSR ecology off-set master plan that addresses concerns about fishermen's welfare and marine ecology.

Furthermore, land reclamation is recognised by the United Nations Intergovernmental Panel on Climate Change (IPCC) as an advanced strategy for addressing rising sea levels. In Chapter 4 of IPCC's Special Report on the Ocean and Cryosphere in a Changing Climate, under the section 'Responding to Sea Level Rise', it is stated that, "land reclamation is mature and effective technology and can provide predictable levels of safety."

Woo is a strong advocate of transit-oriented development that is based on public transport system that does not share road space with other modes of mobility such as cars, motorcycles, and bicycles. Therefore, he argues fervently for an elevated Light Rail Transit for Penang instead of an at-grade public transport system.

At the height of the debate over the Penang Transport Master Plan in 2019, Woo engaged in a series of public exchange with Dr. Ahmad Hilmy Abdul Hamid from Universiti Sains Malaysia regarding the relationship between road expansion projects and the use of private vehicles. Drawing upon his observations of Hong Kong, a city with the highest public transport usage in the world, Woo argued that the expansion of road networks within urban areas does not necessarily lead to an increase in private vehicle usage. He emphasised that the rise in private vehicle usage is primarily driven by factors such as population growth and affordability of private transportation.

Dr. Ahmad challenged Woo's perspective by referencing six studies suggesting contrary findings. He accused Woo of disregarding decades of research conducted by esteemed scholars in the field.

In response, Woo countered that the studies cited by Dr. Ahmad did not account for Hong Kong's exceptional public transport usage rate of over 90%, which continued to expand its road network. Those studies, appealed by Dr. Ahmad, were outdated, with one of them even dated back to the early 1960s, before Hong Kong began building the Mass Transit Railway (MTR) system. Woo argued that if increased road infrastructure invariably led to greater private vehicle usage and decreased public transport reliance, then Hong Kong's remarkable high public transport usage would not have been achieved since the city has been significantly expanding road network. Thus, Woo asserted that Dr. Ahmad's theory fails to adequately explain this phenomenon. Moreover, a study published in 2022 that examined the connections between transit ridership and various factors spanning from 2002 to 2017 across 85 of the largest urbanised areas in the US, found that the decreasing cost of driving emerged as the most impactful factor contributing to the decline in public transport usage, supporting Woo's perspective.

== Election results ==
Penang State Legislative Assembly
Year	Constituency	Candidate	Votes	Pct.	Opponent(s)	Votes	Pct.	Ballots cast	Majority	Turnout
2023	N25 Pulau Tikus	Joshua Woo Sze Zeng (DAP)	11,577	85.10%	Tang Ching Sern (Gerakan)	1,808	13.30%	13,719	9,769	58.99%
2023	N25 Pulau Tikus	Joshua Woo Sze Zeng (DAP)	11,577	85.10%	Goh Chuin Loon (PRM)	220	1.60%	13,719	9,769	58.99%
