= Connie Tan Hooi Peng =

Malaysian politician

Yang Berhormat Puan Connie Tan Hooi Peng MLA
- 陈汇萍

Member of the Penang State Legislative Assembly for Seri Delima
- Incumbent
- Assumed office 12 August 2023
- Preceded by: Syerleena Abdul Rashid (PH–DAP)
- Majority: 12,434 (2023)

Personal details
- Born: Connie Tan Hooi Peng; 15 December 1990 (age 35) Malaysia
- Citizenship: Malaysian
- Party: Democratic Action Party (DAP)
- Other political affiliations: Pakatan Harapan (PH)
- Education: Oxford Brookes University
- Occupation: Politician

Connie Tan Hooi Peng

Chinese name
- Traditional Chinese: 陳匯萍
- Simplified Chinese: 陈汇萍
Transcriptions
Standard Mandarin
- Hanyu Pinyin: Chén Huìpíng

Connie Tan Hooi Peng (simplified Chinese: 陈汇萍; traditional Chinese: 陳匯萍; pinyin: Chén Huìpíng; born 15 December 1990) is a Malaysian politician who has served as Member of the Penang State Legislative Assembly (MLA) for Seri Delima since August 2023. She is a member of the Democratic Action Party (DAP), a component party of the Pakatan Harapan (PH) coalition.

== Education ==
Connie is a law graduate from Oxford Brookes University.

== Political career ==
Connie has been involved in politics since 2013 and served eight terms as a member of Penang Island City Council, from 2014 to 2015, then from 2018 to 2023. She is also the Chairwoman for DAP Taman Harbour View Branch and Publicity Secretary of DAP Women Wing.

== Election results ==
Penang State Legislative Assembly
Year	Constituency	Candidate	Votes	Pct	Opponent(s)	Votes	Pct	Ballots cast	Majority	Turnout
2023	N32 Seri Delima	Connie Tan Hooi Peng (DAP)	16,384	80.60%	Mohan Apparoo (BERSATU)	3,950	19.40%	20,521	12,434	64.99%
