= Baljit Singh Jigiri Singh =

Malaysian politician

Yang Berbahagia Dato' Baljit Singh Jigiri Singh DIMP
- ਬਲਜੀਤ ਸਿੰਘ

Vice President of Parti Gerakan Rakyat Malaysia
- Incumbent
- Assumed office 17 November 2018 Serving with: David Chong Vee Hing (until 2023) &; Koo Shiaw Lee &; Ranndy Yap Kim Heng &; Michael Gan Peng Lam (until 2023) &; Soo Kay Ping (until 2023) &; Alexander Lo Su Hyen (since 2023) &; Parameswaran Ganason (since 2023) &; Chek Kwong Weng (since 2023) &; Gary Lee Ban Fatt (since 2023)
- President: Dominic Lau Hoe Chai

Personal details
- Born: Baljit Singh s/o Jigiri Singh Malaysia
- Citizenship: Malaysia
- Party: Parti Gerakan Rakyat Malaysia (GERAKAN)
- Other political affiliations: Barisan Nasional (BN) (until 2018); Perikatan Nasional (PN) (since 2021)
- Education: Gray's Inn
- Occupation: Politician
- Profession: Lawyer

Baljit Singh s/o Jigiri Singh (Punjabi: ਬਲਜੀਤ ਸਿੰਘ, romanized: Baljīt Siṅgh) is a Malaysian politician and lawyer. He is one of the Vice Presidents of Parti Gerakan Rakyat Malaysia (GERAKAN) since November 2018 when he won the position in the party elections in 2018 and was reelected to the position again in 2023. He is a member of GERAKAN, a component party of the Perikatan Nasional (PN) and formerly Barisan Nasional (BN) coalitions.

== Election results ==
Parliament of Malaysia
Year	Constituency	Candidate	Votes	Pct	Opponent(s)	Votes	Pct	Ballots cast	Majority	Turnout
2018	P050 Jelutong	Baljit Singh Jigiri Singh (Gerakan)	12,529	19.67%	Sanisvara Nethaji Rayer (DAP)	50,700	79.63%	64,584	38,171	83.90%
2018	P050 Jelutong	Baljit Singh Jigiri Singh (Gerakan)	12,529	19.67%	Tan Sim Bee (MUP)	437	0.69%	64,584	38,171	83.90%
2022	P050 Jelutong	Baljit Singh Jigiri Singh (Gerakan)	11,765	16.64%	Sanisvara Nethaji Rayer (DAP)	50,369	71.24%	70,707	38,604	75.23%
2022	P050 Jelutong	Baljit Singh Jigiri Singh (Gerakan)	11,765	16.64%	Loganathan Thoraisamy (IPF)	7,387	10.45%	70,707	38,604	75.23%
2022	P050 Jelutong	Baljit Singh Jigiri Singh (Gerakan)	11,765	16.64%	Yaccab Noor (IND)	580	0.68%	70,707	38,604	75.23%
2022	P050 Jelutong	Baljit Singh Jigiri Singh (Gerakan)	11,765	16.64%	Lim Huat Poh (WARISAN)	442	0.63%	70,707	38,604	75.23%
2022	P050 Jelutong	Baljit Singh Jigiri Singh (Gerakan)	11,765	16.64%	Koh Swe Yong (PRM)	264	0.37%	70,707	38,604	75.23%

Penang State Legislative Assembly
Year	Constituency	Candidate	Votes	Pct	Opponent(s)	Votes	Pct	Ballots cast	Majority	Turnout
2023	N17 Bukit Tengah	Baljit Singh Jigiri Singh (Gerakan)	7,353	31.42%	Gooi Hsiao Leung (PKR)	16,050	68.58%	23,403	8,697	73.98%

== Honours ==
- Pahang
  - Knight Companion of the Order of the Crown of Pahang (DIMP) – Dato' (2015)
