= Koay Teng Hai =

Malaysian politician

- 郭庭恺

Member of the Penang State Legislative Assembly for Pulau Tikus
- In office 8 March 2008 – 5 May 2013
- Preceded by: Teng Hock Nan (BN–Gerakan)
- Succeeded by: Yap Soo Huey (PR–DAP)
- Majority: 1,714 (2008)

Personal details
- Born: 26 November 1973 (age 52) Penang, Malaysia
- Party: Democratic Action Party (DAP)
- Other political affiliations: Pakatan Harapan (PH); Pakatan Rakyat (PR); Barisan Alternatif (BA)
- Spouse: Lee Su Li (李素溧)
- Children: 2
- Education: Heriot-Watt University
- Website: https://tenghai.blogspot.com/

Koay Teng Hai
- Simplified Chinese: 郭庭恺
- Traditional Chinese: 郭庭愷
Transcriptions
Standard Mandarin
- Hanyu Pinyin: Guō Tíngkǎi
Yue: Cantonese
- Jyutping: Gwok3 Ting4 Hoi2
Southern Min
- Hokkien POJ: Koeh Têng-khái

Koay Teng Hai (Chinese: 郭庭恺; Pe̍h-ōe-jī: Koeh Têng-khái; born November 26, 1973) is a Malaysian politician. He was a one-term Penang State Legislative Assemblyman for Pulau Tikus from 2008 to 2013. He is a member of the Democratic Action Party (DAP), a component party of Pakatan Harapan (PH) coalition.

== Early education ==
After graduating from Chung Ling High School in 1991, he started trading as a businessman in the industry of printing and advertising. Between the periods of 1992 to 1996, he had successfully finished his studies at The London Chamber of Commerce & Industry, obtaining an ABE Diploma and an ABE advanced Diploma. In the year 2000, he was awarded an MBA from Heriot-Watt University in an off-shore programme.

== Political career ==
Before Koay Teng Hai started his political journey, he had been influenced by his father who was also a member of the Democratic Action Party (DAP). After joining DAP, he was appointed as deputy chairman of Penang DAPSY and the following year elected as chairman of Penang DAP Socialist Youth for the tenure of 2001 to 2005. During 2003 DAP Socialist Youth Annual General Meeting, he laid down the ideology and roadmap of the youth, citing good governance should have longevity, grassroot penetration, and a wide coverage.

During the 2004 general election, he was nominated as the candidate for Air Itam of the Penang state constituency by the DAP, but he lost the election by 2,824 votes to a candidate from Gerakan (Gerakan). However, he did not give up. In the 2008 general election, he was again nominated but this time elected as the State Assemblyman for Pulau Tikus with a majority of 1,714 votes, defeating a Gerakan heavyweight Dr Teng Hock Nan who was once considered a potential future Chief Minister.

He was picked as the DAP Penang state secretary after he was elected as the Pulau Tikus assemblyman in the 2008 general election. However, due to his lack of performance, he had been replaced by Ng Wei Aik, who was also the political secretary of Lim Guan Eng. He continued to serve as a member of state executive committee.

During 29 October 2012 to 9 November 2012, he attended a United States embassy trip entitled "US Election: A Project for Young Political Leaders". For which trip, he skipped the state assembly without approval from Lim Guan Eng which subsequently caused him being sent to the DAP disciplinary committee. He was suspended from the party for six months, but after appealing to the central executive committee, the suspension period was shorten to one month.

== Election results ==
Penang State Legislative Assembly
Year	Constituency	Candidate	Votes	Pct	Opponent(s)	Votes	Pct	Ballots cast	Majority	Turnout
2004	N33 Air Itam	Koay Teng Hai (DAP)	4,401	37.12%	Cheang Chee Gooi (Gerakan)	7,225	60.94%	11,855	2,824	71.69%
2008	N25 Pulau Tikus	Koay Teng Hai (DAP)	6,649	57.40%	Teng Hock Nan (Gerakan)	4,935	42.60%	11,766	1,714	70.40%
