= Yap Soo Huey =

Malaysian politician

- 叶舒惠

Member of the Penang State Legislative Assembly for Pulau Tikus
- In office 5 May 2013 – 9 May 2018
- Preceded by: Koay Teng Hai (PR–DAP)
- Succeeded by: Chris Lee Chun Kit (PH–DAP)
- Majority: 8,220 (2013)

Personal details
- Party: Democratic Action Party (DAP)
- Other political affiliations: Pakatan Rakyat (PR) (2008–2015); Pakatan Harapan (PH) (2015–present)
- Education: Monash University; Georgia Institute of Technology

Chinese name
- Traditional Chinese: 葉舒惠
- Simplified Chinese: 叶舒惠
- Hanyu Pinyin: Yè Shūhuì
- Hokkien POJ: Ia̍p Su-hōe

Yap Soo Huey (simplified Chinese: 叶舒惠; traditional Chinese: 葉舒惠; pinyin: Yè Shūhuì; Pe̍h-ōe-jī: Ia̍p Su-hōe) is a Malaysian politician. She was a member of the Penang State Legislative Assembly representing the constituency of Pulau Tikus for one term from 2013 to 2018. She is a member of the Democratic Action Party (DAP), a component party of Pakatan Harapan (PH) coalition.

Yap graduated from Monash University, Australia, in 2005 with a bachelor's degree in Science, and was awarded Honours. She then commenced a doctoral candidature, studying the HIV virus, before returning to Penang to work for the Chief Minister, Lim Guan Eng, on his science council. She was appointed as Lim's Science, Technology and Innovation Officer.

In the 2013 election, Yap contested the seat of Pulau Tikus for Lim's DAP. She polled 11,256 votes, defeating her Barisan Nasional opponent with a majority of 8220 votes, as the DAP retained power in Penang.

In the State Assembly, Yap has promoted bicycling as an alternative to automobiles. She has also promoted the one-way traffic system in Pulau Tikus. In 2014, she said that Pulau Tikus needs better public transport.

Yap did not contest to seek a second term for her Pulau Tikus state seat in the 2018 election as to pursue her Master's in Urban and Transport Planning studies in US.

== Election results ==
Penang State Legislative Assembly
Year	Constituency	Candidate	Votes	Pct	Opponent(s)	Votes	Pct	Ballots cast	Majority	Turnout
2013	N25 Pulau Tikus	Yap Soo Huey (DAP)	11,256	78.10%	Rowena Yam (Gerakan)	3,036	21.10%	14,442	8,220	80.50%

== See also ==
- Pulau Tikus (state constituency)
