= Chris Lee Chun Kit =

Malaysian politician (born 1982)

- 李俊杰

Member of the Penang State Legislative Assembly for Pulau Tikus
- In office 9 May 2018 – 12 August 2023
- Preceded by: Yap Soo Huey (PR–DAP)
- Succeeded by: Joshua Woo Sze Zeng (PH–DAP)
- Majority: 9,245 (2018)

Member of the Penang Island City Council
- In office 2013 – 26 April 2018

Personal details
- Born: Chris Lee Chun Kit; 15 July 1982 (age 44) Penang, Malaysia
- Citizenship: Malaysian
- Party: Democratic Action Party (DAP) (since 2007)
- Other political affiliations: Pakatan Rakyat (PR) (2008–2015); Pakatan Harapan (PH) (since 2015)
- Education: Nottingham Trent University
- Occupation: Politician

Chris Lee Chun Kit (simplified Chinese: 李俊杰; traditional Chinese: 李俊傑; pinyin: Lǐ Jùnjié; Pe̍h-ōe-jī: Lí Chùn-kia̍t, born 15 July 1982) is a Malaysian politician who served as Member of the Penang State Legislative Assembly (MLA) for Pulau Tikus from May 2018 to August 2023. He also served as Member of the Penang Island City Council from 2013 to April 2018. He is a member of the Democratic Action Party (DAP), a component party of the Pakatan Harapan (PH) and formerly Pakatan Rakyat (PR) coalitions.

== Personal life ==
Lee was born in George Town, Penang on 15 July 1982, the first born son of George and Betty Lee (née Chan). He has a younger sister, Lee Yen Ling, who was diagnosed with autism at an early age.

=== Early education ===
Lee attended St. Andrew's Kindergarten and went on to finish his primary education at St. Xavier's Branch School. It was at the primary school that he met future DAP leader and former MP for Bukit Bendera, Zairil Khir Johari. He then proceeded to St. Xavier's Institution for his secondary education. He graduated secondary school in 1999. He then obtained an advanced diploma in mass communications at MDIS, Singapore before obtaining his bachelor's degree in business administration from the Nottingham-Trent University in a local undergraduate program at Olympia College.

== Political career ==
Lee politically active in 2007 and went on to join the Democratic Action Party (DAP). He initially joined the party as a volunteer but got more involved as time went on. In 2012, he became the Youth Chief for the party's Youth Wing division of Bukit Bendera as well as the party's Deputy Youth Chief in Penang.

Following the 2013 Penang state election, Chris Lee was appointed as one of the 24 councillors of the then Penang Island Municipal Council, taking office on 8 July. In 2015, the city status of George Town, Penang's capital city, was expanded to encompass the entirety of Penang Island, thus upgrading the local government into the present-day Penang Island City Council.

On 26 April 2018, prior to the state election that year, Chris Lee stepped down as a Councillor of the Penang Island City Council and was selected to contest the state constituency of Pulau Tikus, where he had spent his childhood years. Despite the three cornered tussle at the constituency, he prevailed in the election, winning by a margin of 9,245 votes.

== Temporary hiatus ==
Prior to the 15th Penang State Elections that were scheduled to be held in 2023, Chris decided to take a brief hiatus from active politics to concentrate on recovery from symptoms of hyperthyroidism that hereditary in his family. During his hiatus, he travelled extensively around southeast asia to improve his knowledge of history, civilizations and culture should he decide to return to public service one day. After a year and a half of medical therapy, Chris' thyroid functions had returned to normal and he had begun to ponder on a potential political return.

== Return to politics ==
In November 2024, the newly elected DAP Penang State Committee leadership led by Steven Sim announced that Chris had been appointed as the committee's Executive Secretary. This marked Chris' official return to active party politics after one and a half years.

== Election results ==
Penang State Legislative Assembly
Year	Constituency	Candidate	Votes	Pct	Opponent(s)	Votes	Pct	Ballots cast	Majority	Turnout
2018	N25 Pulau Tikus	Chris Lee Chun Kit (DAP)	11,679	82.32%	Loo Jieh Sheng (Gerakan)	2,434	17.16%	14,188	9,245	78.05%
2018	N25 Pulau Tikus	Chris Lee Chun Kit (DAP)	11,679	82.32%	Wee Kean Wai (MUP)	75	0.53%	14,188	9,245	78.05%

== See also ==
- Pulau Tikus (state constituency)
