= Soochow University School of Law =

Law school in Taiwan

Coordinates: 25.0944°N 121.5453°E

- 東吳大學法學院
- Motto: 養天地正氣 法古今完人
- Motto in English: Unto A Full Grown Man
- Type: Private
- Established: Founded 1900, "Reactivated" 1951
- Affiliations: ACUCA; U12 Consortium; United Board
- President: Wei-Ta Pan (2012-)
- Academic staff: 448 full-time, 747 part-time
- Undergraduates: 12,000
- Postgraduates: 1,100
- Location: Taipei City, Taiwan
- Campus: Semi-rural, 37.5 acres (0.152 km^{2})
- Endowment: US$-- (NT$--)
- Mascot: None
- Website: www.scu.edu.tw (in English)

Soochow University School of Law is the law school of Soochow University, a private university in Taipei, Taiwan.

== History ==
Soochow University was founded in 1900 at Soo Chow (now Suzhou), mainland China. The Comparative Law School of the university was later founded in 1915 in Shanghai Kunshan Road, starting with the law department. In 1927 it changed its name to the law school and started dedicating to education of professional law. Its curriculum adopts both national and common law, and it positively cultivates talents in comparative law and international law. It is the only college in China that teaches Anglo-American law in a systematic way outside of Chinese law.

Soochow University School of Law provided modern legal training prior to the middle of the 20th century in Asia. During the Chinese Civil War, the university was forced to limit its operation along with many other academic institutes. In 1969, the Ministry of Education approved the restoration of a complete university system, which is a "private Soochow University" with a liberal arts, law, and business college. After the restoration in Taiwan, it continued its tradition. In 1972 the School of Law moved into a new seven-story, air-conditioned building in downtown Taipei. These quarters are shared with the Graduate School of Economics and the School of Commerce. The building is strategically located near the Presidential Office and the judicial and legislative government complex.

=== Department of law ===
In 1954, the Soochow University School of Law was re-established in Taiwan with a Department of Law. Then in 1971, the Institute of Law was formally established, and the former UN Secretary of the Law, Liang Shuli, was appointed as the first director in the same year, the Faculty of Law of the University Department was divided into two groups, the Judicial Practice Group and the Comparative Law Group. In order to meet the needs of the society, the Department of Nighttime was also established to train young people in the same year. In the 81st academic year, the Judicial Implementation Team and the Comparative Law Group were abolished, and the original system was restored. The group system was changed. It was divided into the Public Law Group, the Civil and Commercial Law Group and the International Law Group in the third year of the university for students to take elective courses. , with the development of its diverse career. In 1992, the university department canceled the group course and responded to the non-group enrollment system.
