= Jeff Ooi =

Malaysian politician

- 黄泉安
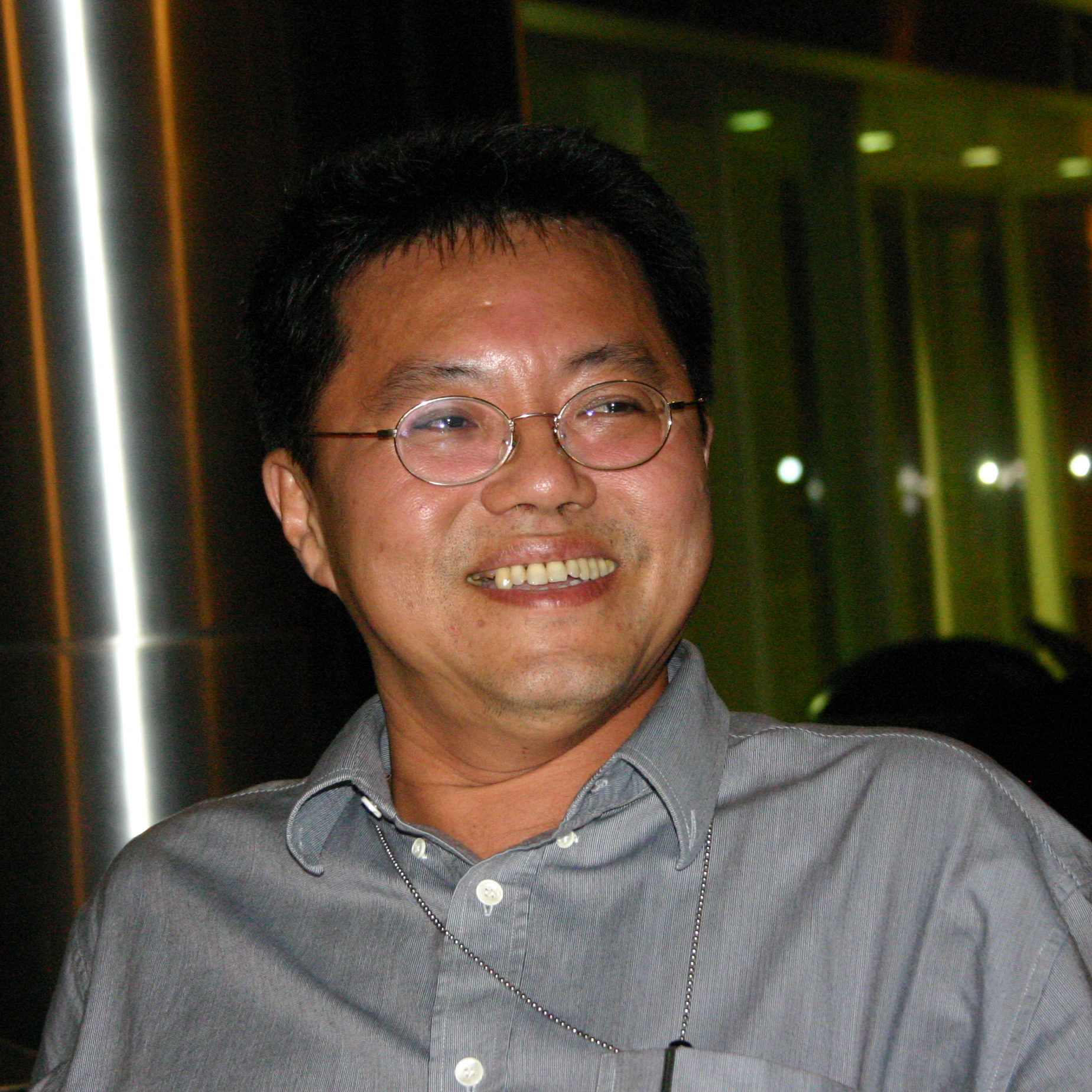

Member of the Malaysian Parliament for Jelutong
- In office 8 March 2008 – 9 May 2018
- Preceded by: Lee Kah Choon (BN–Gerakan)
- Succeeded by: Sanisvara Nethaji Rayer Rajaji Rayer (PH–DAP)
- Majority: 16,246 (2008); 25,750 (2013)

Personal details
- Born: Ooi Chuan Aun; 2 November 1955 (age 70) Kedah, Federation of Malaya (now Malaysia)
- Citizenship: Malaysian
- Party: Parti Gerakan Rakyat Malaysia (Gerakan) (–2007); Democratic Action Party (DAP) (2007–2022); Heritage Party (WARISAN) (since 2022)
- Other political affiliations: Barisan Nasional (BN) (–2007); Pakatan Rakyat (PR) (2008–2015); Pakatan Harapan (PH) (2015–2022)
- Occupation: Politician
- Website: www.jeffooi.com

Jeff Ooi

Chinese name
- Traditional Chinese: 黃泉安
- Simplified Chinese: 黄泉安
- Hanyu Pinyin: Huáng Quán Ān
- Jyutping: Wong4 Cyun4 On1
- Hokkien POJ: Ûiⁿ Choân-an
- Tâi-lô: Uînn Tsuân-an

Ooi Chuan Aun (simplified Chinese: 黄泉安; traditional Chinese: 黃泉安; pinyin: Huáng Quán Ān; Jyutping: Wong4 Cyun4 On1; Pe̍h-ōe-jī: Ûiⁿ Choân-an; born 2 November 1955), better known as Jeff Ooi, is a Malaysian IT consultant, blogger, photographer and politician who served as the Member of Parliament (MP) for Jelutong for two terms from March 2008 to May 2018.

He is a member of the Heritage Party (WARISAN) and was a member of the Democratic Action Party (DAP), a component party of the Pakatan Harapan (PH) and formerly Pakatan Rakyat (PR) opposition coalitions and a member of the Parti Gerakan Rakyat Malaysia (GERAKAN), then component party of the ruling Barisan Nasional (BN) coalition.

== Early life ==
Ooi is from a small town in the northern Malaysian state of Kedah. He was brought up among rural teenagers and is trilingual, fluent in Mandarin, English and Malay.

== Blog and internet activity ==
Jeff Ooi used to write a blog known as "Screenshots...", which he started on 2 January 2003, covering current issues relating to Malaysia, mainly on politics. From time to time, it also touches on international news and photography.

Jeff Ooi's blog was described as "Malaysia's Most Influential Blog" by Malaysiakini, a local online news publication known for its different stance to the mainstream media. In 2005, Screenshots won in the Asia category of the Freedom Blogs Awards given by Reporters Without Borders.

Ooi is also the administrator at a photography forum called Lensa Malaysia, which receives 200,000-page views per month. He is also the founder and administrator of UEP Subang Jaya and Subang Jaya's community forum usj.com.my, and was hired by CNET Asia as a tech blogger alongside other CNET Asia bloggers. He named his CNET Asia blog Lemak Lemang, a reference to Lemang, coconut-flavoured sticky rice stuffed in a bamboo stick traditionally prepared by Malays.

== Political career (2006-present) ==
In 2006, it was reported by The Star, a local English language daily, that Ooi was among several local bloggers being approached by the opposition Democratic Action Party (DAP) to run for public office. Ooi, who was at the time a member of Parti Gerakan Rakyat Malaysia (GERAKAN), a component party of the ruling Barisan Nasional (BN) coalition, stated that it was "too premature at this point" for him to consider entering active politics.

He joined DAP on 31 July 2007. Ooi stood as a DAP candidate in the 2008 general election for a seat in Jelutong, Penang, which he won by 16,246 votes. He retained his seat in the 2013 general election. Ooi was dropped by DAP as a candidate in the 2018 general election.

On 22 January 2022, he was present at a Heritage Party (WARISAN) event namely "Warisan Unity Night" and revealed his hope that his application to join WARISAN would be considered. On 24 January 2022, he was confirmed to have joined WARISAN and been appointed as the state coordinator of WARISAN of Penang He claim more Penang DAP leaders set to join Warisan which hope to contest all federal and state seats of Penang in the next general and state elections (GE15).

=== Lawsuit as blogger ===
On 11 January 2007, Ooi, alongside Ahirudin Attan, was sued by the New Straits Times Press (NSTP). The Malaysian court ordered Ooi to remove more than 10 posts on his blog that the NSTP claimed were libellous by 17 January. Ooi was prohibited from republishing the posts on his blog or anywhere else on the internet until the resolution of the defamation suit. The lawsuits were the first of their kind in Malaysia. Prime Minister Abdullah Ahmad Badawi defended the legal action launched against Ooi, saying the Internet was not exempt from defamation laws. This lawsuit spawned the 'Bloggers United' campaign to defend bloggers and freedom of expression. Jeff Ooi and Ahirudin chose to defend themselves in court. The situation resulted in various newspapers covering Malaysian blogging. A fund was also set up to protect bloggers and support their activities.

=== Islamic extremist remarks ===
In early August 2009, Ooi had labelled Mohd Razali Abdullah, a Penang Island Municipal Council (MPPP) councillor, an Islamic extremist. This caused a public scandal, especially from within the Muslim community, because Razali was a member of Jamaah Islah Malaysia (JIM), a registered organisation with close ties with Ooi's own party's youth wing, the Penang DAP Socialist Youth. His comments were interpreted as claiming that Syariah Law was extreme and that Muslims are extremists. The Chief Minister of Penang, Lim Guan Eng, ordered Ooi to retract his statements and apologise publicly, which Ooi eventually did after initially refusing. However, he did not offer an apology and continued criticising Razali, calling him "a political burden to the state government". The Islamic religious leaders association of Penang (Persatuan Ulama' Malaysia cawangan Pulau Pinang) subsequently launched a petition to demand that Ooi resign from office for his comments about Muslims and Islam in Malaysia.

=== Disdain slurs ===
In November 2013, Ooi had drawn flak by calling 'kucing kurap' (literally mangy cats) two MPPP officers accompanying him as Jelutong MP during his visit to an illegal hawker site when he was unsatisfied with them who were ill-informed. Ooi had apologised for his controversial remark later after DAP chairman Karpal Singh had rebuked and called on him to publicly apologise.

== Election results ==
Parliament of Malaysia
Year	Constituency	Candidate	Votes	Pct	Opponent(s)	Votes	Pct	Ballots cast	Majority	Turnout
2008	P050 Jelutong	Ooi Chuan Aun (DAP)	30,493	66.84%	Thor Teong Gee (Gerakan)	14,247	31.23%	46,406	16,246	76.85%
2008	P050 Jelutong	Ooi Chuan Aun (DAP)	30,493	66.84%	Badrul Zaman P.S. Md Zakariah (IND)	882	1.93%	46,406	16,246	76.85%
2013	P050 Jelutong	Ooi Chuan Aun (DAP)	43,211	71.22%	Ng Fook On (Gerakan)	17,461	28.78%	61,725	25,750	86.64%
2022	P052 Bayan Baru	Ooi Chuan Aun (WARISAN)	440	0.49%	Sim Tze Tzin (PKR)	55,209	61.54%	89,707	34,902	79.63%
2022	P052 Bayan Baru	Ooi Chuan Aun (WARISAN)	440	0.49%	Oh Tong Keong (Gerakan)	20,307	22.64%	89,707	34,902	79.63%
2022	P052 Bayan Baru	Ooi Chuan Aun (WARISAN)	440	0.49%	Saw Yee Fung (MCA)	13,377	14.91%	89,707	34,902	79.63%
2022	P052 Bayan Baru	Ooi Chuan Aun (WARISAN)	440	0.49%	Ravinder Singh (PRM)	251	0.28%	89,707	34,902	79.63%
2022	P052 Bayan Baru	Ooi Chuan Aun (WARISAN)	440	0.49%	Kan Chee Yuen (IND)	124	0.14%	89,707	34,902	79.63%

== See also ==
- Political blog
