= Jayabalan Thambyappa =

Malaysian politician

Yang Berbahagia Dato' Jayabalan Thambyappa DSPN

Member of the Penang State Legislative Assembly for Batu Uban
- In office 5 May 2013 – 9 May 2018
- Preceded by: Raveenthran Subramaniam (PR–PKR)
- Succeeded by: Kumaresan Aramugam (PH–PKR)
- Majority: 9,857 (2013)

Personal details
- Born: Jayabalan A/L A. Thambyappa; 17 April 1945 (age 81) Penang, Japanese occupation of Malaya
- Party: People's Justice Party (PKR)
- Other political affiliations: Pakatan Rakyat (PR) (2008–2015); Pakatan Harapan (PH) (2015–present)
- Occupation: Politician
- Profession: Doctor

Jayabalan s/o A. Thambyappa is a Malaysian politician and doctor. He had served as Member of the Penang State Legislative Assembly (MLA) for Batu Uban from May 2013 to May 2018. He is a member of People's Justice Party (PKR), a component party of Pakatan Harapan (PH) coalitions and formerly Pakatan Rakyat (PR) coalitions.

== Background ==
Jayabalan Thambyappa holds a Bachelor of Medicine and Bachelor of Surgery (MBBS).

== Political career ==
He made his first electoral debut in Batu Uban state seat and won the seat by defeating BN candidate Goh Kheng Sneah and 3 other Independent candidate in 2013 state election. However, his name was dropped in 2018 state election.

== Election results ==
Penang State Legislative Assembly
Year	Constituency	Candidate	Votes	Pct	Opponent(s)	Votes	Pct	Ballots cast	Majority	Turnout
2013	N35 Batu Uban	Jayabalan Thambyappa (PKR)	17,017	69.70%	Goh Kheng Sneah (Gerakan)	7,160	29.30%	24,750	9,857	86.40%
2013	N35 Batu Uban	Jayabalan Thambyappa (PKR)	17,017	69.70%	Mohd Noor Mohd Abdul Kadeer (IND)	186	0.76%	24,750	9,857	86.40%
2013	N35 Batu Uban	Jayabalan Thambyappa (PKR)	17,017	69.70%	Baratharajan Narayanasamy Pillai (IND)	40	0.16%	24,750	9,857	86.40%
2013	N35 Batu Uban	Jayabalan Thambyappa (PKR)	17,017	69.70%	Rajendra Ammasi (IND)	26	0.08%	24,750	9,857	86.40%

== Honours ==
- Penang
  - Officer of the Order of the Defender of State (DSPN) – Dato' (2019)
