= Seri Delima =

State constituency in Penang, Malaysia

Seri Delima (N32)
Penang constituency
- Seri Delima (olive) on Penang

State constituency
- Legislature: Penang State Legislative Assembly
MLA
Connie Tan Hooi Peng
PH
- Constituency created: 2004
- First contested: 2004
- Last contested: 2023

Demographics
- Electors (2023): 31,574
- Area (km²): 5

Seri Delima is a state constituency in Penang, Malaysia, that has been represented in the Penang State Legislative Assembly since 2004. It covers parts of Gelugor, a suburb of George Town, as well as the affluent neighbourhood of Green Lane.

The state constituency was first contested in 2004 and is mandated to return a single Assemblyman to the Penang State Legislative Assembly under the first-past-the-post voting system. Since 2018, the State Assemblyman for Seri Delima is Syerleena Abdul Rashid from the Democratic Action Party (DAP), which is part of the state's ruling coalition, Pakatan Harapan (PH).

== Definition ==
=== Polling districts ===
According to the federal gazette issued on 30 March 2018, the Seri Delima constituency is divided into 7 polling districts.

State constituency	Polling districts	Code	Location
Seri Delima (N32)	Kampong Hijau	051/32/01	SK Batu Lanchang
Seri Delima (N32)	Island Park	051/32/02	SMJK Chung Hwa Confucian
Seri Delima (N32)	Lintang Delima	051/32/03	SMK Hamid Khan
Seri Delima (N32)	Lorong Delima	051/32/04	SMK Hamid Khan
Seri Delima (N32)	Bukit Gelugor	051/32/05	SK Bukit Gelugor
Seri Delima (N32)	Taman Tun Sardon	051/32/06	SMK Datuk Hj. Mohamed Nor Ahmad
Seri Delima (N32)	Sungai Gelugor	051/32/07	SK Sg Gelugor

This state seat comprises the northern half of Gelugor, a suburb of George Town, and the leafy, affluent neighbourhood of Green Lane.

Seri Delima is bounded to the north by Green Lane and Jalan Tunku Kudin. The southern limits of the constituency roughly follows the course of the Gelugor River into the sea, with the portion of Gelugor south of the river coming under the neighbouring Batu Uban constituency.

== Demographics ==
Ethnic breakdown of Seri Delima's electorate as of 2023
1. Chinese (64.5%)
2. Malay (22.1%)
3. Indian (12.4%)
4. Other ethnicities (0.93%)

Total electors by polling district in 2016
Polling district	Electors
Bukit Gelugor	3,294
Island Park	4,118
Kampong Hijau	3,336
Lintang Delima	4,617
Lorong Delima	2,409
Sungai Gelugor	2,824
Taman Tun Sardon	3,551
Total	24,149
Source: Malaysian Election Commission

== History ==
Penang State Legislative Assemblyman for Seri Delima
Assembly	No	Years	Member	Party
Constituency created from Bukit Gelugor, Paya Terubong and Batu Uban
11th	N32	2004 – 2008	Koay Kar Huah (郭家骅)	BN (MCA)
12th	N32	2008 – 2013	Sanisvara Nethaji Rayer	PR (DAP)
13th	N32	2013 – 2018	Sanisvara Nethaji Rayer	PR (DAP)
14th	N32	2018 – 2023	Syerleena Abdul Rashid	PH (DAP)
15th	N32	2023 – present	Connie Tan Hooi Peng (陈汇萍)	PH (DAP)

== Election results ==
The electoral results for the Seri Delima state constituency are as follows.

Penang state election, 2023: Seri Delima
Party	Candidate	Votes	%	∆%
PH	Connie Tan Hooi Peng	16,384	80.60	▼1.90
PN	Mohan Apparoo	3,950	19.40	▲19.40
Total valid votes		20,334	100.00	
Total rejected ballots		140		
Unreturned ballots		47		
Turnout		20,521	64.99	▼15.41
Registered electors		31,574		
Majority		12,434	61.20	▼4.60
PH hold		Swing		
Source(s) https://undi.info/seat/PN.N.SERI_DELIMA

Penang state election, 2018: Seri Delima
Party	Candidate	Votes	%	∆%
PKR	Syerleena Abdul Rashid	16,553	82.50	▲8.90
BN	Khoo Kay Teong	3,342	16.70	▼9.70
BERSAMA	Tan Yang Yung	159	0.80	▲0.80
Total valid votes		20,054	100.00	
Total rejected ballots		141		
Unreturned ballots		90		
Turnout		20,285	80.40	▼3.30
Registered electors		25,232		
Majority		13,211	65.80	▲18.60
PKR hold		Swing		
Source(s) "His Majesty's Government Gazette - Notice of Contested Election, State Legislative Assembly for the State of Penang [P.U. (B) 252/2018]" (PDF). Attorney General's Chambers of Malaysia. 3 May 2018. "Federal Government Gazette - Results of Contested Election and Statements of the Poll after the Official Addition of Votes, State Constituencies for the State of Penang [P.U. (B) 326/2018]" (PDF). Attorney General's Chambers of Malaysia. 28 May 2018.

Penang state election, 2013: Seri Delima
Party	Candidate	Votes	%	∆%
DAP	Sanisvara Nethaji Rayer	14,478	73.60	▲16.40
BN	Low Joo Hiap	5,201	26.40	▼16.40
Total valid votes		19,679	100.00	
Total rejected ballots		209		
Unreturned ballots		56		
Turnout		19,944	83.70	▲11.00
Registered electors		23,841		
Majority		9,277	47.20	▲32.80
DAP hold		Swing		
Source(s) "Federal Government Gazette - Notice of Contested Election, State Legislative Assembly for the State of Penang [P.U. (B) 189/2013]" (PDF). Attorney General's Chambers of Malaysia. 26 April 2013. "Federal Government Gazette - Results of Contested Election and Statements of the Poll after the Official Addition of Votes, State Constituencies for the State of Penang [P.U. (B) 230/2013]" (PDF). Attorney General's Chambers of Malaysia. 22 May 2013.

Penang state election, 2008: Seri Delima
Party	Candidate	Votes	%	∆%
DAP	Sanisvara Nethaji Rayer	8,402	57.20	▲24.70
BN	Loh Nam Hooi	6,274	42.80	▼24.70
Total valid votes		14,676	100.00	
Total rejected ballots		217		
Unreturned ballots		22		
Turnout		14,915	72.70	▲1.32
Registered electors		20,510		
Majority		2,128	14.40	▼20.60
DAP gain from BN		Swing		?

Penang state election, 2004: Seri Delima
Party	Candidate	Votes	%
BN	Koay Kar Huah	9,489	67.50
DAP	Tan Hun Wooi	4,569	32.50
Total valid votes		14,058	100.00
Total rejected ballots		263	
Unreturned ballots		25	
Turnout		14,346	71.38
Registered electors		20,097	
Majority		2,128	35.00
This was a new constituency created.

== See also ==
- Constituencies of Penang
