= Syerleena Abdul Rashid =

Malaysian politician

Yang Berhormat Puan Syerleena Abdul Rashid MP
- شيرلينا عبد الرشيد
- Syerleena in 2022

Member of the Malaysian Parliament for Bukit Bendera
- Incumbent
- Assumed office 19 November 2022
- Preceded by: Wong Hon Wai (PH–DAP)
- Majority: 42,610 (2022)

Member of the Penang State Legislative Assembly for Seri Delima
- In office 9 May 2018 – 12 August 2023
- Preceded by: RSN Rayer (PR–DAP)
- Succeeded by: Connie Tan Hooi Peng (PH–DAP)
- Majority: 13,211 (2018)

Other roles
- 2015–2018: Councillor of the Penang Island City Council

Personal details
- Born: Syerleena binti Abdul Rashid; 31 August 1980 (age 46) Penang, Malaysia
- Citizenship: Malaysian
- Party: Democratic Action Party (DAP) (2013–present)
- Other political affiliations: Pakatan Rakyat (PR) (2013–2015); Pakatan Harapan (PH) (2015–present)
- Spouse: Tom Osborn (m. 2021)
- Parent: Abdul Rashid Hanafi (father)
- Education: Universiti Sains Malaysia (BA)
- Occupation: Politician

Syerleena Abdul Rashid (born 31 August 1980) is a Malaysian politician who has served as the Member of Parliament (MP) for Bukit Bendera since November 2022. She served as Member of the Penang State Legislative Assembly (MLA) for Seri Delima from May 2018 to August 2023 and Member of the Penang Island City Council from 2015 to 2018. She is a member of the Democratic Action Party (DAP), a component party of the Pakatan Harapan (PH) and formerly Pakatan Rakyat (PR) coalitions. In addition to her involvement in politics, Syerleena was previously a columnist of The Malaysian Insider and contributed extensively in various online news portals. She was also formerly a member of Aliran, a local non-governmental organisation (NGO), as well as an anti-human trafficking movement.

== Early life and education ==
Syerleena was a Graphic Communication graduate from School of Arts, Universiti Sains Malaysia in Penang, but prior to that she had received her primary and secondary education from Convent Green Lane.

== Political career ==
Syerleena joined the Democratic Action Party (DAP) in 2013, after being encouraged by her associate, Chris Lee Chun Kit. Both Syerleena and Chris were subsequently appointed as councillors of the Penang Island City Council, with Syerleena taking office in the local government in January 2015.

On 26 April 2018, prior to the Penang state election that year, Syerleena stepped down as a Councillor of the Penang Island City Council and was selected to contest the state constituency of Seri Delima. She faced a three cornered tussle for the constituency, and had to endure personal attacks and harassment by her opponents, especially Barisan Nasional (BN) far-rights from the United Malays National Organisation (UMNO). In spite of these, Syerleena prevailed in the election, winning by a margin of 13,211 votes.

Syerleena continued to face harassment by Muslim extremists after the election. In July 2018, she received a death threat accompanied by two slanderous messages, accusing her of wanting to weaken Islamic institutions and make Christianity the country's official religion. In addition to her political roles, she has contributed extensively to various online news portals and was a member of Aliran, a local non-governmental organization.

=== Election to Parliament ===
In the 2022 parliamentary election, Syerleena contested the Bukit Bendera constituency in Penang. She won the seat with a significant majority of 42,610 votes, securing 78.98% of the total votes cast. Her victory marked a significant achievement in her political career.

=== DAP Penang ===
Syerleena formally joined DAP in 2013 and is currently the Assistant Publicity Secretary for DAP Penang and a National Executive Committee Member for DAP Wanita (the national women’s wing of the party).

Syerleena is one of the DAP leaders being sued for defamation by UUM lecturer, Kamarul Zaman Yusoff for a statement she had written in 2017 “Save yourself first and leave the rest of the nation alone” which was published by several online news portals.

== Awards and recognition ==
=== YSEALI ===
In 2015, Syerleena was selected to participate in the Young Southeast Asian Leaders Initiative, also known as YSEALI a highly-competitive cultural exchange program for Southeast Asian emerging leaders sponsored by the U.S. Bureau of Education and Cultural Affairs under the U.S Department of State. Under the Fall of 2015 cohort, Professional Fellowship Program, she spent 4 weeks with the Des Moines City Council, Iowa.

=== ACYPL-US State Department Exchange Delegate ===
Syerleena was selected as a delegate for the American Council of Young Political Leaders Exchange Program in collaboration with the United States government's State Department and observed election rallies of presidential candidates including that of Donald Trump, Hillary Clinton and Bernie Sanders as well as observed a caucus in Iowa.

== Personal life ==
In February 2021, Syerleena married Tom Osborn. She is the guitarist and song writer for a local rock band, Priwayat, which she formed with fellow Penang MLA and DAP member, Zairil Khir Johari. On 4 June 2024, her father, Abdul Rashid Hanafi passed away of age-related causes at the age of 80 at his home at Miami Green Apartments in Batu Ferringhi. His remains were buried at Masjid Jamek Hashim Yahaya in Perak Road on the same day.

== Election results ==
Parliament of Malaysia
Year	Constituency	Candidate	Votes	Pct	Opponent(s)	Votes	Pct	Ballots cast	Majority	Turnout
2022	P048 Bukit Bendera	Syerleena Abdul Rashid (DAP)	49,353	78.98%	Hng Chee Wey (GERAKAN)	6,743	10.79%	63,404	42,610	69.00%
2022	P048 Bukit Bendera	Syerleena Abdul Rashid (DAP)	49,353	78.98%	Richie Huan Xin Yun (PCM)	5,417	8.67%	63,404	42,610	69.00%
2022	P048 Bukit Bendera	Syerleena Abdul Rashid (DAP)	49,353	78.98%	Teh Yee Cheu (PRM)	677	1.08%	63,404	42,610	69.00%
2022	P048 Bukit Bendera	Syerleena Abdul Rashid (DAP)	49,353	78.98%	Razali Mohd Zin (IND)	299	0.48%	63,404	42,610	69.00%

Penang State Legislative Assembly
Year	Constituency	Candidate	Votes	Pct	Opponent(s)	Votes	Pct	Ballots cast	Majority	Turnout
2018	N32 Seri Delima	Syerleena Abdul Rashid (DAP)	16,553	82.50%	Khoo Kay Teong (MCA)	3,342	16.70%	20,285	13,211	80.40%
2018	N32 Seri Delima	Syerleena Abdul Rashid (DAP)	16,553	82.50%	Tan Yang Yung (MUP)	159	0.80%	20,285	13,211	80.40%

== See also ==
- Seri Delima (state constituency)
