= Batu Uban (state constituency) =

Constituency in Penang, Malaysia

Batu Uban (N35)
Penang constituency
- Batu Uban (olive) on Penang Island

State constituency
- Legislature: Penang State Legislative Assembly
MLA
Kumaresan Aramugam
PH
- Constituency created: 1986
- First contested: 1986
- Last contested: 2023

Demographics
- Electors (2023): 43,529
- Area (km²): 9

Batu Uban is a state constituency in Penang, Malaysia, that has been represented in the Penang State Legislative Assembly since 1986. It covers a portion of Penang Island's eastern seaboard, including the southernmost suburbs of George Town.

The state constituency was first contested in 1986 and is mandated to return a single Assemblyman to the Penang State Legislative Assembly under the first-past-the-post voting system. Since 2018, the State Assemblyman for Batu Uban is Kumaresan Aramugam from Parti Keadilan Rakyat (PKR), which is part of the state's ruling coalition, Pakatan Harapan (PH).

== Definition ==
=== Polling districts ===
According to the federal gazette issued on 30 March 2018, the Batu Uban constituency is divided into 8 polling districts.

State constituency	Polling districts	Code	Location
Batu Uban (N35)	Minden Heights	052/35/01	SK Minden Height
Batu Uban (N35)	Universiti Sains	052/35/02	SK Minden Height
Batu Uban (N35)	Batu Uban	052/35/03	Kompleks Pencak Silat Majlis Sukan Negeri Pulau Pinang
Batu Uban (N35)	Sungai Dua	052/36/04	SJK (C) Keong Hoe
Batu Uban (N35)	Bukit Jambol	052/35/05	SJK (C) Min Sin
Batu Uban (N35)	Bukit Gambir	052/35/06	SMK Bukit Gambir
Batu Uban (N35)	Taman Jubilee	052/35/07	SMK Sungai Nibong
Batu Uban (N35)	Taman Pekaka	052/36/08	SMK Bukit Jambul

It encompasses the southernmost halve of Gelugor, a suburb of George Town, including Universiti Sains Malaysia and Minden Heights. Surrounding neighbourhoods such as Batu Uban, Sungai Dua, Sungai Nibong and Bukit Jambul are also situated within this state seat.

The northern limits of this constituency roughly follows the course of the Gelugor River into the sea, thereby dividing Gelugor into the northern and southern halves (with the northern half under the neighbouring Seri Delima constituency). The Batu Uban seat is also bounded to the south by Jalan Tun Dr Awang, Jalan Sultan Azlan Shah and Sungai Dua.

== Demographics ==
Ethnic breakdown of Batu Uban's electorate as of 2023
1. Chinese (58.7%)
2. Malay (25.4%)
3. Indian (14.7%)
4. Other ethnicities (1.17%)

Total electors by polling district in 2016
Polling district	Electors
Batu Uban	4,692
Bukit Gambir	2,397
Bukit Jambol	3,512
Minden Heights	3,488
Sungai Dua	2,615
Taman Jubilee	7,370
Taman Pekaka	5,257
Universiti Sains	210
Total	29,541
Source: Malaysian Election Commission

== History ==
Penang State Legislative Assemblyman for Batu Uban
Assembly	No	Years	Member	Party
Constituency created from Sungai Nibong and Bukit Gelugor
7th	N30	1986 – 1990	Kee Phaik Cheen (纪碧真)	BN (GERAKAN)
8th	N30	1990 – 1995	Kee Phaik Cheen (纪碧真)	BN (GERAKAN)
9th	N30	1995 – 1999	Kee Phaik Cheen (纪碧真)	BN (GERAKAN)
10th	N30	1999 – 2004	Kee Phaik Cheen (纪碧真)	BN (GERAKAN)
11th	N35	2004 – 2008	Goh Kheng Sneah (吴竟城)	BN (GERAKAN)
12th	N35	2008 – 2013	Raveenthran V. Subramaniam	PR (PKR)
13th	N35	2013 – 2015	Jayabalan Thambyappa	PR (PKR)
13th	N35	2015 – 2018	Jayabalan Thambyappa	PH (PKR)
14th	N35	2018 – 2023	Kumaresan Aramugam	PH (PKR)
15th	N35	2023–present	Kumaresan Aramugam	PH (PKR)

== Election results ==
The electoral results for the Batu Uban state constituency in 2008, 2013 and 2018 are as follows.

Penang state election, 2023
Party	Candidate	Votes	%	∆%
PH	Kumaresan Aramugam	22,773	76.80	▼3.60
PN	Mok Kok On	6,065	20.50	▲20.50
MUDA	Lee Kim Noor	803	2.70	▲2.70
Total valid votes		29,641	100.00	
Total rejected ballots		136		
Unreturned ballots		82		
Turnout		29,859	68.60	▼14.50
Registered electors		43,529		
Majority		16,708	56.30	▼9.60
PH hold		Swing		

Penang state election, 2018
Party	Candidate	Votes	%	∆%
PKR	Kumaresan Aramugam	21,079	80.40	▲10.70
BN	Hng Chee Wey	3,806	14.50	▼14.80
PAS	Vikneswaran Muniandy	1,176	4.50	▲4.50
Penang Front Party	Teoh Kean Liang	32	0.20	▲0.20
BERSAMA	Teoh Kok Siang	116	0.40	▲0.40
Total valid votes		26,209	100.00	
Total rejected ballots		235		
Unreturned ballots		79		
Turnout		26,523	83.10	▼3.30
Registered electors		31,924		
Majority		17,273	65.90	▲25.50
PKR hold		Swing		
Source(s) "His Majesty's Government Gazette - Notice of Contested Election, State Legislative Assembly for the State of Penang [P.U. (B) 252/2018]" (PDF). Attorney General's Chambers of Malaysia. 3 May 2018. "Federal Government Gazette - Results of Contested Election and Statements of the Poll after the Official Addition of Votes, State Constituencies for the State of Penang [P.U. (B) 326/2018]" (PDF). Attorney General's Chambers of Malaysia. 28 May 2018. Archived from the original (PDF) on 29 August 2019.

Penang state election, 2013
Party	Candidate	Votes	%	∆%
PKR	Jayabalan Thambyappa	17,017	69.70	▲17.70
BN	Goh Kheng Sneah	7,160	29.30	▼18.70
Independent	Mohd Noor Mohd Abdul Kadeer	186	0.76	▲0.76
Independent	Baratharajan Narayanasamy Pillai	40	0.16	▲0.16
Independent	Rajendra Ammasi	26	0.08	▲0.08
Total valid votes		24,429	100.00	
Total rejected ballots		246		
Unreturned ballots		75		
Turnout		24,750	86.40	▲10.90
Registered electors		28,649		
Majority		9,857	40.40	▲36.40
PKR hold		Swing		
Source(s) "Federal Government Gazette - Notice of Contested Election, State Legislative Assembly for the State of Penang [P.U. (B) 189/2013]" (PDF). Attorney General's Chambers of Malaysia. 26 April 2013. "Federal Government Gazette - Results of Contested Election and Statements of the Poll after the Official Addition of Votes, State Constituencies for the State of Penang [P.U. (B) 230/2013]" (PDF). Attorney General's Chambers of Malaysia. 22 May 2013. Archived from the original (PDF) on 22 March 2019.

Penang state election, 2008
Party	Candidate	Votes	%	∆%
PKR	Raveentharan V. Subramaniam	8,046	52.00	▲29.39
BN	Goh Kheng Sneah	7,435	48.00	▼29.39
Total valid votes		15,481	100.00	
Total rejected ballots		285		
Unreturned ballots		448		
Turnout		16,214	75.47	▲3.28
Registered electors		21,483		
Majority		611	3.95	▼50.82
PKR gain from BN		Swing		?

Penang state election, 2004
Party	Candidate	Votes	%	∆%
BN	Goh Kheng Sneah	10,504	77.38	▲12.62
PKR	Ong Ping Cheow	3,070	22.62	▲22.62
Total valid votes		13,574	100.00	
Total rejected ballots		253		
Unreturned ballots		1		
Turnout		13,828	72.19	▼1.55
Registered electors		19,155		
Majority		7,434	54.77	▲25.23
BN hold		Swing		

Penang state election, 1999
Party	Candidate	Votes	%	∆%
BN	Kee Phaik Cheen	13,311	64.77	▼7.90
PKR	Salma Ismail	7,241	35.23	▲35.23
Total valid votes		20,552	100.00	
Total rejected ballots		345		
Unreturned ballots		168		
Turnout		21,065	73.74	▲1.00
Registered electors		28,567		
Majority		6,070	29.53	▼16.79
BN hold		Swing		

Penang state election, 1995
Party	Candidate	Votes	%	∆%
BN	Kee Phaik Cheen	13,923	72.66	▲12.45
DAP	Rosli Hanafi	5,047	26.34	▼13.45
PBS	Lakhbir Singh Sadu Singh	191	1.00	▲1.00
Total valid votes		19,161	100.00	
Total rejected ballots		301		
Unreturned ballots		55		
Turnout		19,517	72.74	▼0.33
Registered electors		26,832		
Majority		8,876	46.32	▲25.90
BN hold		Swing		

Penang state election, 1990
Party	Candidate	Votes	%	∆%
BN	Kee Phaik Cheen	12,204	60.21	▲9.86
DAP	Ahmad Nor	8,065	39.79	▲7.62
Total valid votes		20,269	100.00	
Total rejected ballots		398		
Unreturned ballots		174		
Turnout		20,841	73.07	▲5.65
Registered electors		28,523		
Majority		4,139	20.42	▲2.24
BN hold		Swing		

Penang state election, 1986
Party	Candidate	Votes	%
BN	Kee Phaik Cheen	7,351	50.35
DAP	Tanasekharan Autherapady	4,697	32.17
PMIP	Said bin Bakar	2,553	17.49
Total valid votes		14,601	100.00
Total rejected ballots		318	
Unreturned ballots		0	
Turnout		14,919	67.42
Registered electors		22,130	
Majority		2,654	18.18
This was a new constituency created.

== See also ==
- Constituencies of Penang
