= Kebun Bunga =

State constituency in Penang, Malaysia

Kebun Bunga (N24)
Penang constituency
- Kebun Bunga (olive) on Penang

State constituency
- Legislature: Penang State Legislative Assembly
MLA
Lee Boon Heng
PH
- Constituency created: 1986
- First contested: 1986
- Last contested: 2023

Demographics
- Electors (2023): 24,532
- Area (km²): 11

Kebun Bunga is a state constituency in Penang, Malaysia, that has been represented in the Penang State Legislative Assembly since 1986. It covers the Penang Botanic Gardens, after which it is named, as well as parts of George Town's western suburbs - Tanjung Tokong and Air Itam.

The state constituency was first contested in 1986 and is mandated to return a single Assemblyman to the Penang State Legislative Assembly under the first-past-the-post voting system.

Lee Boon Heng from People's Justice Party (Malaysia) currently serves as the state assemblyman for Kebun Bunga.

== Definition ==
=== Polling districts ===
According to the federal gazette issued on 30 March 2018, the Kebun Bunga constituency is divided into 8 polling districts.

State constituency	Polling districts	Code	Location
Kebun Bunga (N24)	Fettes Park	048/24/01	SM Phor Tay (Persendirian)
Kebun Bunga (N24)	Ladang Hong Seng	048/24/02	SM Phor Tay (Persendirian)
Kebun Bunga (N24)	Taman Bunga	048/24/03	SJK (C) Phor Tay
Kebun Bunga (N24)	Quarry Drive	048/24/04	SMK Padang Polo
Kebun Bunga (N24)	Jalan Batu Gantong	048/24/05	SK St. Xavier
Kebun Bunga (N24)	Rifle Range Blok A B C	048/24/06	SK Padang Tembak
Kebun Bunga (N24)	Rifle Range Road	048/24/07	SK Padang Tembak
Kebun Bunga (N24)	Rifle Range Blok D E F	048/24/08	SK Padang Tembak

Fettes Park and Ladang Hong Seng are situated at Tanjung Tokong, while Rumah Pangsa, Rifle Range Road and Rifle Range refer to the suburban neighbourhood of Rifle Range at the northern fringes of Air Itam. The western portion of Tanjung Tokong that falls under this constituency, including the neighbourhood of Mount Erskine, is bounded to the east by Jalan Gajah, Tanjung Tokong Road, Fettes Road and Mount Erskine Road.

== Demographics ==
Ethnic breakdown of Kebun Bunga's electorate as of 2023
1. Chinese (75.0%)
2. Indian (16.9%)
3. Malay (7.17%)
4. Other ethnicities (0.93%)

Total electors by polling district in 2016
Polling district	Electors
Fettes Park	3,461
Jalan Batu Gantong	2,824
Ladang Hong Seng	3,005
Quarry Drive	889
Rifle Range	2,693
Rifle Range Road	3,054
Rumah Pangsa	2,888
Taman Bunga	2,250
Total	21,064
Source: Malaysian Election Commission

== History ==
Penang State Legislative Assemblyman for Kebun Bunga
Assembly	No	Years	Member	Party
Constituency created from Tanjong Bungah, Air Itam and Datok Keramat
7th	N21	1986 – 1990	Peter Huang (黃必得)	DAP
8th	N21	1990 – 1995	Teng Hock Nan (丁福南)	BN (GERAKAN)
9th	N21	1995 – 1999	Teng Hock Nan (丁福南)	BN (GERAKAN)
10th	N21	1999 – 2004	Teng Hock Nan (丁福南)	BN (GERAKAN)
11th	N24	2004 – 2008	Quah Kooi Heong (柯为雄)	BN (GERAKAN)
12th	N24	2008 – 2013	Jason Ong Khan Lee (王康力)	PR (PKR)
13th	N24	2013 – 2015	Cheah Kah Peng (谢嘉平)	PR (PKR)
13th	N24	2015 – 2018	Cheah Kah Peng (谢嘉平)	PH (PKR)
14th	N24	2018 – 2023	Jason Ong Khan Lee (王康力)	PH (PKR)
15th	N24	2023–present	Lee Boon Heng (李文興)	PH (PKR)

== Election results ==
The electoral results for the Kebun Bunga state constituency are as follows.

Penang state election, 2023: Kebun Bunga
Party	Candidate	Votes	%	∆%
PH	Lee Boon Heng	14,159	87.80	▲1.50
PN	Tan Zhen Zune	1,204	7.50	▲7.50
Independent	Razalif Mohamad Zain	757	4.70	▲4.70
Total valid votes		16,120	100.00	
Total rejected ballots		131		
Unreturned ballots		22		
Turnout		16,273	66.33	▼15.17
Registered electors		24,532		
Majority		12,955	80.30	▲7.10
PH hold		Swing		

Penang state election, 2018: Kebun Bunga
Party	Candidate	Votes	%	∆%
PKR	Ong Khan Lee	14,851	86.30	▲9.70
BN	Ooi Zhi Yi	2,254	13.10	▼7.60
BERSAMA	Wu Kai Min	110	0.60	▲0.60
Total valid votes		17,215	100.00	
Total rejected ballots		165		
Unreturned ballots		42		
Turnout		17,422	81.50	▼2.30
Registered electors		21,369		
Majority		12,597	73.20	▲17.30
PKR hold		Swing		
Source(s) "His Majesty's Government Gazette - Notice of Contested Election, State Legislative Assembly for the State of Penang [P.U. (B) 252/2018]" (PDF). Attorney General's Chambers of Malaysia. 3 May 2018. "Federal Government Gazette - Results of Contested Election and Statements of the Poll after the Official Addition of Votes, State Constituencies for the State of Penang [P.U. (B) 326/2018]" (PDF). Attorney General's Chambers of Malaysia. 28 May 2018. Archived from the original (PDF) on 2019-08-29.

Penang state election, 2013: Kebun Bunga
Party	Candidate	Votes	%	∆%
PKR	Cheah Kah Peng	12,366	76.60	▲15.00
BN	Hng Chee Wey	3,336	20.70	▼17.70
Independent	Jayaraman s/o K. Kunchu Kannu	159	1.00	▲1.00
Total valid votes		15,861	100.00	
Total rejected ballots		274		
Unreturned ballots		45		
Turnout		16,180	83.80	▲9.50
Registered electors		19,278		
Majority		9,030	55.90	▲32.70
PKR hold		Swing		
Source(s) "Federal Government Gazette - Notice of Contested Election, State Legislative Assembly for the State of Penang [P.U. (B) 189/2013]" (PDF). Attorney General's Chambers of Malaysia. 26 April 2013. "Federal Government Gazette - Results of Contested Election and Statements of the Poll after the Official Addition of Votes, State Constituencies for the State of Penang [P.U. (B) 230/2013]" (PDF). Attorney General's Chambers of Malaysia. 22 May 2013. Archived from the original (PDF) on 2019-03-22.

Penang state election, 2008: Kebun Bunga
Party	Candidate	Votes	%	∆%
PKR	Ong Khan Lee	8,307	61.60	▲61.60
BN	Quah Kooi Heong	5,182	38.40	▼22.43
Total valid votes		13,489	100.00	
Total rejected ballots		231		
Unreturned ballots		1		
Turnout		13,721	74.30	▲2.09
Registered electors		18,458		
Majority		3,125	23.20	▲1.54
PKR gain from BN		Swing		?

Penang state election, 2004: Kebun Bunga
Party	Candidate	Votes	%	∆%
BN	Quah Kooi Heong	8,285	60.83	▼0.89
DAP	Lau Keng Ee	5,087	39.17	▲0.89
Total valid votes		13,372	100.00	
Total rejected ballots		240		
Unreturned ballots		0		
Turnout		13,612	72.21	▲3.54
Registered electors		18,863		
Majority		3,198	21.66	▼2.95
BN hold		Swing		

Penang state election, 1999: Kebun Bunga
Party	Candidate	Votes	%	∆%
BN	Teng Hock Nan	8,551	61.72	▼6.95
DAP	Lim Kit Siang	5,142	37.11	▲6.95
Total valid votes		13,693	100.00	
Total rejected ballots		340		
Unreturned ballots		162		
Turnout		14,195	68.67	▼3.71
Registered electors		20,672		
Majority		3,409	24.61	▼12.73
BN hold		Swing		

Penang state election, 1995: Kebun Bunga
Party	Candidate	Votes	%	∆%
BN	Teng Hock Nan	10,089	68.67	▲18.30
DAP	Gooi Hock Seng	4,603	31.33	▼18.30
Total valid votes		14,692	100.00	
Total rejected ballots		309		
Unreturned ballots		48		
Turnout		15,049	72.38}	▼31.05
Registered electors		20,792		
Majority		5,486	37.34	▲36.60
BN hold		Swing		

Penang state election, 1990: Kebun Bunga
Party	Candidate	Votes	%	∆%
BN	Teng Hock Nan	5,927	50.37	▲1.48
DAP	Gooi Hock Seng	5,843	49.63	▲0.22
Total valid votes		11,770	100.00	
Total rejected ballots		240		
Unreturned ballots		46		
Turnout		12,056	73.43	▲3.90
Registered electors		16,418		
Majority		84	0.74	▲0.19
BN gain from DAP		Swing		.

Penang state election, 1986: Kebun Bunga
Party	Candidate	Votes	%
DAP	Peter Huang	5,227	49.41
BN	Teng Hock Nan	5,172	48.89
SDP	Ng Teng Kok	179	1.70
Total valid votes		10,578	100.00
Total rejected ballots		224	
Unreturned ballots		0	
Turnout		10,802	69.53
Registered electors		15,535	
Majority		55	0.52
This was a new constituency created.

== See also ==
- Constituencies of Penang
