= Lim Siew Khim =

Malaysian politician

Yang Berhormat Puan Lim Siew Khim MLA
- 林秀琴

Member of the Penang State Executive Council
- Incumbent
- Assumed office 16 August 2023
- Governor: Ahmad Fuzi Abdul Razak (2023–2025); Ramli Ngah Talib (since 2025)
- Chief Minister: Chow Kon Yeow
- Portfolio: Social Development, Welfare and Non-Islamic Affairs
- Preceded by: Chong Eng (Social Development & Non-Islamic Affairs); Phee Boon Poh (Welfare)
- Constituency: Sungai Pinang

Member of the Penang State Legislative Assembly for Sungai Pinang
- Incumbent
- Assumed office 5 May 2013
- Preceded by: Koid Teng Guan (PR–DAP)
- Majority: 4,707 (2013); 10,388 (2018); 8,288 (2023)

Personal details
- Born: Lim Siew Khim; 3 November 1970 (age 55) Penang, Malaysia
- Citizenship: Malaysian
- Party: Democratic Action Party (DAP)
- Other political affiliations: Pakatan Rakyat (PR) (2008–2015); Pakatan Harapan (PH) (since 2015)
- Occupation: Politician

Lim Siew Khim

Chinese name
- Traditional Chinese: 林秀琴
- Simplified Chinese: 林秀琴
- Hanyu Pinyin: Lín Xiùqín
- Jyutping: Lam4 Sau3 Kam4
- Hokkien POJ: Lîm Siù-khîm

Lim Siew Khim (Chinese: 林秀琴; Pe̍h-ōe-jī: Lîm Siù-khîm; pinyin: Lín Xiùqín; Jyutping: Lam4 Sau3 Kam4; born 3 November 1970) is a Malaysian politician who has served as Member of the Penang State Executive Council (EXCO) in the Pakatan Harapan (PH) state administration under Chief Minister Chow Kon Yeow since August 2023 and Member of the Penang State Legislative Assembly (MLA) for Sungai Pinang since May 2013. She is a member of the Democratic Action Party (DAP), a component party of the PH and formerly the Pakatan Rakyat (PR) coalitions. She is the State Women Chief of PH and DAP of Penang.

== Election results ==
Penang State Legislative Assembly
Year	Constituency	Candidate	Votes	Pct	Opponent(s)	Votes	Pct	Ballots cast	Majority	Turnout
2013	N30 Sungai Pinang	Lim Siew Khim (DAP)	12,354	60.70%	Thor Teong Gee (Gerakan)	7,647	37.58%	20,351	4,707	86.60%
2013	N30 Sungai Pinang	Lim Siew Khim (DAP)	12,354	60.70%	Mohamed Yacoob (IND)	141	0.69%	20,351	4,707	86.60%
2018	N30 Sungai Pinang	Lim Siew Khim (DAP)	15,362	67.66%	Ng Fook On (Gerakan)	4,974	21.91%	22,704	10,388	84.35%
2018	N30 Sungai Pinang	Lim Siew Khim (DAP)	15,362	67.66%	Yacoob Omar (PAS)	1,575	6.94%	22,704	10,388	84.35%
2018	N30 Sungai Pinang	Lim Siew Khim (DAP)	15,362	67.66%	Teh Yee Cheu (PSM)	223	0.98%	22,704	10,388	84.35%
2018	N30 Sungai Pinang	Lim Siew Khim (DAP)	15,362	67.66%	Mohamed Yacoob (IND)	119	0.52%	22,704	10,388	84.35%
2018	N30 Sungai Pinang	Lim Siew Khim (DAP)	15,362	67.66%	Tan Sim Bee (MUP)	79	0.35%	22,704	10,388	84.35%
2023	N30 Sungai Pinang	Lim Siew Khim (DAP)	16,026	65.13%	Ng Fook On (Gerakan)	7,738	31.45%	24,608	8,288	71.50%
2023	N30 Sungai Pinang	Lim Siew Khim (DAP)	16,026	65.13%	Abdul Ghani Haroon (PRM)	623	2.53%	24,608	8,288	71.50%
2023	N30 Sungai Pinang	Lim Siew Khim (DAP)	16,026	65.13%	Andrew Rajah (IND)	221	0.90%	24,608	8,288	71.50%
