= Pulau Tikus (state constituency) =

State constituency in Penang, Malaysia

Pulau Tikus (N25)
Penang constituency
- Pulau Tikus (olive) on Penang

State constituency
- Legislature: Penang State Legislative Assembly
MLA
Joshua Woo Sze Zeng
PH
- Constituency created: 2004
- First contested: 2004
- Last contested: 2023

Demographics
- Electors (2023): 23,257
- Area (km²): 6

Pulau Tikus is a state constituency in Penang, Malaysia, that has been represented in the Penang State Legislative Assembly since 2004. It covers two of George Town's affluent suburbs - Pulau Tikus and parts of Tanjung Tokong - as well as Gurney Drive.

The state constituency was first contested in 2004 and is mandated to return a single Assemblyman to the Penang State Legislative Assembly under the first-past-the-post voting system. Since August 2023, the State Assemblyman for Pulau Tikus is Joshua Woo Sze Zeng from the Democratic Action Party (DAP), which is part of the state's ruling coalition, Pakatan Harapan (PH).

== Definition ==
=== Polling districts ===
According to the federal gazette issued on 18 July 2023, the Pulau Tikus constituency is divided into 8 polling districts.

State constituency	Polling districts	Code	Location
Pulau Tikus (N25)	Pantai Molek	048/25/01	SJK (C) Perempuan China
Pulau Tikus (N25)	Jalan Punchak Erskine	048/25/02	SMJK Perempuan China
Pulau Tikus (N25)	Taman Gottlieb	044/25/03	SMJK Perempuan China
Pulau Tikus (N25)	College Avenue	044/25/04	SK St Xavier Cawangan
Pulau Tikus (N25)	Bangkok Line	044/25/05	SMK Westlands
Pulau Tikus (N25)	Peel Avenue	044/25/06	Pusat Kecermelangan Sukan Westlands
Pulau Tikus (N25)	Taman Berjaya	048/25/07	SK St. Xavier Cawangan
Pulau Tikus (N25)	Barrack Road	048/25/08	SK Jalan Residensi

The constituency encompasses the Pulau Tikus suburb in its entirety and the southern part of Tanjung Tokong up to Fettes Road (Malay: Jalan Fettes). In addition, the whole stretch of Gurney Drive, the most famous seafront promenade in George Town, falls under this constituency. The constituency consist of a sizable Peranakan and siamese electorate along kelawai and cantonment road.

== Demographics ==
Ethnic breakdown of Pulau Tikus's electorate as of 2023
1. Chinese (75.2%)
2. Malay (13.7%)
3. Indian (8.60%)
4. Other ethnicities (2.46%)

Total electors by polling district in 2016
Polling district	Electors
Ayer Rajah	2,312
Bangkok Lane	2,833
Barrack Road	2,006
College Avenue	2,790
Jalan Punchak Erskine	2,729
Pantai Molek	1,992
Peel Avenue	2,364
Taman Gottlieb	799
Total	17,825
Source: Malaysian Election Commission

== History ==
Penang State Legislative Assemblyman for Pulau Tikus
Assembly	No	Years	Member	Party
Constituency created from Kebun Bunga and Tanjong Bunga
11th	N25	2004 – 2008	Teng Hock Nan (丁福南)	BN (GERAKAN)
12th	N25	2008 – 2013	Koay Teng Hai (郭庭恺)	PR (DAP)
13th	N25	2013 – 2018	Yap Soo Huey (叶舒惠)	PR (DAP)
14th	N25	2018 – 2023	Chris Lee Chun Kit (李俊杰)	PH (DAP)
15th	N25	2023–present	Joshua Woo Sze Zeng (胡智胜)	PH (DAP)

== Election results ==
The electoral results for the Pulau Tikus state constituency are as follows.

Penang state election, 2023
Party	Candidate	Votes	%	∆%
PH	Joshua Woo Sze Zeng	11,577	85.10	▲2.80
PN	Tang Ching Sern	1,808	13.30	▲13.30
Parti Rakyat Malaysia	Goh Chuin Loon	220	1.60	▲1.60
Total valid votes		13,605	100.00	
Total rejected ballots		81		
Unreturned ballots		33		
Turnout		13,719	58.99	▼19.01
Registered electors		23,257		
Majority		9,769	71.80	▲6.70
PH hold		Swing		

Penang state election, 2018
Party	Candidate	Votes	%	∆%
PKR	Chris Lee Chun Kit	11,679	82.30	▲82.30
BN	Loo Jieh Sheng	2,434	17.20	▼3.90
BERSAMA	Wee Kean Wai	75	0.50	▲0.50
Total valid votes		14,188	100.00	
Total rejected ballots		138		
Unreturned ballots		53		
Turnout		14,379	78.00	▼2.50
Registered electors		18,423		
Majority		9,245	65.10	▲8.10
PKR hold		Swing		
Source(s) "His Majesty's Government Gazette - Notice of Contested Election, State Legislative Assembly for the State of Penang [P.U. (B) 252/2018]" (PDF). Attorney General's Chambers of Malaysia. 3 May 2018. "Federal Government Gazette - Results of Contested Election and Statements of the Poll after the Official Addition of Votes, State Constituencies for the State of Penang [P.U. (B) 326/2018]" (PDF). Attorney General's Chambers of Malaysia. 28 May 2018. Archived from the original (PDF) on 29 August 2019.

Penang state election, 2013
Party	Candidate	Votes	%	∆%
DAP	Yap Soo Huey	11,256	78.10	▲20.70
BN	Rowena Yam	3,036	21.10	▼21.50
Total valid votes		14,292	100.00	
Total rejected ballots		125		
Unreturned ballots		25		
Turnout		14,442	80.50	▲10.10
Registered electors		17,936		
Majority		8,220	57.00	▲42.20
DAP hold		Swing		
Source(s) "Federal Government Gazette - Notice of Contested Election, State Legislative Assembly for the State of Penang [P.U. (B) 189/2013]" (PDF). Attorney General's Chambers of Malaysia. 26 April 2013. "Federal Government Gazette - Results of Contested Election and Statements of the Poll after the Official Addition of Votes, State Constituencies for the State of Penang [P.U. (B) 230/2013]" (PDF). Attorney General's Chambers of Malaysia. 22 May 2013. Archived from the original (PDF) on 22 March 2019.

Penang state election, 2008
Party	Candidate	Votes	%	∆%
DAP	Koay Teng Hai	6,649	57.40	▲33.86
BN	Teng Hock Nan	4,935	42.60	▼33.86
Total valid votes		11,584	100.00	
Total rejected ballots		168		
Unreturned ballots		14		
Turnout		11,766	70.40	▲3.74
Registered electors		16,723		
Majority		1,714	14.80	▲39.12
DAP gain from BN		Swing		.

Penang state election, 2004
Party	Candidate	Votes	%
BN	Teng Hock Nan	8,614	77.46
PKR	Ong Khan Lee	2,507	23.54
Total valid votes		11,121	100.00
Total rejected ballots		283	
Unreturned ballots		21	
Turnout		11,425	66.66
Registered electors		17,139	
Majority		6,107	53.92
This was a new constituency created.

== See also ==
- Constituencies of Penang
